= List of noctuid genera: O =

The huge moth family Noctuidae contains the following genera:

A B C D E F G H I J K L M N O P Q R S T U V W X Y Z

- Obana
- Obarza
- Obdora
- Obesypena
- Obrima
- Obroatis
- Obtuscampa
- Obucola
- Ocalaria
- Ochrocalama
- Ochropleura
- Ochrotrigona
- Odice
- Odontelia
- Odontestra
- Odontodes
- Odontoretha
- Oedebasis
- Oederastria
- Oederemia
- Oediblemma
- Oedibrya
- Oedicodia
- Oediconia
- Oediplexia
- Oenoptera
- Ogdoconta
- Oglasa
- Oglasodes
- Ogoas
- Ogovia
- Oidemastis
- Oligarcha
- Oligia
- Oligonyx
- Olivenebula
- Olulis
- Olulodes
- Olybama
- Olyssa
- Ombrea
- Omia
- Ommatochila
- Ommatophora
- Ommatostola
- Ommatostolidea
- Omoptera
- Omorphina
- Omphalagria
- Omphalestra
- Omphaletis
- Omphaloceps
- Omphalophana
- Omphaloscelis
- Oncocnemis
- Oncotibialis
- Onevatha
- Onychagrotis
- Onychestra
- Oortiana
- Opacographa
- Ophideres
- Ophisma
- Ophiuche
- Ophiusa
- Ophthalmis
- Ophyx
- Opigena
- Oporophylla
- Opotura
- Opsigalea
- Opsyra
- Optocala
- Oraesia
- Orbifrons
- Orbona
- Orectis
- Oria
- Ornitopia
- Oroba
- Orodesma
- Oromena
- Oroplexia
- Orosagrotis
- Oroscopa
- Orotermes
- Orrea
- Orrhodia
- Orrhodiella
- Orsa
- Ortheaga
- Orthia
- Orthoclostera
- Orthodes
- Orthogonia
- Orthogramma
- Orthogrammica
- Ortholeuca
- Orthopha
- Orthoruza
- Orthosia
- Orthozancla
- Orthozona
- Ortopla
- Ortospana
- Oruza
- Oruzodes
- Orygmophora
- Osericana
- Oslaria
- Ossonoba
- Ostacronycta
- Ostha
- Ostheldera
- Osthelderichola
- Osthopis
- Otaces
- Othreis
- Othresypna
- Outaya
- Ovios
- Owadaglaea
- Oxaenanus
- Oxicesta
- Oxidercia
- Oxira
- Oxogona
- Oxycilla
- Oxycnemis
- Oxygonitis
- Oxylos
- Oxyodes
- Oxythaphora
- Oxythres
- Oxytrita
- Oxytrypia
- Ozana
- Ozarba
- Ozopteryx
