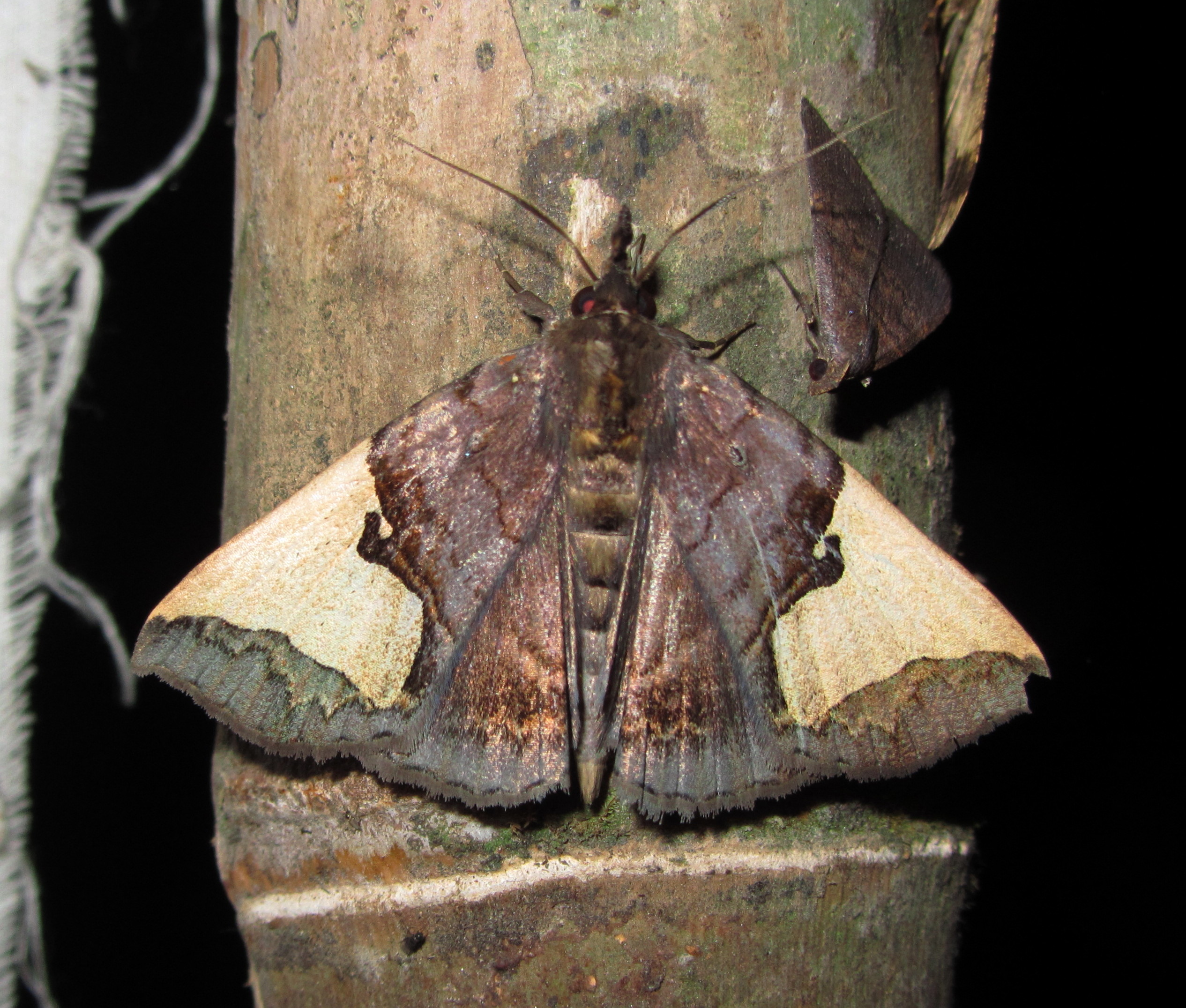

Scientific classification
- Kingdom: Animalia
- Phylum: Arthropoda
- Class: Insecta
- Order: Lepidoptera
- Superfamily: Noctuoidea
- Family: Erebidae
- Genus: Ochrotrigona
- Species: O. triangulifera

Binomial name
- Ochrotrigona triangulifera (Hampson, 1895)

Synonyms
- Bleptina triangulifera Hampson, 1895; Macna praetextata Hering, 1903; Ochrotrigona praetextata; Ochrotrigona quadratifera Prout, 1928

= Ochrotrigona triangulifera =

Species of moth

Ochrotrigona triangulifera is a moth of the family Erebidae first described by George Hampson in 1895. It is found in Sikkim, Thailand, Vietnam, Peninsular Malaysia and on Borneo and Sumatra.
