= Olulis lactigutta =

Scientific classification
- Kingdom: Animalia
- Phylum: Arthropoda
- Clade: Pancrustacea
- Class: Insecta
- Order: Lepidoptera
- Superfamily: Noctuoidea
- Family: Erebidae
- Subfamily: Calpinae
- Genus: Olulis
- Species: O. lactigutta

Binomial name
- Olulis lactigutta Hampson, 1907

Species of moth

Olulis lactigutta is a species in the moth family Erebidae.
