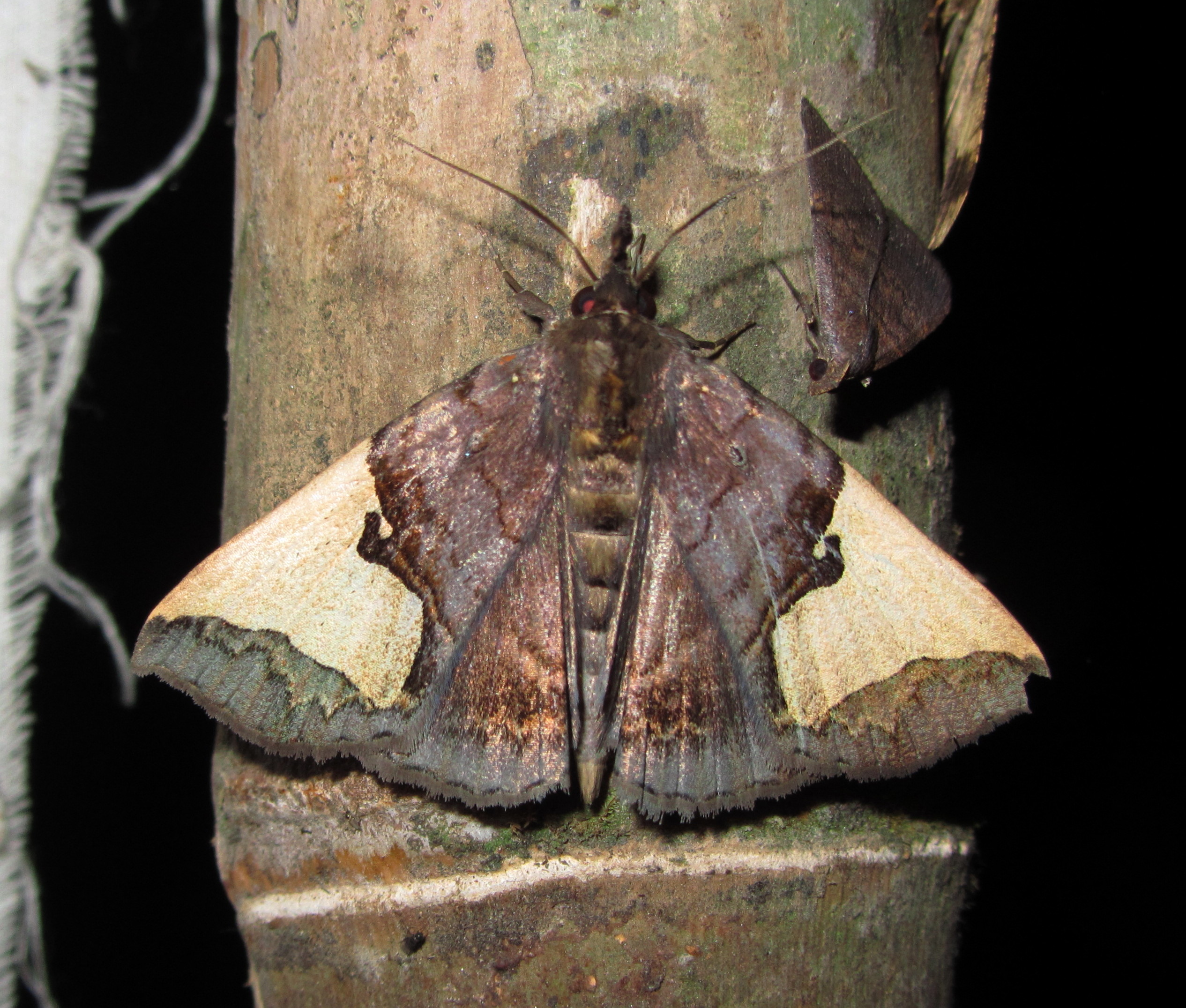
- Ochrotrigona triangulifera

Scientific classification
- Kingdom: Animalia
- Phylum: Arthropoda
- Class: Insecta
- Order: Lepidoptera
- Superfamily: Noctuoidea
- Family: Erebidae
- Subfamily: Calpinae
- Genus: Ochrotrigona; Hampson, 1926

= Ochrotrigona =

Genus of moths

Ochrotrigona is a genus of moths of the family Erebidae. The genus was erected by George Hampson in 1926.

== Species ==
- Ochrotrigona triangulifera (Hampson, 1895) Sikkim, Thailand, Vietnam, Peninsular Malaysia
- Ochrotrigona praetextata (Hering, 1903) Borneo, Sumatra, Peninsular Malaysia
