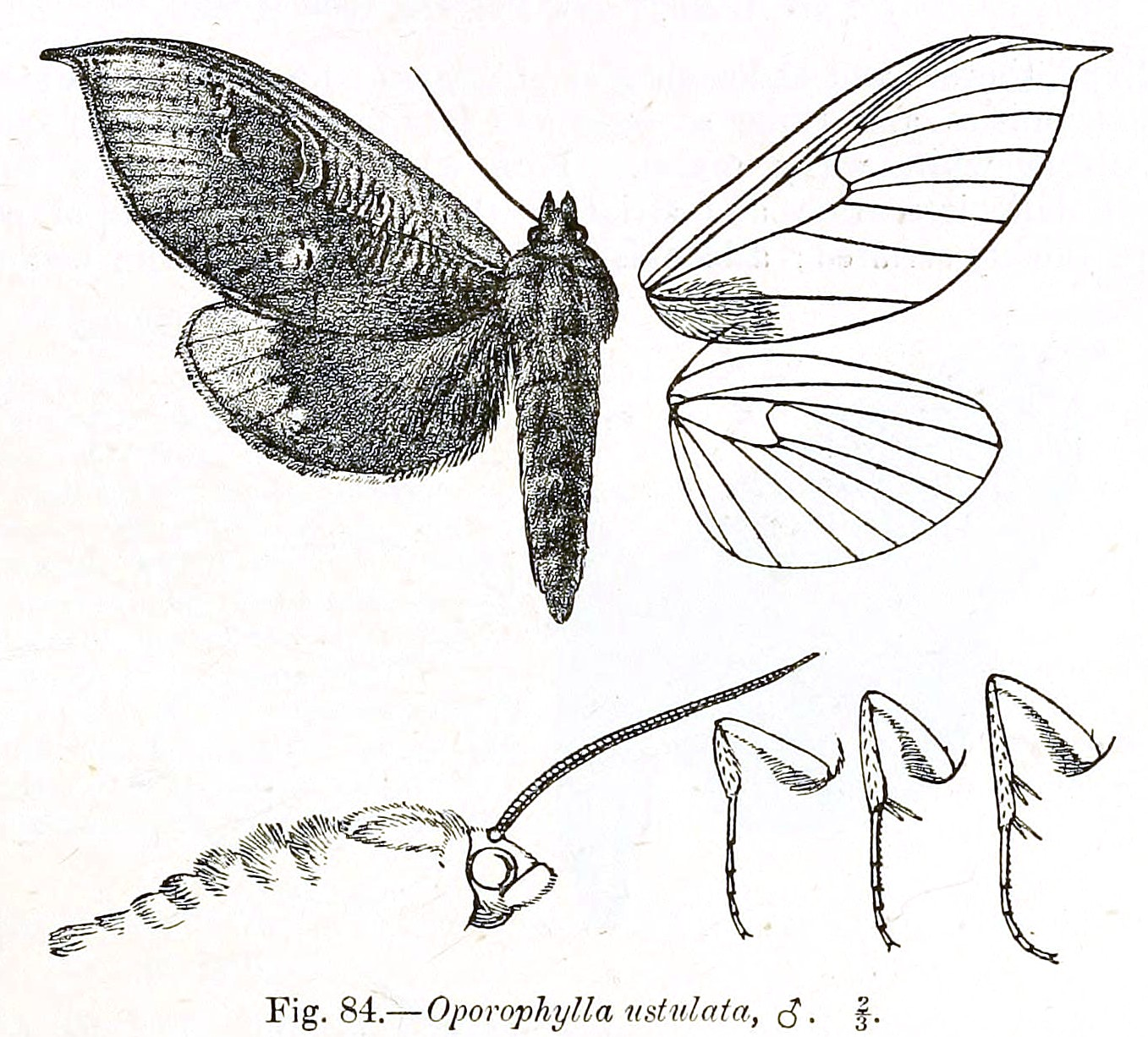

Scientific classification
- Kingdom: Animalia
- Phylum: Arthropoda
- Class: Insecta
- Order: Lepidoptera
- Superfamily: Noctuoidea
- Family: Noctuidae (?)
- Subfamily: Catocalinae
- Genus: Oporophylla; Hampson, 1913
- Species: O. ustulata

Binomial name
- Oporophylla ustulata Westwood, 1848

= Oporophylla =

Genus of moths

Oporophylla is a monotypic moth genus in the family Noctuidae. The genus was erected by George Hampson in 1913. Its only species, Oporophylla ustulata, was first described by Westwood in 1848. It is found in Bangladesh.
