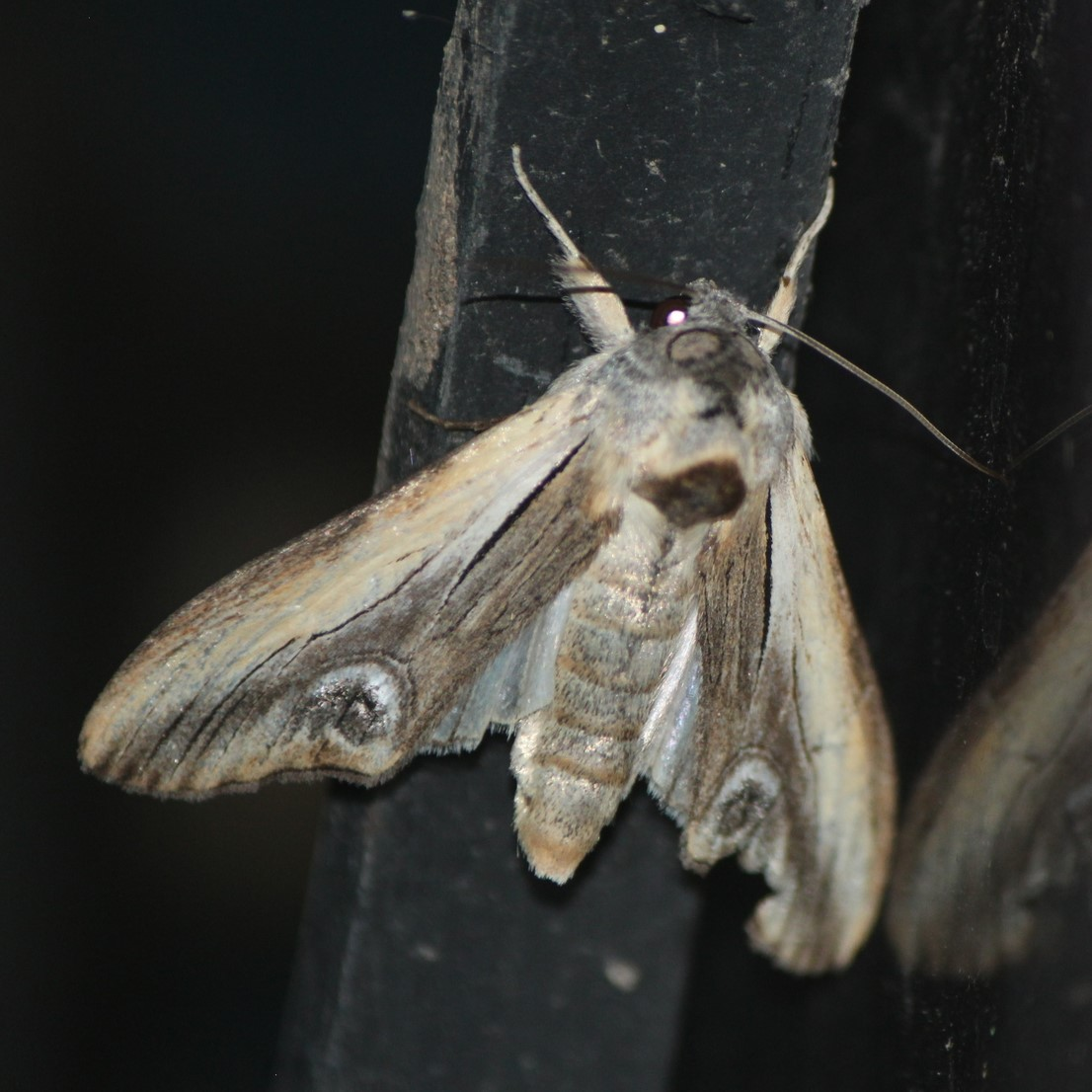
- Opsigalea ocellata

Scientific classification
- Kingdom: Animalia
- Phylum: Arthropoda
- Class: Insecta
- Order: Lepidoptera
- Superfamily: Noctuoidea
- Family: Noctuidae
- Subfamily: Cuculliinae
- Genus: Opsigalea; Hampson, 1906

= Opsigalea =

Genus of moths

Opsigalea is a genus of moths in the family Noctuidae.

== Selected species ==
- Opsigalea blanchardi Todd, 1966
