= Omphaloceps triangularis =

Scientific classification
- Kingdom: Animalia
- Phylum: Arthropoda
- Class: Insecta
- Order: Lepidoptera
- Superfamily: Noctuoidea
- Family: Noctuidae
- Genus: Omphaloceps
- Species: O. triangularis

Binomial name
- Omphaloceps triangularis (Mabille, 1893)

Synonyms
- Eusemia triangularis Mabille, 1893; Phasis astrapeus Holland, 1893; Rothia mariae Swinhoe, 1904

Species of moth

Omphaloceps triangularis is a moth of the family Noctuidae. It is found in Cameroon, the Republic of the Congo, the Democratic Republic of the Congo, Gabon, Ivory Coast and Uganda.
