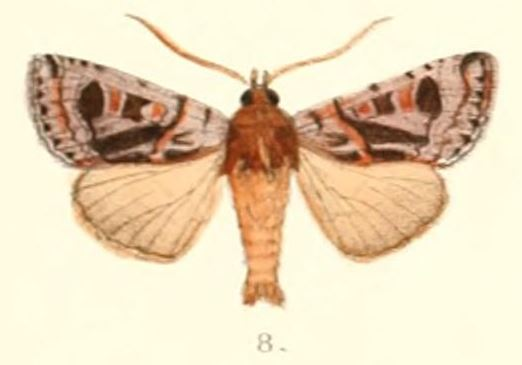
- Oroplexia decorata

Scientific classification
- Kingdom: Animalia
- Phylum: Arthropoda
- Class: Insecta
- Order: Lepidoptera
- Superfamily: Noctuoidea
- Family: Noctuidae
- Genus: Oroplexia; Hampson, 1908

= Oroplexia =

Genus of moths

Oroplexia is a genus of moths of the family Noctuidae.

== Species ==
- Oroplexia albiflexura (Walker, 1857)
- Oroplexia decorata (Moore, 1882)
- Oroplexia luteifrons (Walker, 1857)
- Oroplexia retrahens (Walker, 1857)
- Oroplexia separata (Moore, 1882)
- Oroplexia simulata (Moore, 1881)
- Oroplexia tripartita (Leech, 1900)
