= Oglasodes =

Scientific classification
- Kingdom: Animalia
- Phylum: Arthropoda
- Class: Insecta
- Order: Lepidoptera
- Superfamily: Noctuoidea
- Family: Erebidae
- Subfamily: Calpinae
- Genus: Oglasodes; Hampson, 1926

Genus of moths

Oglasodes is a genus of moths of the family Erebidae. The genus was erected by George Hampson in 1926.

== Species ==
- Oglasodes atrisignata Hampson, 1926 Ghana
- Oglasodes bisinuata Hampson, 1926 Ghana
- Oglasodes nyasica Hampson, 1926 Kenya, Malawi
