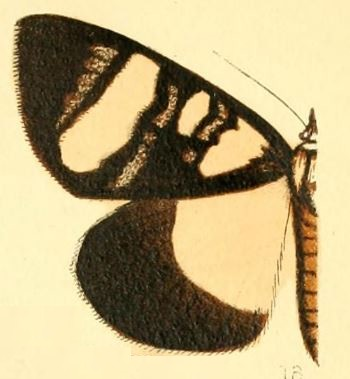
- Omphaloceps daria

Scientific classification
- Kingdom: Animalia
- Phylum: Arthropoda
- Class: Insecta
- Order: Lepidoptera
- Superfamily: Noctuoidea
- Family: Noctuidae
- Subfamily: Agaristinae
- Genus: Omphaloceps; Hampson, 1901

= Omphaloceps =

Genus of moths

Omphaloceps is a genus of moths of the family Noctuidae. The genus was erected by George Hampson in 1901.

== Taxonomy ==
The Global Lepidoptera Names Index gives this name as a synonym of Schausia Karsch, 1895.

== Species ==
- Omphaloceps daria H. Druce, 1895
- Omphaloceps triangularis Mabille, 1893
