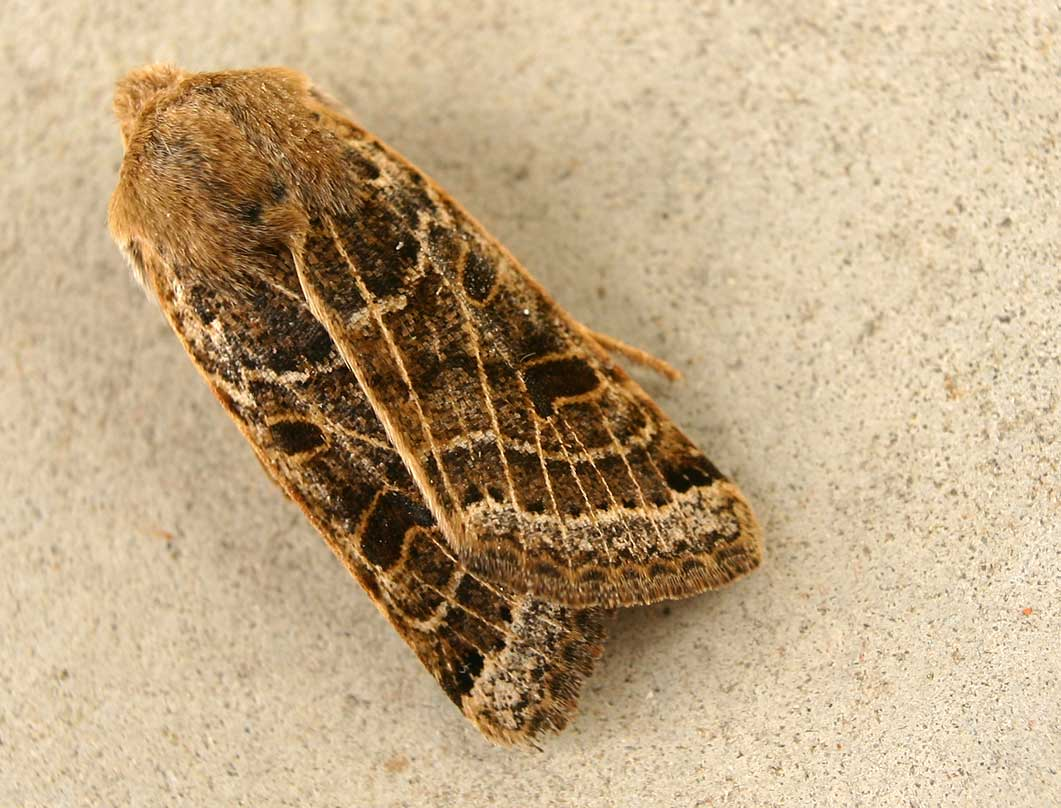
- Omphaloscelis lunosa

Scientific classification
- Kingdom: Animalia
- Phylum: Arthropoda
- Class: Insecta
- Order: Lepidoptera
- Superfamily: Noctuoidea
- Family: Noctuidae
- Subfamily: Cuculliinae
- Genus: Omphaloscelis; Hampson, 1906

= Omphaloscelis =

Genus of moths

Omphaloscelis is a genus of moths of the family Noctuidae.

== Species ==
- Omphaloscelis lunosa (Haworth, 1809)
- Omphaloscelis polybela (de Joannis, 1903)
