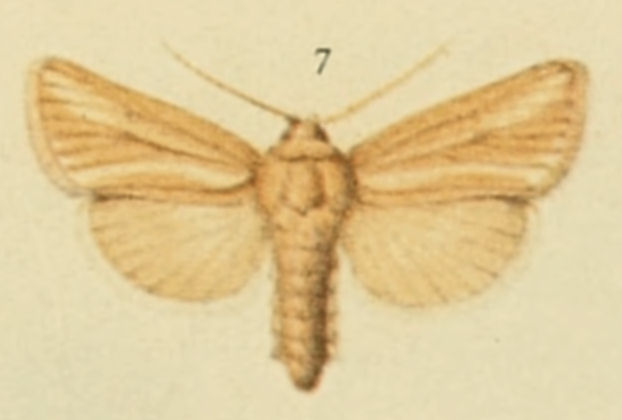

Scientific classification
- Kingdom: Animalia
- Phylum: Arthropoda
- Class: Insecta
- Order: Lepidoptera
- Superfamily: Noctuoidea
- Family: Noctuidae
- Genus: Oria
- Species: O. musculosa

Binomial name
- Oria musculosa (Hübner, 1808)

Synonyms
- Noctua musculosa Hübner, [1808]; ? nervosa Stephens, 1829; Tapinostola frumentalis Lindemann, 1883; ? olivina Alphéraky; ? dirini Alphéraky; Sesamia flavescens Hampson, 1902; Leucania flava Freyer, 1842; Tapinostola musculosa var. laeta Alphéraky, 1889

= Oria musculosa =

Species of moth

The Brighton wainscot (Oria musculosa) is a moth of the family Noctuidae.

It is found in mainland Europe, north Africa and east across the Palearctic to Central Asia, with a separated population in South Africa. It is nationally scarce in Britain where it may be confined to Salisbury Plain, and was pronounced extinct as a resident species by 2013.

== Technical description and variation ==
O. musculosa Hbn. (= nervosa Stph., flava Frr., frumentalis Lindem., flavescens Hmps.) (48 f). Forewing whitish ochreous suffused with yellowish, the pale ground colour showing as streaks along the folds and an oblique streak from apex to end of cell, where the reniform is marked by a pale blotch with a grey spot at its lower end: veins towards termen grey-tinged; hindwing whitish, washed with grey, the veins darker; laeta Alph. is a small, pale, yellowish form from Central Asia. Larva pale greenish, with four dark lines at even distances apart, forming spots on the anal segment; head redbrown; thoracic plate yellow; spiracles black. The wingspan is 28–34 mm.

== Biology ==
The moth flies in July and August.

The larvae feed internally from autumn to spring in the stems of cereal crops. including Rye and also in Calamagrostis epigeios.
