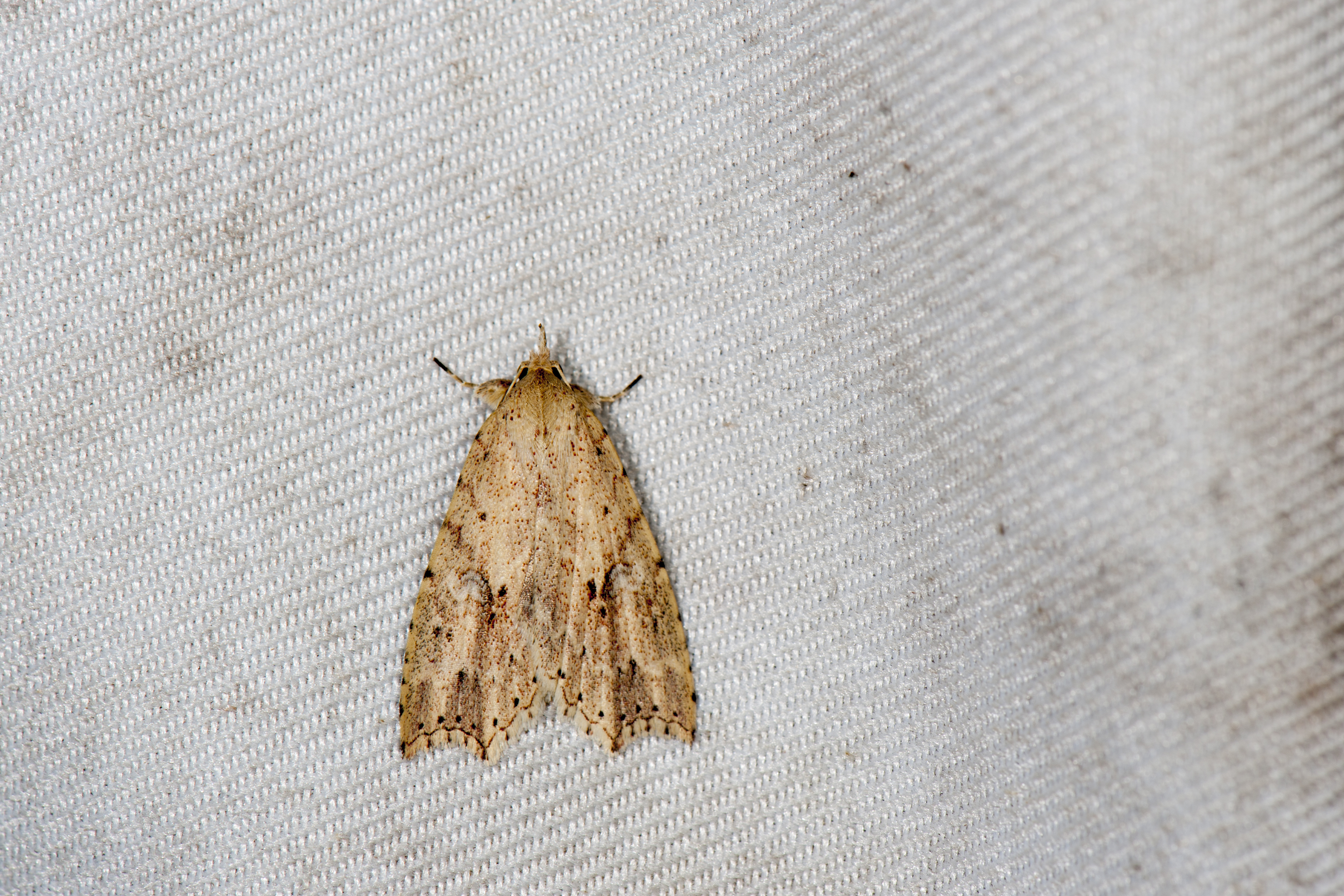

Scientific classification
- Kingdom: Animalia
- Phylum: Arthropoda
- Clade: Pancrustacea
- Class: Insecta
- Order: Lepidoptera
- Superfamily: Noctuoidea
- Family: Erebidae
- Subfamily: Calpinae
- Genus: Olulis
- Species: O. puncticinctalis

Binomial name
- Olulis puncticinctalis Walker, 1863

Synonyms
- Hamaxia lignulina Walker, 1863; Phachthia lignigeralis Walker

= Olulis puncticinctalis =

Species of moth

Olulis puncticinctalis is a moth of the family Erebidae first described by Francis Walker in 1863. It is found in Borneo, Peninsular Malaysia, the Andaman Islands, India, Sri Lanka, Taiwan and Japan.
