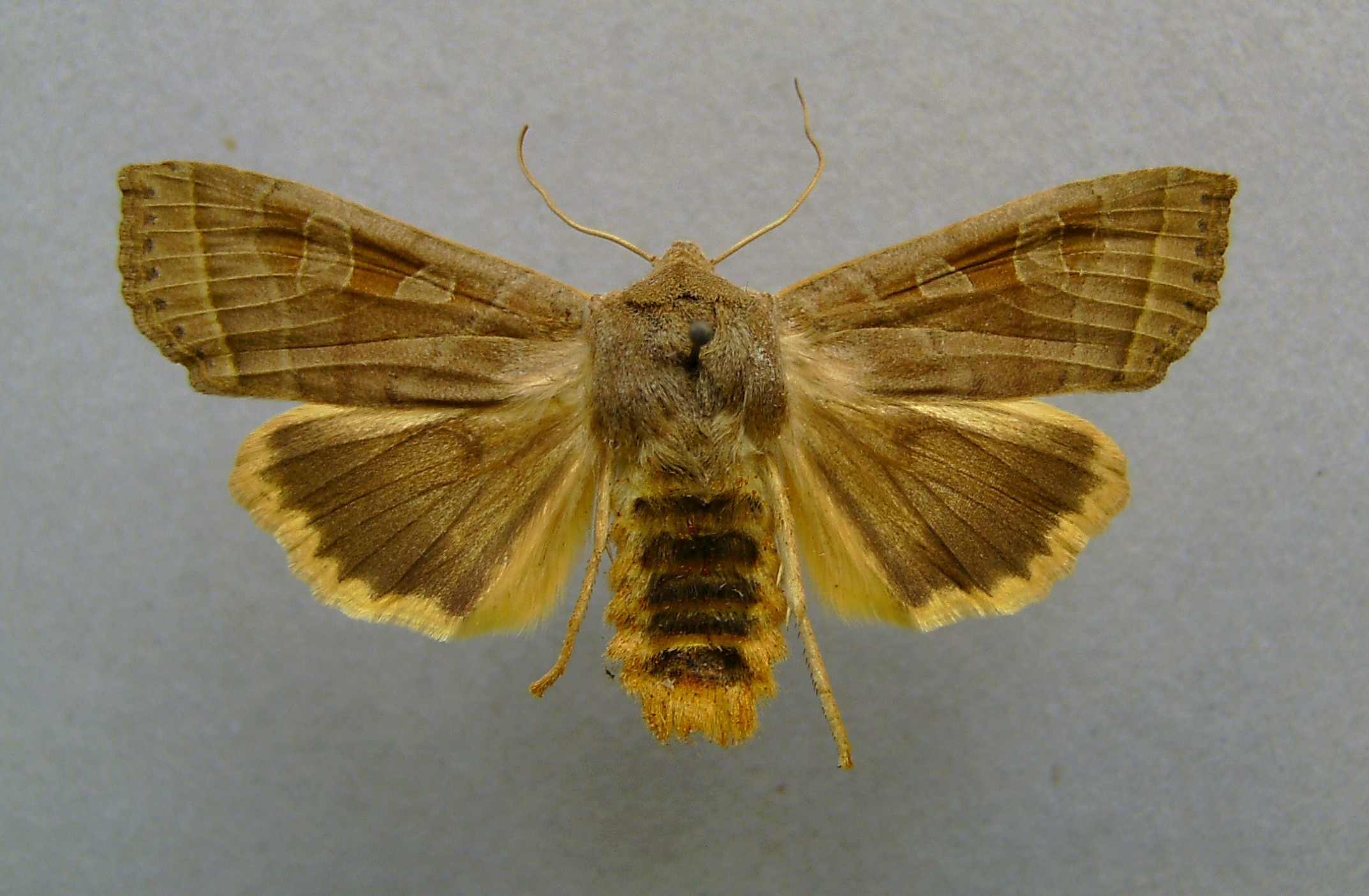

Scientific classification
- Domain: Eukaryota
- Kingdom: Animalia
- Phylum: Arthropoda
- Class: Insecta
- Order: Lepidoptera
- Superfamily: Noctuoidea
- Family: Noctuidae
- Genus: Orbona
- Species: O. fragariae

Binomial name
- Orbona fragariae (Vieweg, 1790)

Synonyms
- Noctua fragariae Vieweg, 1790; Phalaena (Noctua) domiduca Borkhausen, 1792 (preocc.); Phalaena (Bombyx) fragariae Esper, 1794; Cerastis serotina Ochsenheimer, 1816; Orbona fragariae f. pallidior Warren, 1910; Conistra fragariae (Vieweg, 1790); Orrhodia fragariae (Vieweg, 1790)

= Orbona fragariae =

Species of moth

Orbona fragariae is a moth of the family Noctuidae. It is found from central Europe, through Siberia to the Pacific Ocean.

The wingspan is 54–62 mm. Adults are on wing from the end of August to May of the following year after overwintering. They are active during both day and night.

The larvae feed on various plants, including Plantago, Taraxacum, Galium, Clematis, Vicia, Salix and Prunus spinosa.
