= Oediplexia =

Scientific classification
- Kingdom: Animalia
- Phylum: Arthropoda
- Class: Insecta
- Order: Lepidoptera
- Superfamily: Noctuoidea
- Family: Noctuidae
- Subfamily: Amphipyrinae
- Genus: Oediplexia; Hampson, 1908

Genus of moths

Oediplexia is a genus of moths of the family Noctuidae. The genus was erected by George Hampson in 1908.

== Species ==
- Oediplexia citrophila Berio, 1962 (from Aldabra / Seychelles)
- Oediplexia mesophaea Hampson, 1908 (from Tanzania)
