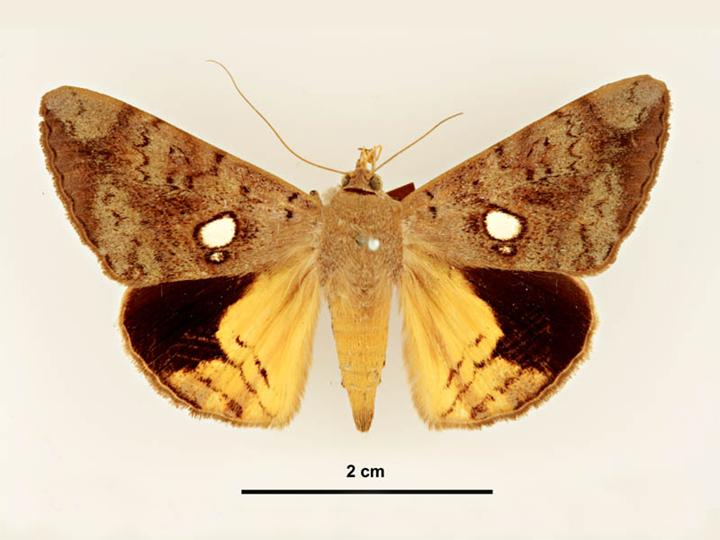
- Female
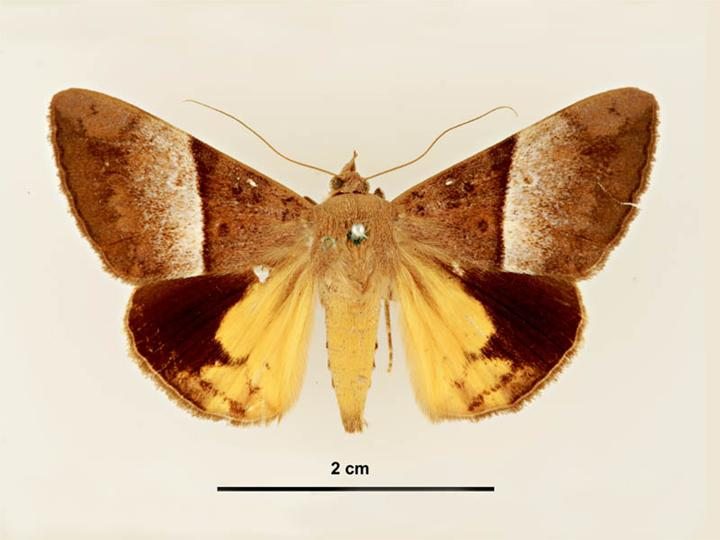
- Male

Scientific classification
- Kingdom: Animalia
- Phylum: Arthropoda
- Class: Insecta
- Order: Lepidoptera
- Superfamily: Noctuoidea
- Family: Erebidae
- Genus: Oxyodes
- Species: O. tricolor

Binomial name
- Oxyodes tricolor Guenee, 1852

= Oxyodes tricolor =

Species of moth

Oxyodes tricolor is a species of moth of the family Noctuidae first described by Achille Guenée in 1852. It is found in Australia along the coast of Queensland.

The wingspan is about 40 mm.

The larvae feed on the young leaves of various trees, including Litchi chinensis, Nephelium lappaceum, Cyphomandra betacea and Theobroma cacao.
