= Orthozona =

Scientific classification
- Kingdom: Animalia
- Phylum: Arthropoda
- Class: Insecta
- Order: Lepidoptera
- Superfamily: Noctuoidea
- Family: Erebidae
- Subfamily: Herminiinae
- Genus: Orthozona; Hampson, 1895

Genus of moths

Orthozona is a genus of moths of the family Erebidae.

== Species ==
- Orthozona bilineata Wileman, 1915
- Orthozona curvilineata Wileman, 1915
- Orthozona karapina Strand, 1920
- Orthozona quadrilineata (Moore, 1882) (from India/Darjeeling)
- Orthozona rufilineata (Hampson, 1895)
