= Oxicesta serratae =

Scientific classification
- Domain: Eukaryota
- Kingdom: Animalia
- Phylum: Arthropoda
- Class: Insecta
- Order: Lepidoptera
- Superfamily: Noctuoidea
- Family: Noctuidae
- Genus: Oxicesta
- Species: O. serratae

Binomial name
- Oxicesta serratae Zerny, 1927

Synonyms
- Oxycestra serratae Zerny, 1927

Species of moth

Oxicesta serratae is a moth in the family Noctuidae. It is found in France and Spain.

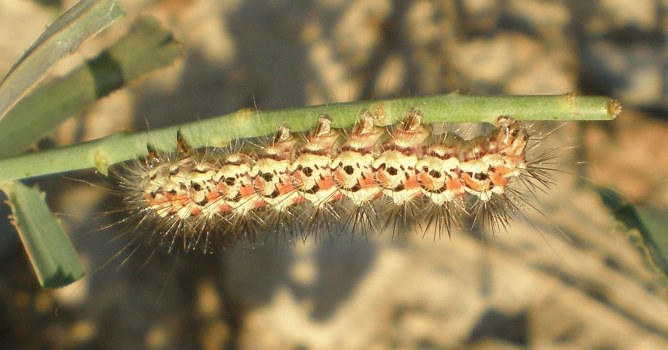
Larva

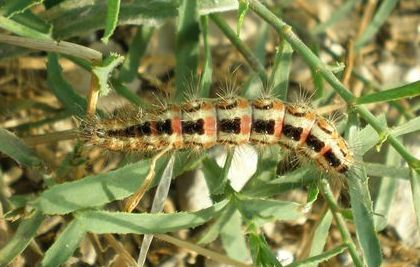
Larva

The larvae feed on Euphorbia serrata.
