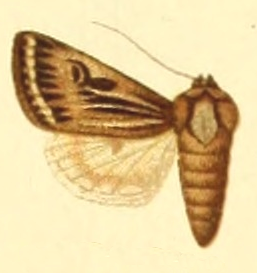

Scientific classification
- Kingdom: Animalia
- Phylum: Arthropoda
- Class: Insecta
- Order: Lepidoptera
- Superfamily: Noctuoidea
- Family: Noctuidae
- Genus: Omphaloscelis
- Species: O. polybela

Binomial name
- Omphaloscelis polybela (de Joannis, 1903)

Synonyms
- Euxoa polybela de Joannis, 1903; Omphaloscelis teukyrana Turati, 1924

= Omphaloscelis polybela =

Species of moth

Omphaloscelis polybela is a moth of the family Noctuidae. It is found in North Africa, from Algeria at least to Libya.

== Subspecies ==
- Omphaloscelis polybela polybela (Algeria)
- Omphaloscelis polybela teukyrana (Libya)
