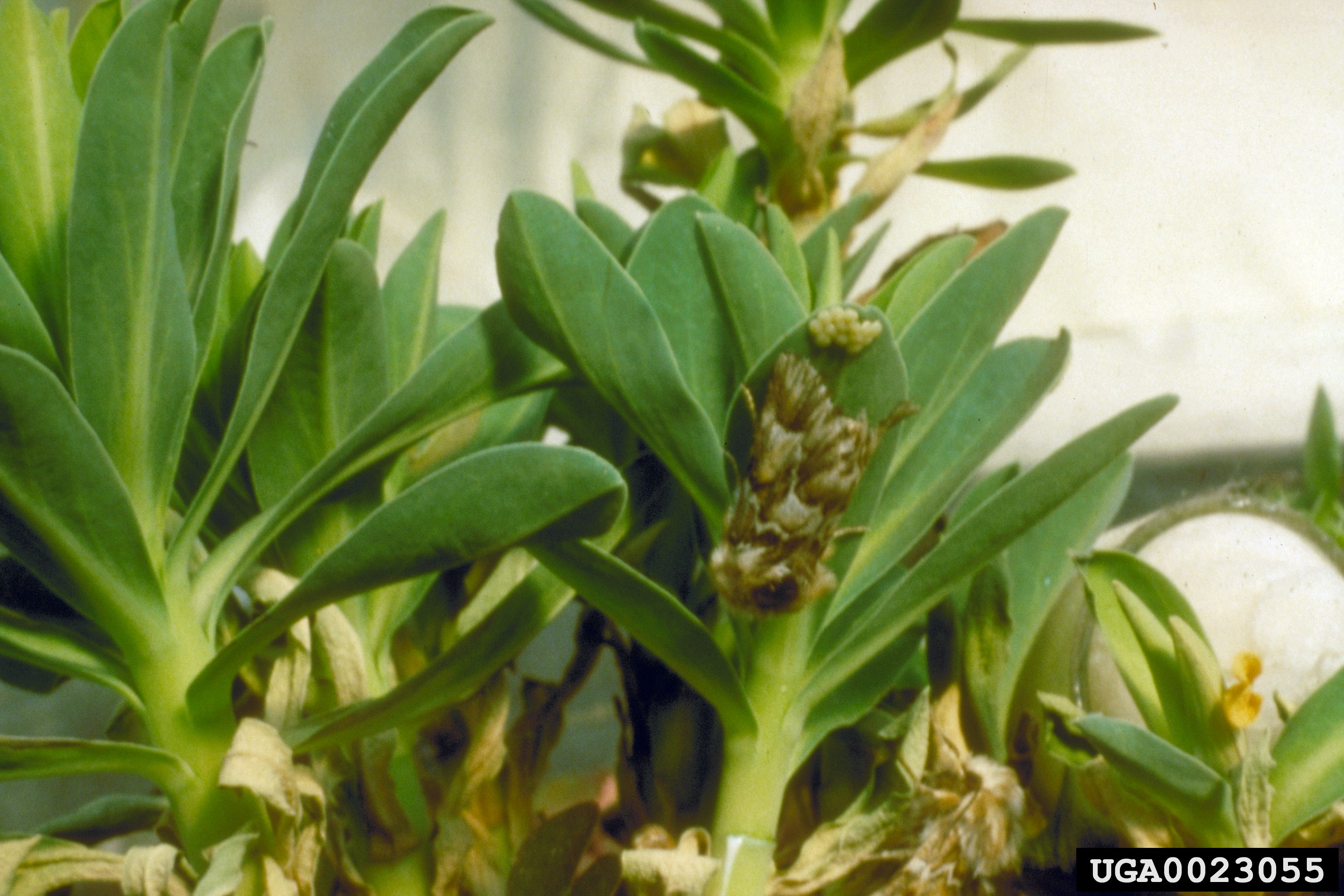

Scientific classification
- Kingdom: Animalia
- Phylum: Arthropoda
- Clade: Pancrustacea
- Class: Insecta
- Order: Lepidoptera
- Superfamily: Noctuoidea
- Family: Noctuidae
- Genus: Oxicesta
- Species: O. geographica

Binomial name
- Oxicesta geographica (Fabricius, 1787)

Synonyms
- Noctua geographica (Fabricius, 1787); Phalaena Bombyx sericina Hübner, 1790; Phalaena Bombyx austera Borkhausen, 1791

= Oxicesta geographica =

Species of moth

Oxicesta geographica is a moth of the family Noctuidae. It is found in southern Romania, Austria, Hungary, from the former Yugoslavia to northern Greece and Turkey. It has also been reported from Russian Moldavia and Georgia.

The wingspan is 24–27 mm.

The larvae feed on Euphorbia species, with a preference for species in the subgenus Esula.

== Gallery ==
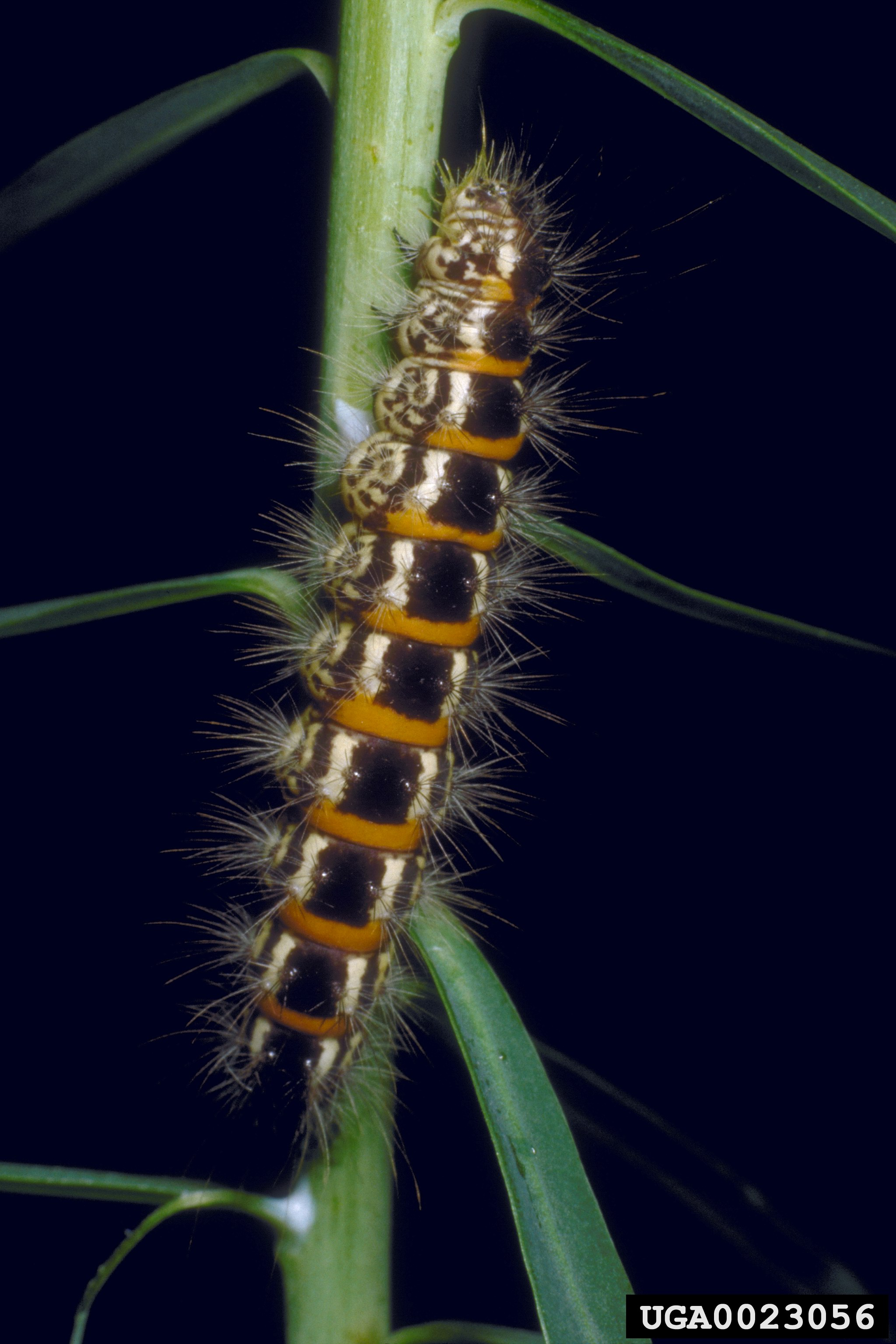
Larva

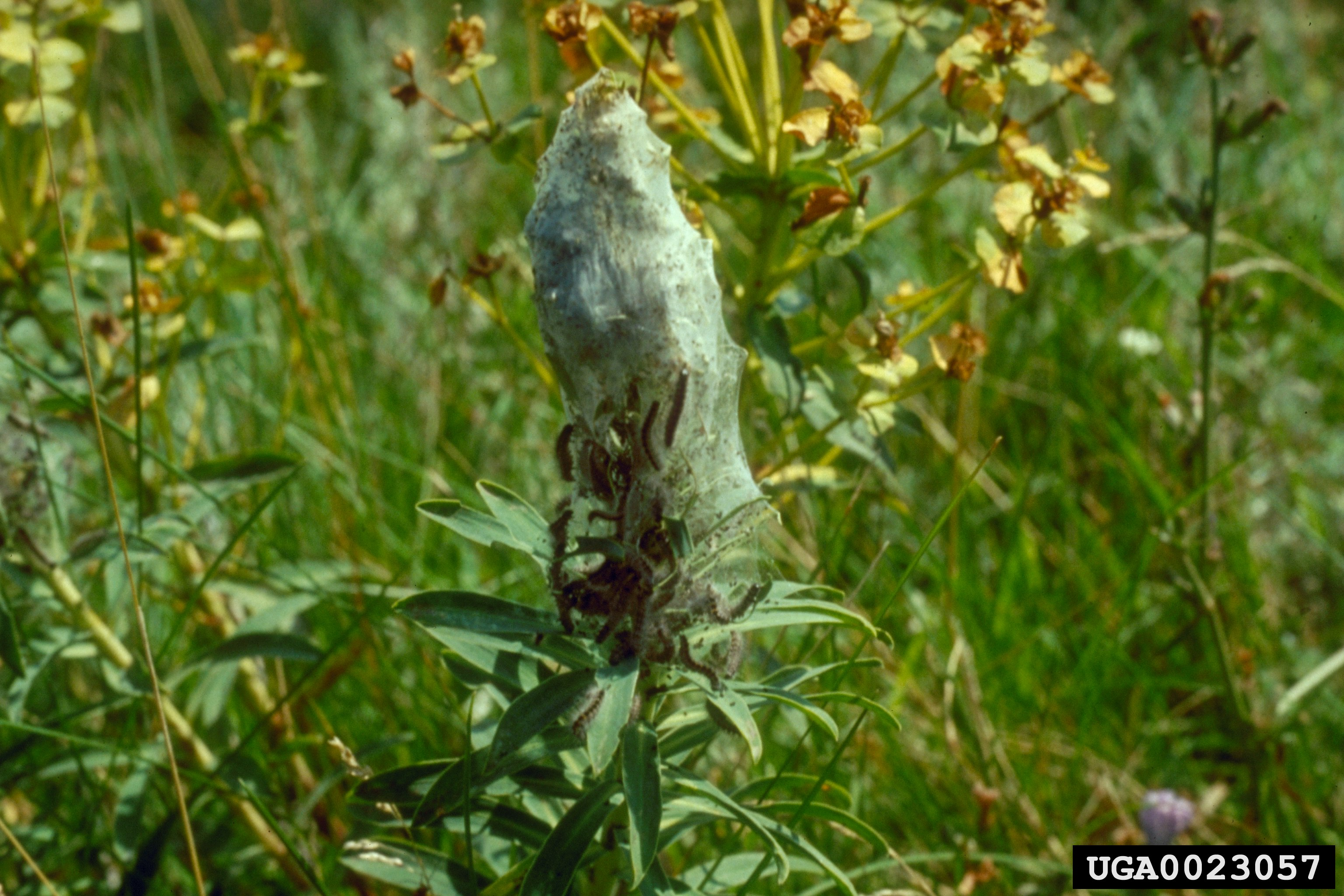
Spinning
