= Omphalagria =

Scientific classification
- Kingdom: Animalia
- Phylum: Arthropoda
- Class: Insecta
- Order: Lepidoptera
- Superfamily: Noctuoidea
- Family: Noctuidae
- Genus: Omphalagria; Hampson, 1910

Genus of moths

Omphalagria is a genus of moths of the family Noctuidae.

== Species ==
- Omphalagria hemiochra Hampson, 1910
- Omphalagria togoensis Gaede, 1915
