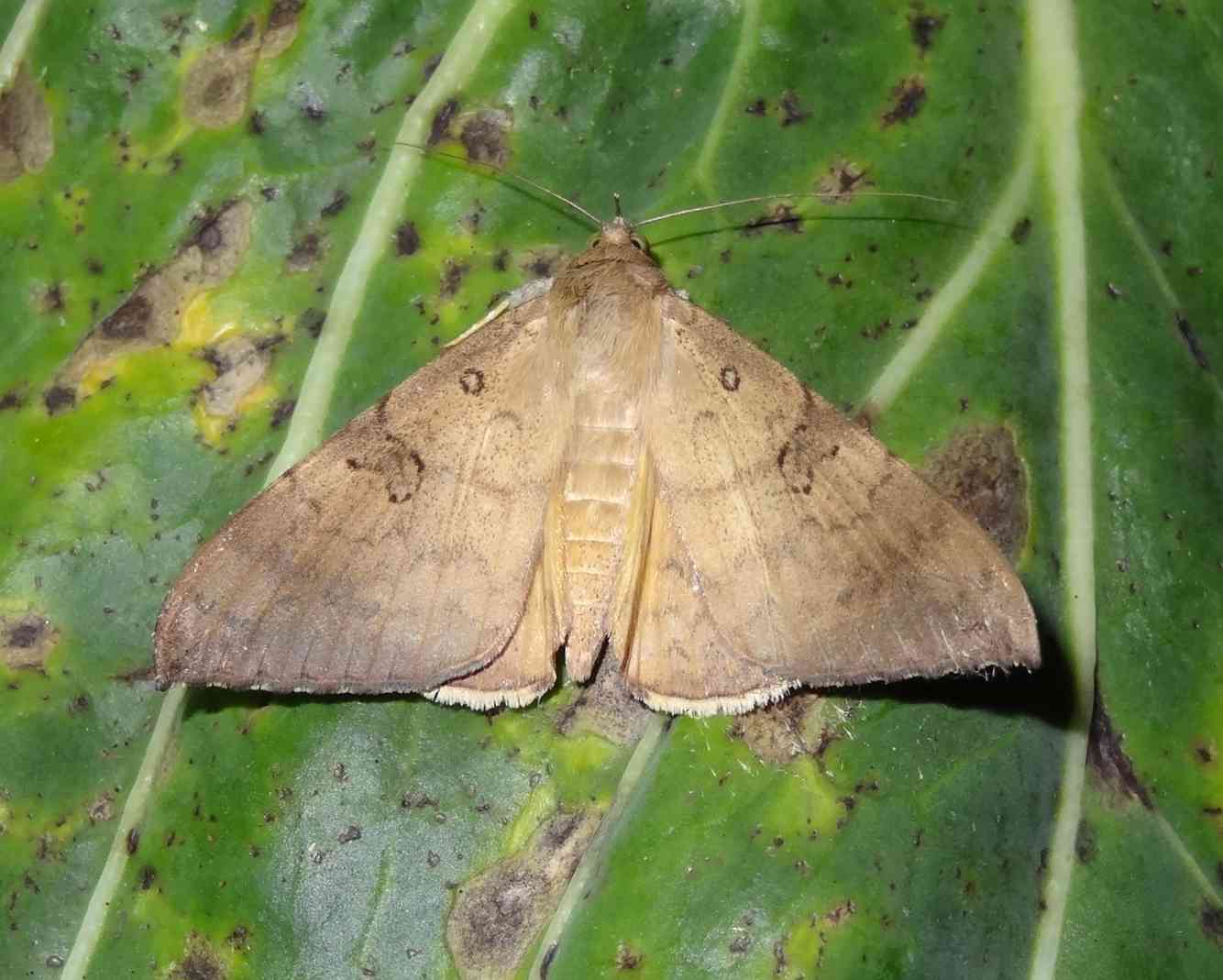

Scientific classification
- Domain: Eukaryota
- Kingdom: Animalia
- Phylum: Arthropoda
- Class: Insecta
- Order: Lepidoptera
- Superfamily: Noctuoidea
- Family: Erebidae
- Genus: Oxyodes
- Species: O. scrobiculata

Binomial name
- Oxyodes scrobiculata (Fabricius, 1775)

Synonyms
- Noctua scrobiculata Fabricius, 1775; Noctua vittata Fabricius, 1775; Phalaena clytia Stoll, 1782; Oxyodes ochreata Rothschild, 1916; Oxyodes ochreata samoana Tams, 1935; Oxyodes ochreata tanymekes Tams, 1935; Oxyodes ochreata novaehebridensis Viette, 1951; Oxyodes scrobiculata Fabricius; Holloway, 1976; Oxyodes scrobiculata obscurior Holloway, 1979

= Oxyodes scrobiculata =

Longan semi-looper

Species of moth

Oxyodes scrobiculata, the longan semi-looper or longan leaf-eating looper, is a moth of the family Erebidae. The common name "looper" is used despite looper moths generally being in the family Geometridae. The species was first described by Johan Christian Fabricius in 1775. It is found in the Indo-Australian tropics of India, Sri Lanka, Myanmar, China, Taiwan, east to Guam, Queensland, New Caledonia, Fiji, Samoa and Tonga.

== Description ==
Its wingspan is about 64 mm. Body ochreous brown or yellow ochreous. Forewing with sub-basal, antemedial, medial, two post-medial and a sub-marginal indistinct waved line present. Orbicular and reniform with black edges and often filled in with black. A lunulate mark often present below the cell. Hindwings with a broad black fascia found below the costa. There are two post-medial lines and an indistinct sub-marginal lunules series can be seen. Ventral side brownish, irrorated (sprinkled) with grey. Both wings with ochreous inner area and a speck at end of cell. A postmedial line and blackish blotches found on outer area.

Larva slender, tapering slightly at each end. Body pale emerald green with fine pale yellow dorsolateral lines. The abdominal pairs are reduced slightly towards the anterior. The larvae feed on Aglaia, Dimocarpus longan, Litchi chinensis and Nephelium lappaceum species.

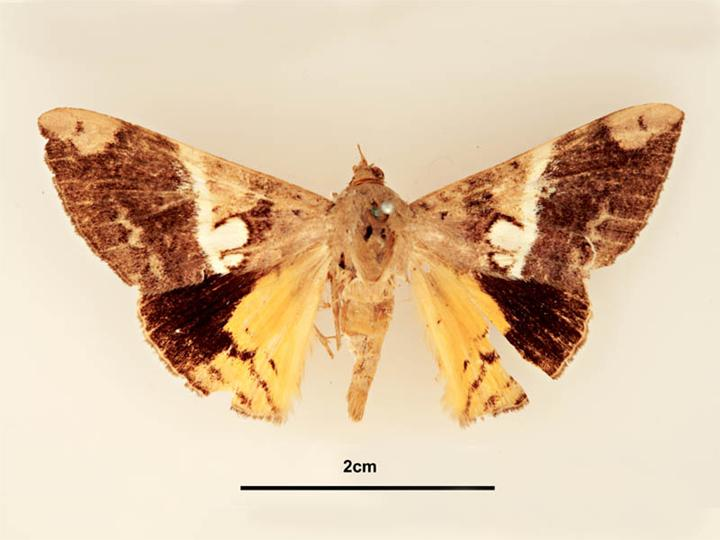
Male

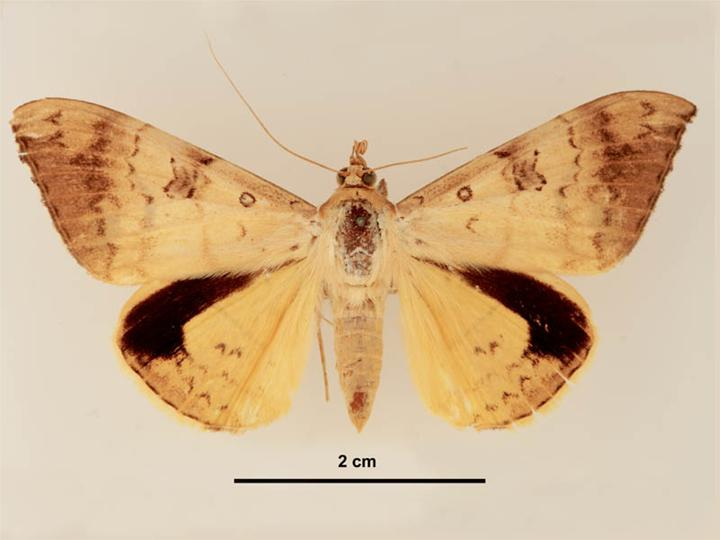
Female
