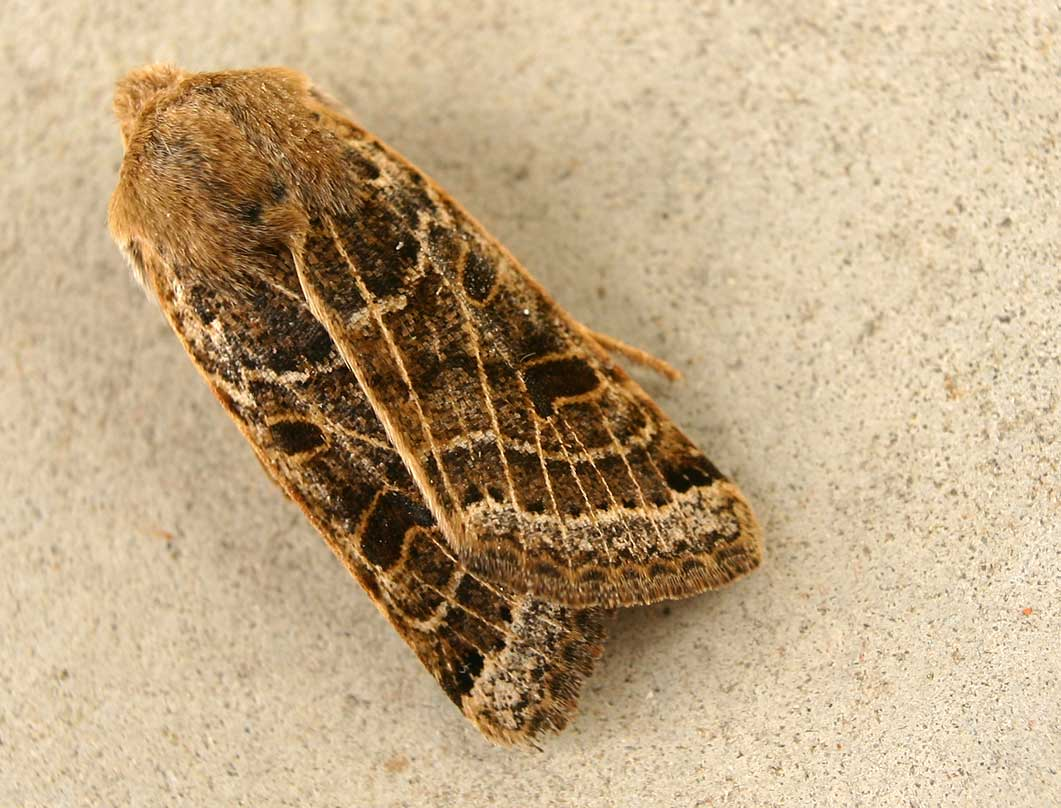

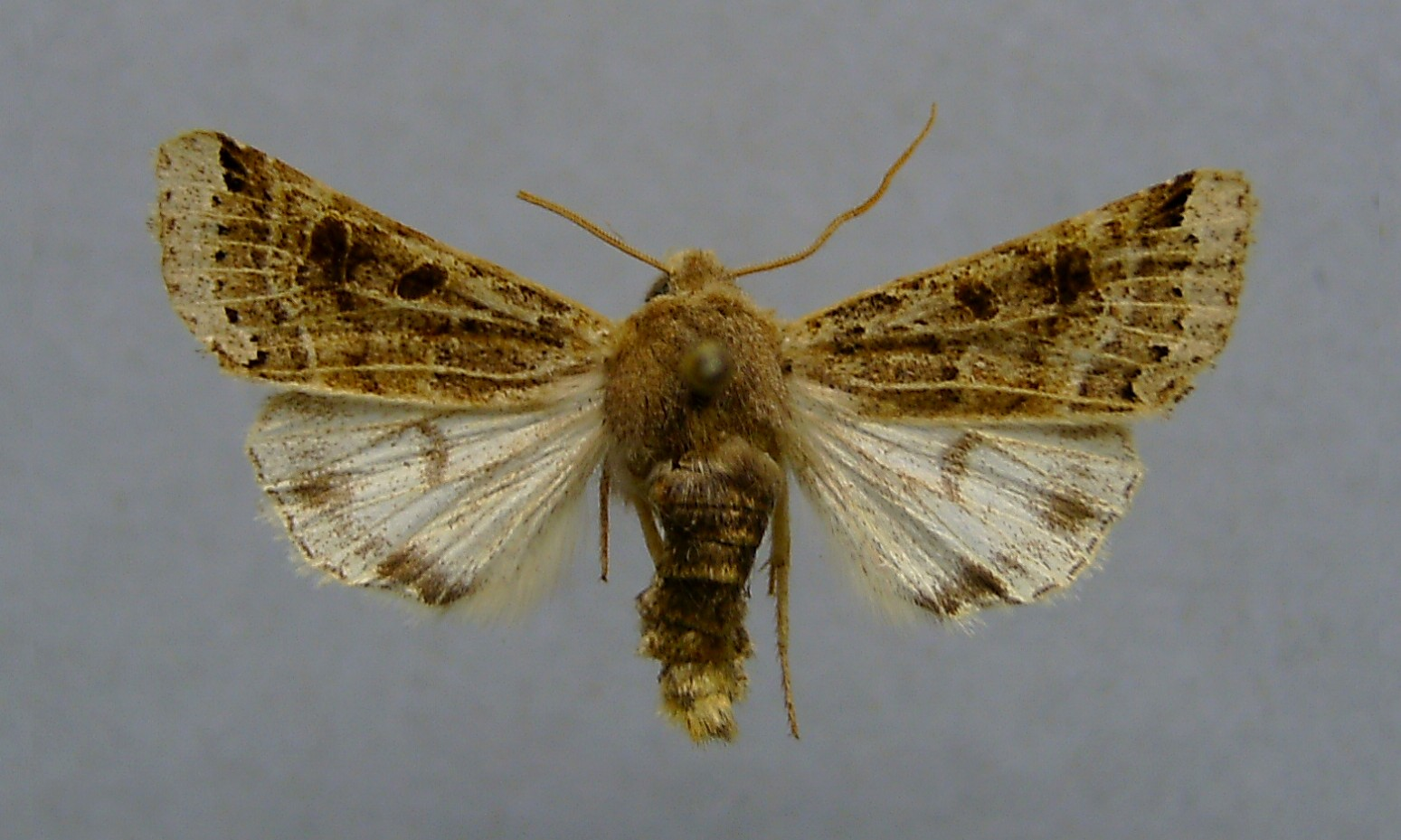

Scientific classification
- Domain: Eukaryota
- Kingdom: Animalia
- Phylum: Arthropoda
- Class: Insecta
- Order: Lepidoptera
- Superfamily: Noctuoidea
- Family: Noctuidae
- Genus: Omphaloscelis
- Species: O. lunosa

Binomial name
- Omphaloscelis lunosa (Haworth, 1809)

= Lunar underwing =

Species of moth

The lunar underwing (Omphaloscelis lunosa) is a moth of the family Noctuidae. The species was first described by Adrian Hardy Haworth in 1809. It has a scattered distribution in western Europe including Spain, Scandinavia and Algeria.

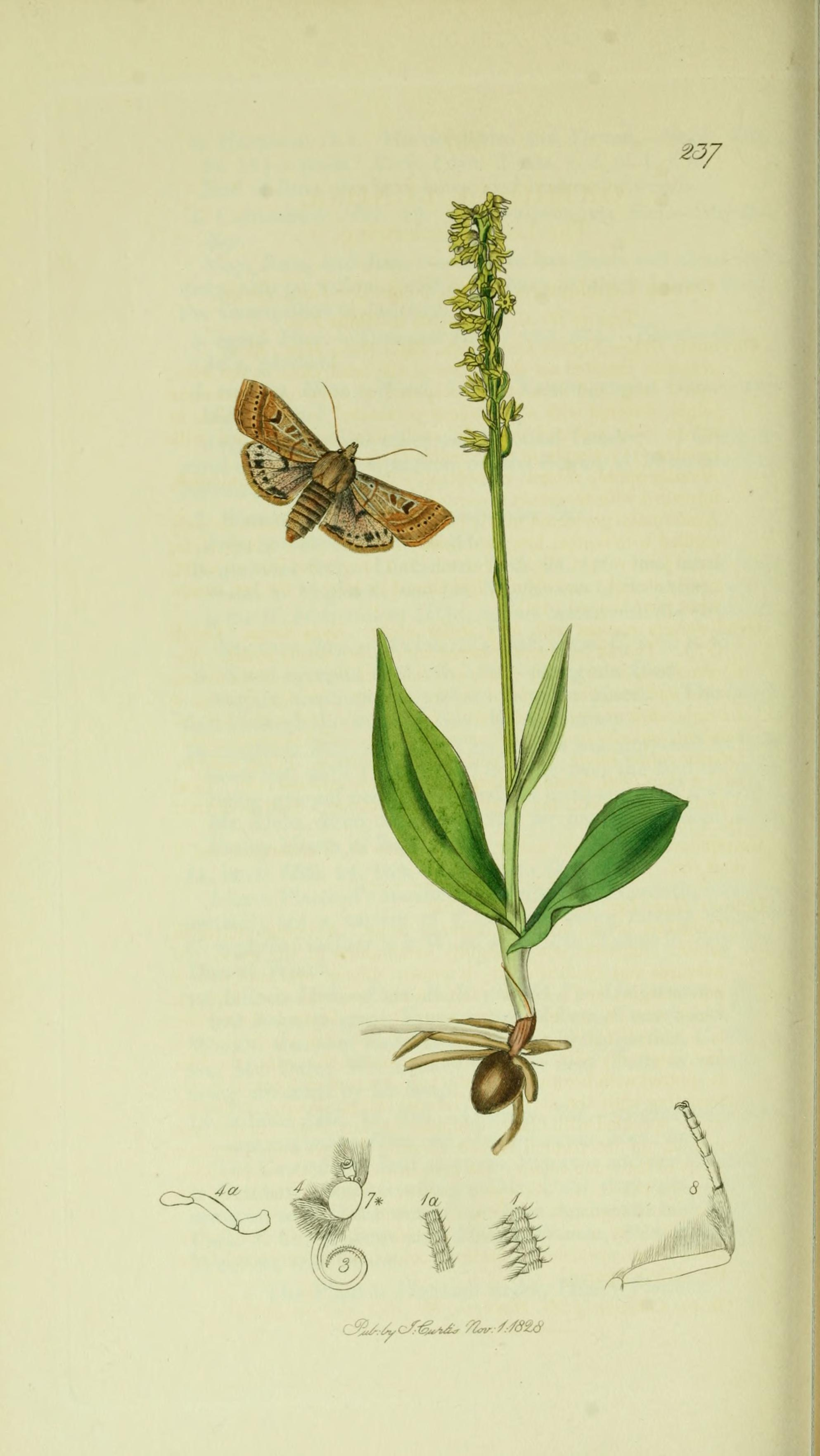
Illustration from John Curtis's British Entomology Volume 5

This is a variable species, the forewings ranging from pale buff to dark brown although the paler forms are generally more common. The forewings are usually marked with two dark stigmata and a black streak near the apex. The hindwings are whitish marked with a dark moon-shaped crescent on the hindwing is partially diagnostic and which gives the moth its English name.

== Description ==
The wingspan is 32–38 mm. Forewing varying from pale greyish ochreous to rufous and dark purple brown, the veins generally pale; upper stigmata distinct and filled up with dark, with distinct pale outlines; inner and outer lines double with paler centres, the inner obliquely curved out, the outer simply sinuous; submarginal line pale, preceded by a row of dark spots, and on costa by a black blotch or bar; hindwing whitish, suffused with grey, especially in the female, with large grey cell spot and interrupted submarginal band. The type form is dull red without pale veins; the red forms with pale veins are ab. rufa Tutt;the palest form of all is obsoleta Tutt without pale nervures; a somewhat darker, more brownish form, with the veins pale is humilis H. & Wwd.; brunnea Tutt has the ground colour deep red-brown with pale veins; in subjecta Dup. it is dark grey brown, the extreme development of which, agrotoides Guen., is blackish grey; — olivacea Vasq., from Spain, has the forewing pale olive ochreous, and rubra Vasq., also from Spain, has it pale reddish ochreous. . The larva is light brownish with dark warts, each with a short brush.

== Biology ==
This moth flies at night from August to October and is attracted to light and flowers.

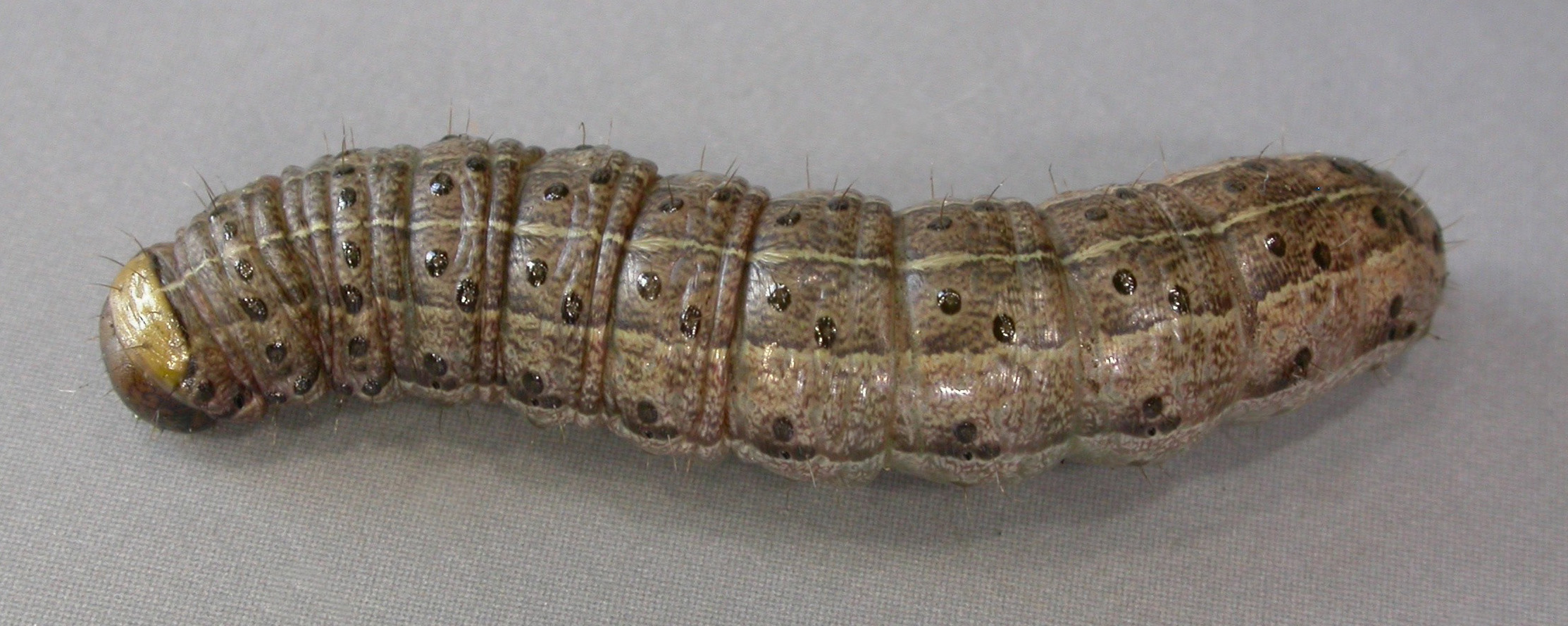

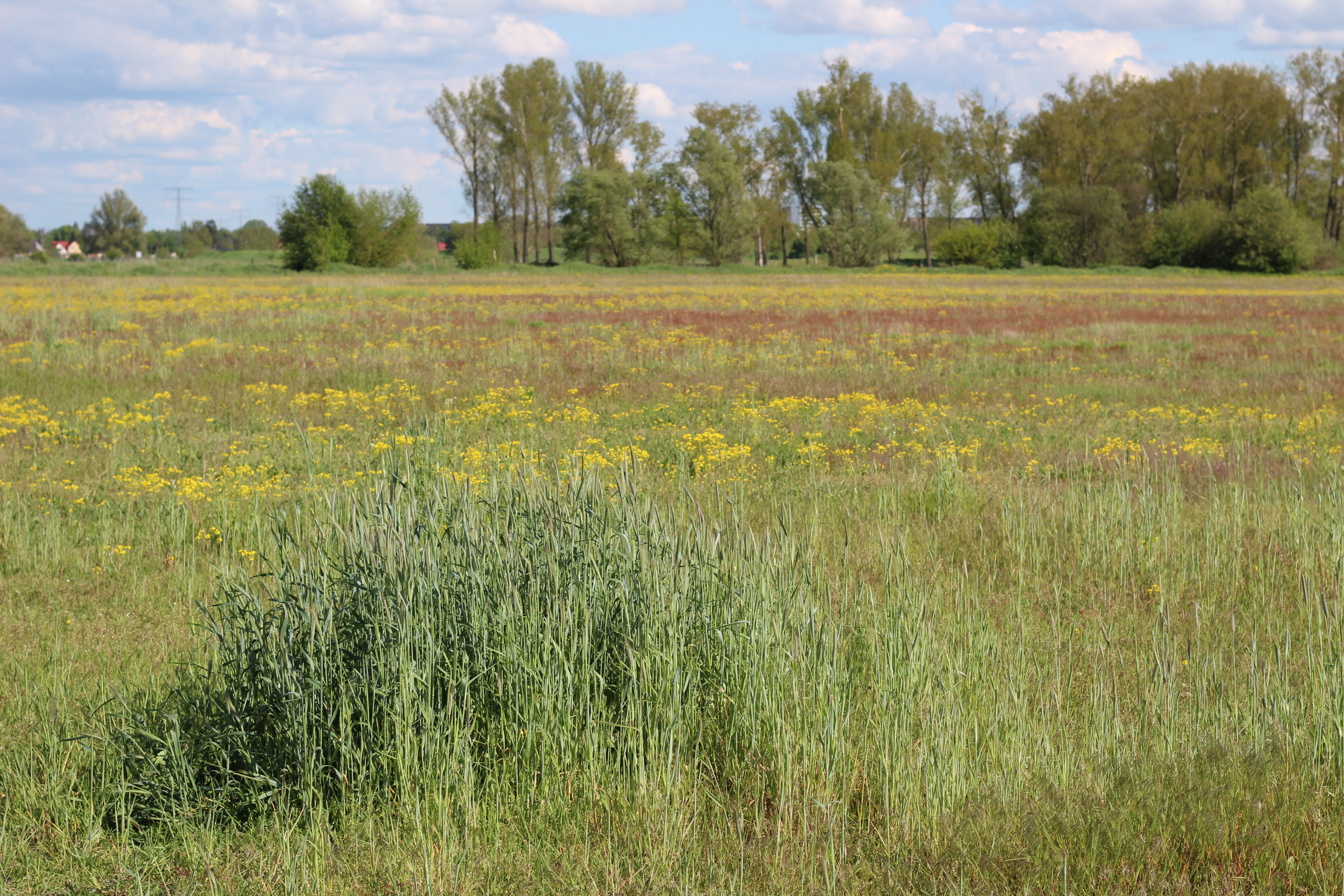
Habitat in Germany

The habitat is grasslands, damp pastures, downland and parks and gardens. The larva feeds on all parts of various grasses, overwintering in this form.

1. The flight season refers to the British Isles. This may vary in other parts of the range.
