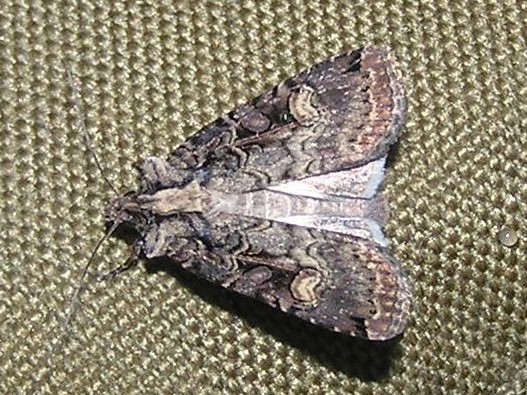

Scientific classification
- Kingdom: Animalia
- Phylum: Arthropoda
- Class: Insecta
- Order: Lepidoptera
- Superfamily: Noctuoidea
- Family: Noctuidae
- Genus: Opigena
- Species: O. polygona

Binomial name
- Opigena polygona (Denis & Schiffermuller, 1775)

Synonyms
- Opygena polygona; Noctua polygona Denis & Schiffermuller, 1775; Phalaena (Noctua) nigrofulva Esper, 1788; Noctua pyramis Borkhausen, 1792

= Opigena polygona =

Species of moth

Opigena polygona is a moth of the family Noctuidae. It is found from the Netherlands, Sweden and Finland, through central and south-eastern Europe to central Asia, northern Iran, the Caucasus, Transcaucasia, Armenia, Turkey, Irkutsk, western and central China, Tibet, Nepal and northern India.

The wingspan is 35–42 mm. Adults are on wing from the end of July to the latter half of September.

The larvae feed on various herbaceous plants, including Capsella, Primula, Polygonum, Rumex and Trifolium.
