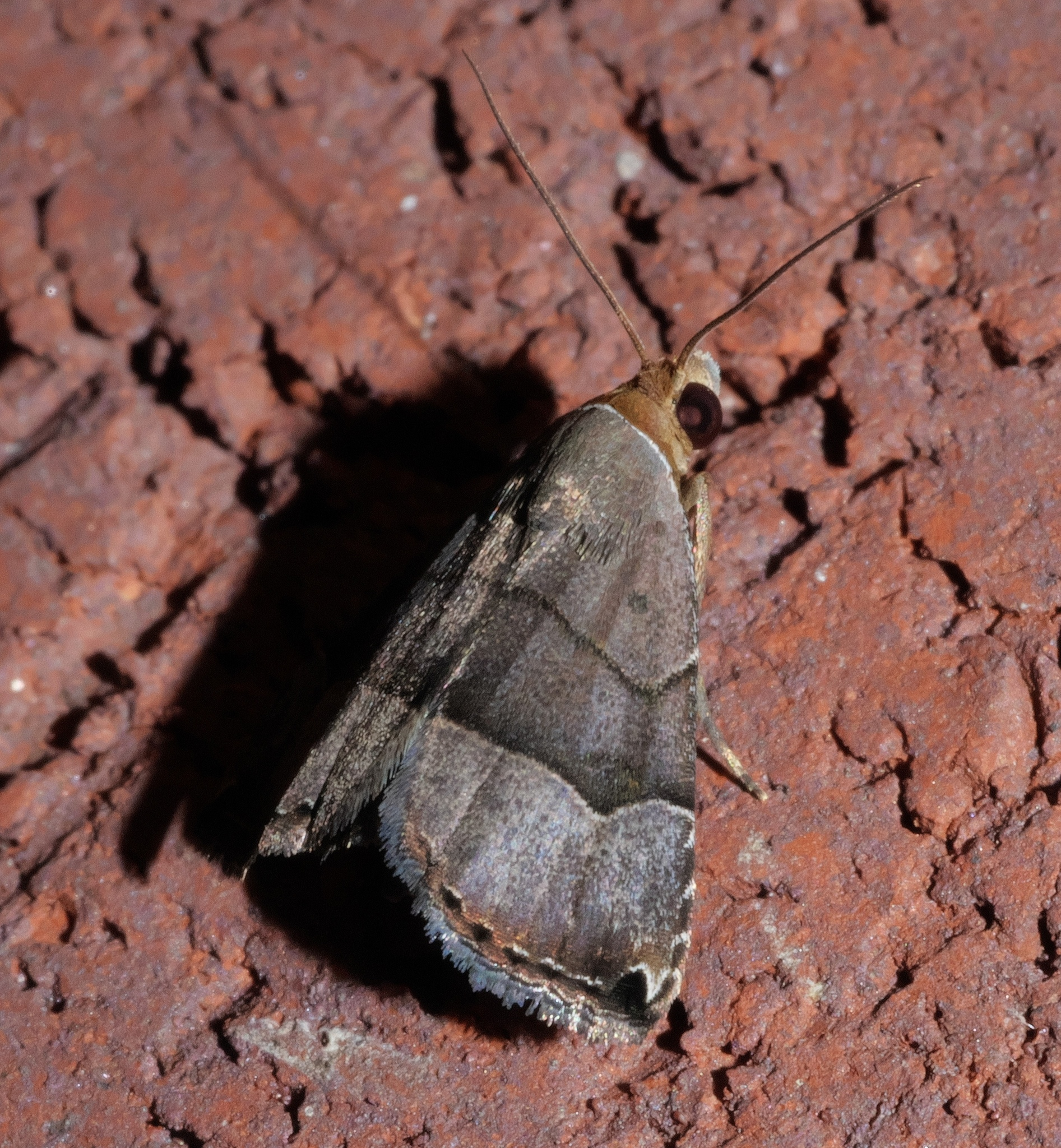
- Ommatochila mundula, Oklahoma

Scientific classification
- Kingdom: Animalia
- Phylum: Arthropoda
- Clade: Pancrustacea
- Class: Insecta
- Order: Lepidoptera
- Superfamily: Noctuoidea
- Family: Erebidae
- Genus: Ommatochila
- Species: O. mundula

Binomial name
- Ommatochila mundula (Zeller, 1872)

= Ommatochila mundula =

Species of moth

Ommatochila mundula is a species of moth in the family Erebidae. It is found in North America.

The MONA or Hodges number for Ommatochila mundula is 8489.
