= Osthopis =

Scientific classification
- Kingdom: Animalia
- Phylum: Arthropoda
- Class: Insecta
- Order: Lepidoptera
- Superfamily: Noctuoidea
- Family: Erebidae
- Subfamily: Calpinae
- Genus: Osthopis; Hampson, 1926
- Species: O. exocausta

Binomial name
- Osthopis exocausta Hampson, 1926

Genus of moths

Osthopis is a monotypic moth genus of the family Erebidae. Its only species, Osthopis exocausta, is found in the Brazilian state of Espírito Santo. Both the genus and species were first described by George Hampson in 1926.
