= Oroplexia retrahens =

Scientific classification
- Kingdom: Animalia
- Phylum: Arthropoda
- Class: Insecta
- Order: Lepidoptera
- Superfamily: Noctuoidea
- Family: Noctuidae
- Genus: Oroplexia
- Species: O. retrahens

Binomial name
- Oroplexia retrahens (Walker, 1857)

Synonyms
- Hadena retrahens Walker, 1857

Species of moth

Oroplexia retrahens is a moth of the family Noctuidae first described by Francis Walker in 1857. It is found in Sri Lanka.
