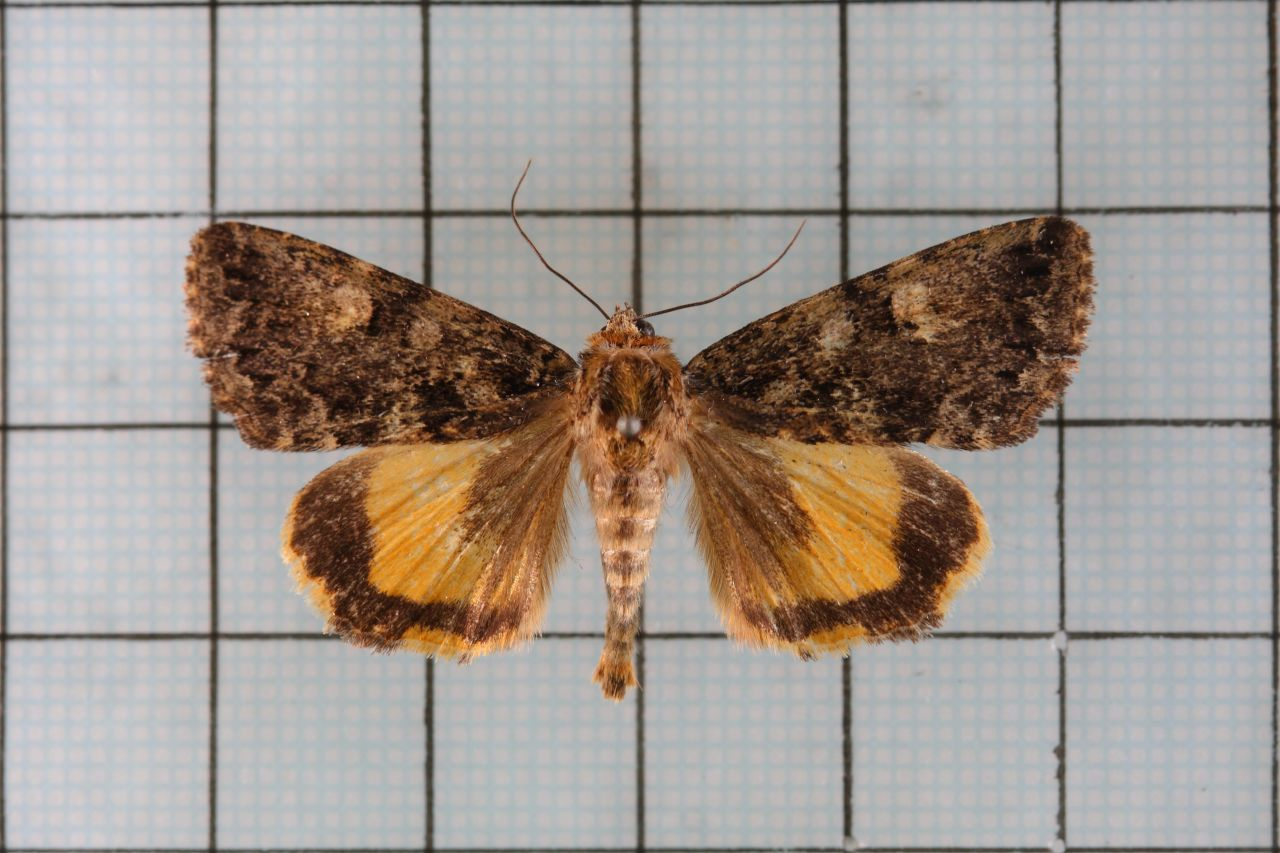

Scientific classification
- Domain: Eukaryota
- Kingdom: Animalia
- Phylum: Arthropoda
- Class: Insecta
- Order: Lepidoptera
- Superfamily: Noctuoidea
- Family: Noctuidae
- Genus: Olivenebula
- Species: O. monticola

Binomial name
- Olivenebula monticola Kishida & Yoshimoto, 1977

= Olivenebula monticola =

Species of moth

Olivenebula monticola is a moth of the family Noctuidae. It is found in Taiwan.
