= Oediblemma =

Scientific classification
- Kingdom: Animalia
- Phylum: Arthropoda
- Class: Insecta
- Order: Lepidoptera
- Superfamily: Noctuoidea
- Family: Noctuidae
- Subfamily: Acontiinae
- Genus: Oediblemma; Hampson, 1918

Synonyms
- Trogocraspis Hampson, 1918

Genus of moths

Oediblemma is a genus of moths of the family Erebidae. The genus was erected by George Hampson in 1918.

== Species ==
- Oediblemma bjoernstadi Hacker, 2019 Tanzania
- Oediblemma caligifusca Hacker, 2019 Kenya, Tanzania
- Oediblemma daloana Hacker, 2019 Ivory Coast
- Oediblemma ipassa Hacker, 2019 Gabon, Nigeria
- Oediblemma ipassina Hacker, 2019 Gabon
- Oediblemma kakuma Hacker, 2019 Ghana
- Oediblemma kigoma Hacker, 2019 Tanzania
- Oediblemma leptinia (Mabille, [1900]) Madagascar
- Oediblemma maritima Hacker, 2019 Gabon
- Oediblemma nigropuncta Hacker, 2019 Gabon
- Oediblemma peregrina Hacker, Fiebig & Stadie, 2019 Ethiopia
- Oediblemma poliogyra Hacker, Fiebig & Stadie, 2019 Uganda
- Oediblemma trogoptera Hampson, 1918 South Africa, Malawi, Botswana, Mozambique, Zimbabwe
