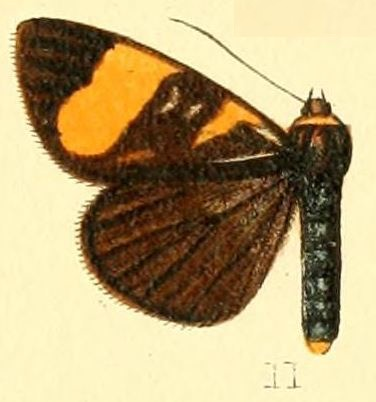

Scientific classification
- Domain: Eukaryota
- Kingdom: Animalia
- Phylum: Arthropoda
- Class: Insecta
- Order: Lepidoptera
- Superfamily: Noctuoidea
- Family: Noctuidae
- Genus: Ophthalmis
- Species: O. darna

Binomial name
- Ophthalmis darna (H. Druce, 1894)

Synonyms
- Agarista darna Druce, 1894

= Ophthalmis darna =

Species of moth

Ophthalmis darna is a moth of the family Noctuidae first described by Herbert Druce in 1894. It is found on Timor, an island at the southern end of Maritime Southeast Asia.
