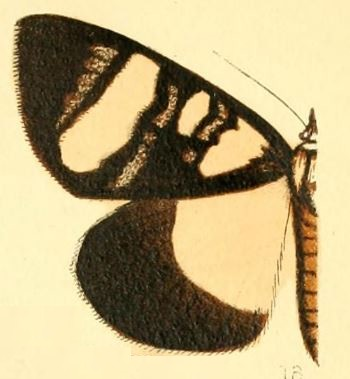

Scientific classification
- Domain: Eukaryota
- Kingdom: Animalia
- Phylum: Arthropoda
- Class: Insecta
- Order: Lepidoptera
- Superfamily: Noctuoidea
- Family: Noctuidae
- Genus: Omphaloceps
- Species: O. daria

Binomial name
- Omphaloceps daria (Druce, 1895)

Synonyms
- Agarista daria Druce, 1895; Aegocera triplagiata Rothschild, 1896; Aegocera triplagiata var. dispar Kirby, 1896; Mitrophrys meraca Karsch, 1898

= Omphaloceps daria =

Species of moth

Omphaloceps daria is a moth of the family Noctuidae. It is found in Malawi, Namibia, Tanzania, Zambia and Zimbabwe.
