= Opsyra =

Scientific classification
- Kingdom: Animalia
- Phylum: Arthropoda
- Class: Insecta
- Order: Lepidoptera
- Superfamily: Noctuoidea
- Family: Noctuidae
- Genus: Opsyra; Hampson, 1908

Genus of moths

Opsyra is a genus of moths of the family Noctuidae.

== Species ==
- Opsyra chalcoela (Hampson, 1902)
