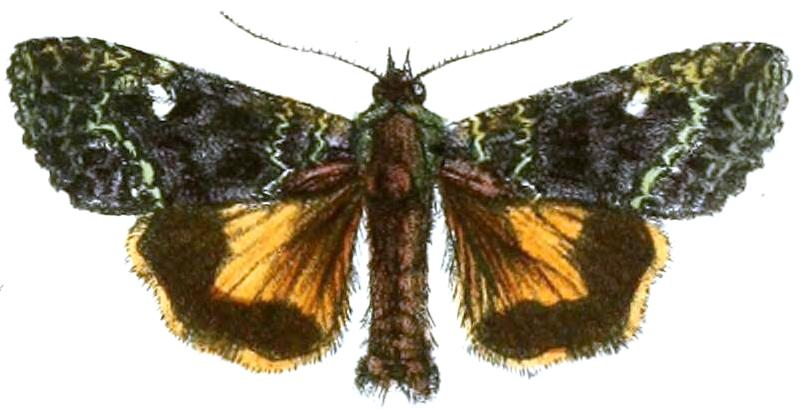

Scientific classification
- Domain: Eukaryota
- Kingdom: Animalia
- Phylum: Arthropoda
- Class: Insecta
- Order: Lepidoptera
- Superfamily: Noctuoidea
- Family: Noctuidae
- Genus: Olivenebula
- Species: O. pulcherrima

Binomial name
- Olivenebula pulcherrima (Moore, 1867)

Synonyms
- Epilecta pulcherrima Moore, 1867; Triphaenopsis pulcherrima; Eliochroea opulenta Butler, 1889; Polyphaenis largeteaui Oberthür, 1881

= Olivenebula pulcherrima =

Species of moth

Olivenebula pulcherrima is a species of moth of the family Noctuidae. It is found in India (Darjeeling, Dharmsala).
