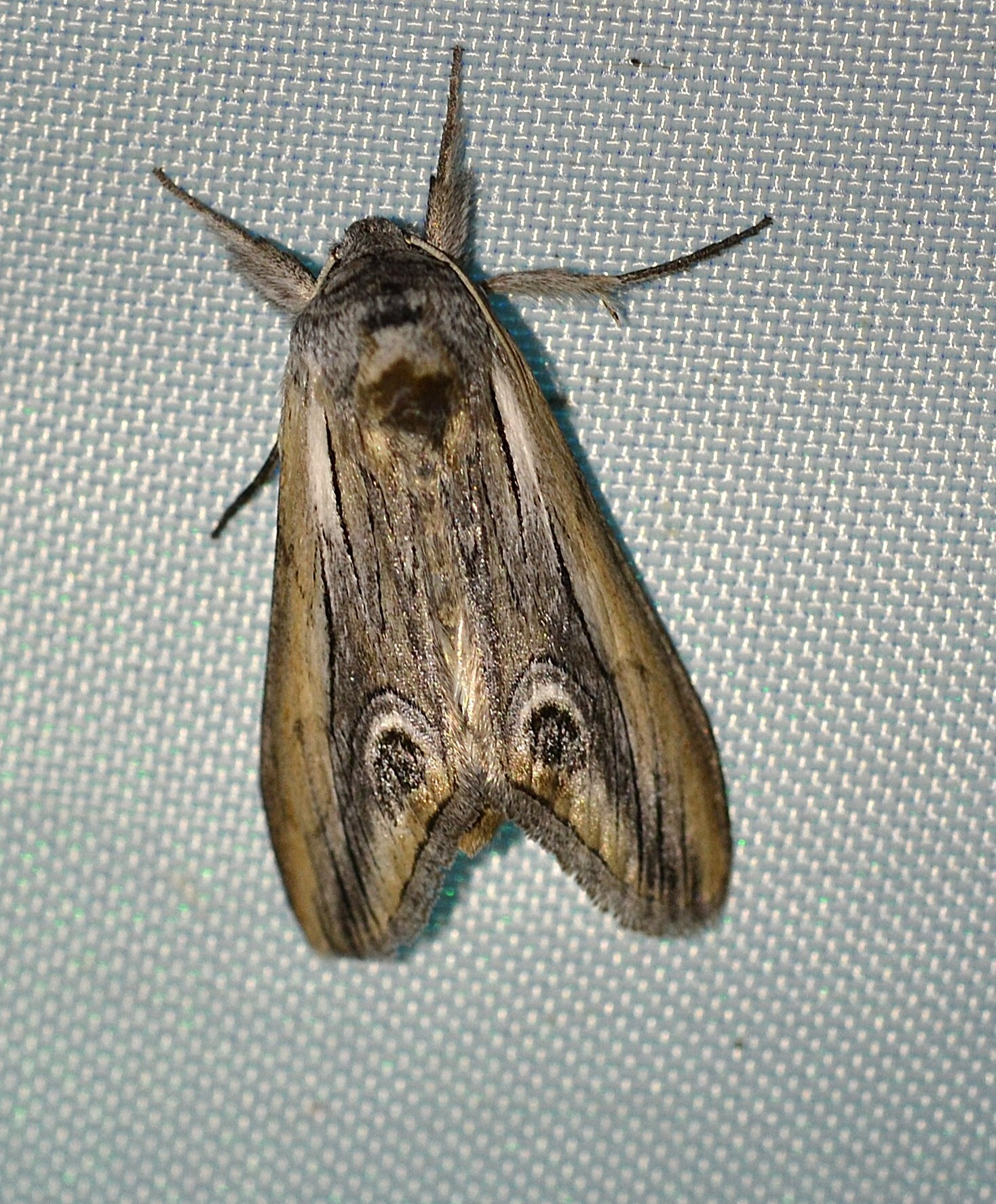

Scientific classification
- Kingdom: Animalia
- Phylum: Arthropoda
- Class: Insecta
- Order: Lepidoptera
- Superfamily: Noctuoidea
- Family: Noctuidae
- Genus: Opsigalea
- Species: O. blanchardi

Binomial name
- Opsigalea blanchardi Todd, 1966

= Opsigalea blanchardi =

Species of moth

Opsigalea blanchardi is a species of owlet moth in the family Noctuidae. It is found in North America.
