= Orthogrammica =

Scientific classification
- Kingdom: Animalia
- Phylum: Arthropoda
- Class: Insecta
- Order: Lepidoptera
- Superfamily: Noctuoidea
- Family: Erebidae
- Subfamily: Calpinae
- Genus: Orthogrammica; Hampson, 1926

Genus of moths

Orthogrammica is a genus of moths of the family Erebidae. The genus was erected by George Hampson, an English entomologist, in 1926.

== Species ==
- Orthogrammica bilineatus (Hampson, 1894)
- Orthogrammica rufitibia Felder, 1874
