= Ommatochila =

Scientific classification
- Domain: Eukaryota
- Kingdom: Animalia
- Phylum: Arthropoda
- Class: Insecta
- Order: Lepidoptera
- Superfamily: Noctuoidea
- Family: Erebidae
- Subfamily: Boletobiinae
- Genus: Ommatochila; Butler, 1894

Genus of moths

Ommatochila is a genus of moths of the family Erebidae. The genus was erected by Arthur Gardiner Butler in 1894.

== Taxonomy ==
Ommatochila has previously been classified in the subfamily Phytometrinae within Erebidae or in the subfamily Acontiinae of the family Noctuidae. The genus is sometimes considered to be a synonym of Abacena.

== Species ==
- Ommatochila chorrera Schaus, 1916 Panama
- Ommatochila crassipalpis Schaus, 1916 Venezuela
- Ommatochila mundula (Zeller, 1872) southern US to Argentina, Antilles
- Ommatochila plumbealis (Walker, [1866]) Amazonas in Brazil
- Ommatochila santucca Schaus, 1916 French Guiana
- Ommatochila stenula Schaus, 1916 Venezuela
