= Oruzodes =

Scientific classification
- Domain: Eukaryota
- Kingdom: Animalia
- Phylum: Arthropoda
- Class: Insecta
- Order: Lepidoptera
- Superfamily: Noctuoidea
- Family: Noctuidae
- Subfamily: Acontiinae
- Genus: Oruzodes; Warren, 1913

Genus of moths

Oruzodes is a genus of moths of the family Noctuidae. The genus was described by Warren in 1913.

== Species ==
- Oruzodes flavilunata Warren, 1913
- Oruzodes unipunctata Bethune-Baker, 1906
