= Pinacia =

Scientific classification
- Kingdom: Animalia
- Phylum: Arthropoda
- Clade: Pancrustacea
- Class: Insecta
- Order: Lepidoptera
- Superfamily: Noctuoidea
- Family: Erebidae
- Subfamily: Hypeninae
- Genus: Pinacia; Hübner, [1831]

Synonyms
- Osericana Walker, [1866]; Mixtila Swinhoe, 1900

Genus of moths

Pinacia is a genus of moths of the family Erebidae. The genus was erected by Jacob Hübner in 1831.

== Species ==
- Pinacia albistella (Walker, [1866]) Peninsular Malaysia, Sumatra, Nias, Borneo, Java, Bail, Philippines (Palawan, Mindanao)
- Pinacia albolineata Snellen, [1886] Sumatra
- Pinacia molybdaenalis Hübner, [1831] Java, Borneo, Sumatra, Lesser Sundas - Tanimbar, Sulawesi
- Pinacia novoguineana (Bethune-Baker, 1906) New Guinea
- Pinacia ocellata (Bethune-Baker, 1908) New Guinea
