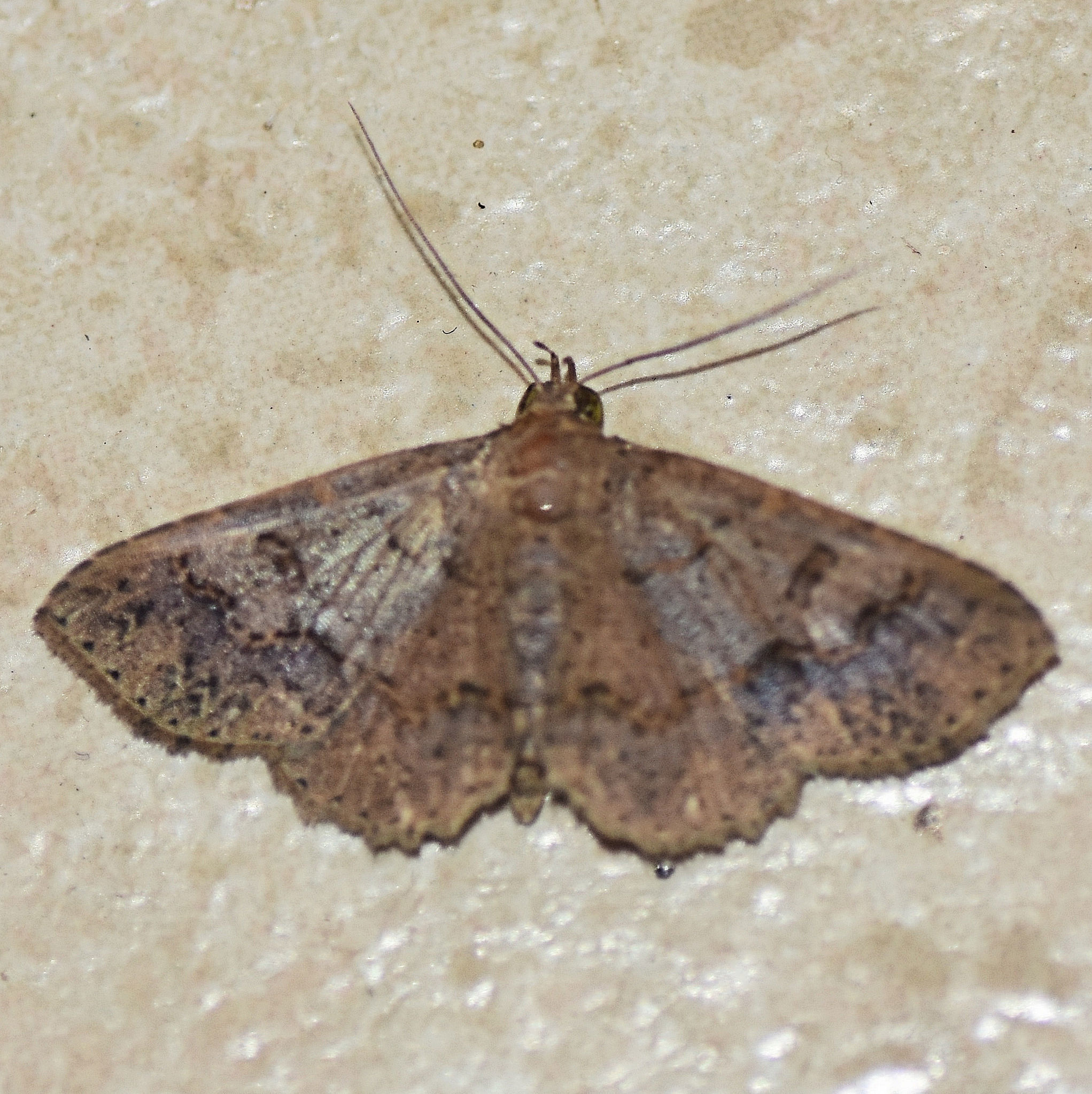
- Ostha concinna

Scientific classification
- Kingdom: Animalia
- Phylum: Arthropoda
- Class: Insecta
- Order: Lepidoptera
- Superfamily: Noctuoidea
- Family: Erebidae
- Subfamily: Calpinae
- Genus: Ostha; Walker, 1861

= Ostha =

Genus of moths

Ostha is a genus of moths in the family Erebidae. The genus was erected by Francis Walker in 1861.

== Species ==
- Ostha aega (Felder & Rogenhofer, 1874) - Brazil (Amazonas)
- Ostha cambogialis Hampson, 1926 - Brazil (Amazonas)
- Ostha concinna Schaus, 1913 - Costa Rica
- Ostha cybele Schaus, 1914 - Guyana
- Ostha diplosticta Hampson, 1926 - Brazil (Espírito Santo)
- Ostha hypsea Schaus, 1913 - Costa Rica
- Ostha hyriaria Hampson, 1926 - Peru
- Ostha memoria Dyar, 1918 - Mexico
- Ostha nomion Schaus, 1913 - Costa Rica
- Ostha oenopion Schaus, 1914 - French Guiana
- Ostha ofella Schaus, 1914 - French Guiana
- Ostha rama Schaus, 1913 - Costa Rica
- Ostha recinna Dognin, 1914 - Guyana
- Ostha sileniata Walker, 1862 - Brazil (Ega)
