= Orthoruza =

Scientific classification
- Domain: Eukaryota
- Kingdom: Animalia
- Phylum: Arthropoda
- Class: Insecta
- Order: Lepidoptera
- Superfamily: Noctuoidea
- Family: Noctuidae
- Subfamily: Acontiinae
- Genus: Orthoruza; Warren in Seitz, 1913
- Species: O. niveipuncta

Binomial name
- Orthoruza niveipuncta Warren, 1913

Genus of moths

Orthoruza is a monotypic moth genus of the family Noctuidae. Its only species, Orthoruza niveipuncta, is found in New Guinea. Both the genus and species were first described by Warren in 1913.
