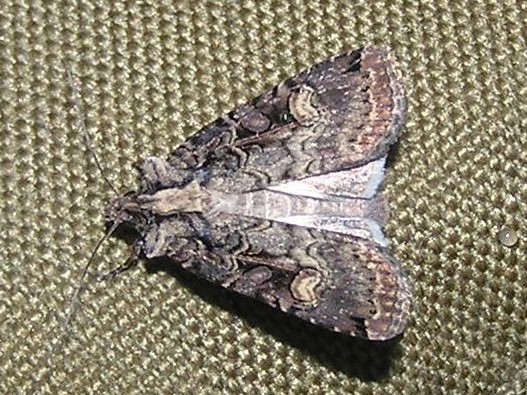

Scientific classification
- Domain: Eukaryota
- Kingdom: Animalia
- Phylum: Arthropoda
- Class: Insecta
- Order: Lepidoptera
- Superfamily: Noctuoidea
- Family: Noctuidae
- Subfamily: Noctuinae
- Genus: Opigena; Boisduval, 1840

= Opigena =

Genus of moths

Opigena is a genus of moths of the family Noctuidae.

== Species ==
- Opigena polygona ([Schiffermüller], 1775)
