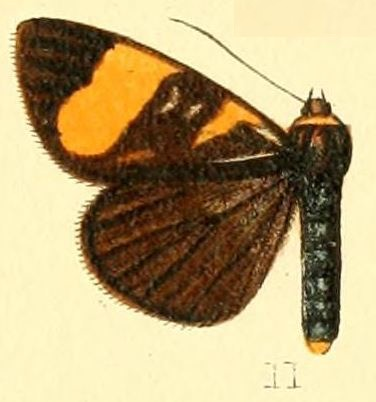
- Ophthalmis darna

Scientific classification
- Kingdom: Animalia
- Phylum: Arthropoda
- Clade: Pancrustacea
- Class: Insecta
- Order: Lepidoptera
- Superfamily: Noctuoidea
- Family: Noctuidae
- Subfamily: Agaristinae
- Genus: Ophthalmis; Hübner, [1819]

= Ophthalmis =

Genus of moths

Ophthalmis is a genus of moths of the family Noctuidae. The genus was erected by Jacob Hübner in 1819.

== Species ==
- Ophthalmis cincta Boisduval, 1874
- Ophthalmis darna H. Druce, 1894
- Ophthalmis floresiana Rothschild, 1897
- Ophthalmis haemorrhoidalis Guérin-Méneville, [1838]
- Ophthalmis lincea Cramer, [1779]
- Ophthalmis milete Cramer, [1775]
- Ophthalmis privata Walker, [1865]
- Ophthalmis swinhoei Semper, 1899
