= Ombrea =

Scientific classification
- Kingdom: Animalia
- Phylum: Arthropoda
- Class: Insecta
- Order: Lepidoptera
- Superfamily: Noctuoidea
- Family: Erebidae
- Subfamily: Calpinae
- Genus: Ombrea; Walker, 1865
- Species: O. aenochromoides

Binomial name
- Ombrea aenochromoides Walker, 1865

Genus of moths

Ombrea is a monotypic moth genus of the family Erebidae. Its only species, Ombrea aenochromoides, is found in Sumatra. Both the genus and species were first described by Francis Walker in 1865.
