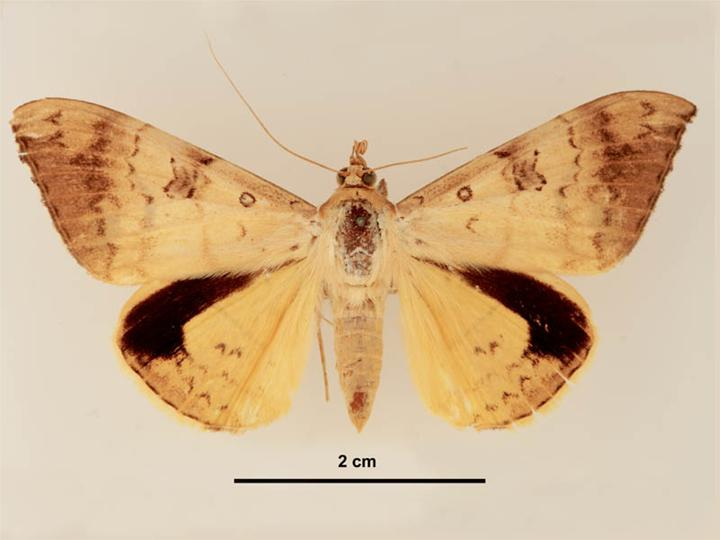
- Oxyodes scrobiculata - Female dorsal

Scientific classification
- Kingdom: Animalia
- Phylum: Arthropoda
- Class: Insecta
- Order: Lepidoptera
- Superfamily: Noctuoidea
- Family: Erebidae
- Subfamily: Erebinae
- Genus: Oxyodes; Guenée in Boisduval & Guenée, 1852

= Oxyodes =

Genus of moths

Oxyodes is a genus of moths of the family Noctuidae erected by Achille Guenée in 1852.

== Description ==
Palpi upturned and smoothly scaled, where the second joint reaching vertex of head. Third joint long. Antennae almost simple. Thorax and abdomen smoothly scaled and somewhat slender. Tibia spineless. Fore tibia hairy. Forewings with produced and acute apex. Outer margin slightly excised and crenulate cilia.

== Species ==
- Oxyodes scrobiculata (Fabricius, 1775)
- Oxyodes tricolor Guenée, 1852
