= Oroscopa =

Scientific classification
- Domain: Eukaryota
- Kingdom: Animalia
- Phylum: Arthropoda
- Class: Insecta
- Order: Lepidoptera
- Superfamily: Noctuoidea
- Family: Erebidae
- Subfamily: Calpinae
- Genus: Oroscopa; H. Druce in Godman & Salvin, 1891

Genus of moths

Oroscopa is a genus of moths of the family Erebidae. The genus was erected by Herbert Druce in 1891.

== Species ==
- Oroscopa belus Schaus, 1914 Panama
- Oroscopa calverti Schaus, 1911 Costa Rica
- Oroscopa concha H. Druce, 1891 Panama
- Oroscopa cordobensis Schaus, 1916 Mexico
- Oroscopa diascia Hampson, 1924 Trinidad
- Oroscopa electrona Schaus, 1916 Brazil (Rio de Janeiro)
- Oroscopa hacupha Schaus, 1911 Costa Rica
- Oroscopa microdonta Hampson, 1924 Trinidad
- Oroscopa noctifera Schaus, 1912 French Guiana
- Oroscopa privigna (Möschler, 1880) Costa Rica, French Guiana, Surinam
- Oroscopa punctata H. Druce, 1891 Panama
- Oroscopa variegata Hampson, 1926 Peru
