= Ortospana =

Scientific classification
- Kingdom: Animalia
- Phylum: Arthropoda
- Class: Insecta
- Order: Lepidoptera
- Superfamily: Noctuoidea
- Family: Noctuidae (?)
- Subfamily: Catocalinae
- Genus: Ortospana; Walker, 1865
- Species: O. connectens

Binomial name
- Ortospana connectens Walker, 1865

Genus of moths

Ortospana is a genus of moths of the family Noctuidae. Its only species, Ortospana connectens, is known from Sri Lanka. Both the genus and species were first described by Francis Walker in 1865.
