= Orotermes =

Scientific classification
- Domain: Eukaryota
- Kingdom: Animalia
- Phylum: Arthropoda
- Class: Insecta
- Order: Lepidoptera
- Superfamily: Noctuoidea
- Family: Erebidae
- Subfamily: Calpinae
- Genus: Orotermes; Dognin, 1919

Genus of moths

Orotermes is a genus of moths of the family Erebidae. The genus was erected by Paul Dognin in 1919. The species are found in French Guiana.

== Species ==
- Orotermes hermieri Barbut & Lalanne-Cassou, 2007
- Orotermes monstrosa Dognin, 1919
- Orotermes japyx (Schaus, 1914)
