= Oidemastis =

Scientific classification
- Domain: Eukaryota
- Kingdom: Animalia
- Phylum: Arthropoda
- Class: Insecta
- Order: Lepidoptera
- Superfamily: Noctuoidea
- Family: Erebidae
- Subfamily: Herminiinae
- Genus: Oidemastis; Schaus, 1916
- Species: O. caliginosa

Binomial name
- Oidemastis caliginosa Schaus, 1916

Genus of moths

Oidemastis is a monotypic moth genus of the family Erebidae. Its only species, Oidemastis caliginosa, is found in French Guiana. Both the genus and the species were first described by William Schaus in 1916.
