= Otaces =

Scientific classification
- Domain: Eukaryota
- Kingdom: Animalia
- Phylum: Arthropoda
- Class: Insecta
- Order: Lepidoptera
- Superfamily: Noctuoidea
- Family: Erebidae
- Subfamily: Herminiinae
- Genus: Otaces; H. Druce in Godman & Salvin, 1891
- Species: O. lineata

Binomial name
- Otaces lineata H. Druce, 1891

Genus of moths

Otaces is a monotypic moth genus of the family Erebidae. Its only species, Otaces lineata, is known from Panama. Both the genus and the species were first described by Herbert Druce in 1891.
