= Orsa (moth) =

Scientific classification
- Domain: Eukaryota
- Kingdom: Animalia
- Phylum: Arthropoda
- Class: Insecta
- Order: Lepidoptera
- Superfamily: Noctuoidea
- Family: Erebidae
- Subfamily: Calpinae
- Genus: Orsa; Walker, 1865

Genus of moths

Orsa is a genus of moths of the family Erebidae. The genus was erected by Francis Walker in 1865.

== Species ==
- Orsa deleta Hampson, 1924 Trinidad
- Orsa erythrospila Walker, 1865 Brazil (Amazonas)
- Orsa orbifera Hampson, 1926 Brazil (Espírito Santo)
- Orsa tenuata Kaye, 1901 Trinidad
