= Ozana =

Scientific classification
- Kingdom: Animalia
- Phylum: Arthropoda
- Clade: Pancrustacea
- Class: Insecta
- Order: Lepidoptera
- Superfamily: Noctuoidea
- Family: Noctuidae
- Subfamily: Acontiinae
- Genus: Ozana; Berio, 1950
- Species: O. chinensis

Binomial name
- Ozana chinensis (Leech, 1900)

Synonyms
- Metachrostis chinensis Leech, 1900

Genus of moths

Ozana is a monotypic moth genus in the family Noctuidae erected by Emilio Berio in 1950. Its only species, Ozana chinensis, was first described by John Henry Leech in 1900. It is found in China.

== Subspecies ==
- Ozana chinensis chinensis (Leech, 1900)
- Ozana chinensis indica Warren, 1913
