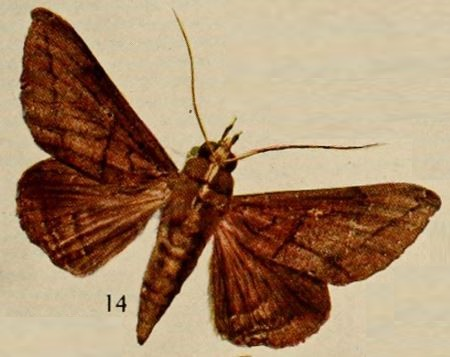
- Ogovia aliena

Scientific classification
- Domain: Eukaryota
- Kingdom: Animalia
- Phylum: Arthropoda
- Class: Insecta
- Order: Lepidoptera
- Superfamily: Noctuoidea
- Family: Erebidae
- Subfamily: Calpinae
- Genus: Ogovia; Holland, 1892

Synonyms
- Tolnosphingia Berio, 1964

= Ogovia =

Genus of moths

Ogovia is a genus of moths of the family Erebidae. The genus was erected by William Jacob Holland in 1892.

== Species ==
- Ogovia aliena (Holland, 1920) Ghana, Zaire
- Ogovia alticola Laporte, 1974 Cameroon
- Ogovia bolengensis (Holland, 1920) Zaire
- Ogovia ebenaui (Viette, 1965) Madagascar
- Ogovia pudens (Holland, 1894) Sierra Leone, Ivory Coast, Cameroon, Congo, Zaire, Gabon, South Africa, Tanzania, Zimbabwe
- Ogovia tavetensis Holland, 1892 Cameroon, Zaire, Tanzania, Zimbabwe
