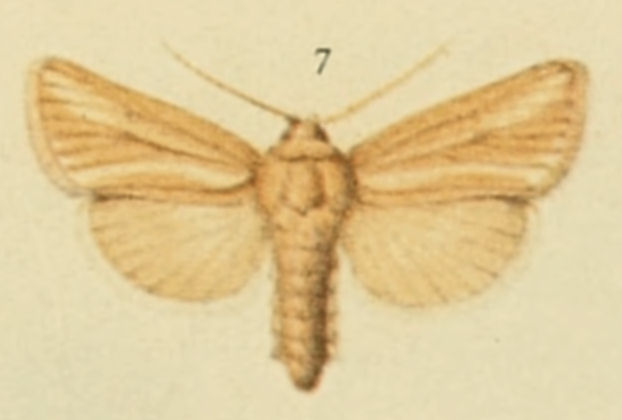

Scientific classification
- Kingdom: Animalia
- Phylum: Arthropoda
- Clade: Pancrustacea
- Class: Insecta
- Order: Lepidoptera
- Superfamily: Noctuoidea
- Family: Noctuidae
- Genus: Oria; Hübner, 1821

= Oria (moth) =

Genus of moths

Oria is a genus of moths of the family Noctuidae.

== Species ==
- Oria flavescens (Hampson, 1902)
- Oria musculosa (Hübner, [1808])
- Oria myodea (Rambur, 1858)
