= Ortopla =

Scientific classification
- Kingdom: Animalia
- Phylum: Arthropoda
- Class: Insecta
- Order: Lepidoptera
- Superfamily: Noctuoidea
- Family: Erebidae
- Subfamily: Calpinae
- Genus: Ortopla; Walker, [1859]

Synonyms
- Oromena Moore, 1882; Kotoplax Hampson, 1891; Koptoplax Hampson, 1891

Genus of moths

Ortopla is a genus of moths of the family Erebidae. The genus was erected by Francis Walker in 1859.

== Species ==
- Ortopla commutanda (Warren, 1891)
- Ortopla iarbasalis Walker, [1859] Borneo
- Ortopla lindsayi (Hampson, 1891) India (Tamil Nadu)
- Ortopla noduna (Swinhoe, 1905) Sri Lanka
- Ortopla relinquenda (Walker, 1858) northern India
