= Oxaenanus =

Scientific classification
- Domain: Eukaryota
- Kingdom: Animalia
- Phylum: Arthropoda
- Class: Insecta
- Order: Lepidoptera
- Superfamily: Noctuoidea
- Family: Erebidae
- Subfamily: Herminiinae
- Genus: Oxaenanus; C. Swinhoe, 1900

Genus of moths

Oxaenanus is a genus of moths of the family Erebidae. The genus was erected by Charles Swinhoe in 1900.

== Species ==
- Oxaenanus brontesalis (Walker, [1859]) Borneo, north-east Himalayas, Myanmar, Thailand, Peninsular Malaysia, Sumatra, Philippines
- Oxaenanus kalialis Swinhoe, 1900 Borneo, Sumatra
- Oxaenanus kerangatis Holloway, 2008 Borneo
- Oxaenanus parvikalialis Holloway, 2008 Borneo
- Oxaenanus picticilia (Hampson, 1896) Sri Lanka
