= Olulis =

Scientific classification
- Kingdom: Animalia
- Phylum: Arthropoda
- Class: Insecta
- Order: Lepidoptera
- Superfamily: Noctuoidea
- Family: Erebidae
- Subfamily: Calpinae
- Genus: Olulis; Walker, 1863

Type species
- Olulis puncticinctalis Walker, 1863

Synonyms
- Hamaxia Walker, 1863; Phachthia Walker, 1864

Genus of moths

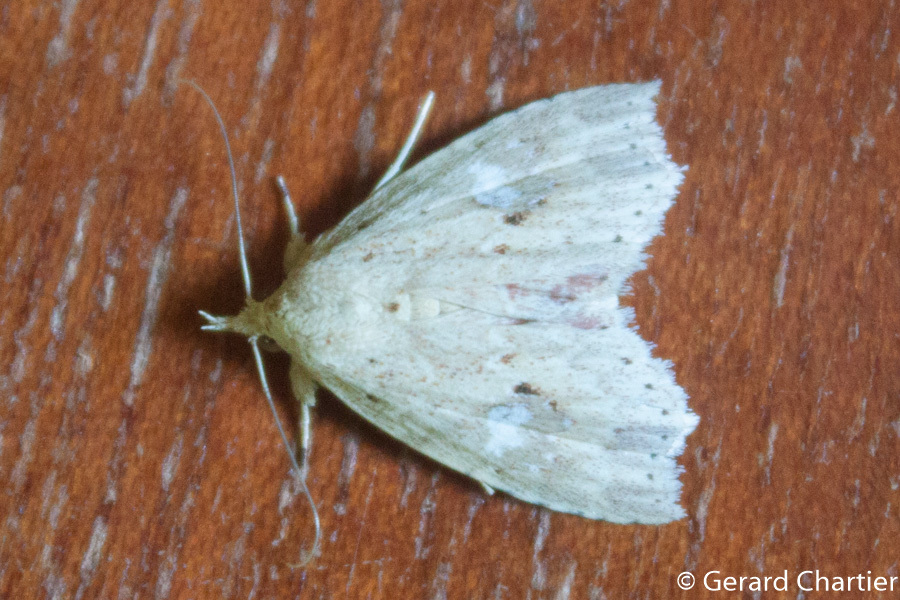

Olulis is a genus in the moth family Erebidae. There are about eight described species in Olulis, found in South, Southeast, and East Asia, and in Australia.

This genus was first described by Francis Walker in 1863.

== Description ==
Palpi with second joint reaching above vertex of head, and long third joint naked. Antennae ciliated. Thorax and abdomen without tufts. Mid legs of male with a large hair from base of tibia. Forewings long and narrow with acute apex. The outer margin angled at middle. Veins 8 to 10 from before the angle and stalked. Hindwings with stalked veins 3 and 4. Veins 5 from near middle of discocellulars.

== Species ==
These eight species belong to the genus Olulis:

- Olulis albilineata Hampson, 1926
- Olulis lactigutta Hampson, 1907
- Olulis megalopis Hampson, 1926 (placement uncertain)
- Olulis methaema Hampson, 1926
- Olulis postrosea Hampson, 1926
- Olulis puncticinctalis Walker, 1863
- Olulis rosacea Bethune-Baker, 1908
- Olulis subrosea Turner, 1908
