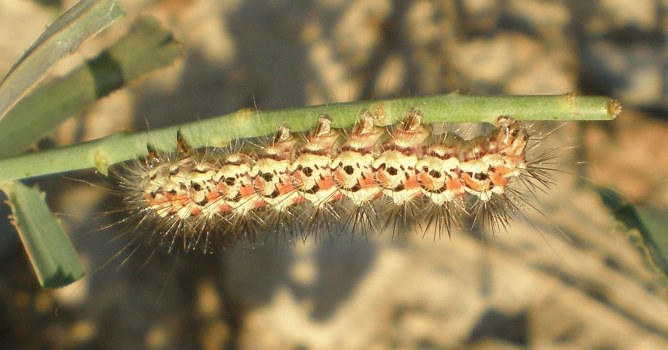
- Oxicesta serratae (Tàrrega, Catalonia)

Scientific classification
- Kingdom: Animalia
- Phylum: Arthropoda
- Clade: Pancrustacea
- Class: Insecta
- Order: Lepidoptera
- Superfamily: Noctuoidea
- Family: Noctuidae
- Genus: Oxicesta; Hübner, [1819]

= Oxicesta =

Genus of moths

Oxicesta is a genus of moths of the family Noctuidae.

== Species ==
- Oxicesta geographica Fabricius, 1787
- Oxicesta nervosa Villers, 1789
- Oxicesta serratae Zerny, 1927
