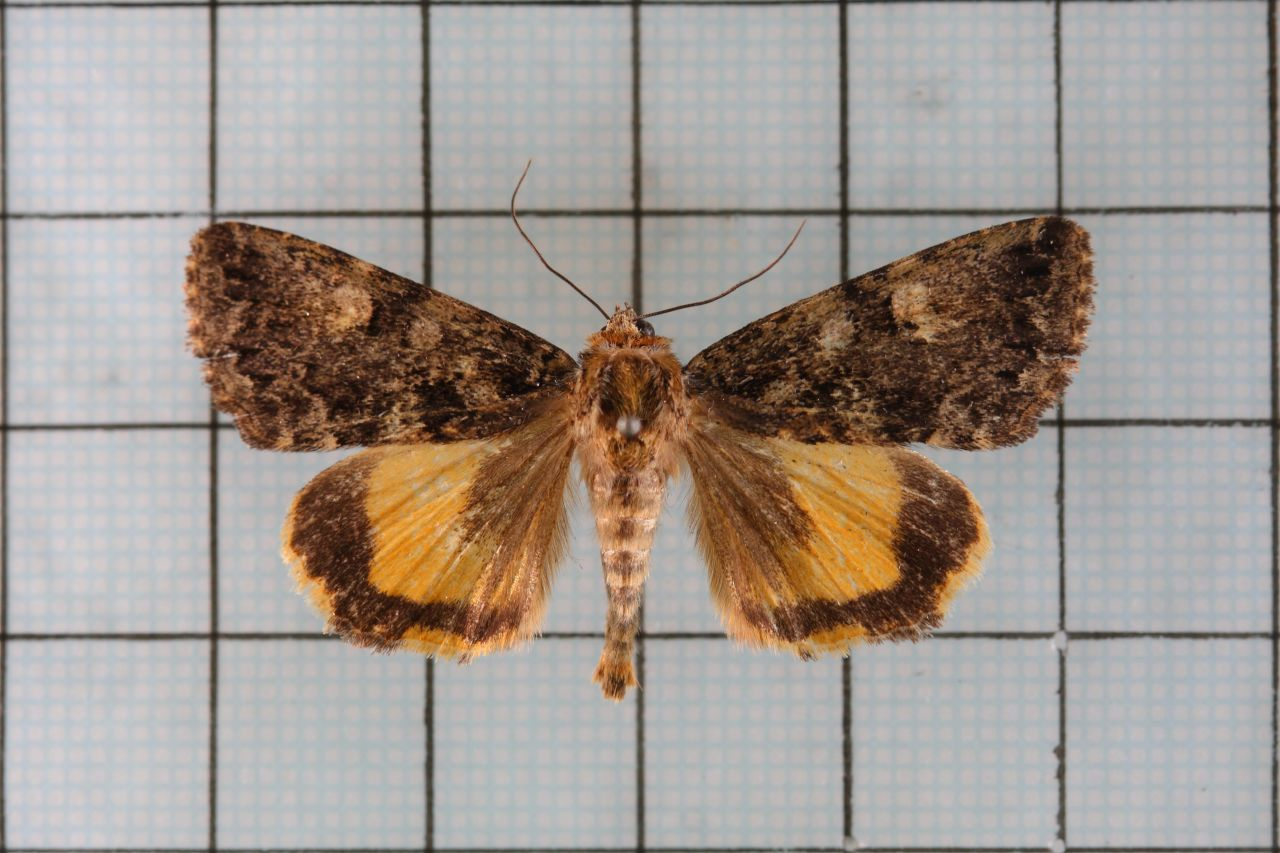
- Olivenebula monticola

Scientific classification
- Domain: Eukaryota
- Kingdom: Animalia
- Phylum: Arthropoda
- Class: Insecta
- Order: Lepidoptera
- Superfamily: Noctuoidea
- Family: Noctuidae
- Genus: Olivenebula; Kishita & Yoshimoto, 1977

Synonyms
- Chlorothalpa Beck, 1996; Subthalpa Beck, 1996

= Olivenebula =

Genus of moths

Olivenebula is a genus of moths of the family Noctuidae.

== Species ==
- Olivenebula confecta (Walker, 1865)
- Olivenebula monticola Kishida & Yoshimoto, 1977
- Olivenebula oberthueri (Staudinger, 1892)
- Olivenebula pulcherrima (Moore, 1867)
- Olivenebula subsericata (Herrich-Schäffer, 1861)
- Olivenebula xanthochloris (Boisduval, 1840)
