= Omorphina =

Scientific classification
- Domain: Eukaryota
- Kingdom: Animalia
- Phylum: Arthropoda
- Class: Insecta
- Order: Lepidoptera
- Superfamily: Noctuoidea
- Family: Noctuidae
- Subfamily: Plusiinae
- Genus: Omorphina; Alphéraky, 1892

Genus of moths

Omorphina is a genus of moths of the monotypic tribe Omorphini of the subfamily Plusiinae.

== Species ==
- Omorphina aurantiaca Alphéraky, 1892
