= Obarza =

Scientific classification
- Domain: Eukaryota
- Kingdom: Animalia
- Phylum: Arthropoda
- Class: Insecta
- Order: Lepidoptera
- Superfamily: Noctuoidea
- Family: Noctuidae
- Subfamily: Acontiinae
- Genus: Obarza; Berio, 1950
- Species: O. zernyi

Binomial name
- Obarza zernyi (Berio, 1940)

Synonyms
- Ozarba zernyi Berio, 1940

Genus of moths

Obarza is a monotypic moth genus of the family Noctuidae. Its only species, Obarza zernyi, is found in the Brazilian state of Santa Catarina. Both the genus and species were first described by Emilio Berio, the genus in 1950 and the species 10 years earlier in 1940.
