= Olulodes =

Scientific classification
- Domain: Eukaryota
- Kingdom: Animalia
- Phylum: Arthropoda
- Class: Insecta
- Order: Lepidoptera
- Superfamily: Noctuoidea
- Family: Erebidae
- Subfamily: Calpinae
- Genus: Olulodes; Bethune-Baker, 1908
- Species: O. pulchra

Binomial name
- Olulodes pulchra Bethune-Baker, 1908

Genus of moths

Olulodes is a monotypic moth genus of the family Erebidae. Its only species, Olulodes pulchra, is found in New Guinea. Both the genus and the species were first described by George Thomas Bethune-Baker in 1908.
