= George Hampson =

English entomologist (1860–1936)

Sir George Francis Hampson, 10th Baronet (14 January 1860 – 15 October 1936) was an English entomologist.

Hampson studied at Charterhouse School and Exeter College, Oxford. He travelled to India to become a tea-planter in the Nilgiri Hills of the Madras presidency (now Tamil Nadu), where he became interested in moths and butterflies. When he returned to England, he became a voluntary worker at the Natural History Museum, where he wrote The Lepidoptera of the Nilgiri District (1891) and The Lepidoptera Heterocera of Ceylon (1893) as parts 8 and 9 of Illustrations of Typical Specimens of Lepidoptera Heterocera of the British Museum. He then commenced work on The Fauna of British India, Including Ceylon and Burma: Moths (four volumes, 1892–1896).

In March 1895, Albert Günther offered Hampson a position as an assistant at the museum, and after succeeding to his baronetcy in 1896, he was promoted to the acting assistant keeper in 1901. He then worked on a Catalogue of the Lepidoptera Phalaenae in the British Museum (15 volumes, 1898–1920).

Orthogrammica, a genus of moths of the family Erebidae, was erected by Hampson in 1926.

Hampson married Minnie Frances Clark-Kennedy on 1 June 1893 and had three children.

== Sources ==
- The Natural History Museum at South Kensington William T. Stearn ISBN 0-434-73600-7
- Leigh Rayment's list of baronets

Baronetage of England
Preceded by George Francis Hampson	Baronet (of Taplow); 1896–1936	Succeeded by Dennys Francis Hampson
