= List of noctuid genera: S =

The huge moth family Noctuidae contains the following genera:

A B C D E F G H I J K L M N O P Q R S T U V W X Y Z

- Saalmuellerana
- Saaluncifera
- Sablia
- Sacadodes
- Saccharophagos
- Sadarsa
- Safia
- Safidia
- Saigonita
- Sajania
- Salia
- Saltia
- Sanacea
- Sanctflorentia
- Sandava
- Santiaxis
- Sanys
- Sapporia
- Saraca
- Saragossa
- Sarbanissa
- Sarbissa
- Sarcopolia
- Sarcopteron
- Sarmatia
- Saroba
- Sarobela
- Sarobides
- Saroptila
- Sarothroceras
- Sartha
- Sarthida
- Sarunga
- Saserna
- Sasunaga
- Satrapodes
- Savara
- Savoca
- Scambina
- Scedopla
- Scelescepon
- Scelilasia
- Schachowskoya
- Schalidomitra
- Schalifrontia
- Schausia
- Schausilla
- Schawagrotis
- Schazama
- Schinia
- Schiraces
- Schistorhynx
- Schoyenia
- Schrankia
- Sciatta
- Sciomesa
- Scioptila
- Sclereuxoa
- Sclerogenia
- Scodionyx
- Scoedisa
- Scolecocampa
- Scoliopteryx
- Scopariopsis
- Scopelopus
- Scopifera
- Scotia
- Scotocampa
- Scotochrosta
- Scotogramma
- Scotostena
- Scriptania
- Scriptoplusia
- Scrobigera
- Sculptifrontia
- Scutirodes
- Scythobrya
- Scythocentropus
- Sedina
- Segetia
- Seirocastnia
- Selambina
- Selenisa
- Selenistis
- Selenoperas
- Selicanis
- Semiophora
- Semiothisops
- Seneratia
- Senta
- Septis
- Sergiusia
- Seria
- Sericaglaea
- Sericia
- Serpmyxis
- Serrodes
- Serryvania
- Sesamia
- Setagrotis
- Setida
- Seudyra
- Sexserrata
- Shapis
- Shensiplusia
- Shiraia
- Siavana
- Siccyna
- Sidemia
- Sideridis
- Sigela
- Sigmuncus
- Silacida
- Silda
- Sillignea
- Simplicala
- Simplicia
- Simplitype
- Simyra
- Sinarella
- Sinariola
- Sineugraphe
- Singara
- Sinipolia
- Sinocharis
- Sinognorisma
- Sinosia
- Sinotibetana
- Sinupistis
- Sipatosia
- Sirioba
- Sisputa
- Sisyrhypena
- Sitophora
- Smicroloba
- Smyra
- Solgaitiana
- Soloe
- Soloella
- Somalibrya
- Sophaga
- Sophta
- Sorygaza
- Sosxetra
- Sotigena
- Spaelotis
- Spargaloma
- Sparkia
- Spartiniphaga
- Spectronissa
- Spectrophysa
- Speia
- Speiredonia
- Speocropia
- Spersara
- Sphetta
- Sphida
- Sphingomorpha
- Sphragifera
- Spilobotys
- Spiloloma
- Spinagrotis
- Spinipalpa
- Spirama
- Spiramater
- Spodoptera
- Spragueia
- Spudaea
- Squamipalpis
- Stadna
- Staga
- Standfussiana
- Standfussrhyacia
- Staurophora
- Stauropides
- Steganiodes
- Steiria
- Stellagyris
- Stellidia
- Stemmaphora
- Stemonoceras
- Stenagrotis
- Stenbergmania
- Stenhypena
- Stenocarsia
- Stenocodia
- Stenocryptis
- Stenodrina
- Stenoecia
- Stenograpta
- Stenoloba
- Stenopaltis
- Stenopis
- Stenoprora
- Stenopterygia
- Stenorache
- Stenosomides
- Stenosticta
- Stenostigma
- Stenostygia
- Stenoxia
- Stenozethes
- Stibadium
- Stibaena
- Stibaera
- Stictigramma
- Stictoptera
- Stigmoplusia
- Stilbia
- Stilbina
- Stilbotis
- Stimmia
- Stiria
- Stiriodes
- Stomafrontia
- Stonychota
- Storthoptera
- Strabea
- Strathocles
- Strepselydna
- Strepsimanes
- Stretchia
- Striagrotis
- Striaptera
- Stridova
- Strigania
- Strigina
- Strigiphlebia
- Strongylosia
- Stygiathetis
- Stygiodrina
- Stygionyx
- Stygiostola
- Stylopoda
- Stylorache
- Subacronicta
- Subanua
- Subleuconycta
- Subnoctua
- Subsimplicia
- Subthalpa
- Sudariophora
- Sugia
- Sugitania
- Suma
- Sundwarda
- Sunira
- Supersypnoides
- Supralathosea
- Sutyna
- Swinhoea
- Syagrana
- Sydiva
- Syfania
- Syfanoidea
- Syllectra
- Symmolpis
- Sympis
- Sympistis
- Sympistoides
- Symplusia
- Synalamis
- Synalissa
- Synanomogyna
- Syncalama
- Synclerostola
- Synedoida
- Syngatha
- Syngrapha
- Synolulis
- Synomera
- Synorthodes
- Synthaca
- Syntheta
- Synthymia
- Synvaleria
- Synyrias
- Sypna
- Sypnoides
- Syrnia
- Syrrusis
- Syrrusoides
- Systaticospora
- Systremma
