= Stiriodes =

Scientific classification
- Kingdom: Animalia
- Phylum: Arthropoda
- Class: Insecta
- Order: Lepidoptera
- Superfamily: Noctuoidea
- Family: Noctuidae
- Genus: Stiriodes; Hampson, 1908

Genus of moths

Stiriodes is a genus of moths of the family Noctuidae.

== Species ==
- Stiriodes demo (Druce, 1889)

== Former species ==
- Stiriodes edentata is now Azenia edentata (Grote, 1883)
- Stiriodes obtusa is now Azenia obtusa (Herrich-Schäffer, 1854)
- Stiriodes perflava is now Azenia perflava (Harvey, 1875)
- Stiriodes virida is now Azenia virida (Barnes & McDunnough, 1916)
