= Cynisca (disambiguation) =

Cynisca was the first woman to win at the ancient Olympic Games.

Cynisca may also refer to:

- Cynisca (horse), a Thoroughbred mare racehorse
- Cynisca (lizard), a genus of lizards in the family Amphisbaenidae
- Cynisca (moth), a synonym of the moth genus Siccyna in the family Erebidae
- Cynisca Cycling, a women's road cycling team
