= Scopifera antorides =

Scientific classification
- Domain: Eukaryota
- Kingdom: Animalia
- Phylum: Arthropoda
- Class: Insecta
- Order: Lepidoptera
- Superfamily: Noctuoidea
- Family: Erebidae
- Genus: Scopifera
- Species: S. antorides

Binomial name
- Scopifera antorides (H. Druce, 1891)

Synonyms
- Mastigophorus antorides H. Druce, 1891; Mastigophorus pandes Schaus, 1906

Species of moth

Scopifera antorides is a species of moth in the family Erebidae. It was described by Herbert Druce in 1891. It is found in Guatemala, Costa Rica and in Mexico in Durango and Xalapa.

The forewings are dark brown, crossed from the costal to the inner margin by three waved brown lines. There is a minute dot in the cell and a short pale yellowish-brown streak at the end of it. The hindwings are uniform dark brown, crossed below the middle by two fainter brown lines.
