= Stenhypena adustalis =

Scientific classification
- Kingdom: Animalia
- Phylum: Arthropoda
- Class: Insecta
- Order: Lepidoptera
- Superfamily: Noctuoidea
- Family: Erebidae
- Genus: Stenhypena
- Species: S. adustalis

Binomial name
- Stenhypena adustalis (Hampson, 1893)

Synonyms
- Stenhypena adustalis (Hampson, 1893); Hypena adustalis Hampson, 1893; Hypena adustalis f. formosana Strand, 1917; Stenhypena adustalis f. formosana Strand, 1919

Species of moth

Stenhypena adustalis is a moth of the family Erebidae first described by George Hampson in 1893. It is found in Sri Lanka.
