= Calophasidia dichroa =

Scientific classification
- Kingdom: Animalia
- Phylum: Arthropoda
- Clade: Pancrustacea
- Class: Insecta
- Order: Lepidoptera
- Superfamily: Noctuoidea
- Family: Noctuidae
- Genus: Calophasidia
- Species: C. dichroa

Binomial name
- Calophasidia dichroa (Hampson, 1926)

Synonyms
- Chelaprora dichroa Hampson, G.F. 1926

Species of moth

Calophasidia dichroa is a moth in the family Noctuidae. It is endemic to the Northern Territory, Queensland and Western Australia.
