= Azenia implora =

Scientific classification
- Kingdom: Animalia
- Phylum: Arthropoda
- Class: Insecta
- Order: Lepidoptera
- Superfamily: Noctuoidea
- Family: Noctuidae
- Genus: Azenia
- Species: A. implora

Binomial name
- Azenia implora Grote, 1883

Species of moth

Azenia implora is a species of moth in the family Noctuidae (the owlet moths). It is found in North America. It was discovered in 1883 and can be found in California, Arizona, and New Mexico.

The MONA or Hodges number for Azenia implora is 9729.
