= Calophasidia lucala =

Scientific classification
- Kingdom: Animalia
- Phylum: Arthropoda
- Clade: Pancrustacea
- Class: Insecta
- Order: Lepidoptera
- Superfamily: Noctuoidea
- Family: Noctuidae
- Genus: Calophasidia
- Species: C. lucala

Binomial name
- Calophasidia lucala (Swinhoe, 1902)

Synonyms
- Megalodes lucala Swinhoe, C. 1902

Species of moth

Calophasidia lucala is a moth in the family Noctuidae. It is endemic to Western Australia.

The wingspan is about 38 mm (1.5 in).
