= Sphetta apicalis =

Scientific classification
- Kingdom: Animalia
- Phylum: Arthropoda
- Clade: Pancrustacea
- Class: Insecta
- Order: Lepidoptera
- Superfamily: Noctuoidea
- Family: Noctuidae
- Genus: Sphetta
- Species: S. apicalis

Binomial name
- Sphetta apicalis Walker, 1865

Species of moth

Sphetta apicalis is a moth of the family Notodontidae first described by Francis Walker in 1865. It is found in Sri Lanka.

Host plants of the caterpillar include Pongamia, Derris, Sapindus, Diospyros and Nephelium species.
