= Calophasidia radiata =

Scientific classification
- Kingdom: Animalia
- Phylum: Arthropoda
- Clade: Pancrustacea
- Class: Insecta
- Order: Lepidoptera
- Superfamily: Noctuoidea
- Family: Noctuidae
- Genus: Calophasidia
- Species: C. radiata

Binomial name
- Calophasidia radiata (Swinhoe, 1902)

Synonyms
- Megalodes radiata Swinhoe, C. 1902

Species of moth

Calophasidia radiata is a moth in the family Noctuidae. It is endemic to Western Australia.

Its wingspan is about 33 mm (1.3 in).
