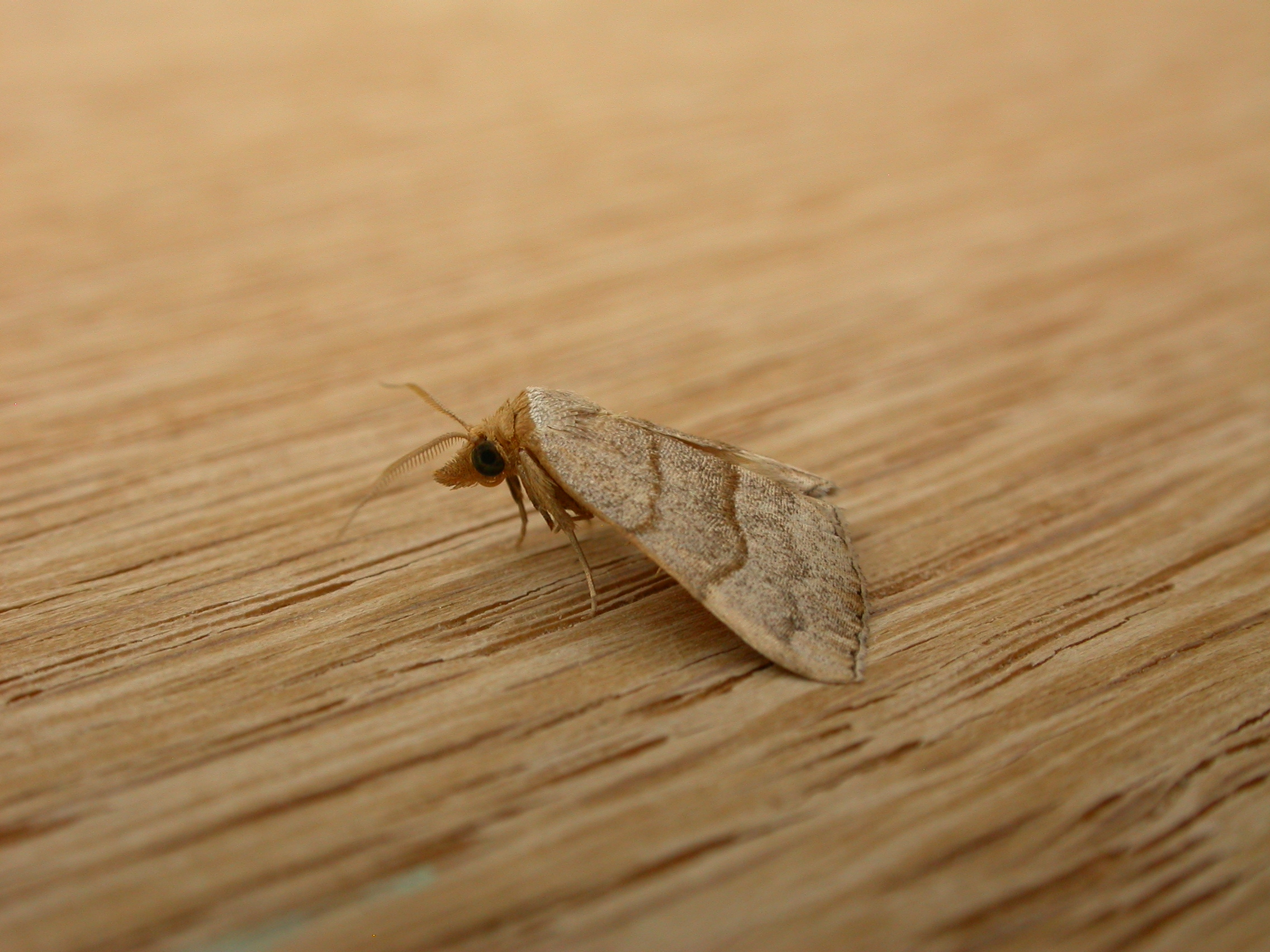

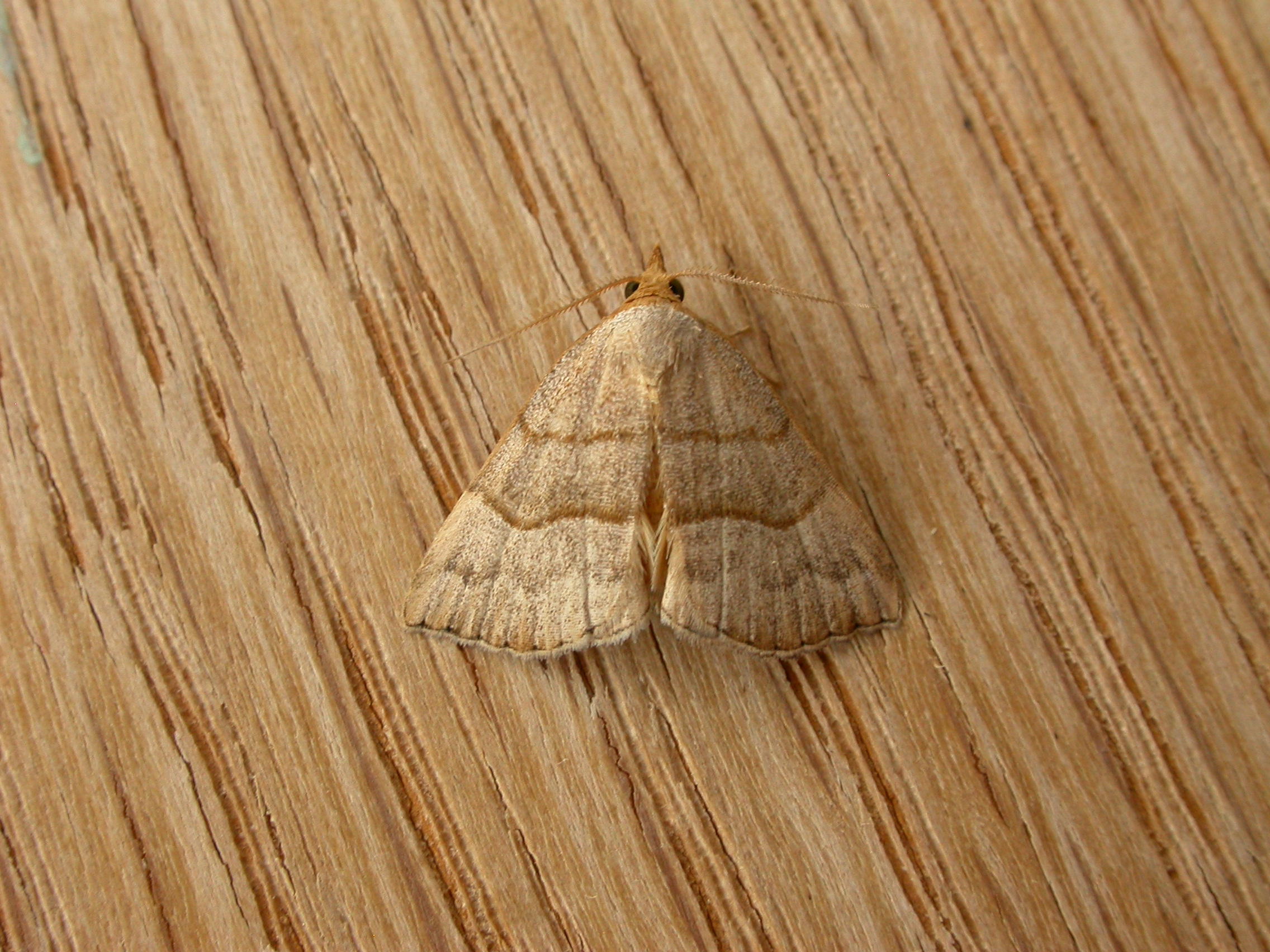

Scientific classification
- Kingdom: Animalia
- Phylum: Arthropoda
- Clade: Pancrustacea
- Class: Insecta
- Order: Lepidoptera
- Superfamily: Noctuoidea
- Family: Erebidae
- Genus: Meranda
- Species: M. susialis

Binomial name
- Meranda susialis (Walker, 1859)

Synonyms
- Pionea susialis Walker, 1859; Panagra extentata Walker, 1861; Camptogramma infirmata Walker, 1862; Meranda latalis Walker, 1866

= Meranda susialis =

Species of moth

Meranda susialis is a moth of the family Noctuidae first described by Francis Walker in 1859. It is known from Australia.
