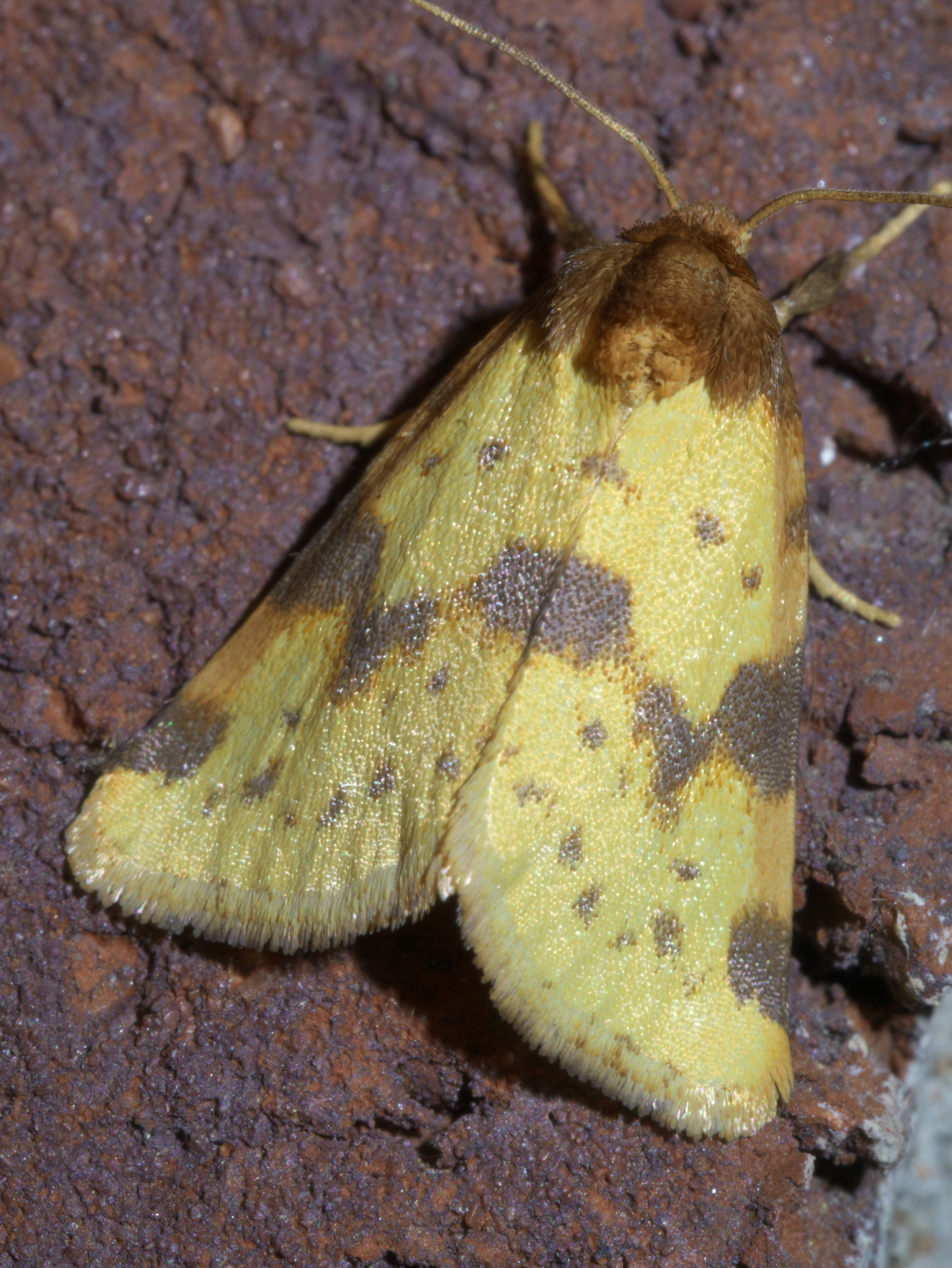
- Azenia obtusa

Scientific classification
- Kingdom: Animalia
- Phylum: Arthropoda
- Clade: Pancrustacea
- Class: Insecta
- Order: Lepidoptera
- Superfamily: Noctuoidea
- Family: Noctuidae
- Subfamily: Metoponiinae
- Genus: Azenia; Grote, 1883

= Azenia =

Genus of moths

Azenia is a genus of moths of the family Noctuidae.

== Species ==
- Azenia edentata (Grote, 1883)
- Azenia implora Grote, 1883
- Azenia obtusa (Herrich-Schäffer, 1854)
- Azenia perflava (Harvey, 1875)
- Azenia procida (Druce, 1889) (=Azenia nepotica (Dyar, 1912))
- Azenia templetonae Clarke, 1937
- Azenia virida (Barnes & McDunnough, 1916)
