= Mecodina umbrosa =

Scientific classification
- Kingdom: Animalia
- Phylum: Arthropoda
- Clade: Pancrustacea
- Class: Insecta
- Order: Lepidoptera
- Superfamily: Noctuoidea
- Family: Erebidae
- Genus: Mecodina
- Species: M. umbrosa

Binomial name
- Mecodina umbrosa (Hampson, 1893)

Synonyms
- Araeognatha umbrosa Hampson, 1893

Species of moth

Mecodina umbrosa is a moth of the family Noctuidae first described by George Hampson in 1893. It is found in Sri Lanka.
