= Sugia stygia =

Scientific classification
- Domain: Eukaryota
- Kingdom: Animalia
- Phylum: Arthropoda
- Class: Insecta
- Order: Lepidoptera
- Superfamily: Noctuoidea
- Family: Noctuidae
- Genus: Sugia
- Species: S. stygia

Binomial name
- Sugia stygia Butler, 1878

Species of moth

Sugia stygia is a moth of the family Noctuidae first described by Arthur Gardiner Butler in 1878. It is found in Japan, Korea, India, Sri Lanka, Taiwan and China.

Adult wingspan is 21–27 mm. A white streak near the wings' trailing edge is shaped roughly like the digit "3".
