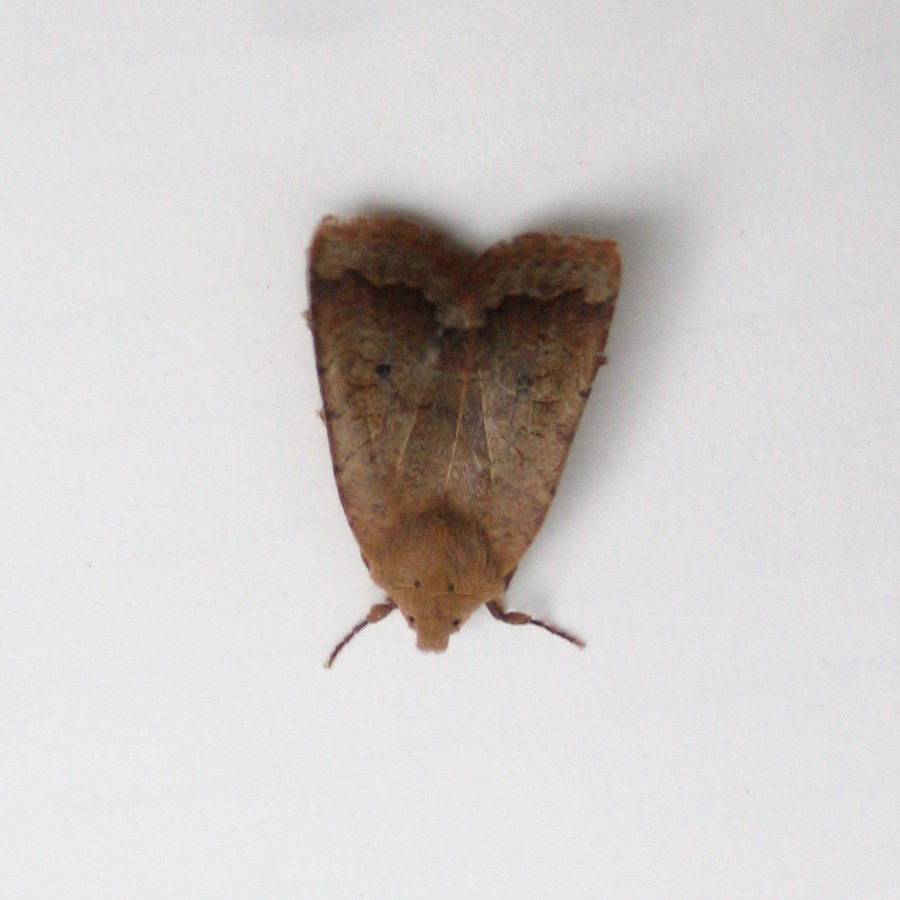

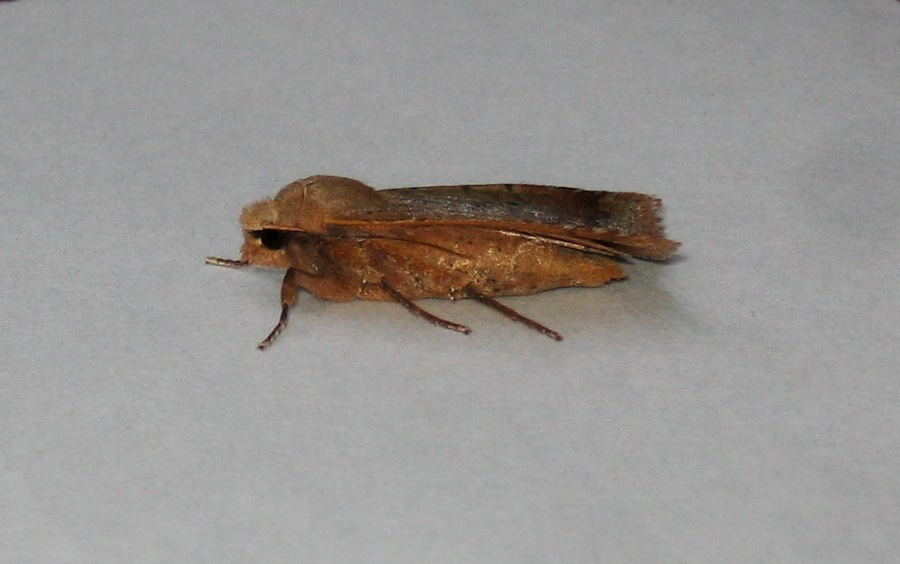

Scientific classification
- Kingdom: Animalia
- Phylum: Arthropoda
- Clade: Pancrustacea
- Class: Insecta
- Order: Lepidoptera
- Superfamily: Noctuoidea
- Family: Noctuidae
- Genus: Sericaglaea
- Species: S. signata

Binomial name
- Sericaglaea signata (French, 1879)

Synonyms
- Orhtosia signata French, 1879

= Sericaglaea signata =

Species of moth

The variable sallow moth (Sericaglaea signata) is a moth of the family Noctuidae. It is found from Connecticut to Florida and west to Missouri and Texas.

The wingspan is 35–43 mm. They are on wing from October to May in one generation per year. The adults overwinter.

The larvae feed on the leaves of Quercus, Prunus and Tilia species.
