= Syrrusis pictura =

Scientific classification
- Kingdom: Animalia
- Phylum: Arthropoda
- Clade: Pancrustacea
- Class: Insecta
- Order: Lepidoptera
- Superfamily: Noctuoidea
- Family: Noctuidae
- Genus: Syrrusis
- Species: S. pictura

Binomial name
- Syrrusis pictura (Saalmüller, 1891)

Synonyms
- Timaea pictura Saalmüller, 1891

Species of moth

Syrrusis pictura is a moth of the family Noctuidae. It is found in Madagascar.

The wingspan of the adult moths is 30 mm.
