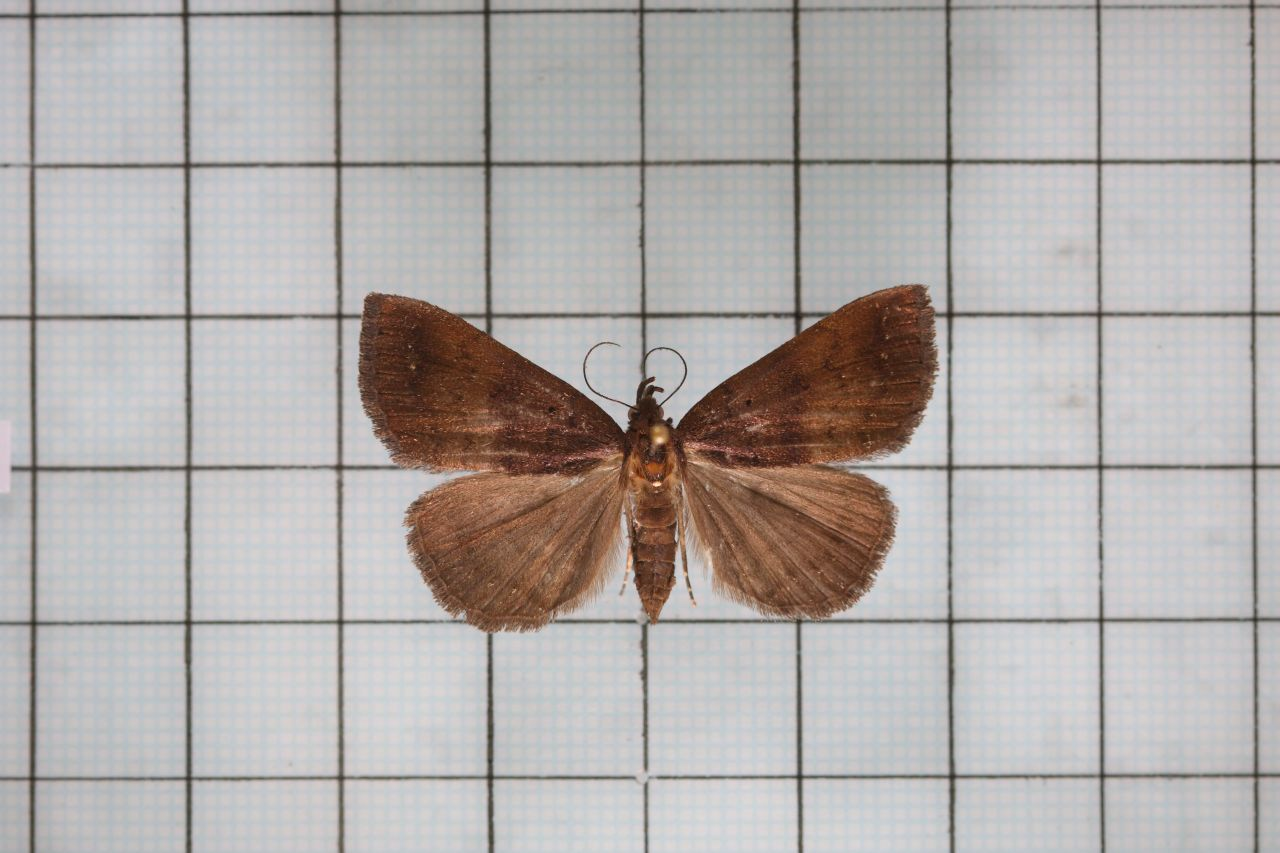

Scientific classification
- Domain: Eukaryota
- Kingdom: Animalia
- Phylum: Arthropoda
- Class: Insecta
- Order: Lepidoptera
- Superfamily: Noctuoidea
- Family: Erebidae
- Genus: Squamipalpis
- Species: S. subnubila

Binomial name
- Squamipalpis subnubila (Leech, 1900)

Synonyms
- Herminia subnubila Leech, 1900; Nodaria subnubila

= Squamipalpis subnubila =

Species of moth

Squamipalpis subnubila is a species of moth of the family Noctuidae first described by John Henry Leech in 1900. It is found in Taiwan.
