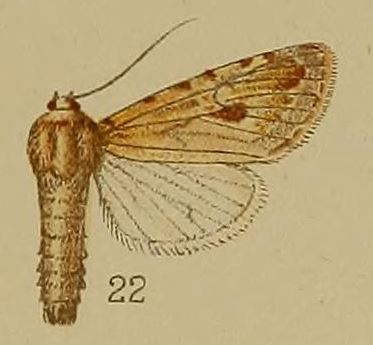

Scientific classification
- Kingdom: Animalia
- Phylum: Arthropoda
- Clade: Pancrustacea
- Class: Insecta
- Order: Lepidoptera
- Superfamily: Noctuoidea
- Family: Noctuidae
- Genus: Scythocentropus
- Species: S. scripturosa

Binomial name
- Scythocentropus scripturosa (Eversmann, 1854)

Synonyms
- Xylina scripturosa Eversmann, 1854; Scythocentropus scriturosa; Lycophotia poliades Hampson, 1907; Scythocentropus scripturosus (Eversmann 1854)

= Scythocentropus scripturosa =

Species of moth

Scythocentropus scripturosa is a moth of the family Noctuidae. It is found in Pakistan, Turkmenistan, southern Russia and Kazakhstan.
