= Sinarella discisigna =

Scientific classification
- Domain: Eukaryota
- Kingdom: Animalia
- Phylum: Arthropoda
- Class: Insecta
- Order: Lepidoptera
- Superfamily: Noctuoidea
- Family: Erebidae
- Genus: Sinarella
- Species: S. discisigna

Binomial name
- Sinarella discisigna (Moore, 1883)

Synonyms
- Leucinodes discisigna Moore, 1883; Nodaria discisigna Moore, 1883

Species of moth

Sinarella discisigna (sometimes as Nodaria discisigna), is a moth of the family Erebidae first described by Frederic Moore in 1883. It is found in Sri Lanka, India, Nepal and Thailand.
