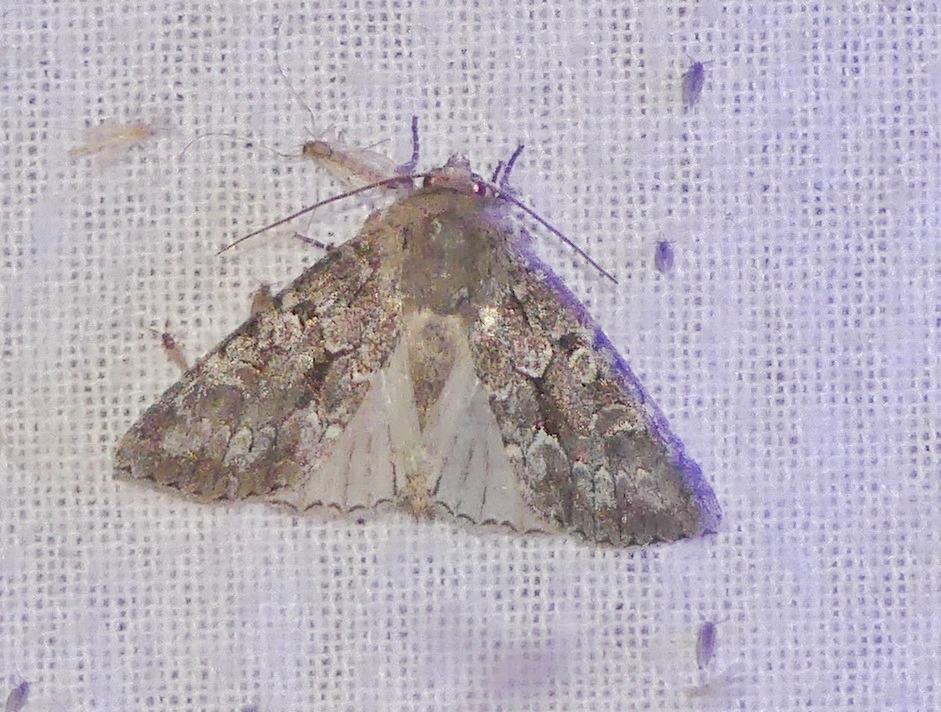

Scientific classification
- Kingdom: Animalia
- Phylum: Arthropoda
- Class: Insecta
- Order: Lepidoptera
- Superfamily: Noctuoidea
- Family: Noctuidae
- Tribe: Xylenini
- Subtribe: Antitypina
- Genus: Sutyna
- Species: S. privata

Binomial name
- Sutyna privata (Walker, 1857)

Synonyms
- Sutyna profundus (Smith, 1900); Sutyna tenuilinea (Smith, 1903)

= Sutyna privata =

Species of moth

Sutyna privata, the private sallow moth, is a species of cutworm or dart moth in the family Noctuidae. It is found in North America.
