= Stenopterygia subcurva =

Scientific classification
- Kingdom: Animalia
- Phylum: Arthropoda
- Class: Insecta
- Order: Lepidoptera
- Superfamily: Noctuoidea
- Family: Noctuidae
- Genus: Stenopterygia
- Species: S. subcurva

Binomial name
- Stenopterygia subcurva (Walker, 1857)

Synonyms
- Hadena subcurva Walker, 1857; Hadena postica Walker, 1857; Dipterygia sikkima Moore, 1882

Species of moth

Stenopterygia subcurva is a moth of the family Noctuidae first described by Francis Walker in 1857. It is found in Sri Lanka.

The male has basal trifine hair-pencils. Forewings with brown facies. Caterpillar blackish with orange-red head. Lateral orange patch found on T1. Setae based on a white dot. Caterpillar usually rests on underside of a leaf. Pupation occurs in a tough oval white silken cocoon covered with earth particles within the soil.

Larval host plant is Ochna.
