= Calophasidia dentifera =

Scientific classification
- Kingdom: Animalia
- Phylum: Arthropoda
- Class: Insecta
- Order: Lepidoptera
- Superfamily: Noctuoidea
- Family: Noctuidae
- Genus: Calophasidia
- Species: C. dentifera

Binomial name
- Calophasidia dentifera Hampson, 1909

Species of moth

Calophasidia dentifera is a moth in the family Noctuidae. It is endemic to Western Australia.
