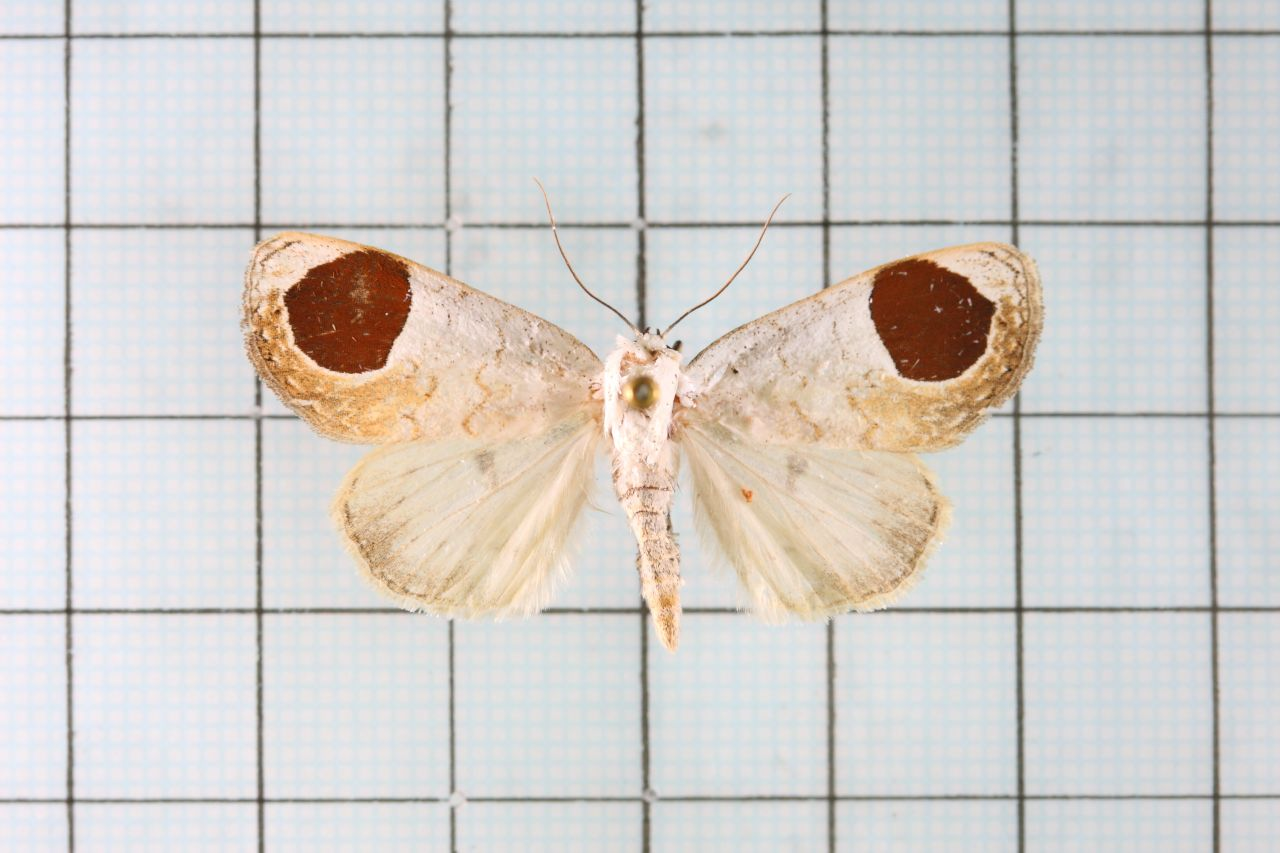
- Sphragifera sigillata taimacula

Scientific classification
- Domain: Eukaryota
- Kingdom: Animalia
- Phylum: Arthropoda
- Class: Insecta
- Order: Lepidoptera
- Superfamily: Noctuoidea
- Family: Noctuidae
- Genus: Sphragifera
- Species: S. sigillata

Binomial name
- Sphragifera sigillata (Menetries, 1859)

Synonyms
- Anthoecia sigillata Menetries, 1859

= Sphragifera sigillata =

Species of moth

Sphragifera sigillata is a species of moth of the family Noctuidae. It is found in Asia, including the Russian Far East, Japan and Taiwan.

The wingspan is 32–40 mm.

== Subspecies ==
- Sphragifera sigillata sigillata
- Sphragifera sigillata taimacula Hreblay & Ronkay, 2000 (Taiwan)
