= Azenia procida =

Scientific classification
- Kingdom: Animalia
- Phylum: Arthropoda
- Clade: Pancrustacea
- Class: Insecta
- Order: Lepidoptera
- Superfamily: Noctuoidea
- Family: Noctuidae
- Genus: Azenia
- Species: A. procida

Binomial name
- Azenia procida (H. Druce, 1889)

Synonyms
- Azenia nepotica (Dyar, 1912)

Species of moth

Azenia procida is a moth in the family Noctuidae (the owlet moths) described by Herbert Druce in 1889. It is found in North America.

The MONA or Hodges number for Azenia procida is 9726.1.
