= Calophasidia latens =

Scientific classification
- Domain: Eukaryota
- Kingdom: Animalia
- Phylum: Arthropoda
- Class: Insecta
- Order: Lepidoptera
- Superfamily: Noctuoidea
- Family: Noctuidae
- Genus: Calophasidia
- Species: C. latens

Binomial name
- Calophasidia latens (Turner, 1929)

Synonyms
- Prorocopis latens Turner, A.J. 1929; Stonychota angustula Turner, A.J. 1941

Species of moth

Calophasidia latens is a moth in the family Noctuidae. It is endemic to New South Wales, the Northern Territory, Queensland and South Australia.
