= Synorthodes typhedana =

Scientific classification
- Domain: Eukaryota
- Kingdom: Animalia
- Phylum: Arthropoda
- Class: Insecta
- Order: Lepidoptera
- Superfamily: Noctuoidea
- Family: Noctuidae
- Tribe: Eriopygini
- Genus: Synorthodes
- Species: S. typhedana

Binomial name
- Synorthodes typhedana Franclemont, 1976

Species of moth

Synorthodes typhedana is a species of cutworm or dart moth in the family Noctuidae. It is found in North America.

The MONA or Hodges number for Synorthodes typhedana is 10591.
