= Synorthodes auriginea =

Scientific classification
- Kingdom: Animalia
- Phylum: Arthropoda
- Clade: Pancrustacea
- Class: Insecta
- Order: Lepidoptera
- Superfamily: Noctuoidea
- Family: Noctuidae
- Tribe: Eriopygini
- Genus: Synorthodes
- Species: S. auriginea

Binomial name
- Synorthodes auriginea Franclemont, 1976

Species of moth

Synorthodes auriginea is a species of cutworm or dart moth in the family Noctuidae. It is found in North America.
