= Calophasidia cana =

Scientific classification
- Domain: Eukaryota
- Kingdom: Animalia
- Phylum: Arthropoda
- Class: Insecta
- Order: Lepidoptera
- Superfamily: Noctuoidea
- Family: Noctuidae
- Genus: Calophasidia
- Species: C. cana

Binomial name
- Calophasidia cana (Turner, 1939)

Synonyms
- Alophosoma cana Turner, A.J. 1939

Species of moth

Calophasidia cana is a moth in the family Noctuidae. It is endemic to the Northern Territory, Queensland and Western Australia.
