= Scythocentropus inquinata =

Scientific classification
- Domain: Eukaryota
- Kingdom: Animalia
- Phylum: Arthropoda
- Class: Insecta
- Order: Lepidoptera
- Superfamily: Noctuoidea
- Family: Noctuidae
- Genus: Scythocentropus
- Species: S. inquinata

Binomial name
- Scythocentropus inquinata (Mabille, [1888])

Synonyms
- Hadena inquinata Mabille, 1888; Scythocentropus ferrantei Draudt, 1911; Scythocentropus mercedes Pinker, [1974]

Species of moth

Scythocentropus inquinata is a moth of the family Noctuidae. It was described by Jules Paul Mabille in 1888. It is found in Tunisia and Egypt, as well as on the Canary Islands and Malta.
