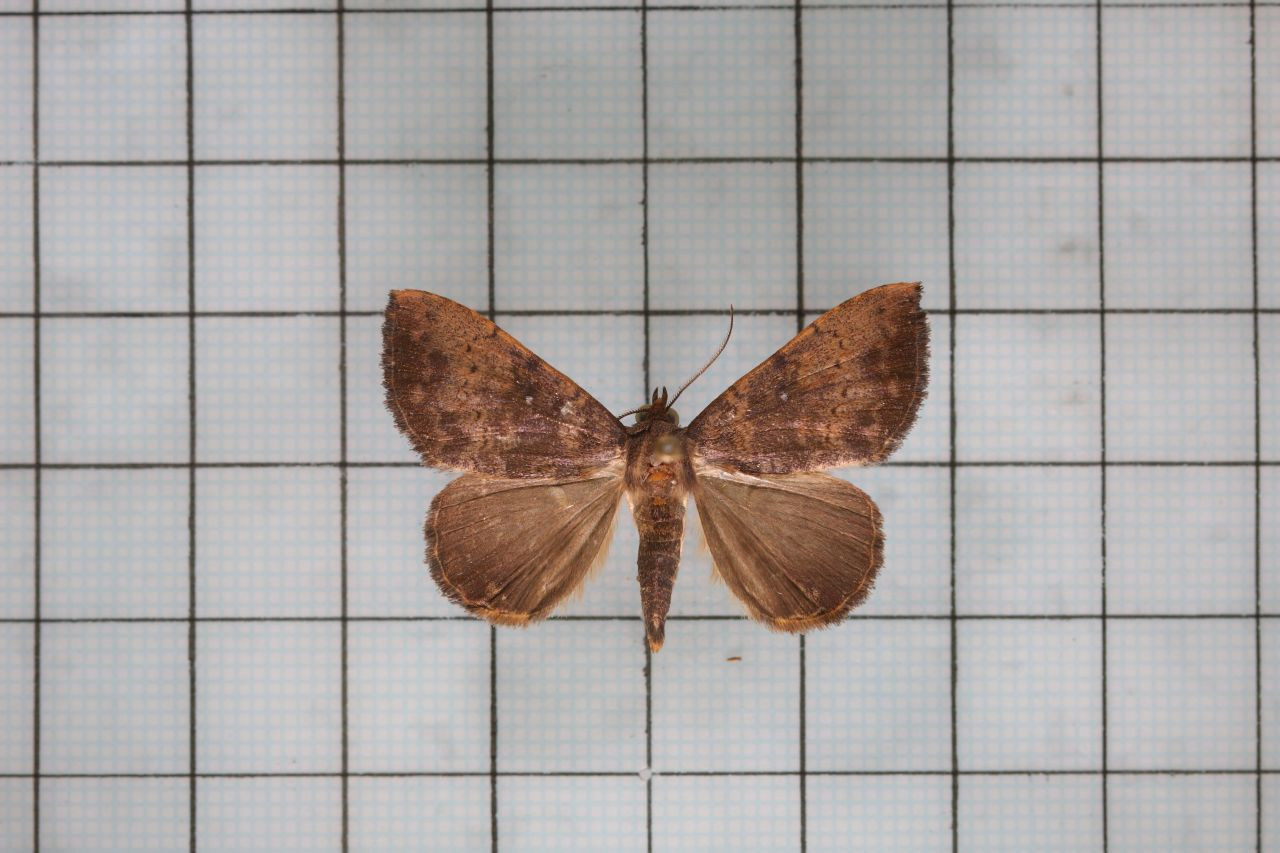

Scientific classification
- Domain: Eukaryota
- Kingdom: Animalia
- Phylum: Arthropoda
- Class: Insecta
- Order: Lepidoptera
- Superfamily: Noctuoidea
- Family: Erebidae
- Genus: Scedopla
- Species: S. umbrosa

Binomial name
- Scedopla umbrosa (Wileman, 1916)

Synonyms
- Oglasa umbrosa Wileman, 1916

= Scedopla umbrosa =

Species of moth

Scedopla umbrosa is a species of moth of the family Erebidae first described by Wileman in 1916. It is found in Taiwan.
