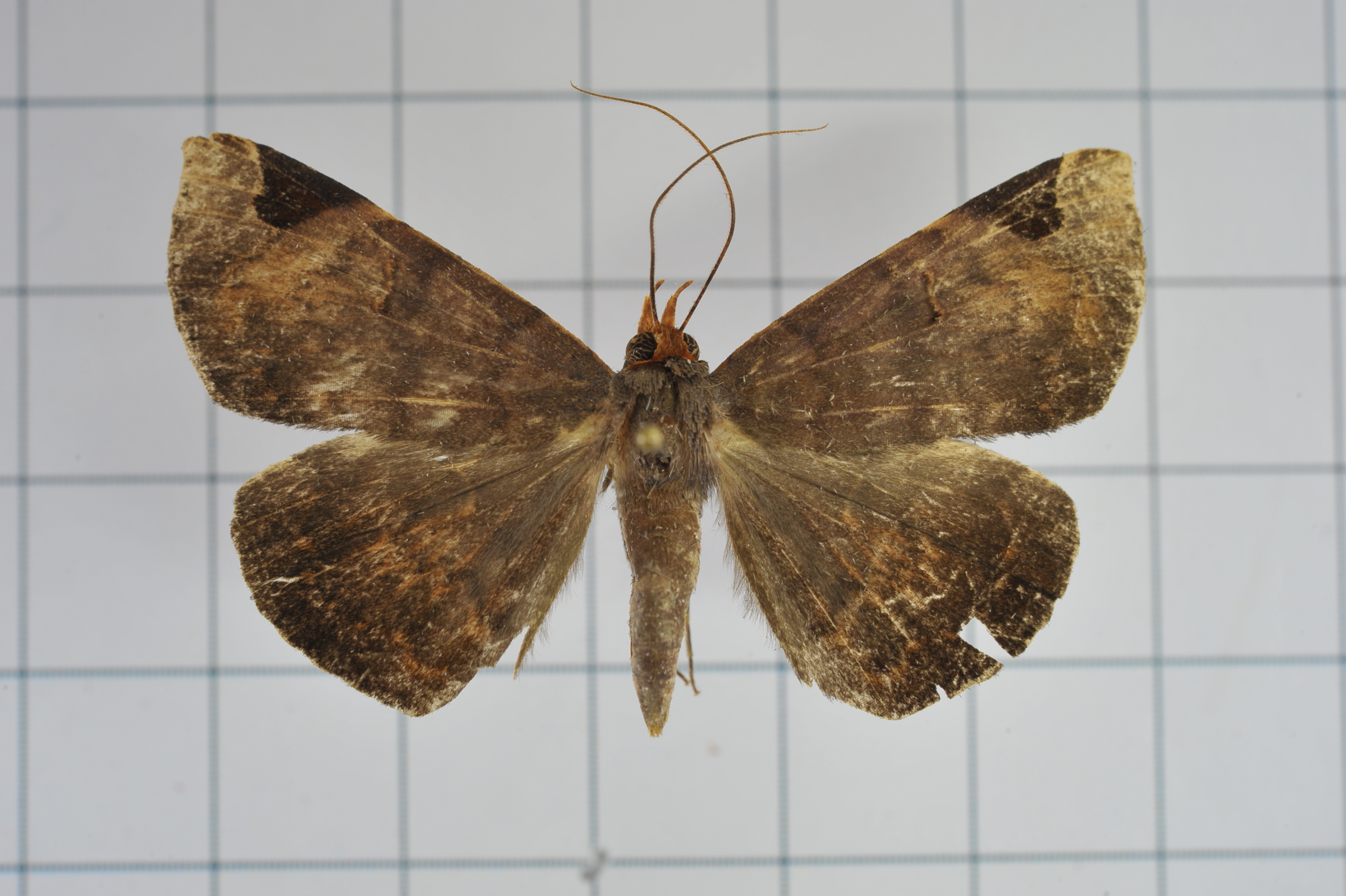
- Mecodina praecipua

Scientific classification
- Kingdom: Animalia
- Phylum: Arthropoda
- Clade: Pancrustacea
- Class: Insecta
- Order: Lepidoptera
- Superfamily: Noctuoidea
- Family: Erebidae
- Genus: Mecodina
- Species: M. praecipua

Binomial name
- Mecodina praecipua (Walker, 1865)

Synonyms
- Thermesia praecipua Walker, 1865; Marmorinia nara Felder, 1874; Capnodes macrocera amboinica Pagenstecher, 1884

= Mecodina praecipua =

Species of moth

Mecodina praecipua is a moth of the family Noctuidae first described by Francis Walker in 1865.

== Distribution ==
It is found in the Indian subregion, Sri Lanka, New Guinea, Hong Kong, Taiwan, Queensland in Australia, Japan and the Bismarck Islands.
