= Saccharophagos =

Scientific classification
- Domain: Eukaryota
- Kingdom: Animalia
- Phylum: Arthropoda
- Class: Insecta
- Order: Lepidoptera
- Superfamily: Noctuoidea
- Family: Erebidae
- Subfamily: Calpinae
- Genus: Saccharophagos; Schaus, 1923
- Species: S. mochisa

Binomial name
- Saccharophagos mochisa (Schaus, 1923)

Synonyms
- Sacchariphagos mochisa Schaus, 1923

Genus of moths

Saccharophagos is a monotypic moth genus of the family Erebidae. Its only species, Saccharophagos mochisa, is found in Mexico. Both the genus and species were first described by William Schaus in 1923.
