= Stadna =

Scientific classification
- Domain: Eukaryota
- Kingdom: Animalia
- Phylum: Arthropoda
- Class: Insecta
- Order: Lepidoptera
- Superfamily: Noctuoidea
- Family: Erebidae
- Subfamily: Herminiinae
- Genus: Stadna; C. Swinhoe, 1900
- Species: S. metaspilata

Binomial name
- Stadna metaspilata (Walker, 1866)

Synonyms
- Eupithecia metaspilata Walker, 1866; Stadna nigriplaga C. Swinhoe, 1900; Modunga metaspilata

Genus of moths

Stadna is a monotypic moth genus of the family Erebidae erected by Charles Swinhoe in 1900. Its only species, Stadna metaspilata, was first described by Francis Walker in 1866. It is found in Borneo.
