= Scotia (moth) =

Scientific classification
- Kingdom: Animalia
- Phylum: Arthropoda
- Clade: Pancrustacea
- Class: Insecta
- Order: Lepidoptera
- Superfamily: Noctuoidea
- Family: Noctuidae
- Genus: Scotia; Hübner, 1821

Genus of moths

Scotia is a genus of moths of the family Noctuidae.
