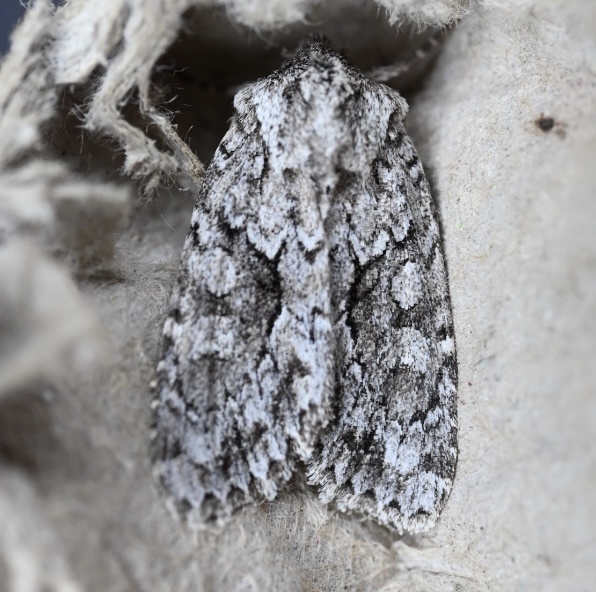
- Sutyna privata

Scientific classification
- Kingdom: Animalia
- Phylum: Arthropoda
- Class: Insecta
- Order: Lepidoptera
- Superfamily: Noctuoidea
- Family: Noctuidae
- Subtribe: Antitypina
- Genus: Sutyna; Todd, 1958

Synonyms
- Anytus Grote, 1873; Amytus Grünberg, 1910

= Sutyna =

Genus of moths

Sutyna is a genus of moths of the family Noctuidae.

== Species ==
- Sutyna colombiensis (Dognin, 1914)
- Sutyna negrita (Hampson, 1907)
- Sutyna privata (Walker, 1857) (syn: Sutyna profundus (Smith, 1900), Sutyna tenuilinea (Smith, [1904]))
- Sutyna leucocyma (Hampson, 1912)
