= Sanys =

Scientific classification
- Kingdom: Animalia
- Phylum: Arthropoda
- Class: Insecta
- Order: Lepidoptera
- Superfamily: Noctuoidea
- Family: Erebidae
- Subfamily: Calpinae
- Genus: Sanys; Guenée in Boisduval & Guenée, 1852

Genus of moths

Sanys is a genus of moths of the family Erebidae. The genus was erected by Achille Guenée in 1852.

== Species ==
- Sanys bebryx Schaus, 1904 French Guiana
- Sanys capsicata Schaus, 1901 Venezuela
- Sanys carnina Guenée, 1852 Brazil (Rio de Janeiro)
- Sanys coenotype Hampson, 1926 Peru
- Sanys corticea Hampson, 1926 Peru
- Sanys evanescens Schaus, 1901 Venezuela
- Sanys gigas Hampson, 1926 Peru
- Sanys irrosea Guenee, 1852 French Guiana
- Sanys lara (Schaus, 1894) Mexico, Peru
- Sanys leucocraspis Hampson, 1926 Peru
- Sanys prioncera Hampson, 1926 Peru
- Sanys pyrene Scahus, 1914 Suriname

== See also ==
- Self-Advocacy Association of New York State
