= Azenia edentata =

Scientific classification
- Domain: Eukaryota
- Kingdom: Animalia
- Phylum: Arthropoda
- Class: Insecta
- Order: Lepidoptera
- Superfamily: Noctuoidea
- Family: Noctuidae
- Genus: Azenia
- Species: A. edentata

Binomial name
- Azenia edentata Grote, 1883

Species of moth

Azenia edentata is a species of moth in the family Noctuidae (the owlet moths). It is found in North America.

The MONA or Hodges number for Azenia edentata is 9726.
