= Smyra =

Scientific classification
- Domain: Eukaryota
- Kingdom: Animalia
- Phylum: Arthropoda
- Class: Insecta
- Order: Lepidoptera
- Superfamily: Noctuoidea
- Family: Erebidae
- Subfamily: Calpinae
- Genus: Smyra; Möschler, 1880

Genus and species of moth

Smyra is a genus of moths of the family Erebidae. The genus was erected by Heinrich Benno Möschler in 1880.

== Species ==
- Smyra aexonia (H. Druce, 1890) Panama
- Smyra chlorolimbis Möschler, 1880 Suriname
- Smyra parvula (Walker, 1865) Brazil (Rio de Janeiro)
- Smyra stipatura (Walker, 1858) Brazil (Amazonas, Rio de Janeiro), Suriname
