= Scotostena =

Scientific classification
- Kingdom: Animalia
- Phylum: Arthropoda
- Class: Insecta
- Order: Lepidoptera
- Superfamily: Noctuoidea
- Family: Noctuidae
- Subfamily: Acontiinae
- Genus: Scotostena; Hampson, 1910
- Species: S. lugens

Binomial name
- Scotostena lugens Hampson, 1910

Genus of moths

Scotostena is a monotypic moth genus of the family Noctuidae. Its only species, Scotostena lugens, is found in New Guinea. Both the genus and species were first described by George Hampson in 1910.
