= Striaptera =

Scientific classification
- Kingdom: Animalia
- Phylum: Arthropoda
- Class: Insecta
- Order: Lepidoptera
- Superfamily: Noctuoidea
- Family: Erebidae
- Subfamily: Calpinae
- Genus: Striaptera; Hampson, 1926
- Species: S. cinnamomeus

Binomial name
- Striaptera cinnamomeus (Bethune-Baker, 1908)

Synonyms
- Camptochilus cinnamomeus Bethune-Baker, 1908

Genus of moths

Striaptera is a monotypic moth genus of the family Erebidae erected by George Hampson in 1926. Its only species, Striaptera cinnamomeus, was first described by George Thomas Bethune-Baker in 1908. It is found in New Guinea.
