= Scopifera =

Scientific classification
- Domain: Eukaryota
- Kingdom: Animalia
- Phylum: Arthropoda
- Class: Insecta
- Order: Lepidoptera
- Superfamily: Noctuoidea
- Family: Erebidae
- Subfamily: Herminiinae
- Genus: Scopifera; Herrich-Schäffer, 1870

Genus of moths

Scopifera is a genus of moths of the family Erebidae. The genus was erected by Gottlieb August Wilhelm Herrich-Schäffer in 1870.

== Species ==
- Scopifera antelia (H. Druce, 1891) Panama
- Scopifera antorides (H. Druce, 1891) Mexico
- Scopifera falsirenalis Schaus, 1916 Mexico
- Scopifera insurrecta Dyar, 1918 Mexico
- Scopifera lycagusalis (Walker, [1859]) Venezuela
- Scopifera lygdus (H. Druce, 1891) Guatemala
- Scopifera menippusalis (Walker, [1859]) Venezuela, Brazil
- Scopifera mirabilis (Butler, 1889) Jamaica
- Scopifera phrygialis Schaus, 1916 Costa Rica
- Scopifera poasalis (Schaus, 1913) Costa Rica
