= Sorygaza =

Scientific classification
- Kingdom: Animalia
- Phylum: Arthropoda
- Class: Insecta
- Order: Lepidoptera
- Superfamily: Noctuoidea
- Family: Erebidae
- Subfamily: Herminiinae
- Genus: Sorygaza; Walker, [1866]

Genus of moths

Sorygaza is a genus of moths of the family Erebidae. The genus was erected by Francis Walker in 1866.

== Species ==
- Sorygaza arbela H. Druce, 1891 Panama
- Sorygaza argandina H. Druce, 1891 Panama
- Sorygaza armasata H. Druce, 1891 Panama
- Sorygaza didymata Walker, [1866] Venezuela, Panama
- Sorygaza mardia H. Druce, 1891 Panama
- Sorygaza ramsdeni Schaus, 1916 Cuba
- Sorygaza variata Hayes, 1975 Galápagos Islands
