= Stictigramma =

Scientific classification
- Kingdom: Animalia
- Phylum: Arthropoda
- Class: Insecta
- Order: Lepidoptera
- Superfamily: Noctuoidea
- Family: Erebidae
- Subfamily: Calpinae
- Genus: Stictigramma; Hampson, 1926

Genus of moths

Stictigramma is a genus of moths of the family Erebidae. The genus was erected by George Hampson in 1926.

== Species ==
- Stictigramma kasyi Wiltshire, 1971
- Stictigramma leechi Wileman, 1915
- Stictigramma limbata Wileman, 1915
- Stictigramma lobbichleri Wiltshire, 1968
- Stictigramma steniptera Hampson, 1926 New Guinea
