= Schiraces =

Scientific classification
- Domain: Eukaryota
- Kingdom: Animalia
- Phylum: Arthropoda
- Class: Insecta
- Order: Lepidoptera
- Superfamily: Noctuoidea
- Family: Erebidae
- Subfamily: Herminiinae
- Genus: Schiraces; Schaus, 1916

Genus of moths

Schiraces is a genus of moths of the family Erebidae. The genus was described by William Schaus in 1916. Both species are found in French Guiana.

== Species ==
- Schiraces mopsus Schaus, 1916
- Schiraces mortua Schaus, 1916
