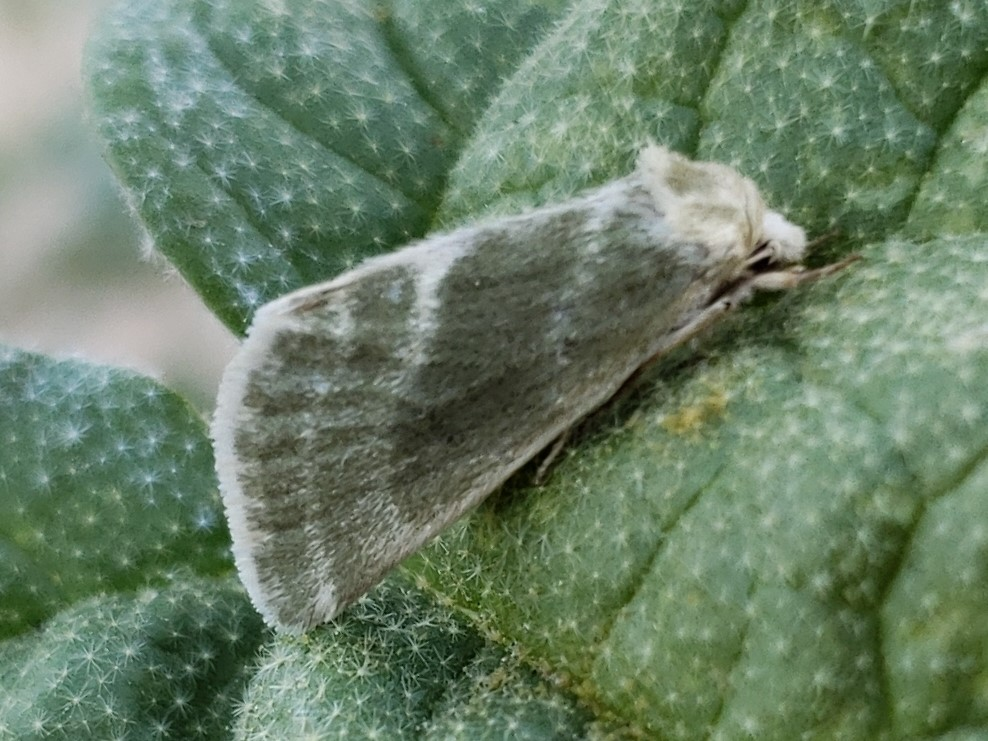

Scientific classification
- Domain: Eukaryota
- Kingdom: Animalia
- Phylum: Arthropoda
- Class: Insecta
- Order: Lepidoptera
- Superfamily: Noctuoidea
- Family: Noctuidae
- Genus: Azenia
- Species: A. virida

Binomial name
- Azenia virida Barnes & McDunnough, 1916

= Azenia virida =

Species of moth

Azenia virida is a species of moth in the family Noctuidae (the owlet moths). It was first described by William Barnes and James Halliday McDunnough in 1916 and it is found in North America.
