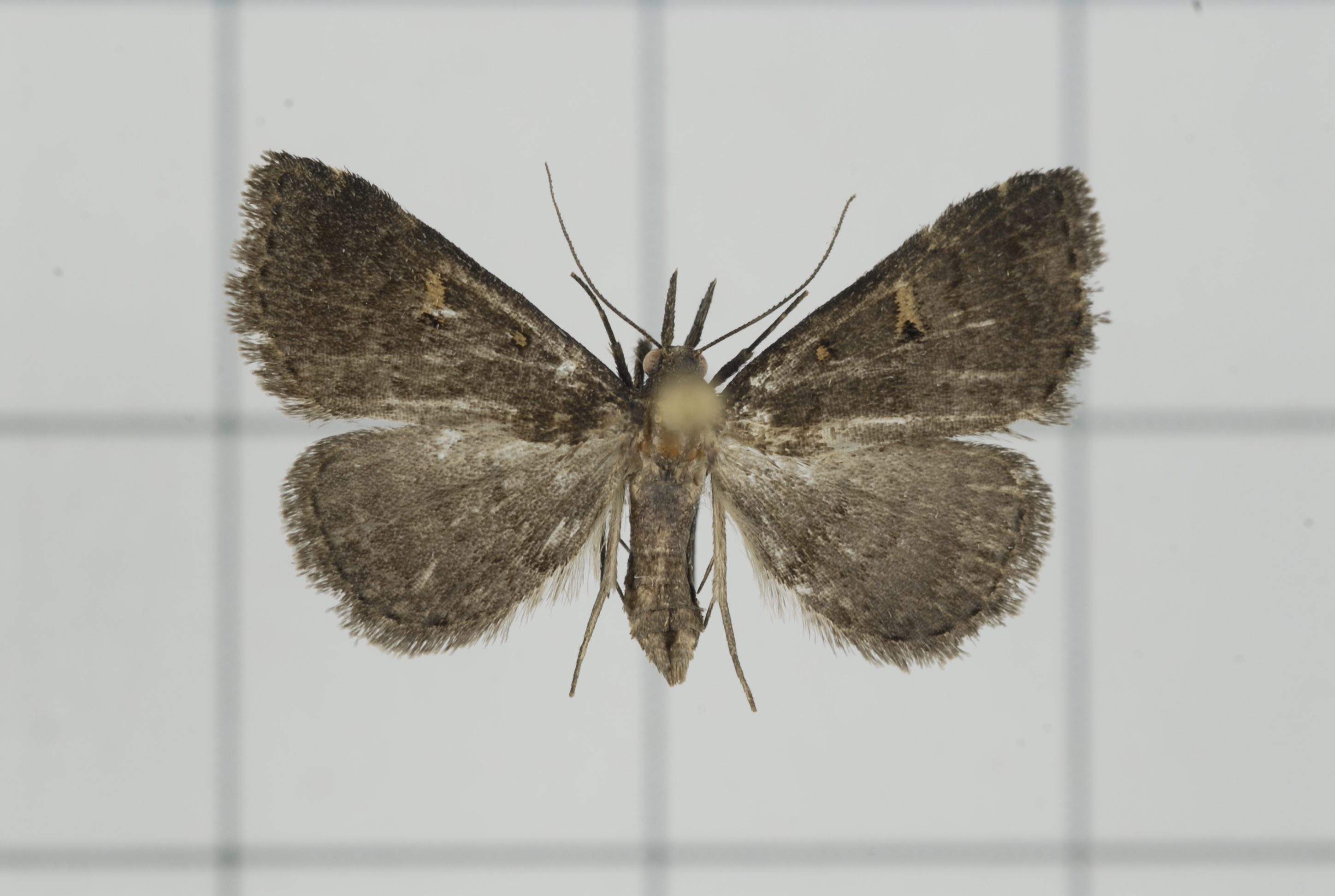

Scientific classification
- Kingdom: Animalia
- Phylum: Arthropoda
- Class: Insecta
- Order: Lepidoptera
- Superfamily: Noctuoidea
- Family: Erebidae
- Subfamily: Herminiinae
- Genus: Sinarella; Bryk, 1949

= Sinarella =

Genus of moths

Sinarella is a genus of moths of the family Erebidae. The genus was erected by Felix Bryk in 1949.

== Species ==
- Sinarella aegrota (Butler, 1879) Japan, Korea, China, Ussuri
- Sinarella albeola (Rothschild, 1915) New Guinea, Seram, Sulawesi, Borneo
- Sinarella c-album Owada Japan
- Sinarella cristulalis (Staudinger, 1892) south-eastern Siberia
- Sinarella discisigna (Moore, 1883) northern India, Nepal, Thailand
- Sinarella griseola Holloway, 2008 Borneo
- Sinarella itoi Owada, 1987 Japan
- Sinarella japonica (Butler, 1881) Japan, Ussuri
- Sinarella jinggangshana Wu, Liu & Han, 2025 China
- Sinarella lunifera (Moore, [1885]) Ceylon, Japan
- Sinarella nigrisigna (Leech, 1900) Japan, China, Taiwan
- Sinarella punctalis (Herz, 1904) Japan, Korea, Ussuri
- Sinarella rotundipennis Owada, 1982 Japan
