= Safidia =

Scientific classification
- Kingdom: Animalia
- Phylum: Arthropoda
- Class: Insecta
- Order: Lepidoptera
- Superfamily: Noctuoidea
- Family: Noctuidae (?)
- Subfamily: Catocalinae
- Genus: Safidia; Hampson, 1913
- Species: S. druceria

Binomial name
- Safidia druceria Nye, 1975

Synonyms
- Sypna azteca H. Druce, 1898; Safidia aztecana Strand, 1917; Safidia aztecella Strand, 1917; Safidia aztecoides Strand, 1917; Safidia isabella Draudt, 1940

Genus of moths

Safidia is a monotypic moth genus of the family Noctuidae erected by George Hampson in 1913. Its only species, Safidia druceria, was first described by Nye in 1975. It was found in Xalapa, Mexico.
