= Scotocampa =

Scientific classification
- Domain: Eukaryota
- Kingdom: Animalia
- Phylum: Arthropoda
- Class: Insecta
- Order: Lepidoptera
- Superfamily: Noctuoidea
- Family: Noctuidae
- Genus: Scotocampa; Staudinger, 1888

Genus of moths

Scotocampa is a genus of moths of the family Noctuidae.

== Species ==
- Scotocampa crassipuncta (Püngeler, 1905)
- Scotocampa indigesta Staudinger, 1888
- Scotocampa sheljuzhkoi Gyulai & Ronkay, 2002
