= Singara (moth) =

Scientific classification
- Kingdom: Animalia
- Phylum: Arthropoda
- Clade: Pancrustacea
- Class: Insecta
- Order: Lepidoptera
- Superfamily: Noctuoidea
- Family: Erebidae
- Subfamily: Calpinae
- Genus: Singara; Walker, 1865

Type species
- Singara diversalis Walker, 1865

Genus of moths

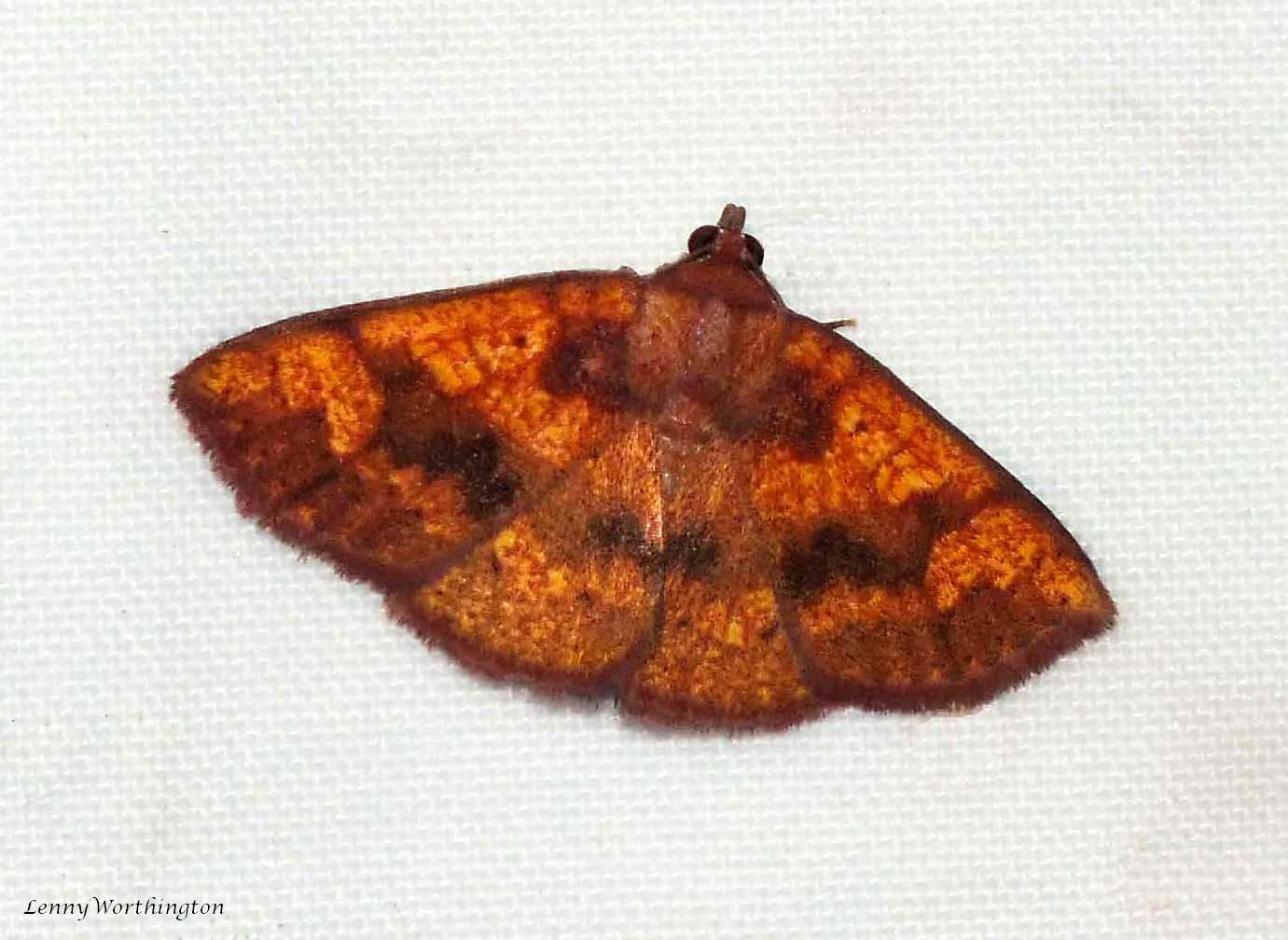
Singara diversalis

Singara is a genus of moths in the family Erebidae. The genus was established by Francis Walker in 1865.

== Species ==
- Singara diversalis Walker, 1865 north-eastern Himalayas, Myanmar, Thailand, southern China, Sumatra, Borneo
- Singara humberti Viette, 1966 Madagascar
- Singara mantasoa Viette, 1981 Madagascar
- Singara marojejy Viette, 1981 Madagascar
- Singara ochreoplagata Bethune-Baker, 1908 New Guinea
- Singara ochreostrigata Bethune-Baker, 1908 New Guinea
- Singara ovalis Viette, 1981
- Singara vaovalis Viette, 1981 Madagascar
