= Storthoptera =

Scientific classification
- Domain: Eukaryota
- Kingdom: Animalia
- Phylum: Arthropoda
- Class: Insecta
- Order: Lepidoptera
- Superfamily: Noctuoidea
- Family: Noctuidae (?)
- Subfamily: Catocalinae
- Genus: Storthoptera; Herrich-Schäffer, 1856
- Species: S. tripuncta

Binomial name
- Storthoptera tripuncta Herrich-Schäffer, 1855

Genus of moths

Storthoptera is a monotypic moth genus of the family Noctuidae. Its only species, Storthoptera tripuncta, is found in Africa. Both the genus and the species were first described by Gottlieb August Wilhelm Herrich-Schäffer, the genus in 1856 and the species one year earlier.
