= Semiothisops =

Scientific classification
- Kingdom: Animalia
- Phylum: Arthropoda
- Class: Insecta
- Order: Lepidoptera
- Superfamily: Noctuoidea
- Family: Erebidae
- Subfamily: Calpinae
- Genus: Semiothisops; Hampson, 1926
- Species: S. macariata

Binomial name
- Semiothisops macariata (Hampson, 1902)

Synonyms
- Zethes macariata Hampson, 1902

Genus of moths

Semiothisops is a monotypic moth genus of the family Erebidae. Its only species, Semiothisops macariata, is found in the north-east Himalayas, Thailand, Peninsular Malaysia, Taiwan, Sumatra, Borneo and Sulawesi. Both the genus and species were first described by George Hampson, the genus in 1926 and the species 24 years earlier in 1902.
