= Stenoxia =

Scientific classification
- Kingdom: Animalia
- Phylum: Arthropoda
- Class: Insecta
- Order: Lepidoptera
- Superfamily: Noctuoidea
- Family: Erebidae
- Subfamily: Calpinae
- Genus: Stenoxia; Hampson, 1926

Genus of moths

Stenoxia is a genus of moths of the family Erebidae. The genus was erected by George Hampson in 1926.

== Species ==
- Stenoxia albopunctata Walker, 1862
- Stenoxia astylos Schaus, 1914
- Stenoxia conformens Dyar, 1914
- Stenoxia contenta Dyar, 1914
- Stenoxia cybele Schaus, 1914
- Stenoxia dilmis Dyar, 1914
- Stenoxia erythropis Hampson, 1926
- Stenoxia extirpens Dyar, 1914
- Stenoxia florens Schaus, 1912
- Stenoxia pupillata Hampson, 1926
- Stenoxia rubecula Felder, 1874
- Stenoxia unifacta Dyar, 1914
