= Synorthodes =

Scientific classification
- Kingdom: Animalia
- Phylum: Arthropoda
- Class: Insecta
- Order: Lepidoptera
- Superfamily: Noctuoidea
- Family: Noctuidae
- Tribe: Eriopygini
- Genus: Synorthodes; Franclemont, 1976

Genus of moths

Synorthodes is a genus of moths of the family Noctuidae.

== Species ==
- Synorthodes auriginea Franclemont, 1976
- Synorthodes melanops (Dyar, 1912)
- Synorthodes typhedana Franclemont, 1976
