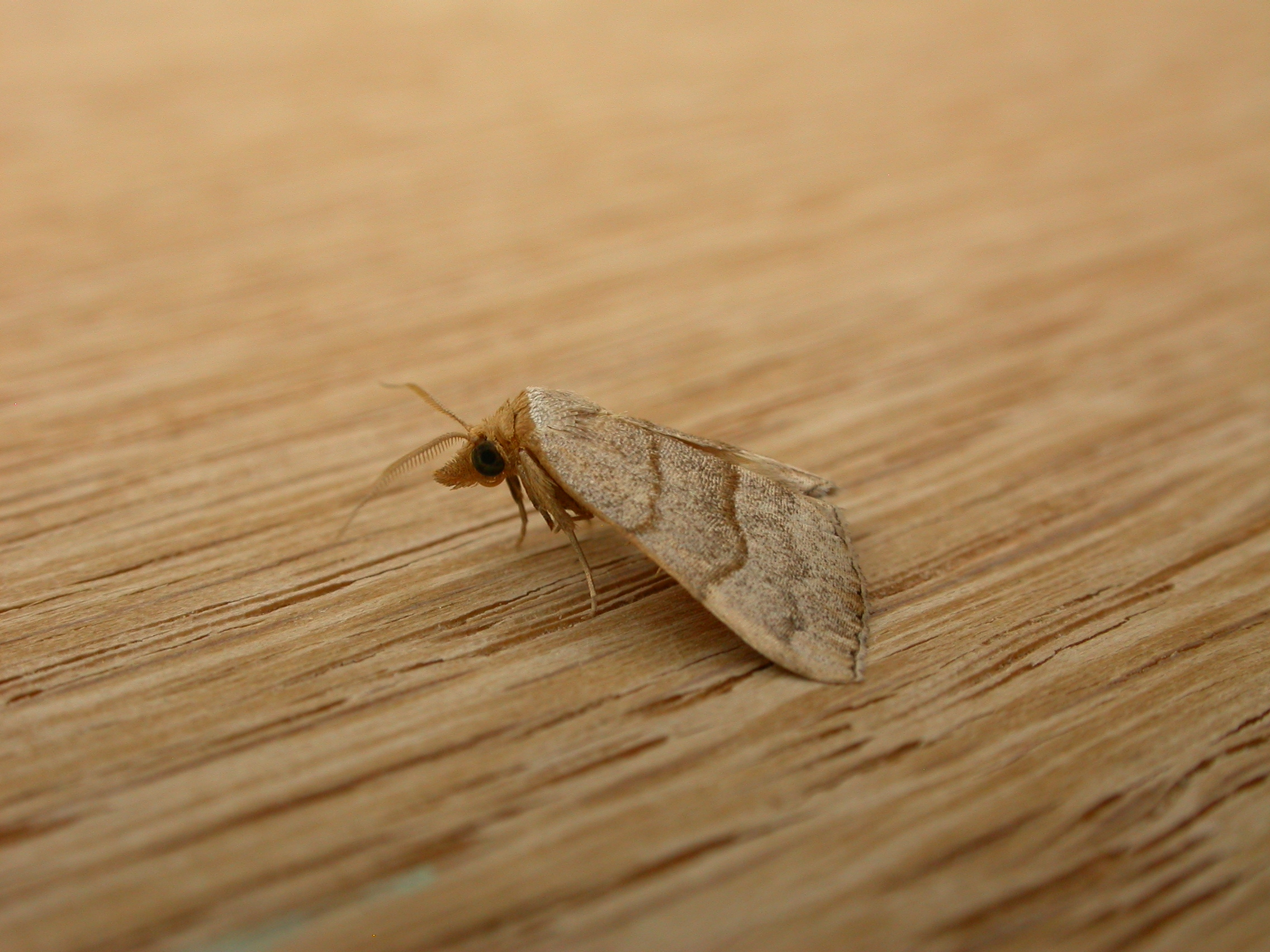
- Meranda susialis

Scientific classification
- Kingdom: Animalia
- Phylum: Arthropoda
- Class: Insecta
- Order: Lepidoptera
- Superfamily: Noctuoidea
- Family: Erebidae
- Subfamily: Calpinae
- Genus: Meranda; Walker, [1866]

Synonyms
- Synthaca Turner, 1908

= Meranda =

Genus of moths

Meranda is a genus of moths belonging to the family of Noctuidae. The genus was erected by Francis Walker in 1866.

== Species ==
- Meranda gilviceps Turner, 1908
- Meranda holochrysa Meyrick, 1902
- Meranda susialis Walker, 1859
