= Stibaena =

Scientific classification
- Kingdom: Animalia
- Phylum: Arthropoda
- Class: Insecta
- Order: Lepidoptera
- Superfamily: Noctuoidea
- Family: Erebidae
- Subfamily: Calpinae
- Genus: Stibaena; Walker, 1858
- Species: S. hostilis

Binomial name
- Stibaena hostilis Walker, 1858

Genus of moths

Stibaena is a monotypic moth genus of the family Erebidae. Its only species, Stibaena hostilis, is found in the Brazilian state of Pará. Both the genus and species were first described by Francis Walker in 1858.
