= Stenocodia =

Scientific classification
- Kingdom: Animalia
- Phylum: Arthropoda
- Class: Insecta
- Order: Lepidoptera
- Superfamily: Noctuoidea
- Family: Noctuidae
- Subfamily: Acontiinae
- Genus: Stenocodia; Hampson, 1910
- Species: S. purpurascens

Binomial name
- Stenocodia purpurascens Hampson, 1910

Genus of moths

Stenocodia is a monotypic moth genus of the family Noctuidae. Its only species, Stenocodia purpurascens, is found in French Guiana. Both the genus and species were first described by George Hampson in 1910.
