= Sarmatia (moth) =

Scientific classification
- Kingdom: Animalia
- Phylum: Arthropoda
- Class: Insecta
- Order: Lepidoptera
- Superfamily: Noctuoidea
- Family: Erebidae
- Subfamily: Hypeninae
- Genus: Sarmatia; Guenée in Boisduval & Guenée, 1854

Synonyms
- Suma Walker, [1866]; Ricla Walker, 1869

Genus of moths

Sarmatia is a genus of moths of the family Erebidae. The genus was erected by Achille Guenée in 1854.

== Species ==
- Sarmatia albolineata Bethune-Baker, 1911 Angola
- Sarmatia ankasoka Viette, 1979 Madagascar
- Sarmatia expandens (Walker, 1869)
- Sarmatia indenta Bethune-Baker, 1909
- Sarmatia interitalis Guenée, 1854 southern Africa
- Sarmatia malagasy Viette, 1968 Madagascar
- Sarmatia subpallescens (Holland, 1894) western Africa
- Sarmatia talhouki Wiltshire, 1982 Arabia
