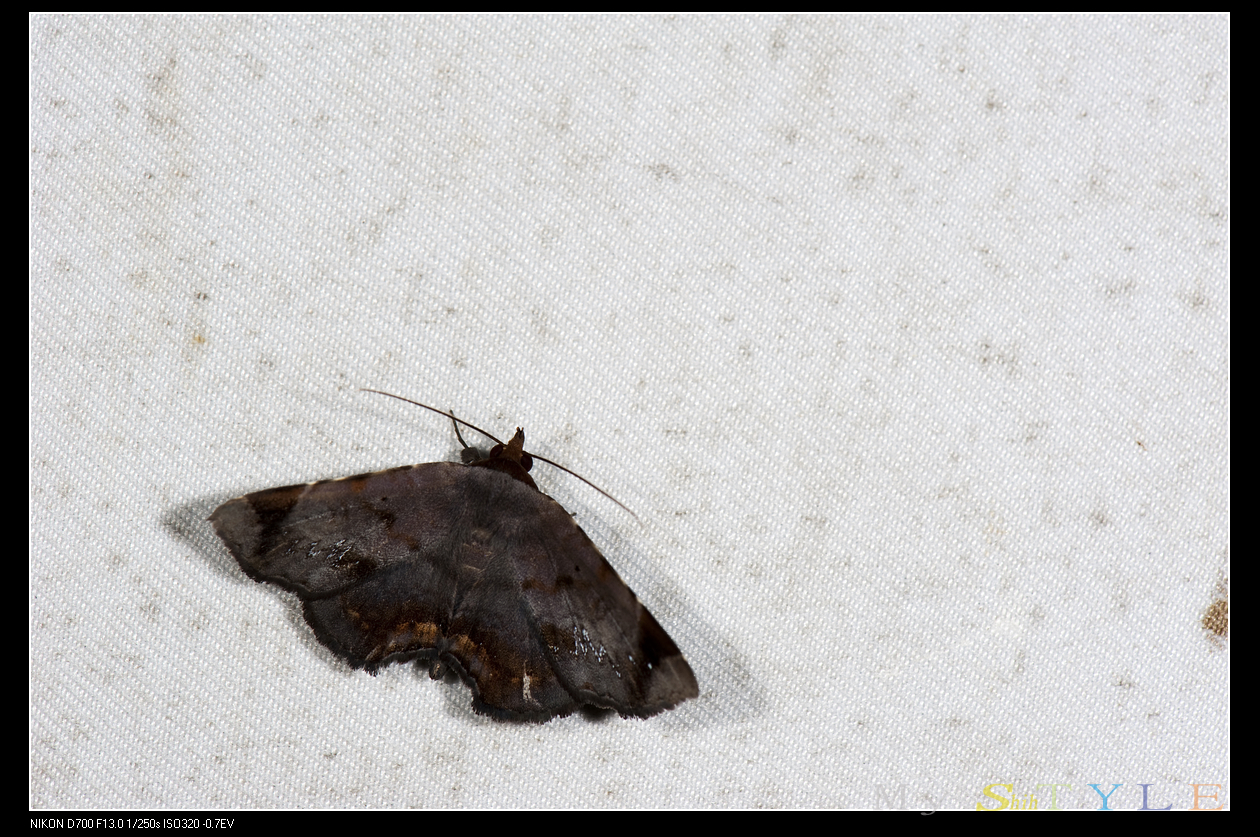
- Mecodina albodentata

Scientific classification
- Kingdom: Animalia
- Phylum: Arthropoda
- Class: Insecta
- Order: Lepidoptera
- Superfamily: Noctuoidea
- Family: Erebidae
- Subfamily: Calpinae
- Genus: Mecodina; Guenée in Boisduval & Guenée, 1852

Synonyms
- Boethantha Walker, 1865; Seneratia Moore, [1885]; Araeognatha Hampson, 1893

= Mecodina =

Genus of moths

Mecodina is a genus of moths of the family Erebidae first described by Achille Guenée in 1852.

== Description ==
Palpi sickle shaped, where the second joint reaching vertex of head. Third joint long and naked. Thorax and abdomen smoothly scaled. Mid and hind tibia slightly fringed with hair on outer side. Forewing with rectangular apex. Areole usually narrow. Hindwings with vein 5 from close to lower angle of cell.

== Species ==
- Mecodina aequilinea Hampson, 1926 Assam
- Mecodina africana (Holland, 1894) Gabon
- Mecodina agrestis (Swinhoe, 1890) Myanmar
- Mecodina albodentata (Swinhoe, 1895) India (Meghalaya)
- Mecodina ambigua Leech, 1900 western China
- Mecodina analis (Swinhoe, 1890) Myanmar
- Mecodina apicia Hampson, 1926 Ghana
- Mecodina bisignata (Walker, 1865) Timor, Sulawesi, New Guinea, Australia
- Mecodina cataloxia Viette, 1958 Madagascar
- Mecodina ceruleosparsa Hampson, 1907 Khasis
- Mecodina cineracea (Butler, 1879) Japan
- Mecodina costanotata Wileman & West, 1929 Philippines (Luzon)
- Mecodina costimacula Leech, 1900 western China
- Mecodina cyanodonta Hampson, 1902 Khasis
- Mecodina diastriga Hampson, 1926 Java
- Mecodina duplicata Leech, 1900 central China
- Mecodina externa Leech, 1900 central China
- Mecodina fasciata Sugi, 1982 Japan
- Mecodina hybrida Prout, 1926 Borneo
- Mecodina imperatrix (Holland, 1894) Gabon
- Mecodina inconspicua (Wileman & South, 1916) Taiwan
- Mecodina karapinensis Strand, 1920 Japan
- Mecodina kurosawai Sugi, 1982 Japan
- Mecodina lanceola Guenée, 1852 Bangladesh
- Mecodina lankesteri Leech, 1900 Sichuan
- Mecodina leucosticta Hampson, 1926 Singapore
- Mecodina metagrapta Hampson, 1926 Bali
- Mecodina mollita (Warren, 1913) Ichang
- Mecodina nigripuncta Hampson, 1926 Ghana
- Mecodina nubiferalis (Leech, 1889) Japan
- Mecodina ochrigraphta Hampson, 1926 southern Nigeria
- Mecodina odontophora (Swinhoe, 1895) Meghalaya
- Mecodina placida (Moore, 1882) western Bengal
- Mecodina praecipua (Walker, 1865) Sri Lanka
- Mecodina ruficeps Hampson, 1895 Nagas
- Mecodina rufipalpis Hampson, 1926 Angola
- Mecodina sichotensis (Kurentzov, 1950) south-eastern Siberia
- Mecodina subcostalis (Walker, 1865) northern China
- Mecodina subviolacea (Butler, 1881) Japan
- Mecodina umbrosa (Hampson, 1893) Sri Lanka
- Mecodina variata Robinson, 1969 Fiji
