= Syrrusis =

Scientific classification
- Kingdom: Animalia
- Phylum: Arthropoda
- Class: Insecta
- Order: Lepidoptera
- Superfamily: Noctuoidea
- Family: Noctuidae
- Genus: Syrrusis; Hampson, 1908

Type species
- Timaea pictura Sallmüller, 1891

Synonyms
- Atimaea Hampson, 1908

Genus of moths

Syrrusis is a genus of moths of the family Noctuidae.

== Species ==
- Syrrusis ethiopica (Hampson, 1907)
- Syrrusis milloti (Viette, 1972)
- Syrrusis monticola (Viette, 1959)
- Syrrusis notabilis (Butler, 1879)
- Syrrusis pictura (Saalmüller, 1891)
- Syrrusis vau (Berio, 1955)
