= Sotigena =

Scientific classification
- Domain: Eukaryota
- Kingdom: Animalia
- Phylum: Arthropoda
- Class: Insecta
- Order: Lepidoptera
- Superfamily: Noctuoidea
- Family: Erebidae
- Subfamily: Hypeninae
- Genus: Sotigena; H. Druce in Godman & Salvin, 1890

Genus of moths

Sotigena is a genus of moths of the family Erebidae. The genus was discovered by Herbert Druce in 1890.

== Species ==
- Sotigena dulcis H. Druce, 1890 Mexico
- Sotigena notodontoides H. Druce, 1890 Mexico
- Sotigena rictalis Dognin, 1914 Ecuador
- Sotigena solivaga Schaus, 1929 Brazil (Santa Catarina)
