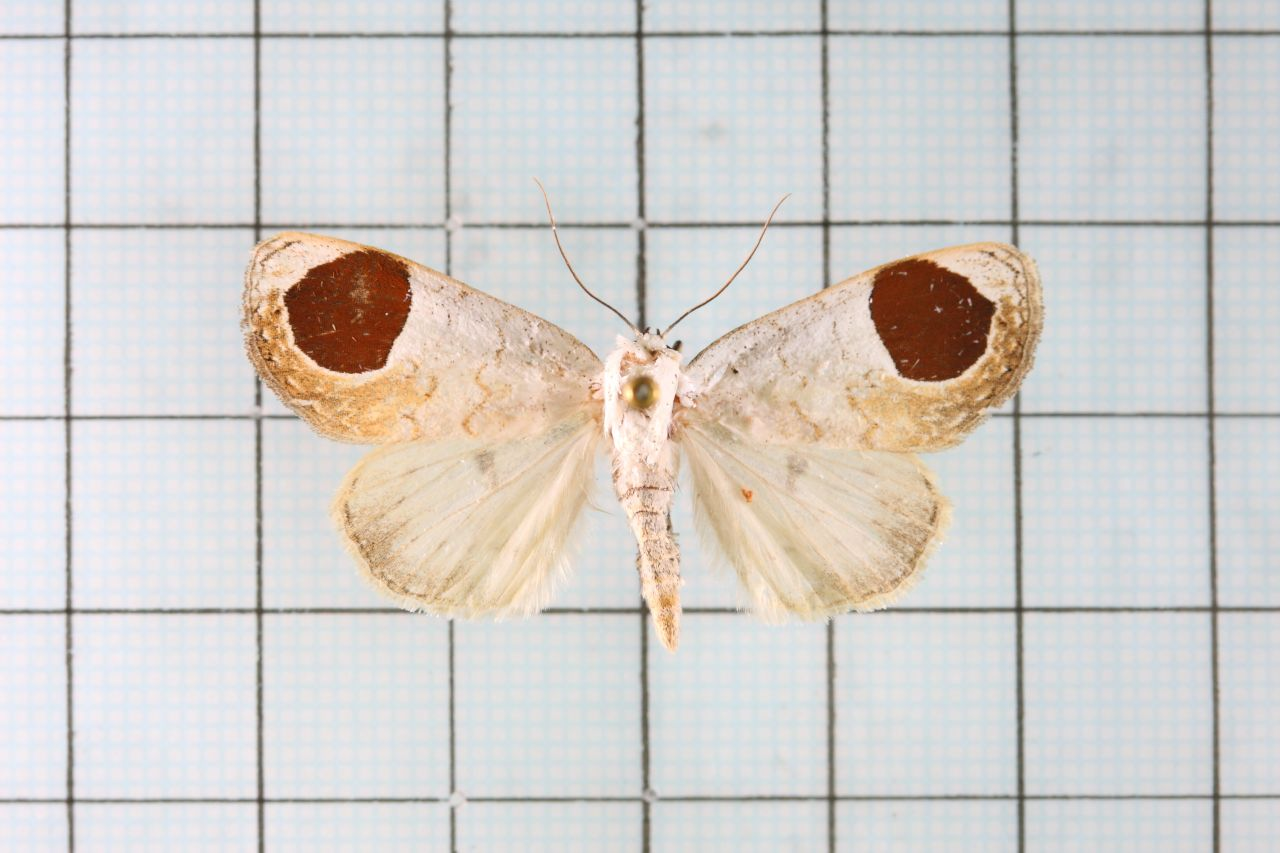

Scientific classification
- Domain: Eukaryota
- Kingdom: Animalia
- Phylum: Arthropoda
- Class: Insecta
- Order: Lepidoptera
- Superfamily: Noctuoidea
- Family: Noctuidae
- Genus: Sphragifera; Staudinger, 1892

Synonyms
- Sphragidifera Bryk, 1949

= Sphragifera =

Genus of moths

Sphragifera is a genus of moths of the family Noctuidae.

== Species ==
- Sphragifera biplagiata (Walker, 1865)
- Sphragifera maculata (Hampson, 1894)
- Sphragifera rejecta (Fabricius, 1775)
- Sphragifera sigillata (Menetries, 1859)
