= Stenopterygia =

- Stenopterygia tenebrosa

Scientific classification
- Kingdom: Animalia
- Phylum: Arthropoda
- Class: Insecta
- Order: Lepidoptera
- Superfamily: Noctuoidea
- Family: Noctuidae
- Genus: Stenopterygia; Hampson, 1908

Genus of moths

Stenopterygia is a genus of moths of the family Noctuidae.

== Species ==
- Stenopterygia calida (Walker, 1862)
- Stenopterygia firmivena Prout, 1927
- Stenopterygia gabonensis Laporte, 1974
- Stenopterygia kebea (Bethune-Baker, 1906)
- Stenopterygia khasiana (Hampson, 1894)
- Stenopterygia monostigma (Saalmüller, 1891)
- Stenopterygia nausoriensis Robinson, 1975
- Stenopterygia rufitincta Hampson, 1918
- Stenopterygia subcurva (Walker, 1857)
- Stenopterygia tenebrosa Hampson, 1908
