= Sarunga =

Scientific classification
- Kingdom: Animalia
- Phylum: Arthropoda
- Class: Insecta
- Order: Lepidoptera
- Superfamily: Noctuoidea
- Family: Erebidae
- Subfamily: Calpinae
- Genus: Sarunga; Walker, 1869
- Species: S. calida

Binomial name
- Sarunga calida Walker, 1869

Genus of moths

Sarunga is a monotypic moth genus of the family Erebidae. Its only species, Sarunga calida, is found in Bangladesh. Both the genus and species were first described by Francis Walker in 1869.
