= Synomera =

Scientific classification
- Domain: Eukaryota
- Kingdom: Animalia
- Phylum: Arthropoda
- Class: Insecta
- Order: Lepidoptera
- Superfamily: Noctuoidea
- Family: Erebidae
- Subfamily: Herminiinae
- Genus: Synomera; Schaus, 1916

Genus of moths

Synomera is a genus of moths of the family Erebidae. The genus was described by William Schaus in 1916.

== Species ==
- Synomera alcis (Schaus, 1914) French Guiana
- Synomera corazalis Schaus, 1916 Panama
- Synomera crafti Schaus, 1916 Panama
- Synomera cyllarus Schaus, 1916 French Guiana
- Synomera francalis (Schaus, 1906) Brazil (São Paulo)
- Synomera hylonome Schaus, 1916
- Synomera isthmialis Schaus, 1916 Panama
- Synomera pedroalis Schaus, 1916 Brazil (Rio de Janeiro)
- Synomera procrustes Schaus, 1916 French Guiana
- Synomera tanga Schaus, 1916 Trinidad
- Synomera tatalga Schaus, 1916 Brazil (São Paulo)
