= Saaluncifera =

Scientific classification
- Kingdom: Animalia
- Phylum: Arthropoda
- Clade: Pancrustacea
- Class: Insecta
- Order: Lepidoptera
- Superfamily: Noctuoidea
- Family: Noctuidae
- Subfamily: Hadeninae
- Genus: Saaluncifera; Berio, 1966

Type species
- Saaluncifera uncinata Berio, 1966

Synonyms
- Atimaea Hampson, 1908

Genus of moths

Saaluncifera is a genus of moths of the family Noctuidae from Africa.

== Species ==
- Saaluncifera lamottei Laporte, 1972
- Saaluncifera uncinata (Saalmüller, 1891)
