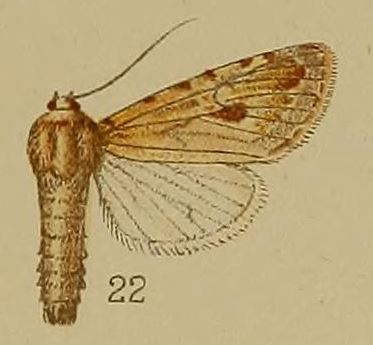
- Scythocentropus scripturosa

Scientific classification
- Kingdom: Animalia
- Phylum: Arthropoda
- Class: Insecta
- Order: Lepidoptera
- Superfamily: Noctuoidea
- Family: Noctuidae
- Genus: Scythocentropus; Speiser, 1902

Synonyms
- Centropodia Hampson, 1908; Centropus Christoph, 1889; Hugonia Alpheraky, 1902

= Scythocentropus =

Genus of moths

Scythocentropus is a genus of moths of the family Noctuidae.

== Species ==
- Scythocentropus eberti Hacker, 2001
- Scythocentropus inquinata (Mabille, 1888)
- Scythocentropus misella (Püngeler, 1908)
- Scythocentropus scripturosa (Eversmann, 1854)
- Scythocentropus singalesia (Hampson, 1918)
