= Azenia perflava =

Scientific classification
- Domain: Eukaryota
- Kingdom: Animalia
- Phylum: Arthropoda
- Class: Insecta
- Order: Lepidoptera
- Superfamily: Noctuoidea
- Family: Noctuidae
- Subfamily: Metoponiinae
- Genus: Azenia
- Species: A. perflava

Binomial name
- Azenia perflava (Harvey, 1875)

Species of moth

Azenia perflava is a species of moth in the family Noctuidae (the owlet moths).

The MONA or Hodges number for Azenia perflava is 9727.
