= Saltia =

Scientific classification
- Domain: Eukaryota
- Kingdom: Animalia
- Phylum: Arthropoda
- Class: Insecta
- Order: Lepidoptera
- Superfamily: Noctuoidea
- Family: Noctuidae
- Subfamily: Noctuinae
- Genus: Saltia; Tams, 1952

Species
- See text

Genus of moths

Saltia is a genus of moths of the family Noctuidae, endemic to the high mountains of East Africa.

== Species ==
Two species have been described, both collected by George Salt in 1948:

- Saltia acrophylax Tams, 1952 (Kilimanjaro)
- Saltia edwardsi Tams, 1952 (Mount Elgon)

There is a third form on Mount Kenya, likely a third species, with one specimen in the National Museums of Kenya. This, and the above-named collections by Salt, appear to be the only collection of this genus.
