= Stenostygia =

Scientific classification
- Kingdom: Animalia
- Phylum: Arthropoda
- Class: Insecta
- Order: Lepidoptera
- Superfamily: Noctuoidea
- Family: Noctuidae
- Subfamily: Acontiinae
- Genus: Stenostygia; Hampson, 1910
- Species: S. nigritula

Binomial name
- Stenostygia nigritula (Hampson, 1896)

Synonyms
- Tarache nigritula Hampson, 1896

Genus of moths

Stenostygia is a monotypic moth genus of the family Noctuidae. Its only species, Stenostygia nigritula, is found in Sri Lanka. Both the genus and species were first described by George Hampson, the genus in 1910 and the species 14 years earlier in 1896.
