= Staga =

Scientific classification
- Domain: Eukaryota
- Kingdom: Animalia
- Phylum: Arthropoda
- Class: Insecta
- Order: Lepidoptera
- Superfamily: Noctuoidea
- Family: Erebidae
- Subfamily: Hypeninae
- Genus: Staga; Mabille, 1900
- Species: S. producta

Binomial name
- Staga producta Mabille, 1900

Genus of moths

Staga is a monotypic genus of moths of the family Noctuidae, containing the single species Staga producta from Madagascar.
