= Santiaxis =

Scientific classification
- Kingdom: Animalia
- Phylum: Arthropoda
- Class: Insecta
- Order: Lepidoptera
- Superfamily: Noctuoidea
- Family: Erebidae
- Subfamily: Herminiinae
- Genus: Santiaxis; Schaus, 1916
- Species: S. copima

Binomial name
- Santiaxis copima Schaus, 1916

Genus of moths

Santiaxis is a monotypic moth genus of the family Erebidae. Its only species, Santiaxis copima, is known from Cuba. Both the genus and the species were first described by William Schaus in 1916.
