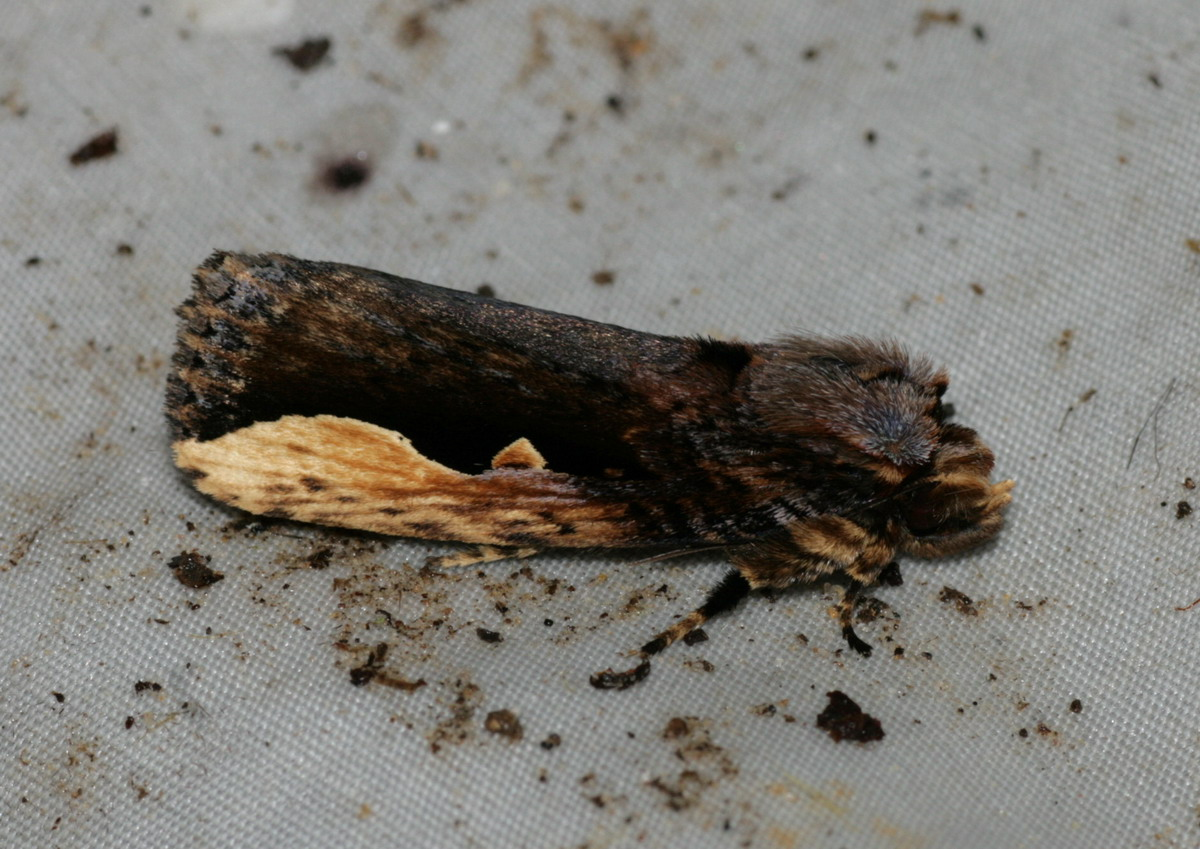
- Sphetta bornea

Scientific classification
- Kingdom: Animalia
- Phylum: Arthropoda
- Class: Insecta
- Order: Lepidoptera
- Superfamily: Noctuoidea
- Family: Noctuidae
- Genus: Sphetta; Walker, 1865

= Sphetta =

Genus of insects

Sphetta is a genus of moths of the family Noctuidae first described by Francis Walker in 1865.

== Description ==
Its eyes are naked. Palpi obliquely porrect (extending forward), reaching beyond the frons, where the second joint is heavily hairy. Antennae fasciculated (bundled). Thorax and abdomen smoothly scaled. Abdomen is long. Tibia without spines. Forewings broad and rounded. Vein 3 from long before end of cell. Hindwings with veins 6 and 7 on a short stalk, vein 8 running close along vein 7 to middle of cell.

== Species ==
- Sphetta apicalis Walker, 1865
- Sphetta bornea Holloway, 1989
