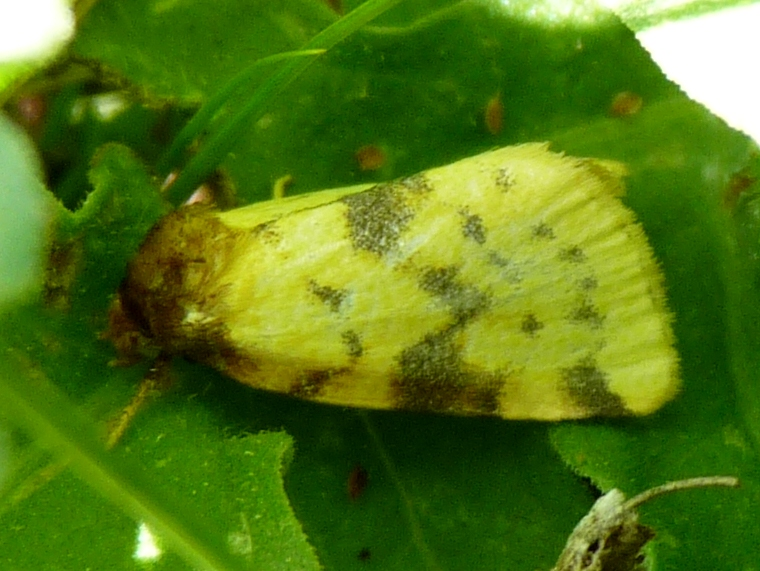

Scientific classification
- Kingdom: Animalia
- Phylum: Arthropoda
- Clade: Pancrustacea
- Class: Insecta
- Order: Lepidoptera
- Superfamily: Noctuoidea
- Family: Noctuidae
- Genus: Azenia
- Species: A. obtusa

Binomial name
- Azenia obtusa (Herrich-Schäffer, 1854)

Synonyms
- Stiriodes obtusa Herrich-Schõffer, 1854; Metoponia obtusa

= Azenia obtusa =

Species of moth

Azenia obtusa, the obtuse yellow moth, is a moth of the family Noctuidae. The species was first described by Gottlieb August Wilhelm Herrich-Schäffer in 1854. It is found in North America from southern Ontario and New York to Florida and west to Texas and Missouri.

The wingspan is 18–25 mm. They are on wing from June to August.

The larvae feed on Ambrosia trifida.
