= Scambina =

Scientific classification
- Kingdom: Animalia
- Phylum: Arthropoda
- Class: Insecta
- Order: Lepidoptera
- Superfamily: Noctuoidea
- Family: Erebidae
- Subfamily: Calpinae
- Genus: Scambina; Walker, 1865

Synonyms
- Raclia Walker, 1869

Genus of moths

Scambina is a genus of moths of the family Erebidae. The genus was erected by Francis Walker in 1865.

== Species ==
- Scambina aliena Walker, 1865 Sierra Leone
- Scambina cervina Walker, 1873
- Scambina roseipicta (H. Druce, 1911) Cameroon
