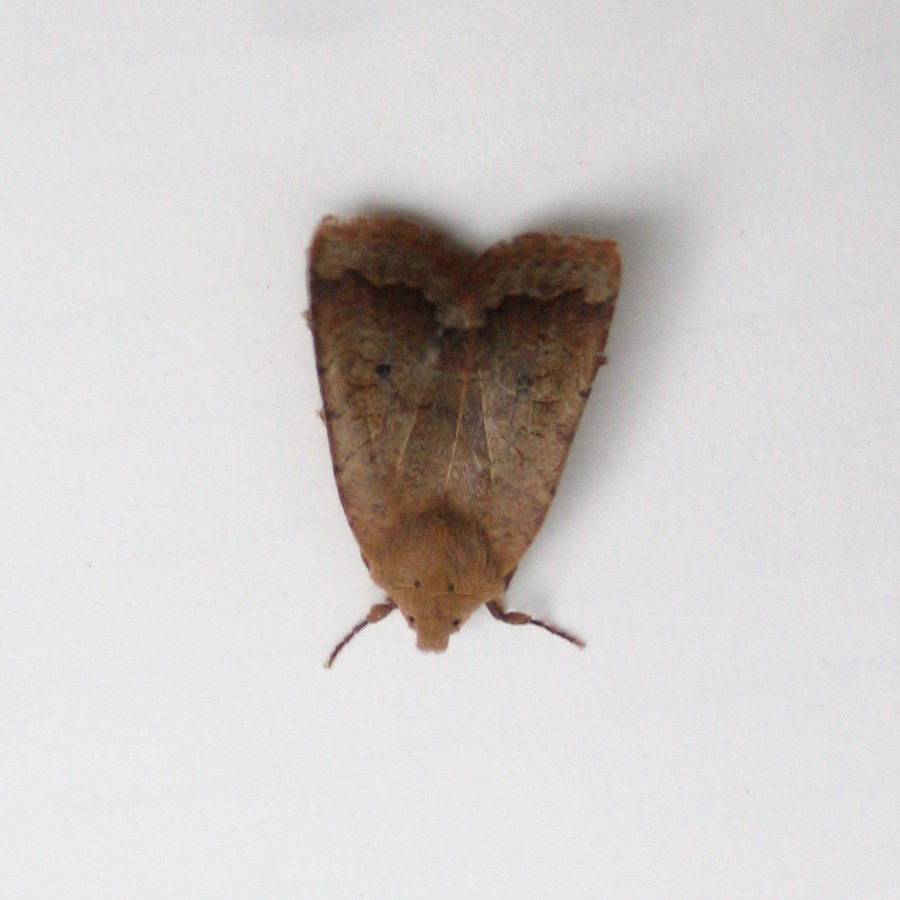

Scientific classification
- Domain: Eukaryota
- Kingdom: Animalia
- Phylum: Arthropoda
- Class: Insecta
- Order: Lepidoptera
- Superfamily: Noctuoidea
- Family: Noctuidae
- Subfamily: Cuculliinae
- Genus: Sericaglaea; Franclemont, 1941

= Sericaglaea =

Genus of moths

Sericaglaea is a genus of moths of the family Noctuidae.

== Species ==
- Sericaglaea adulta (Guenée, 1852)
- Sericaglaea signata (French, 1879)
