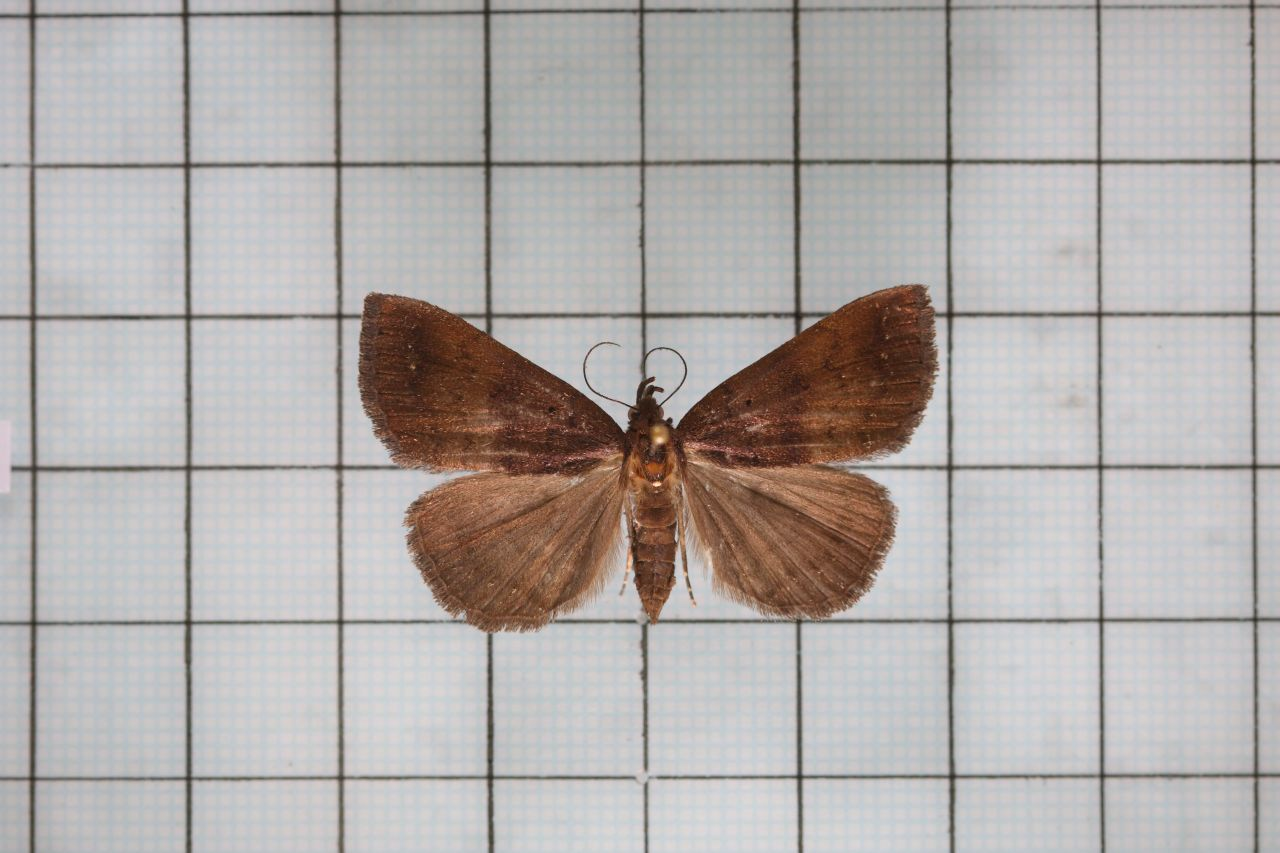
- Squamipalpis subnubila

Scientific classification
- Domain: Eukaryota
- Kingdom: Animalia
- Phylum: Arthropoda
- Class: Insecta
- Order: Lepidoptera
- Superfamily: Noctuoidea
- Family: Erebidae
- Subfamily: Herminiinae
- Genus: Squamipalpis; Bethune-Baker, 1908

= Squamipalpis =

Genus of moths

Squamipalpis is a genus of moths of the family Noctuidae first described by George Thomas Bethune-Baker in 1908.

== Selected species ==
- Squamipalpis melanostalus (Rothschild, 1920)
- Squamipalpis pantoea (Turner, 1908)
- Squamipalpis subnubila (Leech, 1900)
- Squamipalpis unilineata Bethune-Baker, 1908
