= Stygionyx =

Scientific classification
- Kingdom: Animalia
- Phylum: Arthropoda
- Class: Insecta
- Order: Lepidoptera
- Superfamily: Noctuoidea
- Family: Erebidae
- Subfamily: Calpinae
- Genus: Stygionyx; Hampson, 1926
- Species: S. montana

Binomial name
- Stygionyx montana Joicey & Talbot, 1917

Genus of moths

Stygionyx is a monotypic moth genus of the family Erebidae erected by George Hampson in 1926. Its only species, Stygionyx montana, was first described by James John Joicey and George Talbot in 1917. It is found in New Guinea.
