= Stenhypena =

Scientific classification
- Kingdom: Animalia
- Phylum: Arthropoda
- Class: Insecta
- Order: Lepidoptera
- Superfamily: Noctuoidea
- Family: Erebidae
- Subfamily: Hypeninae
- Genus: Stenhypena; Hampson, 1895

Type species
- Hypena adustalis Hampson, 1893

Synonyms
- Parhypena Bethune-Baker, 1908; Consobrambus Berio, 1977

Genus of moths

Stenhypena is a genus of moths of the family Erebidae erected by George Hampson in 1895. The type species was first found in Sri Lanka.

== Description ==
It is similar to species of genus Hypena, but differs in the forewings being narrower and of almost even width throughout, the outer margin nearly erect. The areole very small, vein 10 given off far beyond it. There are raised specks in and at end of cell. Hindwings with veins 3, 4 and 6, 7 stalked. Palpi with the second joint of moderate length and fringed with hair above, the third joint upturned and hairy, with naked apex.

== Selected species ==
- Stenhypena adustalis (Hampson, 1893) (from Sri Lanka, Taiwan)
- Stenhypena albopunctata (Bethune-Baker, 1908) (Australia, Papua New Guinea and Indonesia)
- Stenhypena costalis Wileman & South, 1916 (from Taiwan)
- Stenhypena longipennis Owada, 1982 (from Japan)
- Stenhypena maculifera de Joannis, 1929 (from Vietnam)
- Stenhypena nigripuncta (Wileman, 1911) (from Japan)
- Stenhypena linpingia (Berio, 1977) (from China)
