= Sugia =

Scientific classification
- Domain: Eukaryota
- Kingdom: Animalia
- Phylum: Arthropoda
- Class: Insecta
- Order: Lepidoptera
- Superfamily: Noctuoidea
- Family: Noctuidae
- Subfamily: Acontiinae
- Genus: Sugia; Ueda, 1984

Genus of moths

Sugia is a genus of moths of the family Noctuidae. The genus was described by Ueda in 1984.

== Species ==
- Sugia elaeostygia (Sugi, 1982) Japan
- Sugia idiostygia (Sugi, 1958) Japan
- Sugia rufa Ueda, 1987 Taiwan
- Sugia stygia (Butler, 1878) Korea, Japan
- Sugia stygiodes (Sugi, 1958) Japan, Taiwan
