= Stenbergmania =

Scientific classification
- Kingdom: Animalia
- Phylum: Arthropoda
- Class: Insecta
- Order: Lepidoptera
- Superfamily: Noctuoidea
- Family: Erebidae
- Subfamily: Hypeninae
- Genus: Stenbergmania; Bryk, 1949
- Species: S. albomaculalis

Binomial name
- Stenbergmania albomaculalis (Bremer, 1864)

Genus of moths

Stenbergmania is a monotypic moth genus of the family Erebidae erected by Felix Bryk in 1949. Its only species, Stenbergmania albomaculalis, was first described by Otto Vasilievich Bremer in 1864. It is found in southeastern Siberia.
