= Scutirodes =

Scientific classification
- Domain: Eukaryota
- Kingdom: Animalia
- Phylum: Arthropoda
- Class: Insecta
- Order: Lepidoptera
- Superfamily: Noctuoidea
- Family: Erebidae
- Subfamily: Herminiinae
- Genus: Scutirodes; Schaus, 1916
- Species: S. apis

Binomial name
- Scutirodes apis (H. Druce, 1891)

Synonyms
- Hypenodes apis Druce, 1891

Genus of moths

Scutirodes is a monotypic moth genus of the family Erebidae described by Schaus in 1916. Its only species, Scutirodes apis, was first described by Herbert Druce in 1891. It is found in Guatemala and Panama.
