= Synalamis =

Scientific classification
- Domain: Eukaryota
- Kingdom: Animalia
- Phylum: Arthropoda
- Class: Insecta
- Order: Lepidoptera
- Superfamily: Noctuoidea
- Family: Erebidae
- Subfamily: Calpinae
- Genus: Synalamis; Dognin, 1912

Genus of insects

Synalamis is a genus of moths of the family Erebidae. The genus was erected by Paul Dognin in 1912.

== Species ==
- Synalamis abaris (Herrich-Schäffer, [1869]) Venezuela
- Synalamis amplificata (Felder & Rogenhofer, 1874) Brazil (Amazonas)
- Synalamis brunneoviridans Dognin, 1921 Colombia
- Synalamis cometas (Dognin, 1914) Colombia
- Synalamis expallida (Dognin, 1914) Ecuador
- Synalamis grisescens (Dognin, 1914) Peru
- Synalamis indistincta (Dognin, 1914) Ecuador
- Synalamis micropis (Hampson, 1926) Argentina (Mendoza)
- Synalamis polioides (Guenée, 1852) Chile
- Synalamis rufescens (Hampson, 1926) Argentina (Tucuman)
- Synalamis tremula (Schaus, 1901) Venezuela
