= Sinosia =

Scientific classification
- Domain: Eukaryota
- Kingdom: Animalia
- Phylum: Arthropoda
- Class: Insecta
- Order: Lepidoptera
- Superfamily: Noctuoidea
- Family: Erebidae
- Subfamily: Calpinae
- Genus: Sinosia; Schaus, 1914
- Species: S. inornata

Binomial name
- Sinosia inornata Schaus, 1914

Genus of moths

Sinosia is a monotypic moth genus of the family Erebidae. Its only species, Sinosia inornata, is found in French Guiana. Both the genus and species were first described by William Schaus in 1914.
