= Calophasidia =

- Calophasidia dentifera

Scientific classification
- Kingdom: Animalia
- Phylum: Arthropoda
- Clade: Pancrustacea
- Class: Insecta
- Order: Lepidoptera
- Superfamily: Noctuoidea
- Family: Noctuidae
- Genus: Calophasidia; Hampson, 1908

Type species
- Megalodes lucala Swinhoe, 1902

Synonyms
- Chelaprora Hampson, 1926; Stonychota Turner, 1941

Genus of moths

Calophasidia is a genus of moths of the family Noctuidae. The genus was erected by George Hampson in 1908. It is endemic to Australia.

The classification of this genus is unclear. It has been placed in the subfamily Hadeninae or Acronictinae; Keegan and colleagues (2021) considered its placement within Noctuidae as undefined (incertae sedis).

== Species ==
There are six species:

- Calophasidia cana (Turner, 1939)
- Calophasidia dentifera Hampson, 1909
- Calophasidia dichroa (Hampson, 1926)
- Calophasidia latens (Turner, 1929)
- Calophasidia lucala (Swinhoe, 1902)
- Calophasidia radiata (Swinhoe, 1902)
