= Steganiodes =

Scientific classification
- Kingdom: Animalia
- Phylum: Arthropoda
- Class: Insecta
- Order: Lepidoptera
- Superfamily: Noctuoidea
- Family: Noctuidae
- Subfamily: Acontiinae
- Genus: Steganiodes; Hampson, 1910

Genus of moths

Steganiodes is a genus of moths of the family Noctuidae. The genus was erected by George Hampson in 1910.

== Species ==
- Steganiodes albertina Hacker, Fiebig & Stadie, 2019 Uganda
- Steganiodes mesophaea Hampson, 1910 Benin, Liberia, southern Nigeria, Gabon, Tanzania, Uganda
