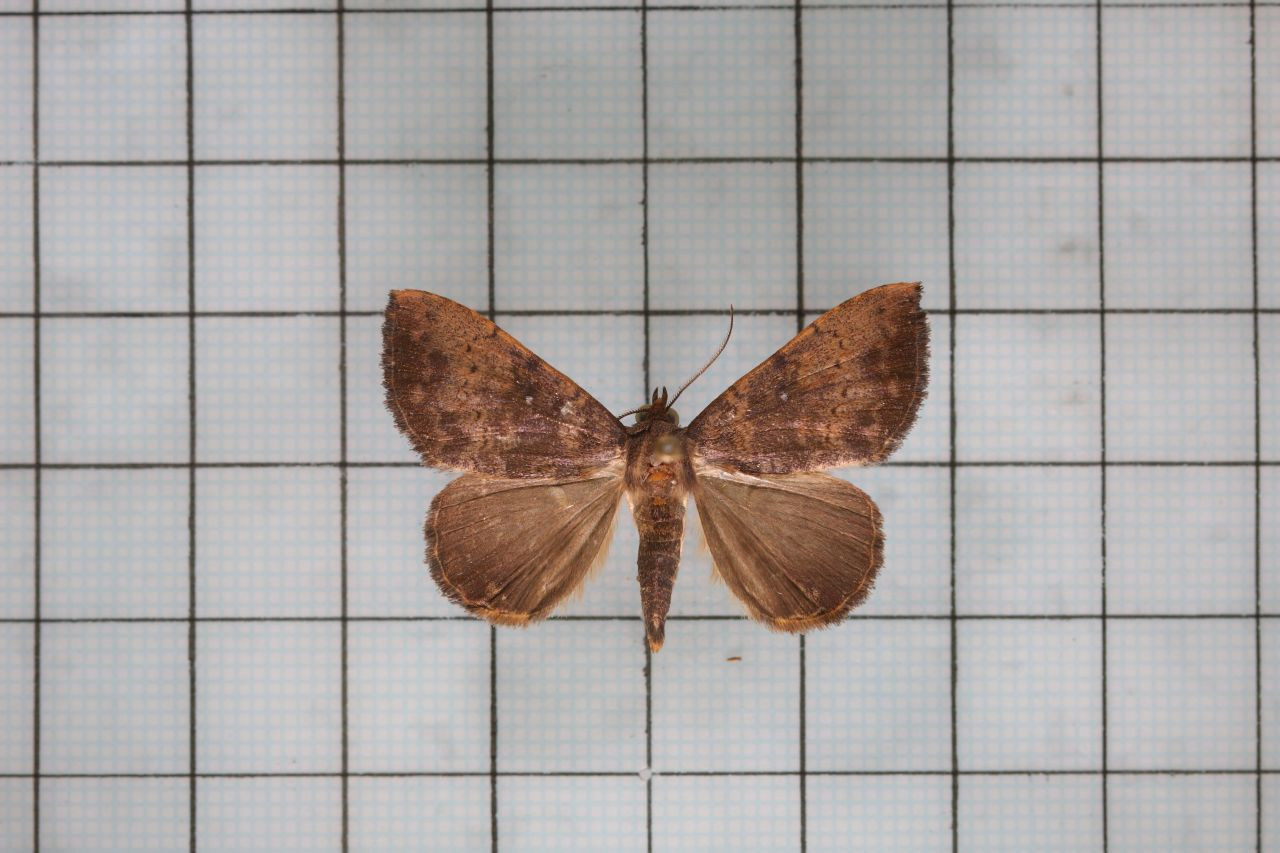
- Scedopla umbrosa (Wileman, 1916)

Scientific classification
- Domain: Eukaryota
- Kingdom: Animalia
- Phylum: Arthropoda
- Class: Insecta
- Order: Lepidoptera
- Superfamily: Noctuoidea
- Family: Erebidae
- Subfamily: Calpinae
- Genus: Scedopla; Butler, 1878

= Scedopla =

Genus of moths

Scedopla is a genus of moths of the family Noctuidae.

== Species ==
- Scedopla diffusa Sugi, 1959
- Scedopla inouei Sugi, 1982
- Scedopla regalis Butler, 1878
- Scedopla umbrosa (Wileman, 1916)
