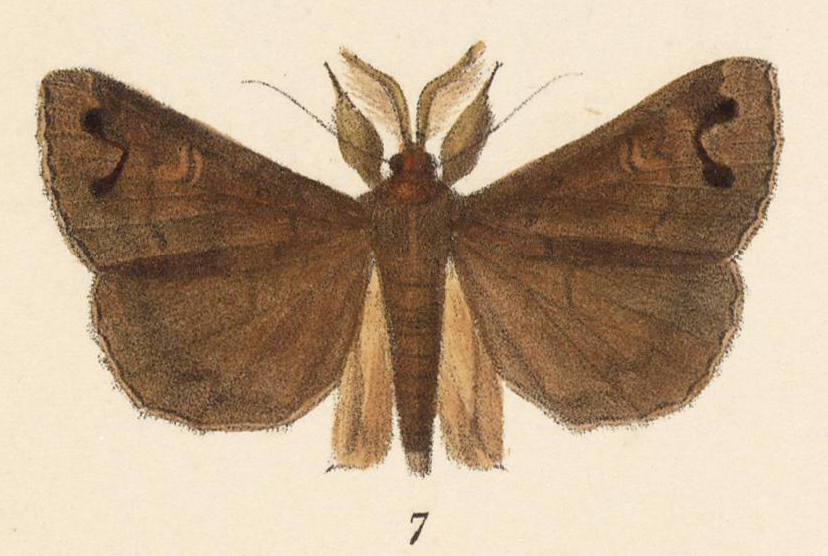
- Male S. ribbei
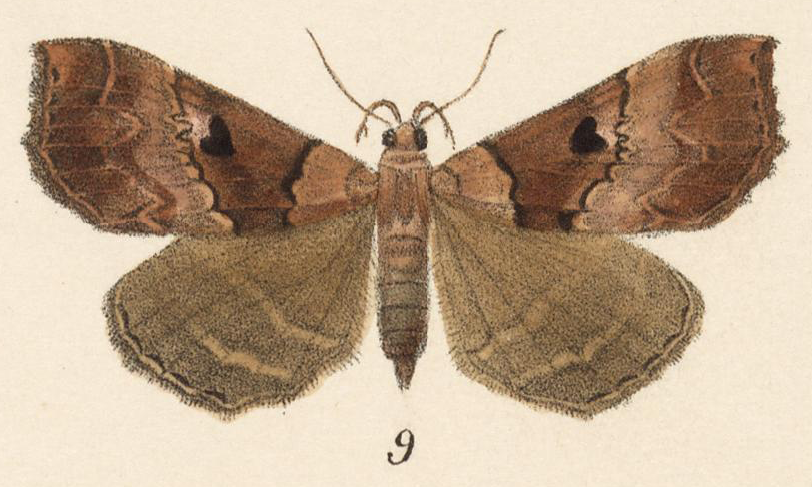
- Female S. imitata

Scientific classification
- Kingdom: Animalia
- Phylum: Arthropoda
- Class: Insecta
- Order: Lepidoptera
- Superfamily: Noctuoidea
- Family: Erebidae
- Subfamily: Herminiinae
- Genus: Strathocles; H. Druce, 1891

Type species
- Strathocles ribbei H. Druce, 1891

= Strathocles =

Genus of moths

Strathocles is a genus of moths of the family Noctuidae.

== Taxonomy ==
Strathocles was circumscribed by Herbert Druce in Biologia Centrali-Americana. He initially included two species, both described in the same work: S. ribbei, which Druce designated as the genus's type species, and S. imitata.

== Species ==
As of 2017, GBIF recognizes the following species:

- Strathocles albipulla Dognin, 1914
- Strathocles funebris Schaus, 1912
- Strathocles imitata H. Druce, 1891
- Strathocles magnipilosa Dognin, 1923
- Strathocles parvipulla Dognin, 1914
- Strathocles pulla Dognin, 1914
- Strathocles punctiuncula Dognin, 1914
- Strathocles ribbei H. Druce, 1891
