= Sitophora =

Scientific classification
- Kingdom: Animalia
- Phylum: Arthropoda
- Class: Insecta
- Order: Lepidoptera
- Superfamily: Noctuoidea
- Family: Erebidae
- Subfamily: Herminiinae
- Genus: Sitophora; Guenée in Boisduval & Guenée, 1854

Genus of moths

Sitophora is a genus of moths of the family Erebidae. The genus was erected by Achille Guenée in 1854.

== Species ==
- Sitophora lyces H. Druce, 1891 Panama
- Sitophora sueralis (Guenée, 1854) Brazil
- Sitophora vesiculalis Guenée, 1854 Brazil
