= Siccyna =

Scientific classification
- Domain: Eukaryota
- Kingdom: Animalia
- Phylum: Arthropoda
- Class: Insecta
- Order: Lepidoptera
- Superfamily: Noctuoidea
- Family: Erebidae
- Subfamily: Calpinae
- Genus: Siccyna; Nye, 1975

Synonyms
- Cynisca Fawcett, 1918

Genus of moths

Siccyna is a genus of moths of the family Erebidae. The genus was described by Nye in 1975.

== Species ==
- Siccyna reichi (Gaede, 1940) Liberia
- Siccyna thisbe (Fawcett, 1918) Kenya
