= Fleta (disambiguation) =

Fleta is a medieval treatise on the common law of England.

Fleta may also refer to:

- Fleet Prison (by its medieval Latin name)
- Fleta (moth), a moth genus in the family Noctuidae

Surname

- Ignacio Fleta, (1897–1977), Spanish luthier
- Miguel Fleta (1897–1938), Spanish tenor

Given name

- Fleta Jan Brown Spencer (1882–1938), American songwriter, composer, pianist and singer

Nickname

- Fleta (gamer), professional esports player Kim Byung-sun
