= Pseudopais =

Scientific classification
- Domain: Eukaryota
- Kingdom: Animalia
- Phylum: Arthropoda
- Class: Insecta
- Order: Lepidoptera
- Superfamily: Noctuoidea
- Family: Noctuidae
- Subfamily: Agaristinae
- Genus: Pseudopais; Bartel, 1903
- Species: P. nigrobasalis

Binomial name
- Pseudopais nigrobasalis Bartel, 1903

Synonyms
- Rothia subterminalis Hampson, 1911

Genus of moths

Pseudopais is a monotypic moth genus of the family Noctuidae. Its only species, Pseudopais nigrobasalis, is found in the countries of Malawi and Tanzania. Both the genus and species were first described by Max Bartel in 1903.

The Global Lepidoptera Names Index gives this name as a synonym of Brephos Hübner, [1813].
