= Japana =

Japana may refer to:

- Japana, Georgia, a town in the country of Georgia
- Japana-rhythm, an album by Bennie K
- Chelonomorpha japana, a moth species in the genus Chelonomorpha
- Cicindela japana, a beetle species in the genus Cicindela
- a vernacular name for Ayapana triplinervis, a tropical American shrub
