= Acyclania tenebrosa =

Scientific classification
- Domain: Eukaryota
- Kingdom: Animalia
- Phylum: Arthropoda
- Class: Insecta
- Order: Lepidoptera
- Superfamily: Noctuoidea
- Family: Noctuidae
- Genus: Acyclania
- Species: A. tenebrosa

Binomial name
- Acyclania tenebrosa Dognin, 1911

Synonyms
- Chlanidophora mariae Köhler, 1924; Caridarctia tenebrosa (Dognin)

Species of moth

Acyclania tenebrosa is a moth of the family Noctuidae first described by Paul Dognin in 1911. It is found in Argentina; it was historically misclassified, but in 2010 was determined to belong to the subfamily Agaristinae.
