= Acyclania schadei =

Scientific classification
- Domain: Eukaryota
- Kingdom: Animalia
- Phylum: Arthropoda
- Class: Insecta
- Order: Lepidoptera
- Superfamily: Noctuoidea
- Family: Noctuidae
- Genus: Acyclania
- Species: A. schadei

Binomial name
- Acyclania schadei Schaus, 1927

Species of moth

Acyclania schadei is a moth of the family Noctuidae first described by William Schaus in 1927. It is found in Paraguay. It was historically misclassified, but in 2010 was determined to belong to the subfamily Agaristinae.
