= Rhosus =

Rhosus may refer to:

== Places and jurisdictions ==
- Arsuz (Arsûs), formerly known as Rhosus, a coastal town in Hatay Province, Asian Turkey,
  - the former Diocese of Rhosus, with see in the above city in Cilicia Secunda, now a Latin Catholic titular see
- a place on the Pierian coast in Macedonia

== Other uses ==
- MV Rhosus (1986), a Moldovan-flagged cargo ship whose abandoned ammonium nitrate cargo fueled the 2020 Beirut explosion
- Rhosus (moth), a moth genus
