= Acyclania =

Scientific classification
- Domain: Eukaryota
- Kingdom: Animalia
- Phylum: Arthropoda
- Class: Insecta
- Order: Lepidoptera
- Superfamily: Noctuoidea
- Family: Noctuidae
- Subfamily: Agaristinae
- Genus: Acyclania; Dognin, 1911

Genus of moths

Acyclania is a genus of moths in the family Noctuidae first described by Paul Dognin in 1911. It was historically misclassified on multiple occasions, but in 2010 was determined to belong to the subfamily Agaristinae.

== Species ==
- Acyclania schadei Schaus, 1927 Paraguay
- Acyclania tenebrosa Dognin, 1911 Argentina, Brazil (Minas Gerais)
