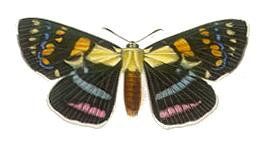
- Agarista agricola

Scientific classification
- Kingdom: Animalia
- Phylum: Arthropoda
- Clade: Pancrustacea
- Class: Insecta
- Order: Lepidoptera
- Superfamily: Noctuoidea
- Family: Noctuidae
- Subfamily: Agaristinae; Boisduval, 1833

= Agaristinae =

Subfamily of moths

Agaristinae is one of the larger subfamilies of moths in the family Noctuidae. The subfamily was erected by Jean Baptiste Boisduval in 1833. Its internal phylogeny and many genera are in need of review.

== Genera ==
- Acantuerta
- Aegocera
- Aegoceropsis
- Aethodes
- Agarista
- Agaristodes
- Agoma
- Aletopus
- Alloasteropetes
- Alypia
- Alypiodes
- Amazela
- Ancarista
- Andrhippuris
- Androloma
- Antigodasa
- Apaegocera
- Apina
- Arctiopais
- Argyrolepidia
- Arpia
- Arrothia
- Asteropetes
- Aucula
- Brephos
- Burgena
- Caularis
- Caularisia
- Chaetostephana
- Charitosemia
- Chelonomorpha
- Chlanidophora
- Choeropais
- Cisaucula
- Clitis
- Coenotoca
- Comocrus
- Copidryas
- Crameria
- Cremnophora
- Crinala
- Crinocula
- Cruria
- Cruriopsis
- Cyanohypsa
- Darceta
- Darcetina
- Depalpata
- Diamuna
- Epischausia
- Episteme
- Epithisanotia
- Erocha
- Eudryas
- Eupseudomorpha
- Euscirrhopterus
- Eutactis
- Eutrichopidia
- Exsula
- Fenaria
- Fleta
- Gerra
- Gerrodes
- Godasa
- Graphelysia
- Hecatesia
- Hemituerta
- Heraclia
- Hespagarista
- Heterandra
- Hoplarista
- Hortonius
- Hypotuerta
- Idalima
- Immetalia
- Ipanica
- Laquea
- Leiosoma
- Leonides
- Letaba
- Leucogonia
- Leucosemia
- Leucovis
- Longicella
- Lophonotidia
- Maikona
- Massaga
- Melanchroiopsis
- Metagarista
- Metaxanthiella
- Mimeusemia
- Misa
- Mitrophrys
- Musurgina
- Mystrocephala
- Neotuerta
- Nesaegocera
- Omphaloceps
- Ophthalmis
- Orthia
- Ovios
- Oxythaphora
- Paida
- Pais
- Paraegocera
- Pararothia
- Paratuerta
- Parothria
- Pemphigostola
- Periopta
- Periscepta
- Phalaenoides
- Phasidia
- Philippodamias
- Pimprana
- Platagarista
- Polacanthopoda
- Pristoceraea
- Prostheta
- Pseudagoma
- Pseudalypia
- Pseudopais
- Pseudospiris
- Pseudotuerta
- Psychomorpha
- Pycnodontis
- Radinocera
- Rhosus
- Rothia
- Saigonita
- Sarbanissa
- Sarbissa
- Schalifrontia
- Schausia
- Schausilla
- Scrobigera
- Seirocastnia
- Sergiusia
- Seudyra
- Shapis
- Spectronissa
- Syfania
- Syfanoidea
- Tuerta
- Tuertella
- Vespola
- Weymeria
- Xanthospilopteryx
- Xerociris
- Zalissa
