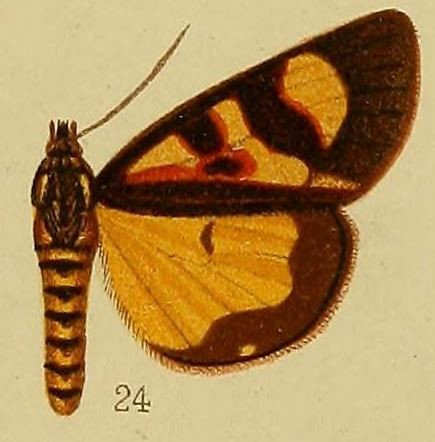
- Hoplarista haemaplaga

Scientific classification
- Kingdom: Animalia
- Phylum: Arthropoda
- Class: Insecta
- Order: Lepidoptera
- Superfamily: Noctuoidea
- Family: Noctuidae
- Subfamily: Agaristinae
- Genus: Hoplarista; Hampson, 1910
- Species: H. haemaplaga

Binomial name
- Hoplarista haemaplaga Hampson, 1910

= Hoplarista =

Genus of moths

Hoplarista is a monotypic moth genus of the family Noctuidae. Its only species, Hoplarista haemaplaga, is found in Zambia. Both the genus and species were first described by George Hampson in 1910.

The Global Lepidoptera Names Index gives this name as a synonym of Paida Jordan, 1896.
