= Paraegocera =

Scientific classification
- Kingdom: Animalia
- Phylum: Arthropoda
- Class: Insecta
- Order: Lepidoptera
- Superfamily: Noctuoidea
- Family: Noctuidae
- Subfamily: Agaristinae
- Genus: Paraegocera; Hampson, 1901

Genus of moths

Paraegocera is a genus of moths of the family Noctuidae. The genus was erected by George Hampson in 1901.

The Global Lepidoptera Names Index gives this name as a synonym of Schausia Karsch, 1895.

== Species ==
- Paraegocera confluens Weymer, 1892
- Paraegocera variata Candéze, 1927
