= Pseudotuerta =

Scientific classification
- Kingdom: Animalia
- Phylum: Arthropoda
- Class: Insecta
- Order: Lepidoptera
- Superfamily: Noctuoidea
- Family: Noctuidae
- Subfamily: Agaristinae
- Genus: Pseudotuerta; Kiriakoff, 1977
- Species: P. argyrochlora

Binomial name
- Pseudotuerta argyrochlora (Carcasson, 1964)

Synonyms
- Tuerta argyrochlora Carcasson, 1964

Single-species genus of moths

Pseudotuerta is a monotypic genus of moths belonging to the Noctuidae family erected by Sergius G. Kiriakoff in 1977. Its only species, Pseudotuerta argyrochlora, was first described by Robert Herbert Carcasson in 1964. It is found in the Democratic Republic of the Congo, Rwanda and Uganda.
