= Cyanohypsa =

Scientific classification
- Domain: Eukaryota
- Kingdom: Animalia
- Phylum: Arthropoda
- Class: Insecta
- Order: Lepidoptera
- Superfamily: Noctuoidea
- Family: Noctuidae
- Subfamily: Agaristinae
- Genus: Cyanohypsa; Giacomelli, 1911
- Species: C. stefanellii

Binomial name
- Cyanohypsa stefanellii Giacomelli, 1911

Genus of moths

Cyanohypsa is a genus of moths in the family Noctuidae. It contains the single species Cyanohypsa stefanellii, which is found in Argentina. Both the genus and species were first described by Eugenio Giacomelli in 1911; it was historically misclassified, but in 2010 was determined to belong to the subfamily Agaristinae.
