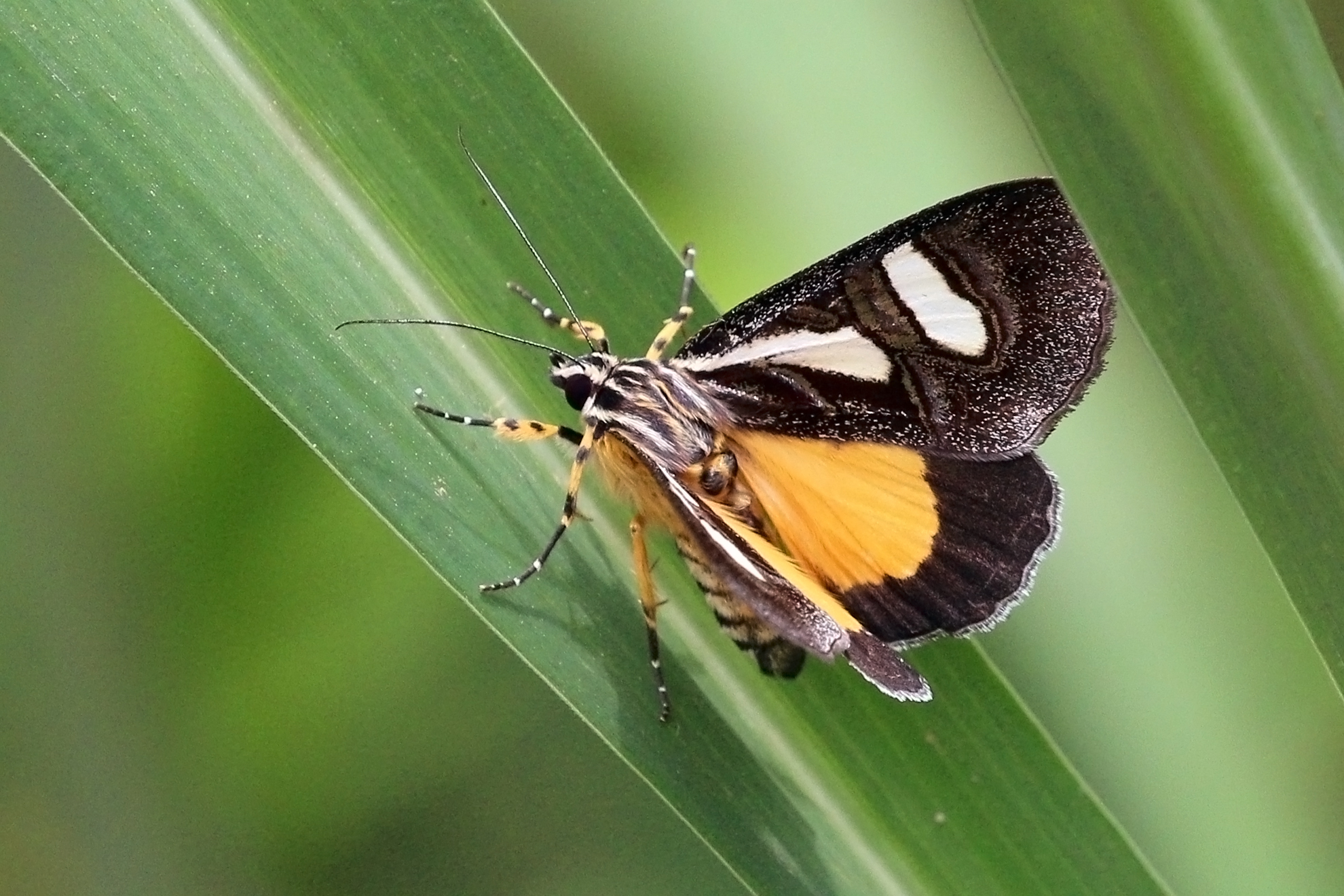
- Agoma trimenii in Ghana

Scientific classification
- Kingdom: Animalia
- Phylum: Arthropoda
- Clade: Pancrustacea
- Class: Insecta
- Order: Lepidoptera
- Superfamily: Noctuoidea
- Family: Noctuidae
- Subfamily: Agaristinae
- Genus: Agoma; Kiriakoff, 1977
- Species: A. trimenii

Binomial name
- Agoma trimenii (R. Felder, 1874)

Synonyms
- Aegocera trimenii R. Felder, 1874; Mitrophrys agoma Karsch, 1895; Agocera elegantula Mabille, 1893; Mitrophrys halans Karsch, 1895; Tuerta ovifera Hampson, 1910; Aegocera tricolor H. Druce, 1883

= Agoma =

Species of insect

Agoma is a monotypic genus of moths in the family Noctuidae erected by Sergius G. Kiriakoff in 1977. Its only species, Agoma trimenii, or Trimen's false tiger, was first described by Rudolf Felder in 1874. It is known from most countries of subtropical Africa.
