= Hemituerta =

Scientific classification
- Domain: Eukaryota
- Kingdom: Animalia
- Phylum: Arthropoda
- Class: Insecta
- Order: Lepidoptera
- Superfamily: Noctuoidea
- Family: Noctuidae
- Subfamily: Agaristinae
- Genus: Hemituerta; Kiriakoff, 1977

Genus of moths

Hemituerta is a genus of moths of the family Noctuidae. The genus was erected by Sergius G. Kiriakoff in 1977.

== Species ==
- Hemituerta mahdi Pagenstecher, 1903
- Hemituerta nana Hampson, 1916
