= Pristoceraea =

Scientific classification
- Domain: Eukaryota
- Kingdom: Animalia
- Phylum: Arthropoda
- Class: Insecta
- Order: Lepidoptera
- Superfamily: Noctuoidea
- Family: Noctuidae
- Subfamily: Agaristinae
- Genus: Pristoceraea; Karsch, 1895
- Species: P. eriopis

Binomial name
- Pristoceraea eriopis (Herrich-Schäffer, [1853])

Synonyms
- Generic: Eriopana Kiriakoff, 1974; Specific: Agarista eriopis Herrich-Schäffer, [1853]; Rothia eriopis ab. carminata Rothschild, 1896; Rothia eriopis; Ophthalmis eriopis; Hampson, 1901; Eriopana eriopis

Genus of moths

Pristoceraea is a monotypic moth genus of the family Noctuidae described by Ferdinand Karsch in 1895. Its only species, Pristoceraea eriopis, was first described by Gottlieb August Wilhelm Herrich-Schäffer in 1853. It is found on Madagascar.
