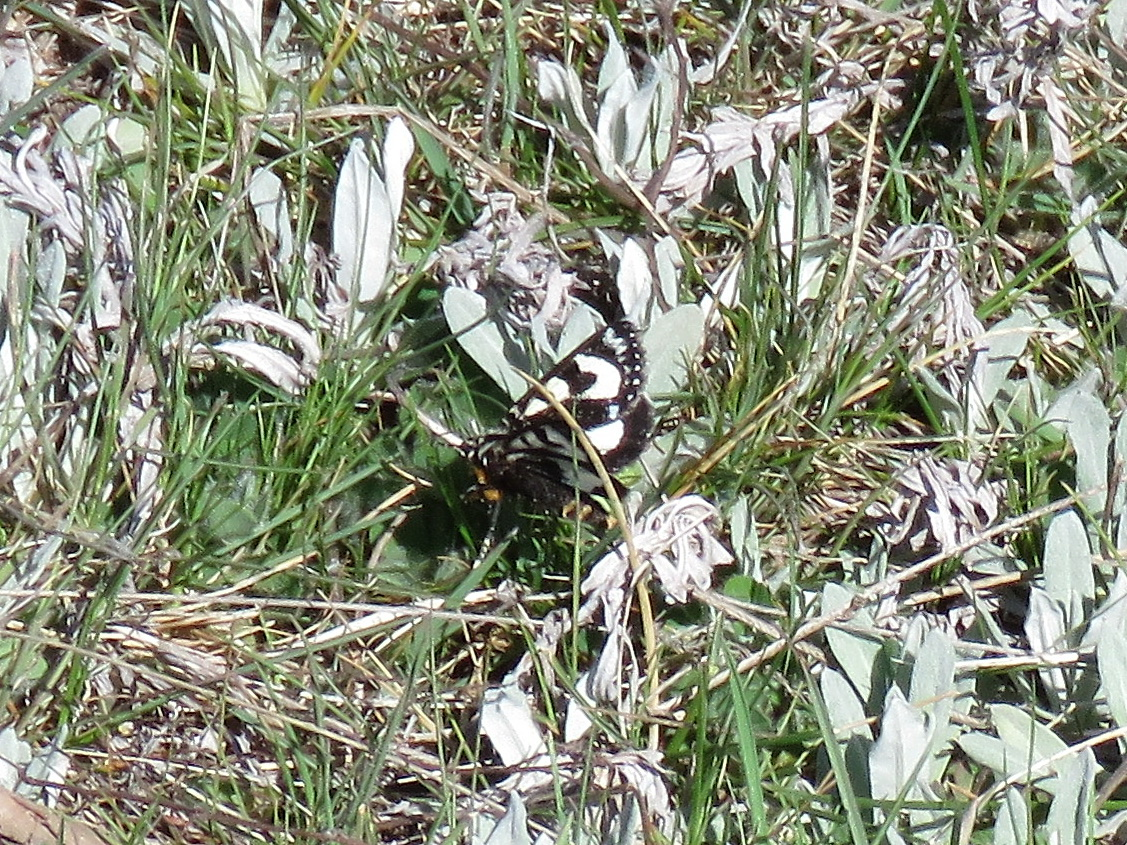
- Agaristodes feisthamelii

Scientific classification
- Kingdom: Animalia
- Phylum: Arthropoda
- Class: Insecta
- Order: Lepidoptera
- Superfamily: Noctuoidea
- Family: Noctuidae
- Subfamily: Agaristinae
- Genus: Agaristodes; Hampson, 1908
- Species: A. feisthamelii

Binomial name
- Agaristodes feisthamelii (Herrich-Schäffer, [1853])

Synonyms
- Agarista feisthamelii Herrich-Schäffer, [1853]

= Agaristodes =

Genus of moths

Agaristodes is a monotypic moth genus of the family Noctuidae erected by George Hampson in 1908. Its only species, Agaristodes feisthamelii, was first described by Gottlieb August Wilhelm Herrich-Schäffer in 1853. It is found in the Australian island state of Tasmania.
