= Periopta =

Scientific classification
- Domain: Eukaryota
- Kingdom: Animalia
- Phylum: Arthropoda
- Class: Insecta
- Order: Lepidoptera
- Superfamily: Noctuoidea
- Family: Noctuidae
- Subfamily: Agaristinae
- Genus: Periopta; Turner, 1920

Genus of moths

Periopta is a genus of moths of the family Noctuidae. The genus was described by Turner in 1920.

== Species ==
- Periopta ardescens Butler, 1884
- Periopta diversa Walker, [1865]
