= Apaegocera =

Scientific classification
- Kingdom: Animalia
- Phylum: Arthropoda
- Class: Insecta
- Order: Lepidoptera
- Superfamily: Noctuoidea
- Family: Noctuidae
- Subfamily: Agaristinae
- Genus: Apaegocera; Hampson, 1905

Genus of moths

Apaegocera is a genus of moths of the family Noctuidae. The genus was erected by George Hampson in 1905.

== Species ==
- Apaegocera argyrogramma Hampson, 1905
- Apaegocera aurantipennis Hampson, 1912
