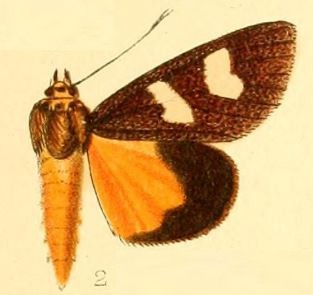
- Schausilla obrysos

Scientific classification
- Kingdom: Animalia
- Phylum: Arthropoda
- Class: Insecta
- Order: Lepidoptera
- Superfamily: Noctuoidea
- Family: Noctuidae
- Subfamily: Agaristinae
- Genus: Schausilla; Kiriakoff in Kiriakoff & Viette, 1974
- Species: S. obrysos

Binomial name
- Schausilla obrysos (Mabille, 1878)

Synonyms
- Aegocera obrysos Mabille, 1878

= Schausilla =

Genus of moths

Schausilla is a monotypic moth genus of the family Noctuidae erected by Sergius G. Kiriakoff in 1974. Its only species, Schausilla obrysos, was first described by Paul Mabille in 1878. It is found on Madagascar and the Comoros.
