= Mitrophrys =

Scientific classification
- Domain: Eukaryota
- Kingdom: Animalia
- Phylum: Arthropoda
- Class: Insecta
- Order: Lepidoptera
- Superfamily: Noctuoidea
- Family: Noctuidae
- Subfamily: Agaristinae
- Genus: Mitrophrys; Karsch, 1895

Genus of moths

Mitrophrys is a genus of moths of the family Noctuidae. The genus was erected by Ferdinand Karsch in 1895.

== Species ==
- Mitrophrys ansorgei Rothschild, 1897
- Mitrophrys barnsi Joicey & Talbot, 1921
- Mitrophrys gynandra Jordan, 1913
- Mitrophrys kenyamagaribae Stoneham, 1963
- Mitrophrys latreillii Herrich-Schäffer, [1853]
- Mitrophrys magna Walker, 1854
- Mitrophrys menete Cramer, [1775]
