= Ovios =

Scientific classification
- Kingdom: Animalia
- Phylum: Arthropoda
- Class: Insecta
- Order: Lepidoptera
- Superfamily: Noctuoidea
- Family: Noctuidae
- Subfamily: Agaristinae
- Genus: Ovios; Walker, 1855

Genus of moths

Ovios is a genus of moths of the family Noctuidae. The genus was erected by Francis Walker in 1855.

== Species ==
- Ovios capensis Herrich-Schäffer, [1854]
- Ovios nealces Fawcet, 1915
