= Exsula =

Scientific classification
- Domain: Eukaryota
- Kingdom: Animalia
- Phylum: Arthropoda
- Class: Insecta
- Order: Lepidoptera
- Superfamily: Noctuoidea
- Family: Noctuidae
- Subfamily: Agaristinae
- Genus: Exsula; Jordan in Rothschild & Jordan, 1896

Genus of moths

Exsula is a genus of moths of the family Noctuidae.

== Species ==
- Exsula burmaensis Strand, 1912
- Exsula dentatrix Westwood, 1848
- Exsula victrix Westwood, 1848
