= Charitosemia =

Scientific classification
- Domain: Eukaryota
- Kingdom: Animalia
- Phylum: Arthropoda
- Class: Insecta
- Order: Lepidoptera
- Superfamily: Noctuoidea
- Family: Noctuidae
- Subfamily: Agaristinae
- Genus: Charitosemia; Kiriakoff, 1955

Genus of moths

Charitosemia is a genus of moths of the family Noctuidae.

== Species ==
- Charitosemia albigutta Karsch, 1895
- Charitosemia geraldi Kirby, 1896
