= Andrhippuris =

Scientific classification
- Domain: Eukaryota
- Kingdom: Animalia
- Phylum: Arthropoda
- Class: Insecta
- Order: Lepidoptera
- Superfamily: Noctuoidea
- Family: Noctuidae
- Subfamily: Agaristinae
- Genus: Andrhippuris; Karsch, 1895
- Species: A. caudaequina

Binomial name
- Andrhippuris caudaequina Karsch, 1895

Genus of moths

Andrhippuris is a monotypic moth genus of the family Noctuidae. Its only species, Andrhippuris caudaequina, is found in the Democratic Republic of the Congo, Guinea and Zambia. Both the genus and species were first described by Ferdinand Karsch in 1895.
