= Letaba =

Scientific classification
- Kingdom: Animalia
- Phylum: Arthropoda
- Class: Insecta
- Order: Lepidoptera
- Superfamily: Noctuoidea
- Family: Noctuidae
- Subfamily: Agaristinae
- Genus: Letaba; Dyar, 1912
- Species: L. noa

Binomial name
- Letaba noa Dyar, 1912

Genus of moths

Letaba is a monotypic moth genus of the family Noctuidae. Its only species, Letaba noa, is found in Mexico. Both the genus and species were first described by Harrison Gray Dyar Jr. in 1912.
