= Crinocula =

Scientific classification
- Domain: Eukaryota
- Kingdom: Animalia
- Phylum: Arthropoda
- Class: Insecta
- Order: Lepidoptera
- Superfamily: Noctuoidea
- Family: Noctuidae
- Subfamily: Agaristinae
- Genus: Crinocula; Jordan in Rothschild & Jordan, 1896
- Species: C. kinabaluensis

Binomial name
- Crinocula kinabaluensis Rothschild, 1896

Synonyms
- Crinocula cinabaluensis Hampson, 1901

Genus of moths

Crinocula is a monotypic moth genus of the family Noctuidae erected by Karl Jordan in 1896. Its only species, Crinocula kinabaluensis, was first described by Walter Rothschild in 1896. It is found in Borneo.
