= Caularisia =

Scientific classification
- Domain: Eukaryota
- Kingdom: Animalia
- Phylum: Arthropoda
- Class: Insecta
- Order: Lepidoptera
- Superfamily: Noctuoidea
- Family: Noctuidae
- Subfamily: Agaristinae
- Genus: Caularisia; Becker, 2010
- Species: C. zikani

Binomial name
- Caularisia zikani (Schaus, 1933)

Synonyms
- Caularis zikani Schaus, 1933

Genus of moth

Caularisia is a genus of moths of the family Noctuidae, containing only a single species, Caularisia zikani, from Brazil.
