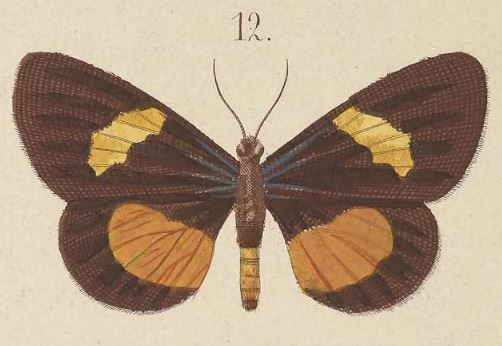

Scientific classification
- Kingdom: Animalia
- Phylum: Arthropoda
- Class: Insecta
- Order: Lepidoptera
- Superfamily: Noctuoidea
- Family: Noctuidae
- Genus: Immetalia
- Species: I. saturata

Binomial name
- Immetalia saturata (Walker, [1865])

Synonyms
- Eusemia saturata Walker 1865; Eusemia longipalpis Kirsch, 1877; Agarista doleschallii Felder, 1874; Agarista tyrianthina Butler, 1879; Agarista bruijni Oberthür, 1880; Eusemia doreana Swinhoe, 1892; Agarista prochyta Druce, 1894; Agarista cynapes Druce, 1894; Immetalia meeki Rothschild, 1896; Immetalia diversa Rothschild & Jordan, 1903

= Immetalia saturata =

Species of moth

Immetalia saturata is a species of moth of the family Noctuidae. It is found in New Guinea and Papua New Guinea.

This species is very variable in coloration.
