= Darceta =

Scientific classification
- Domain: Eukaryota
- Kingdom: Animalia
- Phylum: Arthropoda
- Class: Insecta
- Order: Lepidoptera
- Superfamily: Noctuoidea
- Family: Noctuidae
- Subfamily: Agaristinae
- Genus: Darceta; Herrich-Schäffer, [1856]

Synonyms
- Clitis Walker, 1858; Diamuna Walker, 1858

Genus of moths

Darceta is a genus of moths of the family Noctuidae.

== Species ==
- Darceta falcata Druce, 1883
- Darceta grandimacula Schaus, 1921
- Darceta haenschi Dohrn, 1906
- Darceta ophideres Draudt, 1919
- Darceta primulina Druce, 1889
- Darceta proserpina Stoll, [1782]
- Darceta severa Stoll, [1782]
