= Melanchroiopsis =

Scientific classification
- Kingdom: Animalia
- Phylum: Arthropoda
- Class: Insecta
- Order: Lepidoptera
- Superfamily: Noctuoidea
- Family: Noctuidae
- Subfamily: Agaristinae
- Genus: Melanchroiopsis; Dyar, 1918

Synonyms
- Phasis Walker, 1854 (preocc.); Shapis Nye, 1975

Genus of moths

Melanchroiopsis is a genus of moths of the family Noctuidae. The genus was erected by Harrison Gray Dyar Jr. in 1918.

== Species ==
- Melanchroiopsis acroleuca Dyar, 1918
- Melanchroiopsis mardava Druce, 1897
- Melanchroiopsis noctilux Walker, 1854
