= Metagarista =

Scientific classification
- Kingdom: Animalia
- Phylum: Arthropoda
- Class: Insecta
- Order: Lepidoptera
- Superfamily: Noctuoidea
- Family: Noctuidae
- Subfamily: Agaristinae
- Genus: Metagarista; Walker, 1854

Genus of moths

Metagarista is a genus of moths of the family Noctuidae. The genus was erected by Francis Walker in 1854.

== Species ==
- Metagarista aziyade Vuillot, 1892
- Metagarista maenas Herrich-Schäffer, [1853]
- Metagarista subcrocea Wiltshire, 1983
- Metagarista triphaenoides Walker, 1854
