= Pemphigostola =

Scientific classification
- Domain: Eukaryota
- Kingdom: Animalia
- Phylum: Arthropoda
- Class: Insecta
- Order: Lepidoptera
- Superfamily: Noctuoidea
- Family: Noctuidae
- Subfamily: Agaristinae
- Genus: Pemphigostola; Strand, 1909
- Species: P. synemonistis

Binomial name
- Pemphigostola synemonistis Strand, 1909

Genus of moths

Pemphigostola is a monotypic moth genus of the family Noctuidae. Its only species, Pemphigostola synemonistis, is found in Madagascar. Both the genus and species were first described by Strand in 1909.
