= Godasa =

Scientific classification
- Kingdom: Animalia
- Phylum: Arthropoda
- Class: Insecta
- Order: Lepidoptera
- Superfamily: Noctuoidea
- Family: Noctuidae
- Subfamily: Agaristinae
- Genus: Godasa; Walker, [1865]
- Species: G. sidae

Binomial name
- Godasa sidae (Fabricius, 1794)

Synonyms
- Noctua sidae Fabricius, 1794; Aganais mecynoides Mabille, 1880

Genus of moths

Godasa is a monotypic moth genus of the family Noctuidae erected by Francis Walker in 1865. Its only species, Godasa sidae, was first described by Johan Christian Fabricius in 1794. It is found in Cameroon, the Democratic Republic of the Congo, Equatorial Guinea, the Gambia, Ghana, Guinea, Madagascar, Nigeria, Sierra Leone and Tanzania.
