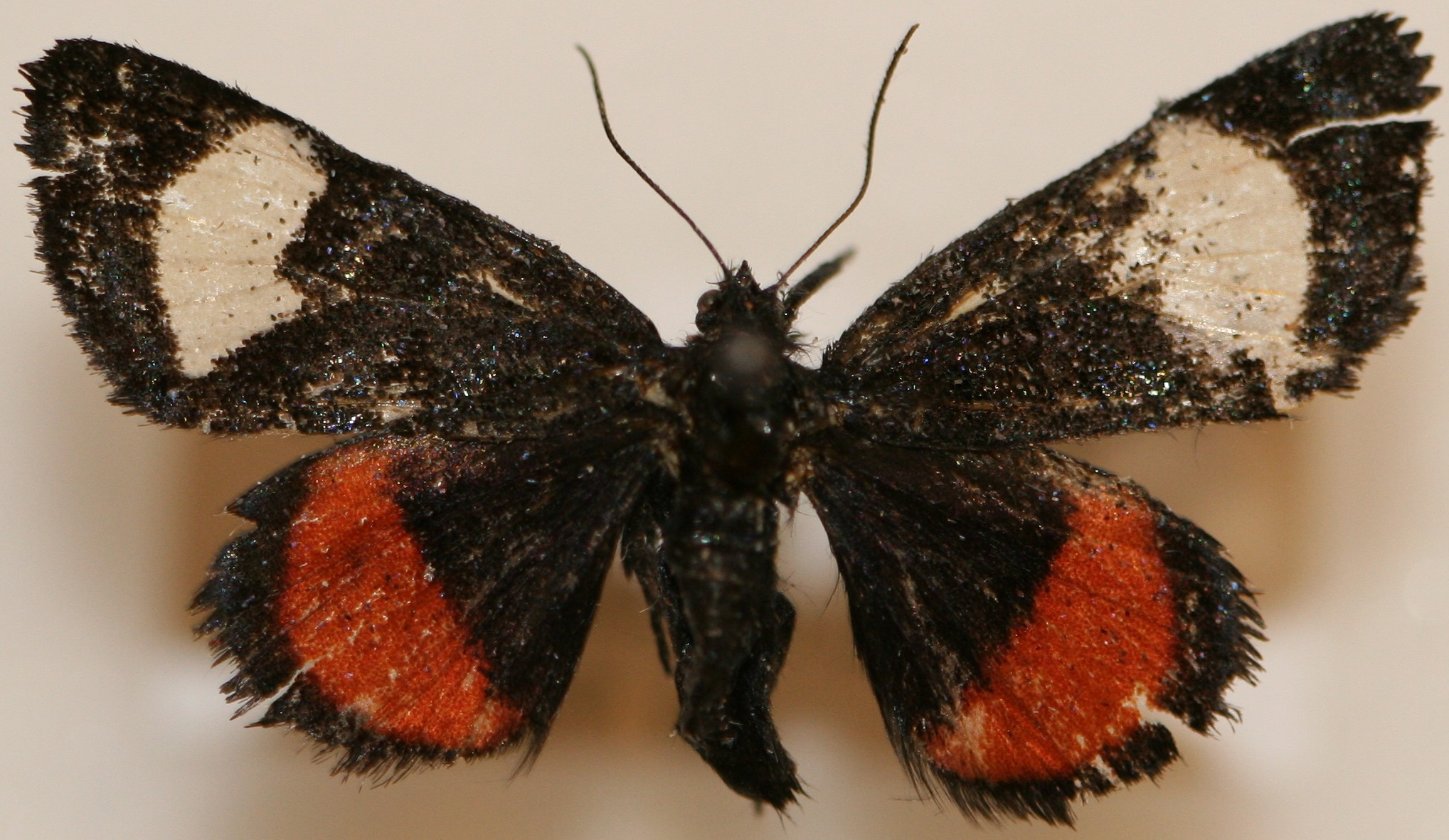
- Psychomorpha epimenis

Scientific classification
- Kingdom: Animalia
- Phylum: Arthropoda
- Clade: Pancrustacea
- Class: Insecta
- Order: Lepidoptera
- Superfamily: Noctuoidea
- Family: Noctuidae
- Subfamily: Agaristinae
- Genus: Psychomorpha; Harris, 1839
- Species: P. epimenis

Binomial name
- Psychomorpha epimenis (Drury, 1782)

Synonyms
- Psychomorpha euryrhoda Hampson, 1910

= Psychomorpha =

Grapevine epimenis

Genus of moths

Psychomorpha is a monotypic genus of moths in the family Noctuidae erected by Thaddeus William Harris in 1839. Its only species, Psychomorpha epimenis, the grapevine epimenis, was first described by Dru Drury in 1782. It is found in eastern North America as far west as the Oklahoma Panhandle.

== Description ==
The wings and body are black with a large white forewing patch and a red hindwing patch. The wingspan ranges from 2.2 to 2.7 cm.

== Subspecies ==
- Psychomorpha epimenis epimenis
- Psychomorpha epimenis euryrhoda (Florida) - has a red hindwing patch that stretches almost to the base of the wing

== Habitat ==
This moth may be encountered in woodlands, woodland edges, and hedgerows.

== Flight ==
The grapevine epimenis is a spring moth which may be found from March to early May.

== Life cycle ==
The larva is black with transverse white stripes. The head, part of the thorax, the area near the end of the abdomen, and the prolegs are a reddish orange. The larva makes a leaf shelter in new foliage by taking the leaf edges and pulling them upward and then tying them together with silk. The pupa hibernates in wood or dense peat. It has one brood per year.

== Host plants ==
Host plants include:

- Summer grapevine, Vitis aestivalis
- Fox grapevine, Vitis labrusca
- Riverbank grapevine, Vitis riparia
- Frost grapevine, Vitis vulpina
