= Sarbissa =

Scientific classification
- Domain: Eukaryota
- Kingdom: Animalia
- Phylum: Arthropoda
- Class: Insecta
- Order: Lepidoptera
- Superfamily: Noctuoidea
- Family: Noctuidae
- Subfamily: Agaristinae
- Genus: Sarbissa; Kiriakoff, 1977
- Species: S. bostrychonota

Binomial name
- Sarbissa bostrychonota (Tams, 1929)

Synonyms
- Seuryda bostrychonota Tams, 1929

Genus of moths

Sarbissa is a monotypic moth genus of the family Noctuidae erected by Sergius G. Kiriakoff in 1977. Its only species, Sarbissa bostrychonota, was first described by Tams in 1929. It is found on Fiji.
