= Leucovis =

Scientific classification
- Kingdom: Animalia
- Phylum: Arthropoda
- Class: Insecta
- Order: Lepidoptera
- Superfamily: Noctuoidea
- Family: Noctuidae
- Subfamily: Agaristinae
- Genus: Leucovis; Hampson, 1908

Synonyms
- Perimagia Strand, 1909

Genus of moths

Leucovis is a genus of moths of the family Noctuidae. The genus was erected by George Hampson in 1908.

== Species ==
- Leucovis alba Rothschild, 1897
- Leucovis lepta Fawcett, 1917
