= Arpia =

Scientific classification
- Domain: Eukaryota
- Kingdom: Animalia
- Phylum: Arthropoda
- Class: Insecta
- Order: Lepidoptera
- Superfamily: Noctuoidea
- Family: Noctuidae
- Subfamily: Agaristinae
- Genus: Arpia; Schaus, 1896
- Species: A. janeira

Binomial name
- Arpia janeira Schaus, 1896

Synonyms
- Copidryas marginalis Rothschild, 1897

Genus of moths

Arpia is a monotypic moth genus of the family Noctuidae. Its only species, Arpia janeira, is found in the Brazilian states of Rio de Janeiro and Espírito Santo. Both the genus and species were first described by William Schaus in 1896.
