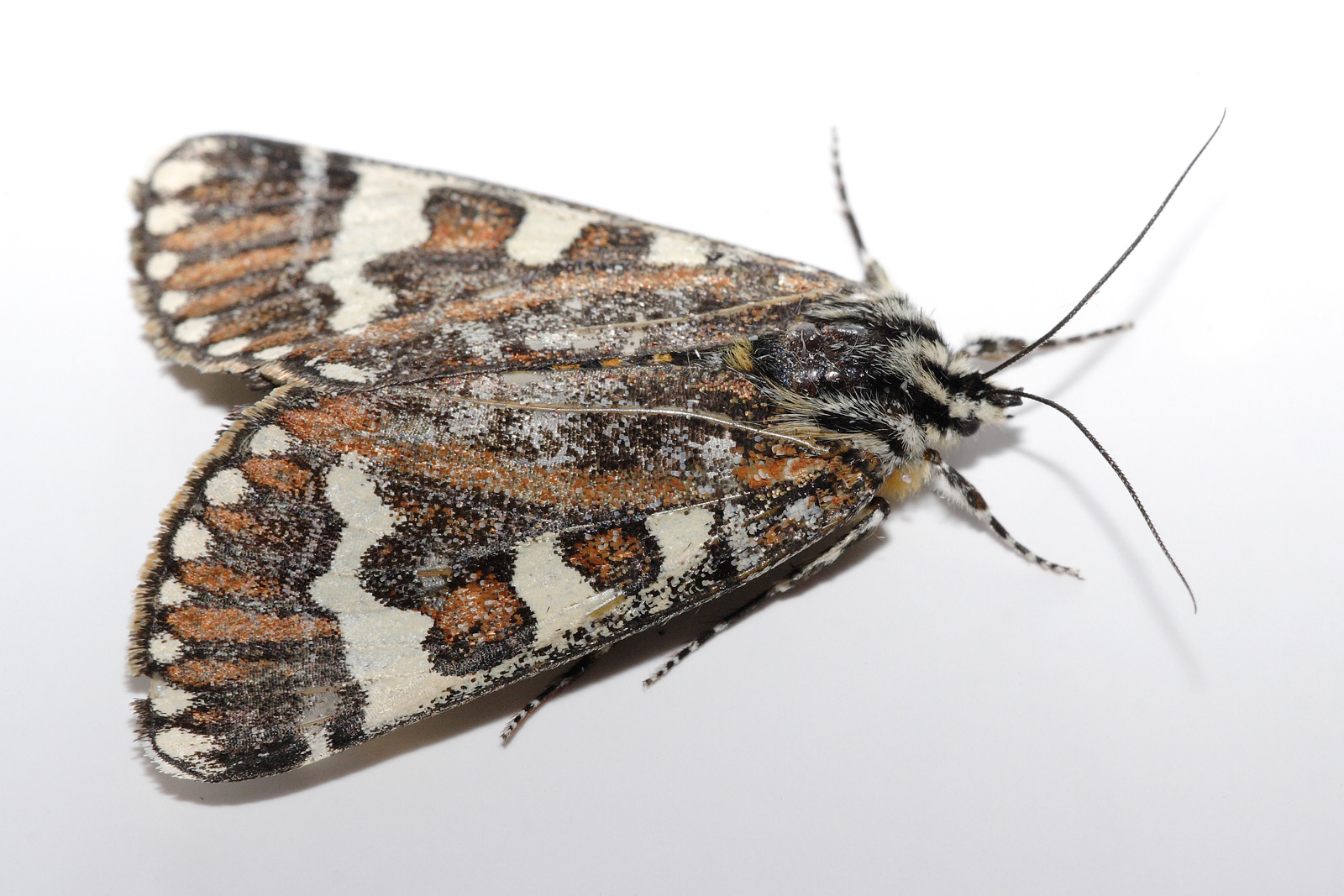
- Apina callisto

Scientific classification
- Kingdom: Animalia
- Phylum: Arthropoda
- Class: Insecta
- Order: Lepidoptera
- Superfamily: Noctuoidea
- Family: Noctuidae
- Subfamily: Agaristinae
- Genus: Apina; Walker, 1855
- Species: A. callisto

Binomial name
- Apina callisto Angas, 1847

Synonyms
- Generic: Amazela Boisduval, 1874; Specific: Agarista callisto Angas, 1847; Amazela calisto Boisduval, 1874

= Pasture day moth =

Species of moth

The pasture day moth (Apina callisto) is a species in the moth family Noctuidae which is active during the day, as its common name implies, making it unlike most other noctuid species. It is found in most southern areas of Australia, ranging from lower Queensland to Tasmania. The species was first described by George French Angas in 1847. It is the only species in the monotypic genus Apina, erected by Francis Walker in 1855.

The pasture day moth lays its eggs in pastures, and they hatch after heavy rains in early spring. When the larvae are fully grown, measuring about 60 mm (2.4 in), they burrow down before becoming pupae. They have striking coloration; two yellow stripes run down their mottled-black back, interspersed with blue spots. Their bodies are covered with white spines. They feed on various broad leaved plants (see list below).

The adult moth's wings are black with cream and chestnut markings, with a wingspan of approximately 50 mm (2.0 in). Its thorax is black and the abdomen is orange, ringed with black.

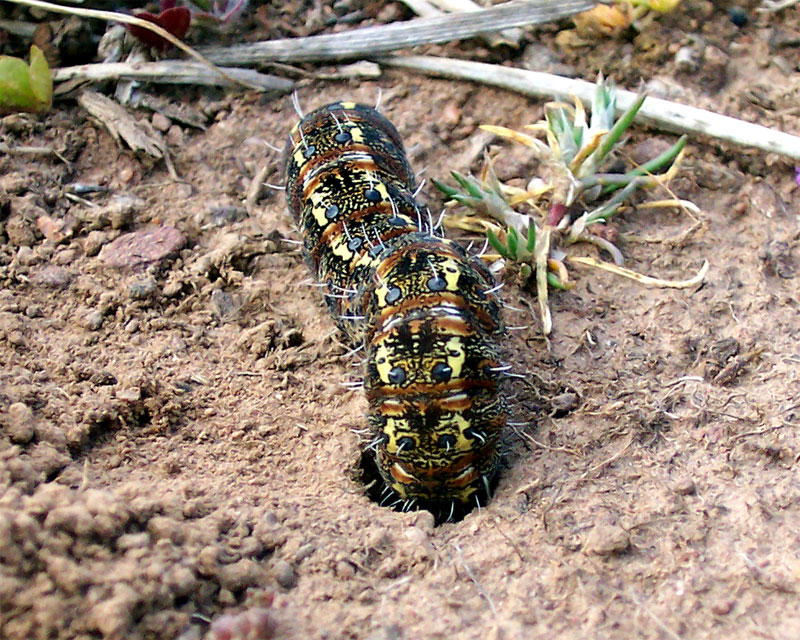
Larva entering hole to become pupa

== Recorded food plants ==
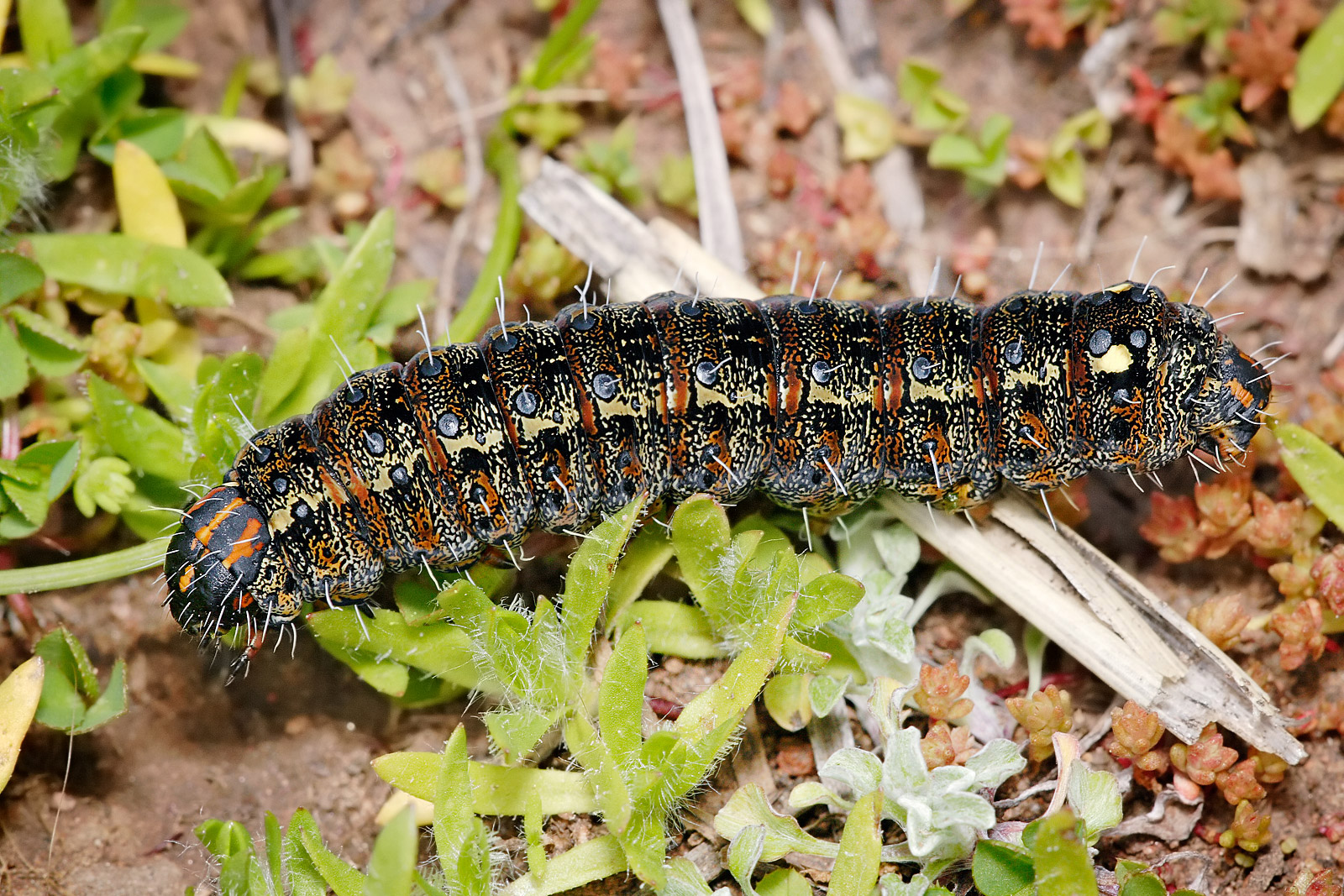
Pasture day moth caterpillar amongst tender capeweed leaves

- Arctotheca - capeweed
- Erodium - storksbill
- Lepidium
- Malva - mallow
- Modiola - bristle mallow
- Plantago - plantain
- Poaceae - grasses (including Paspalum)
- Rumex
- Salvia - sage
- Sonchus - sow-thistle
- Trifolium - clover
