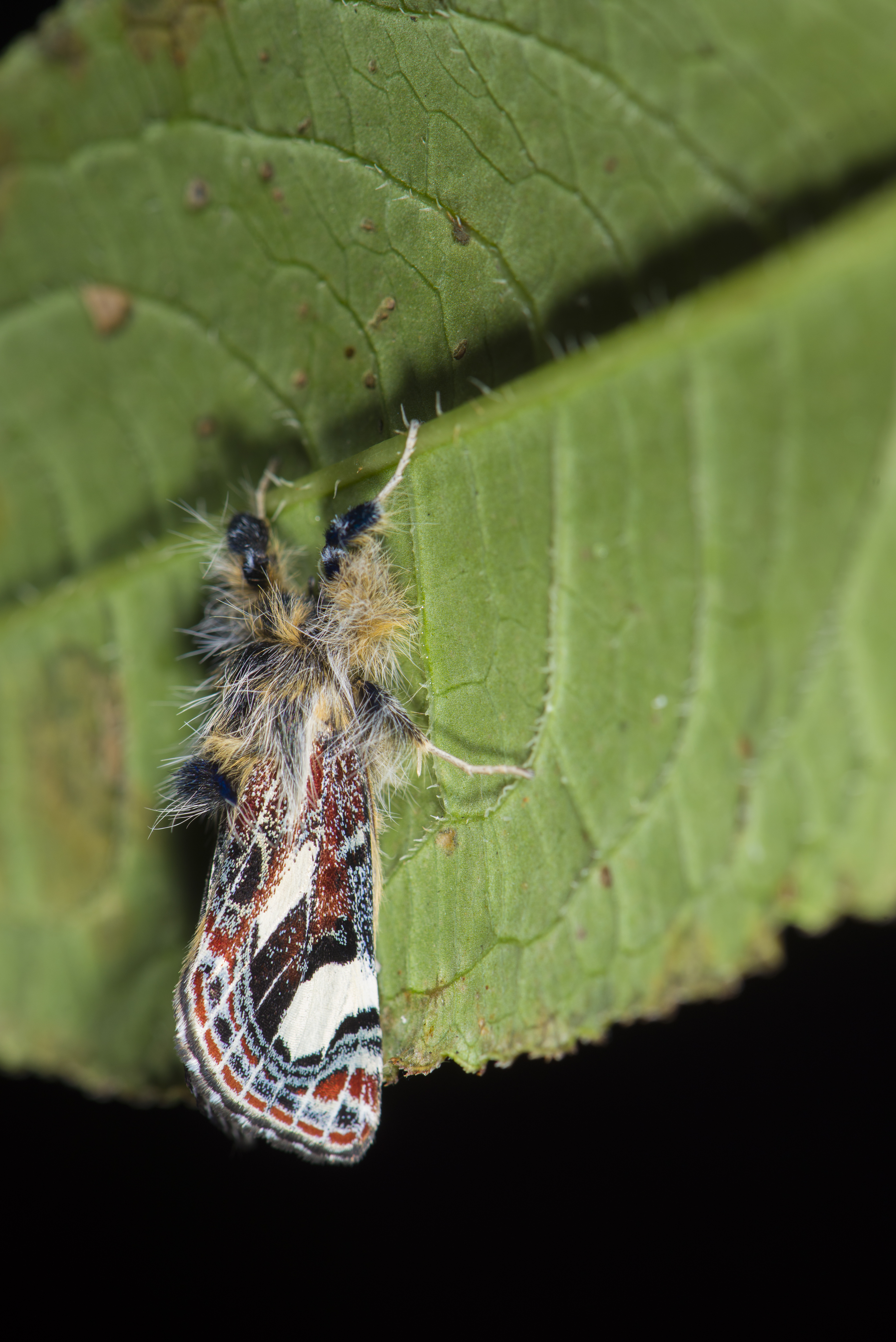
- Maikona yazakii

Scientific classification
- Domain: Eukaryota
- Kingdom: Animalia
- Phylum: Arthropoda
- Class: Insecta
- Order: Lepidoptera
- Superfamily: Noctuoidea
- Family: Noctuidae
- Subfamily: Agaristinae
- Genus: Maikona; Matsumura, 1928

= Maikona =

Genus of moths

Maikona is a genus of moths of the family Noctuidae erected by Shōnen Matsumura in 1928.

== Species ==
- Maikona jezoensis Matsumura, 1928 Japan
- Maikona nanlingensis Owada & Wang, 2003 Guangdong
- Maikona yazakii Kishida, 1987 Taiwan
