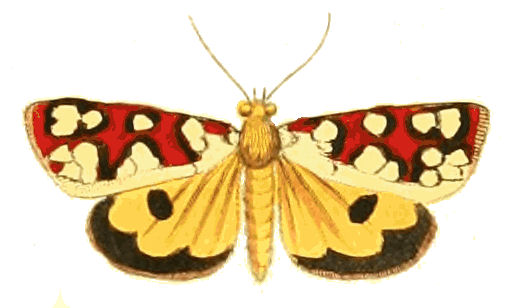

Scientific classification
- Domain: Eukaryota
- Kingdom: Animalia
- Phylum: Arthropoda
- Class: Insecta
- Order: Lepidoptera
- Superfamily: Noctuoidea
- Family: Noctuidae
- Subfamily: Agaristinae
- Genus: Crameria; Hübner, [1819]
- Species: C. amabilis

Binomial name
- Crameria amabilis (Drury, 1773)

Synonyms
- Generic: Charilina Walker, 1854; Specific: Phalaena amabilis Drury, 1773; Charilina amabilis ab. abyssinica Strand, 1912; Charilina amabilis ab. accra Strand, 1912; Noctua alienata Fabricius, 1794; Charilina intercisa Felder, 1874; Charilina istsariensis Stoneham, 1963; Charilina amabilis ab. nyassica Strand, 1912

= Crameria amabilis =

Species of moth

Crameria is a monotypic moth genus in the family Noctuidae erected by Jacob Hübner in 1819. Its only species, Crameria amabilis, was first described by Dru Drury in 1773.

== Description ==
Upperside: head brown. Antennae filiform. Thorax and abdomen yellow brown. Superior wings fine darkish red, with several yellow spots thereon of different shapes, each encircled with black; the posterior and external edges having yellow margins. Posterior wings deep yellow, inclining to orange, with a black oval spot near the middle of each. Along the external edges is a black margin, reaching from the upper to the abdominal corners; the upper edge being scalloped.

Underside: legs, sides, thorax, and abdomen pale orange. Anterior wings entirely pale orange and dusky black, without any mixture of red, etc. Posterior wings as on the upperside; the colours being less distinct. Margins of the wings entire.

Wingspan 1 1/2 inches (38 mm).

== Distribution ==
It is found in Angola, Benin, Burundi, Cameroon, the Democratic Republic of the Congo, Eritrea, Ethiopia, Gabon, Ghana, Ivory Coast, Kenya, Malawi, Mali, Nigeria, Rwanda, Senegal, Sierra Leone, South Africa, Sudan, Tanzania, the Gambia, Uganda, Zambia and Zimbabwe.
