= Philippodamias =

Scientific classification
- Kingdom: Animalia
- Phylum: Arthropoda
- Clade: Pancrustacea
- Class: Insecta
- Order: Lepidoptera
- Superfamily: Noctuoidea
- Family: Noctuidae
- Subfamily: Agaristinae
- Genus: Philippodamias; Clench, 1958
- Species: P. jocelyna

Binomial name
- Philippodamias jocelyna Clench, 1958

Genus of moths

Philippodamias is a monotypic moth genus of the family Noctuidae. Its only species, Philippodamias jocelyna, is found in the Philippines. Both the genus and species were first described by Harry Kendon Clench in 1958.
