= Leucogonia =

Scientific classification
- Kingdom: Animalia
- Phylum: Arthropoda
- Class: Insecta
- Order: Lepidoptera
- Superfamily: Noctuoidea
- Family: Noctuidae
- Subfamily: Agaristinae
- Genus: Leucogonia; Hampson, 1908

Synonyms
- Metaxanthia Hampson, 1908 (preocc.); Metaxanthiella Collins, 1962

Genus of moths

Leucogonia is a genus of moths of the family Noctuidae. The genus was erected by George Hampson in 1908.

== Species ==
- Leucogonia amarginata Holloway, 1979
- Leucogonia cosmopis Lower, 1897
- Leucogonia ekeikei Bethune-Baker, 1906
- Leucogonia kebeensis Bethune-Baker, 1906
