= Graphelysia =

Scientific classification
- Kingdom: Animalia
- Phylum: Arthropoda
- Class: Insecta
- Order: Lepidoptera
- Superfamily: Noctuoidea
- Family: Noctuidae
- Subfamily: Agaristinae
- Genus: Graphelysia; Hampson, 1911
- Species: G. strigillata

Binomial name
- Graphelysia strigillata Rothschild, 1910

Genus of moths

Graphelysia is a genus of moths in the family Noctuidae. It contains only one species, Graphelysia strigillata, which can be found in south-eastern Peru; it was historically misclassified on multiple occasions, but in 2010 was determined to belong to the subfamily Agaristinae.
