= Platagarista =

Scientific classification
- Domain: Eukaryota
- Kingdom: Animalia
- Phylum: Arthropoda
- Class: Insecta
- Order: Lepidoptera
- Superfamily: Noctuoidea
- Family: Noctuidae
- Subfamily: Agaristinae
- Genus: Platagarista; Jordan in Seitz, 1912
- Species: P. macleayi

Binomial name
- Platagarista macleayi (Macleay, 1864)

Synonyms
- Agarista macleayi Macleay, 1864; Agarista albamedia Lucas, 1891; Agarista tetrapleura Meyrick, 1891; Phalaenoides macleayi Swinhoe, 1892

Genus of moths

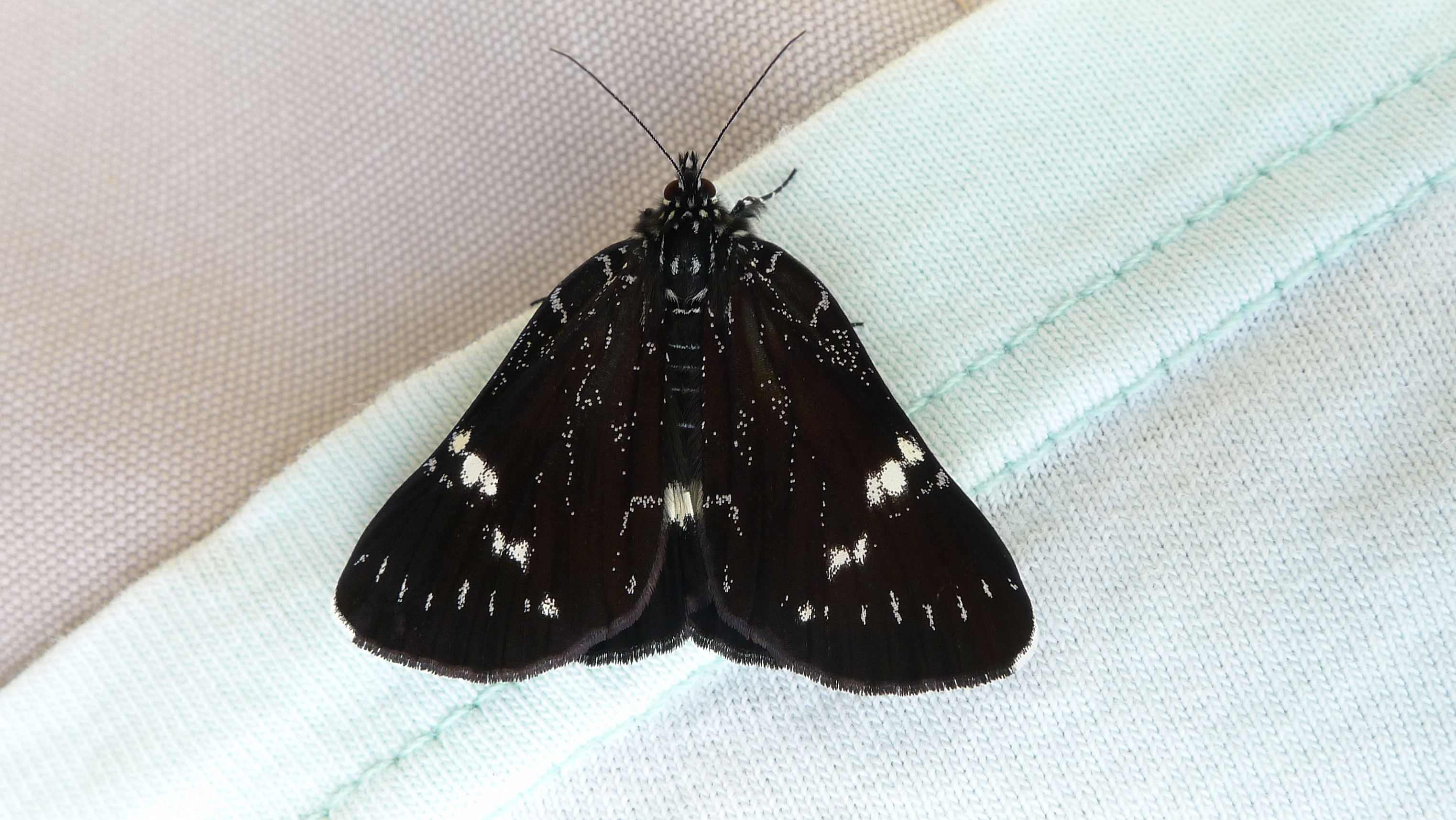

Platagarista is a monotypic moth genus of the family Noctuidae erected by Karl Jordan in 1912. Its only species, Platagarista macleayi, or Macleay's day-moth, was first described by William Sharp Macleay in 1864. It is found in the Australian states of Queensland and New South Wales.
