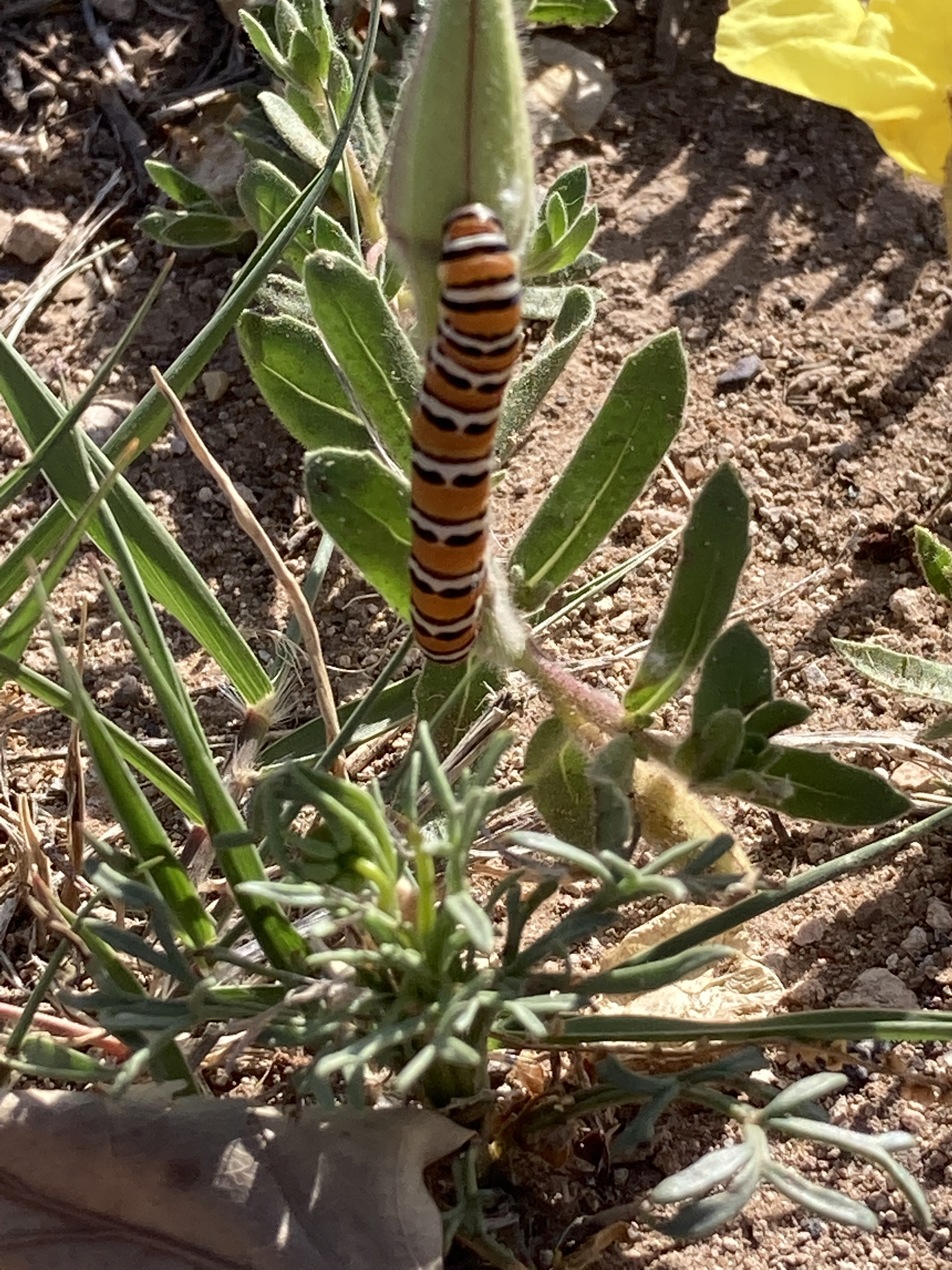
- Larva of Eupseudomorpha brillians feeding on Oenothera hartwegii

Scientific classification
- Kingdom: Animalia
- Phylum: Arthropoda
- Class: Insecta
- Order: Lepidoptera
- Superfamily: Noctuoidea
- Family: Noctuidae
- Subfamily: Agaristinae
- Genus: Eupseudomorpha; Dyar, 1893
- Species: E. brillians

Binomial name
- Eupseudomorpha brillians (Neumoegen, 1880)

Synonyms
- Generic: Edwardsia Neumoegen, 1880; Euedwardsia Kirby, 1892; Specific: Edwardsia brillians Neumoegen, 1880

= Eupseudomorpha =

Genus of moths

Eupseudomorpha is a monotypic moth genus of the family Noctuidae erected by Harrison Gray Dyar Jr. in 1893. Its only species, Eupseudomorpha brillians, was first described by Berthold Neumoegen in 1880. It is found in portions of New Mexico, Texas, and Oklahoma, in the Western Short Grasslands and Central and Southern Mixed Grasslands ecoregions. Caterpillars of the species appear to use members of the Onagraceae, particularly Oenothera (including Gaura), as a food source.
