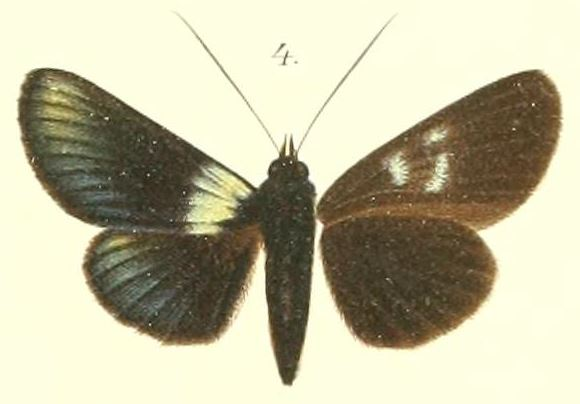
- Burgena chalybeata

Scientific classification
- Kingdom: Animalia
- Phylum: Arthropoda
- Class: Insecta
- Order: Lepidoptera
- Superfamily: Noctuoidea
- Family: Noctuidae
- Subfamily: Agaristinae
- Genus: Burgena; Walker, (1865)

= Burgena =

Genus of moths

Burgena is a genus of moths of the family Noctuidae.

== Species ==
There are 20 species within the genus Burgena. These are:

- Burgena amoena Rothschild, 1896
- Burgena anisa
- Burgena arruana
- Burgena baia
- Burgena chalybeata Rothschild, 1896
- Burgena constricta
- Burgena diserta
- Burgena dispar
- Burgena educta
- Burgena euxantha
- Burgena leucida
- Burgena luteistriga
- Burgena pectoralis
- Burgena ravida
- Burgena reducta
- Burgena rookensis
- Burgena splendida Butler, 1887
- Burgena transducta
- Burgena tripartita
- Burgena varia Walker, 1854
