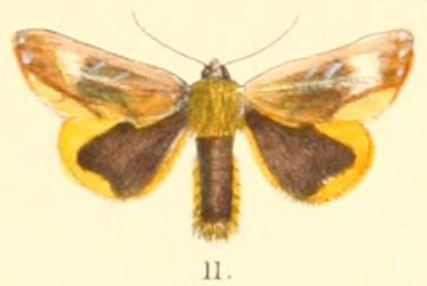
- Pimprana atkinsoni

Scientific classification
- Domain: Eukaryota
- Kingdom: Animalia
- Phylum: Arthropoda
- Class: Insecta
- Order: Lepidoptera
- Superfamily: Noctuoidea
- Family: Noctuidae
- Subfamily: Agaristinae
- Genus: Pimprana; Moore, 1879
- Species: P. atkinsoni

Binomial name
- Pimprana atkinsoni Moore, 1879

= Pimprana =

Genus of moths

Pimprana is a monotypic moth genus of the family Noctuidae. Its only species, Pimprana atkinsoni, is found in Darjeeling, India. Both the genus and species were first described by Frederic Moore in 1879.
