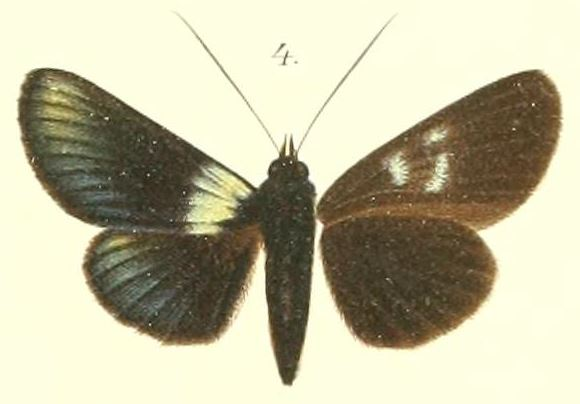

Scientific classification
- Domain: Eukaryota
- Kingdom: Animalia
- Phylum: Arthropoda
- Class: Insecta
- Order: Lepidoptera
- Superfamily: Noctuoidea
- Family: Noctuidae
- Genus: Burgena
- Species: B. chalybeata

Binomial name
- Burgena chalybeata Rothschild, 1896

Synonyms
- Burgena amoena Rothschild, 1896; Burgena diserta Jordan, 1926; Damias leucidia Jordan, 1912; Damias amoena rookensis Jordan, 1915; Damias rookensis

= Burgena chalybeata =

Species of moth

Burgena chalybeata is a moth of the family Noctuidae. It is found in New Britain.
