= Pseudagoma =

Scientific classification
- Domain: Eukaryota
- Kingdom: Animalia
- Phylum: Arthropoda
- Class: Insecta
- Order: Lepidoptera
- Superfamily: Noctuoidea
- Family: Noctuidae
- Subfamily: Agaristinae
- Genus: Pseudagoma; Kiriakoff, 1975
- Species: P. pinheyi

Binomial name
- Pseudagoma pinheyi Kiriakoff, 1975

Genus of moths

Pseudagoma is a monotypic moth genus of the family Noctuidae. Its only species, Pseudagoma pinheyi, is found in Mozambique. Both the genus and species were first described by Sergius G. Kiriakoff in 1975.
