= Depalpata =

Scientific classification
- Kingdom: Animalia
- Phylum: Arthropoda
- Clade: Pancrustacea
- Class: Insecta
- Order: Lepidoptera
- Superfamily: Noctuoidea
- Family: Noctuidae
- Subfamily: Agaristinae
- Genus: Depalpata; Rothschild, 1919

Genus of moths

Depalpata is a genus of moths of the family Noctuidae.

== Species ==
- Depalpata mirabilis Rothschild, 1919
- Depalpata pridgeoni Joicey & Talbot, 1922
