= Radinocera =

Scientific classification
- Kingdom: Animalia
- Phylum: Arthropoda
- Class: Insecta
- Order: Lepidoptera
- Superfamily: Noctuoidea
- Family: Noctuidae
- Subfamily: Agaristinae
- Genus: Radinocera; Hampson, 1908

Genus of moths

Radinocera is a genus of moths of the family Noctuidae. The genus was erected by George Hampson in 1908.

== Species ==
- Radinocera maculosus Rothschild, 1896
- Radinocera vagata Walker, 1865
