= Argyrolepidia =

Scientific classification
- Kingdom: Animalia
- Phylum: Arthropoda
- Class: Insecta
- Order: Lepidoptera
- Superfamily: Noctuoidea
- Family: Noctuidae
- Subfamily: Agaristinae
- Genus: Argyrolepidia; Hampson, 1901

Genus of moths

Argyrolepidia is a genus of moths of the family Noctuidae.

== Species ==
- Argyrolepidia aequalis (Walker, [1865])
- Argyrolepidia aethria Turner, 1908
- Argyrolepidia aurea Jordan, 1903
- Argyrolepidia comma Talbot, 1929
- Argyrolepidia concisa Jordan, 1912
- Argyrolepidia fracta (Rothschild, 1899)
- Argyrolepidia goldiei (Druce, 1894)
- Argyrolepidia inconspicua (Rothschild, 1896)
- Argyrolepidia lunaris Rothschild & Jordan, 1905
- Argyrolepidia megisto (Boisduval, 1832)
- Argyrolepidia mutans (Rothschild, 1901)
- Argyrolepidia novaehiberniae (Boisduval, 1832)
- Argyrolepidia palaea Rothschild, 1905
- Argyrolepidia pamphila (Stoll, [1781])
- Argyrolepidia resplendens (Rothschild & Jordan, 1903)
- Argyrolepidia restrictus (Rothschild, 1897)
- Argyrolepidia stevensi Jordan, 1938
- Argyrolepidia thoracophora (Turner, 1920)
- Argyrolepidia unimacula Lower, 1903
