= Cremnophora =

Scientific classification
- Kingdom: Animalia
- Phylum: Arthropoda
- Class: Insecta
- Order: Lepidoptera
- Superfamily: Noctuoidea
- Family: Noctuidae
- Subfamily: Agaristinae
- Genus: Cremnophora; Hampson, 1901
- Species: C. angasii

Binomial name
- Cremnophora angasii (Angas, 1847)

Synonyms
- Agrista angasii Angas, 1847; Apina angasii Walker, 1855

Genus of moths

Cremnophora is a monotypic moth genus of the family Noctuidae erected by George Hampson in 1901. Its only species, Cremnophora angasii, was first described by George French Angas in 1847. It is found in South Australia.
