= Crinala =

Scientific classification
- Domain: Eukaryota
- Kingdom: Animalia
- Phylum: Arthropoda
- Class: Insecta
- Order: Lepidoptera
- Superfamily: Noctuoidea
- Family: Noctuidae
- Subfamily: Agaristinae
- Genus: Crinala; Jordan in Rothschild & Jordan, 1896
- Species: C. mimetica

Binomial name
- Crinala mimetica Rothschild, 1896

Genus of moths

Crinala is a monotypic moth genus of the family Noctuidae erected by Karl Jordan in 1896. Its only species, Crinala mimetica, was first described by Walter Rothschild in 1896. It is found in the Philippines.
