= Pseudospiris =

Scientific classification
- Domain: Eukaryota
- Kingdom: Animalia
- Phylum: Arthropoda
- Class: Insecta
- Order: Lepidoptera
- Superfamily: Noctuoidea
- Family: Noctuidae
- Subfamily: Agaristinae
- Genus: Pseudospiris; Butler, 1895
- Species: P. paidiformis

Binomial name
- Pseudospiris paidiformis Butler, 1895

Genus of moths

Pseudospiris is a monotypic moth genus of the family Noctuidae. Its only species, Pseudospiris paidiformis, is found in the Democratic Republic of the Congo, Tanzania, Malawi, Zambia, Zimbabwe and Zaire. Both the genus and species were first described by Arthur Gardiner Butler in 1895.
