= Neotuerta =

Scientific classification
- Domain: Eukaryota
- Kingdom: Animalia
- Phylum: Arthropoda
- Class: Insecta
- Order: Lepidoptera
- Superfamily: Noctuoidea
- Family: Noctuidae
- Subfamily: Agaristinae
- Genus: Neotuerta; Kiriakoff, 1977

Genus of moths

Neotuerta is a genus of moths of the family Noctuidae. The genus was erected by Sergius G. Kiriakoff in 1977.

== Species ==
- Neotuerta platensis (Berg, 1882) Argentina, Uruguay, Venezuela
- Neotuerta sabulosa (Felder, 1874) California, Mexico, Guatemala, Puerto Rico, Cuba
- Neotuerta hemicycla (Hampson, 1904)
- Neotuerta collectiora (Todd, 1966) Cuba, Puerto Rico, Florida
- Neotuerta lycaon (H. Druce, 1897) Ecuador
