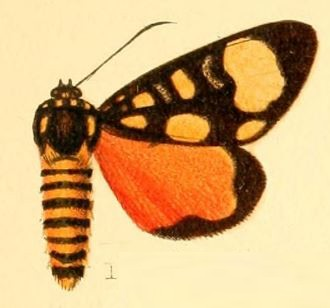
- Sergiusia pentelia

Scientific classification
- Domain: Eukaryota
- Kingdom: Animalia
- Phylum: Arthropoda
- Class: Insecta
- Order: Lepidoptera
- Superfamily: Noctuoidea
- Family: Noctuidae
- Subfamily: Agaristinae
- Genus: Sergiusia; Nye, 1980
- Species: S. pentelia

Binomial name
- Sergiusia pentelia (H. Druce, 1887)

= Sergiusia =

Genus of moths

Sergiusia is a monotypic moth genus of the family Noctuidae described by Nye in 1980. Its only species, Sergiusia pentelia, was described by Herbert Druce in 1887. It is known from Mozambique.
