= Alloasteropetes =

Scientific classification
- Kingdom: Animalia
- Phylum: Arthropoda
- Clade: Pancrustacea
- Class: Insecta
- Order: Lepidoptera
- Superfamily: Noctuoidea
- Family: Noctuidae
- Subfamily: Agaristinae
- Genus: Alloasteropetes; Kishida & Machijima, 1994

Synonyms
- Spectronissa (Agaristinae) Sugi, 1996

Genus of moths

Alloasteropetes is a genus of moths of the family Noctuidae. The genus was identified by Yasunori Kishida and Yoshiyuki Machijima in 1994.

== Species ==
- Alloasteropetes olivacea Kishida & Machijima, 1994
- Alloasteropetes guangdongensis Owada, Kishida & Wang, 2006 Guangdong
- Alloasteropetes olivacea Kishida & Machijima, 1994 Taiwan
- Alloasteropetes paradisea Kishida & Owada, 2003 Taiwan, China (Guangdong)
- Alloasteropetes parallela (Sugi, 1996) India (Uttar Pradesh), Thailand, Vietnam
