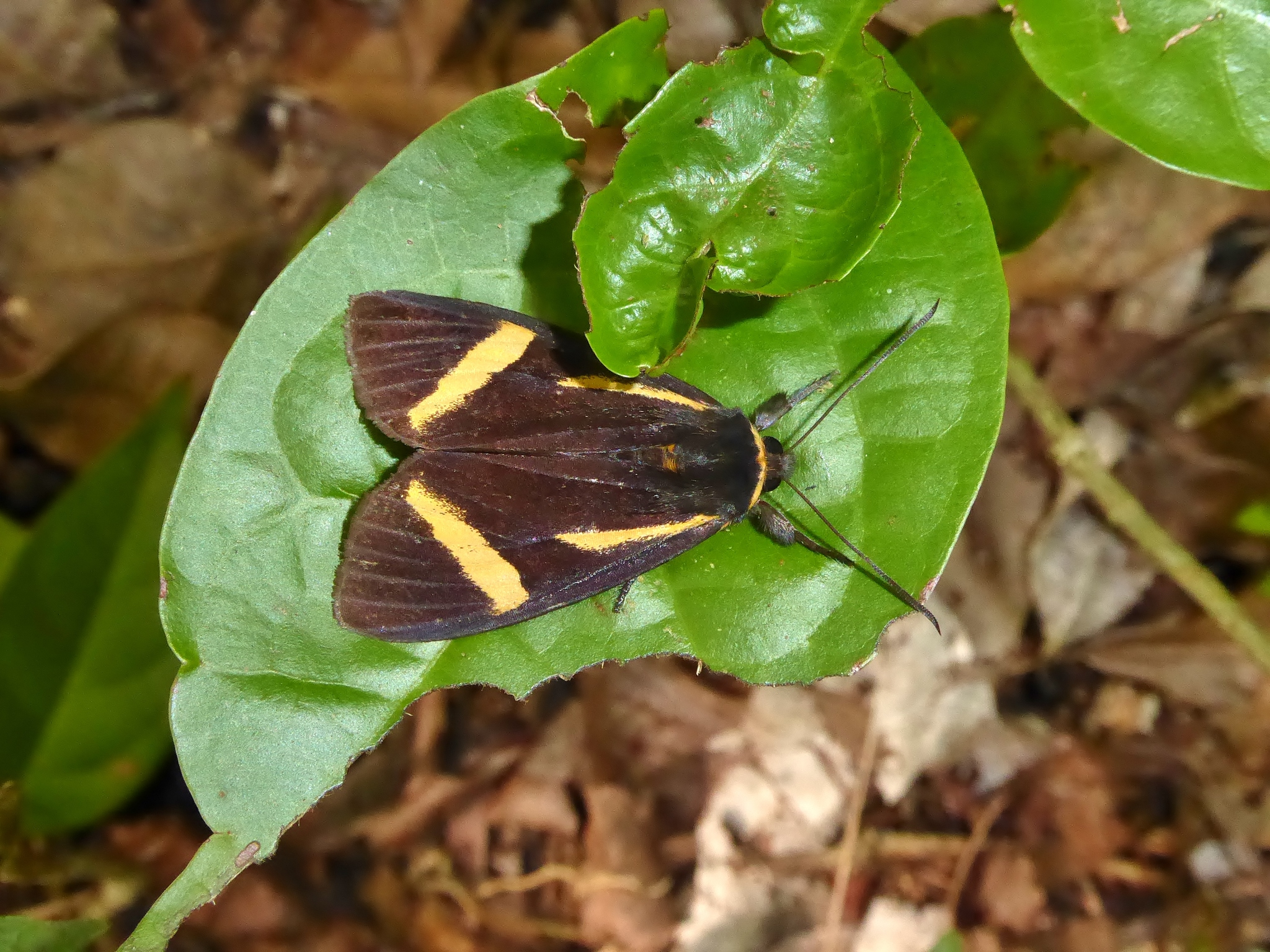
- Seirocastnia tribuna

Scientific classification
- Domain: Eukaryota
- Kingdom: Animalia
- Phylum: Arthropoda
- Class: Insecta
- Order: Lepidoptera
- Superfamily: Noctuoidea
- Family: Noctuidae
- Subfamily: Agaristinae
- Genus: Seirocastnia; Grote, 1866

= Seirocastnia =

Genus of moths

Seirocastnia is a genus of moths of the family Noctuidae. The genus was erected by Augustus Radcliffe Grote in 1866.

== Species ==
- Seirocastnia albifascia Joicey & Talbot, 1922
- Seirocastnia amalthea Dalman, 1823
- Seirocastnia columbina Westwood, 1877
- Seirocastnia extensa Jordan, 1908
- Seirocastnia inca Hering, 1925
- Seirocastnia latimargo Hering, 1925
- Seirocastnia magnifica Hering, 1925
- Seirocastnia meridiana Schaus, 1896
- Seirocastnia nocturna Burmeister, 1879
- Seirocastnia panamensis Hampson, 1901
- Seirocastnia tribuna Hübner, [1831]
- Seirocastnia volupia Druce, 1897
