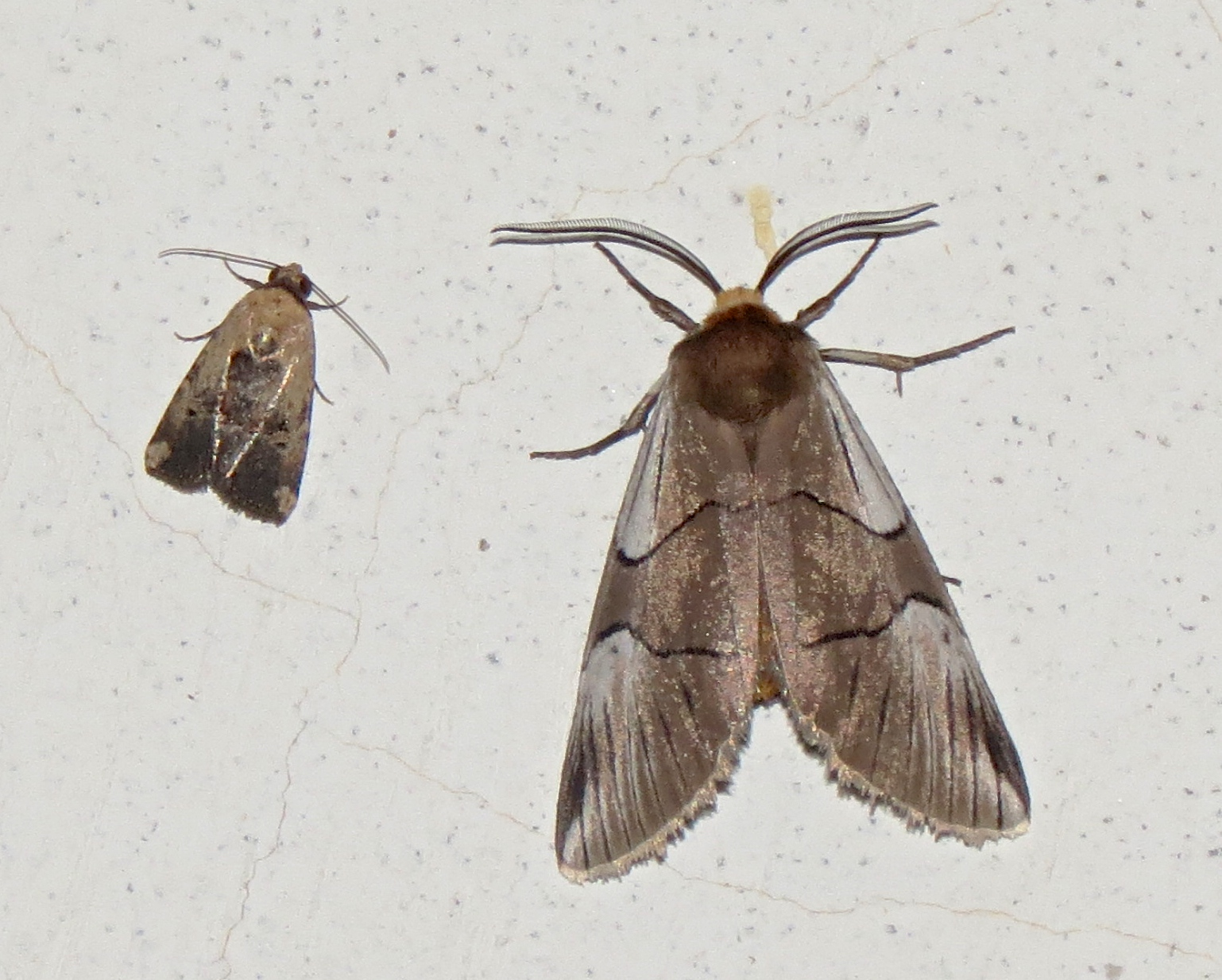
- Oxythaphora delta (on right)

Scientific classification
- Kingdom: Animalia
- Phylum: Arthropoda
- Class: Insecta
- Order: Lepidoptera
- Superfamily: Noctuoidea
- Family: Noctuidae
- Subfamily: Agaristinae
- Genus: Oxythaphora; Dyar, 1917
- Species: O. delta

Binomial name
- Oxythaphora delta Dyar, 1917

= Oxythaphora =

Genus of moths

Oxythaphora is a genus of moths of the family Noctuidae, containing only a single species, Oxythaphora delta; it was historically misclassified on multiple occasions, but in 2010 was determined to belong to the subfamily Agaristinae. Both the genus and species were first described by Harrison Gray Dyar Jr. in 1917.
