= Schalifrontia =

Scientific classification
- Domain: Eukaryota
- Kingdom: Animalia
- Phylum: Arthropoda
- Class: Insecta
- Order: Lepidoptera
- Superfamily: Noctuoidea
- Family: Noctuidae
- Subfamily: Agaristinae
- Genus: Schalifrontia; Hampson, 1901
- Species: S. furcifer

Binomial name
- Schalifrontia furcifer Hampson, 1901

Genus of moths

Schalifrontia is a monotypic moth genus of the family Noctuidae. Its only species, Schalifrontia furcifer, is found in the Brazilian state of Santa Catarina. Both the genus and species were first described by George Hampson in 1901.
