= Cruria =

Scientific classification
- Domain: Eukaryota
- Kingdom: Animalia
- Phylum: Arthropoda
- Class: Insecta
- Order: Lepidoptera
- Superfamily: Noctuoidea
- Family: Noctuidae
- Subfamily: Agaristinae
- Genus: Cruria; Jordan in Rothschild & Jordan, 1896

Genus of moths

Cruria is a genus of moths of the family Noctuidae.

== Species ==
- Cruria donowani Boisduval, 1832
- Cruria epicharita Turner, 1911
- Cruria kochii Macleay, 1866
- Cruria latifascia Jordan, 1912
- Cruria synopla Turner, 1903
- Cruria tropica Lucas, 1891
