= Weymeria =

Scientific classification
- Domain: Eukaryota
- Kingdom: Animalia
- Phylum: Arthropoda
- Class: Insecta
- Order: Lepidoptera
- Superfamily: Noctuoidea
- Family: Noctuidae
- Subfamily: Agaristinae
- Genus: Weymeria; Karsch, 1895
- Species: W. athene

Binomial name
- Weymeria athene (Weymer, 1892)

Synonyms
- Generic: Veymeria Hampson, 1901; Specific: Xanthospilopteryx athene Weymer, 1892

Genus of moths

Weymeria is a monotypic moth genus of the family Noctuidae erected by Ferdinand Karsch in 1895. Its only species, Weymeria athene, was first described by Weymer in 1892. It is found in Tanzania.
