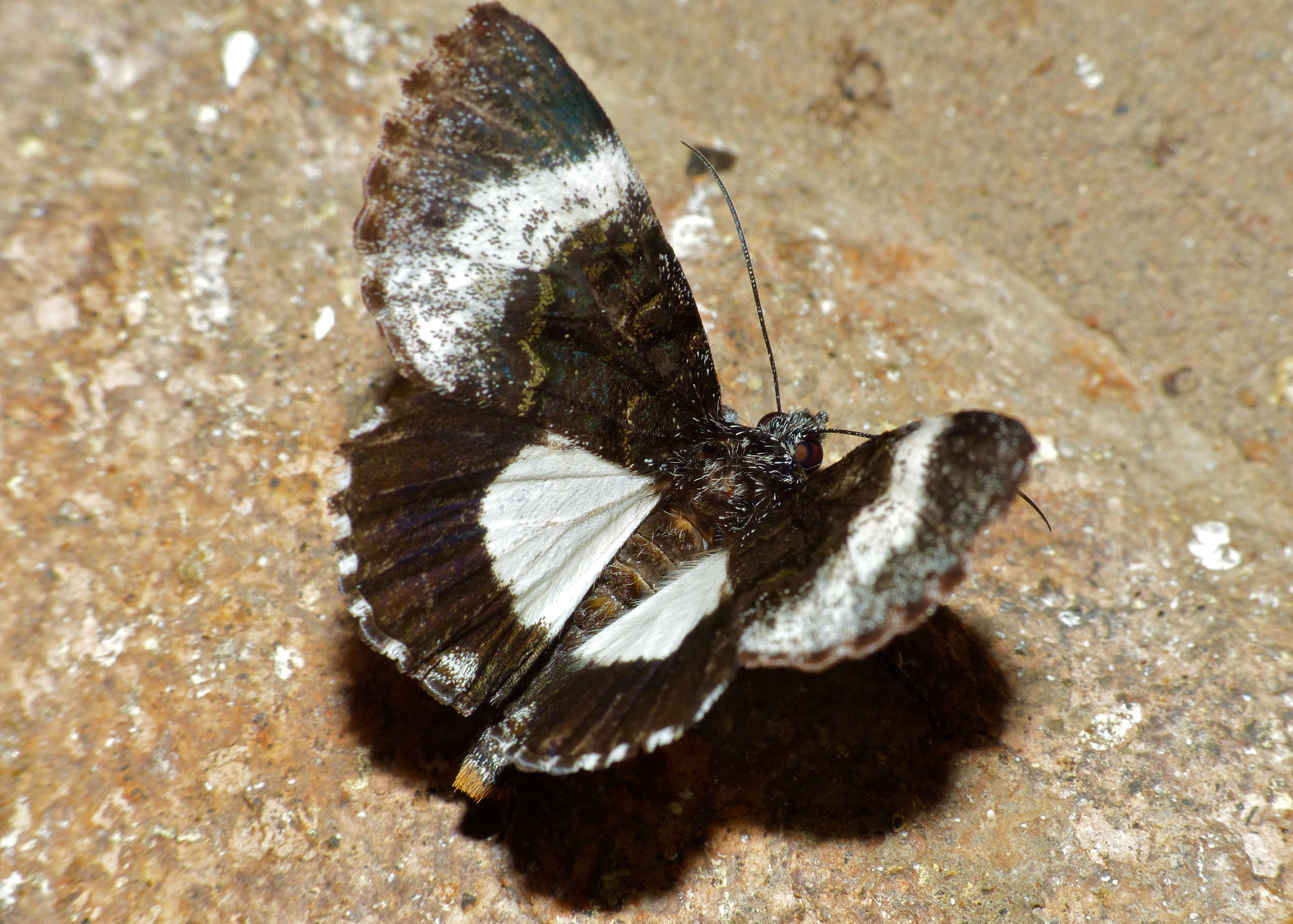
- Lophonotidia nocturna

Scientific classification
- Kingdom: Animalia
- Phylum: Arthropoda
- Class: Insecta
- Order: Lepidoptera
- Superfamily: Noctuoidea
- Family: Noctuidae
- Subfamily: Agaristinae
- Genus: Lophonotidia; Hampson, 1901

= Lophonotidia =

Genus of moths

Lophonotidia is a genus of moths of the family Noctuidae. The genus was erected by George Hampson in 1901.

== Species ==
- Lophonotidia melanoleuca Janse, 1937
- Lophonotidia nocturna Hampson, 1901
