= Idalima =

Scientific classification
- Domain: Eukaryota
- Kingdom: Animalia
- Phylum: Arthropoda
- Class: Insecta
- Order: Lepidoptera
- Superfamily: Noctuoidea
- Family: Noctuidae
- Subfamily: Agaristinae
- Genus: Idalima; Turner, 1903

Genus of moths

Idalima is a genus of moths of the family Noctuidae. The genus was described by Turner in 1903.

== Species ==
- Idalima aethrias Turner, 1908
- Idalima affinis Boisduval, 1832
- Idalima leonora Doubleday, 1846
- Idalima metasticta Hampson, 1910
- Idalima tasso Jordan, 1912
