= Aucula =

Scientific classification
- Kingdom: Animalia
- Phylum: Arthropoda
- Class: Insecta
- Order: Lepidoptera
- Superfamily: Noctuoidea
- Family: Noctuidae
- Subfamily: Agaristinae
- Genus: Aucula; Walker, 1862

Genus of moths

Aucula is a genus of moths of the family Noctuidae.

== Species ==
- Aucula azecsa Todd & Poole, 1981
- Aucula buprasium (Druce, 1897)
- Aucula byla Todd & Poole, 1981
- Aucula cerva Todd & Poole, 1981
- Aucula dita Todd & Poole, 1981
- Aucula exiva Todd & Poole, 1981
- Aucula fernandezi Todd & Poole, 1981
- Aucula fona Todd & Poole, 1981
- Aucula franclemonti Todd & Poole, 1981
- Aucula gura Todd & Poole, 1981
- Aucula hipia Todd & Poole, 1981
- Aucula ivia Todd & Poole, 1981
- Aucula jenia Todd & Poole, 1981
- Aucula josioides Walker, 1862
- Aucula kimsa Todd & Poole, 1981
- Aucula lolua Todd & Poole, 1981
- Aucula munroei Todd & Poole, 1981
- Aucula nakia Todd & Poole, 1981
- Aucula otasa Todd & Poole, 1981
- Aucula psejoa Todd & Poole, 1981
- Aucula sonura Todd & Poole, 1981
- Aucula tricuspia Zerny, 1916
- Aucula tusora Todd & Poole, 1981
- Aucula usara Todd & Poole, 1981
