= Phasidia =

Scientific classification
- Kingdom: Animalia
- Phylum: Arthropoda
- Class: Insecta
- Order: Lepidoptera
- Superfamily: Noctuoidea
- Family: Noctuidae
- Subfamily: Agaristinae
- Genus: Phasidia; Hampson, 1901
- Species: P. contraria

Binomial name
- Phasidia contraria (Walker, [1865])

Synonyms
- Phasis contraria Walker, [1865]; Othria meridionalis Schaus, 1892

Genus of moths

Phasidia is a monotypic moth genus of the family Noctuidae erected by George Hampson in 1901. Its only species, Phasidia contraria, was first described by Francis Walker in 1865. It is found in Peru and the Brazilian state of Rio de Janeiro.
