= Epischausia =

Scientific classification
- Domain: Eukaryota
- Kingdom: Animalia
- Phylum: Arthropoda
- Class: Insecta
- Order: Lepidoptera
- Superfamily: Noctuoidea
- Family: Noctuidae
- Subfamily: Agaristinae
- Genus: Epischausia; Kiriakoff, 1977
- Species: E. dispar

Binomial name
- Epischausia dispar (Rothschild, 1896)

Synonyms
- Aegocera dispar Rothschild, 1896; Schausia flavifrons Bethune-Baker, 1913

Genus of moths

Epischausia is a monotypic moth genus of the family Noctuidae erected by Sergius G. Kiriakoff in 1977. Its only species, Epischausia dispar, was first described by Walter Rothschild in 1977. It is found in Kenya, Zaire and the Democratic Republic of the Congo.
