= Saigonita =

Scientific classification
- Domain: Eukaryota
- Kingdom: Animalia
- Phylum: Arthropoda
- Class: Insecta
- Order: Lepidoptera
- Superfamily: Noctuoidea
- Family: Noctuidae
- Subfamily: Agaristinae
- Genus: Saigonita; Kiriakoff, 1971
- Species: S. paradoxa

Binomial name
- Saigonita paradoxa Kiriakoff, 1971

Genus of moths

Saigonita is a monotypic moth genus of the family Noctuidae. Its only species, Saigonita paradoxa, is found in Vietnam. Both the genus and species were first described by Sergius G. Kiriakoff in 1971.
