= Cisaucula =

Scientific classification
- Domain: Eukaryota
- Kingdom: Animalia
- Phylum: Arthropoda
- Class: Insecta
- Order: Lepidoptera
- Superfamily: Noctuoidea
- Family: Noctuidae
- Subfamily: Agaristinae
- Genus: Cisaucula; Todd, 1966
- Species: C. peruviana

Binomial name
- Cisaucula peruviana (H. Druce, 1910)

Synonyms
- Copidryas peruviana H. Druce, 1910

Genus of moths

Cisaucula is a monotypic moth genus of the family Noctuidae. Identified by Todd in 1910, its only species, Cisaucula peruviana, was first described by Herbert Druce in 1910. It is found in Peru.
