= Antigodasa =

Scientific classification
- Kingdom: Animalia
- Phylum: Arthropoda
- Class: Insecta
- Order: Lepidoptera
- Superfamily: Noctuoidea
- Family: Noctuidae
- Subfamily: Agaristinae
- Genus: Antigodasa; Kiriakoff & Viette, 1974
- Species: A. rufodiscalis

Binomial name
- Antigodasa rufodiscalis (Rothschild, 1896)

Synonyms
- Godasa rufodiscalis Rothschild, 1896

Genus of moths

Antigodasa is a monotypic moth genus of the family Noctuidae erected by Sergius G. Kiriakoff and Pierre Viette in 1974. Its only species, Antigodasa rufodiscalis, was first described by Walter Rothschild in 1896. This moth occurs in Madagascar.

This species has a wingspan of 20 mm (0.79 in). The forewings are chocolate brown passing towards the margin to reddish chocolate, covered with small blue patches. Hindwings are black with a large discal patch.
