= Hypotuerta =

Scientific classification
- Kingdom: Animalia
- Phylum: Arthropoda
- Class: Insecta
- Order: Lepidoptera
- Superfamily: Noctuoidea
- Family: Noctuidae
- Subfamily: Agaristinae
- Genus: Hypotuerta; Kiriakoff, 1977
- Species: H. transiens

Binomial name
- Hypotuerta transiens (Hampson, 1901)

Genus of moths

Hypotuerta is a monotypic moth genus of the family Noctuidae erected by Sergius G. Kiriakoff in 1977. Its only species, Hypotuerta transiens, was first described by George Hampson in 1901. It is found in Cameroon, the Democratic Republic of the Congo, Gabon and Nigeria.
