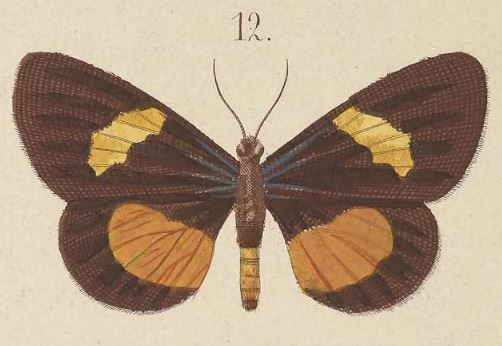
- Immetalia saturata

Scientific classification
- Domain: Eukaryota
- Kingdom: Animalia
- Phylum: Arthropoda
- Class: Insecta
- Order: Lepidoptera
- Superfamily: Noctuoidea
- Family: Noctuidae
- Subfamily: Agaristinae
- Genus: Immetalia; Jordan in Rothschild & Jordan, 1896

= Immetalia =

Genus of moths

Immetalia is a genus of moths of the family Noctuidae. The genus was erected by Karl Jordan in 1896.

== Species ==
- Immetalia bernsteinii (Vollenhoven, 1863) Gilolo, Morotai, Batchian, Buru
- Immetalia celebensis Rothschild, 1896 southern Sulawesi
- Immetalia cyanea Rothschild, 1896 New Guinea
- Immetalia eichhorni Rothschild & Jordan, 1901 Solomon Islands
- Immetalia longipalpis (Kirsch, 1877) New Guinea, New Ireland
- Immetalia meeki Rothschild, 1896 Louisidade, Goodenough Island, D'Entrecasteaui Islands, Fergusson Island
- Immetalia mokndoma de Vos, 2013 New Guinea
- Immetalia saturata (Walker, [1865]) Buru, New Guinea
