= Periscepta =

Scientific classification
- Domain: Eukaryota
- Kingdom: Animalia
- Phylum: Arthropoda
- Class: Insecta
- Order: Lepidoptera
- Superfamily: Noctuoidea
- Family: Noctuidae
- Subfamily: Agaristinae
- Genus: Periscepta; Turner, 1920

Genus of moths

Periscepta is a genus of moths of the family Noctuidae. The genus was described by Alfred Jefferis Turner in 1920.

== Species ==
- Periscepta butleri Swinhoe, 1892
- Periscepta polysticta Butler, 1875
