= Choeropais =

Scientific classification
- Kingdom: Animalia
- Phylum: Arthropoda
- Clade: Pancrustacea
- Class: Insecta
- Order: Lepidoptera
- Superfamily: Noctuoidea
- Family: Noctuidae
- Subfamily: Agaristinae
- Genus: Choeropais; Jordan in Seitz, 1913
- Species: C. jucunda

Binomial name
- Choeropais jucunda (Jordan, 1904)

Synonyms
- Pseudospiris jucunda Jordan, 1904

Genus of moths

Choeropais is a monotypic moth genus in the family Noctuidae. Its only species, Choeropais jucunda, is found in Angola, the Democratic Republic of the Congo and Zaire. Both the genus and species were first described by Karl Jordan, the genus in 1913 and the species nine years earlier in 1904.
