= Arctiopais =

Scientific classification
- Domain: Eukaryota
- Kingdom: Animalia
- Phylum: Arthropoda
- Class: Insecta
- Order: Lepidoptera
- Superfamily: Noctuoidea
- Family: Noctuidae
- Subfamily: Agaristinae
- Genus: Arctiopais; Jordan in Rothschild & Jordan, 1896
- Species: A. ambusta

Binomial name
- Arctiopais ambusta (Mabille, 1881)

Synonyms
- Hypsa ambusta Mabille, 1881

Genus of moths

Arctiopais is a monotypic moth genus of the family Noctuidae erected by Karl Jordan in 1896. Its only species, Arctiopais ambusta, was first described by Paul Mabille in 1881. It is found on Madagascar.
