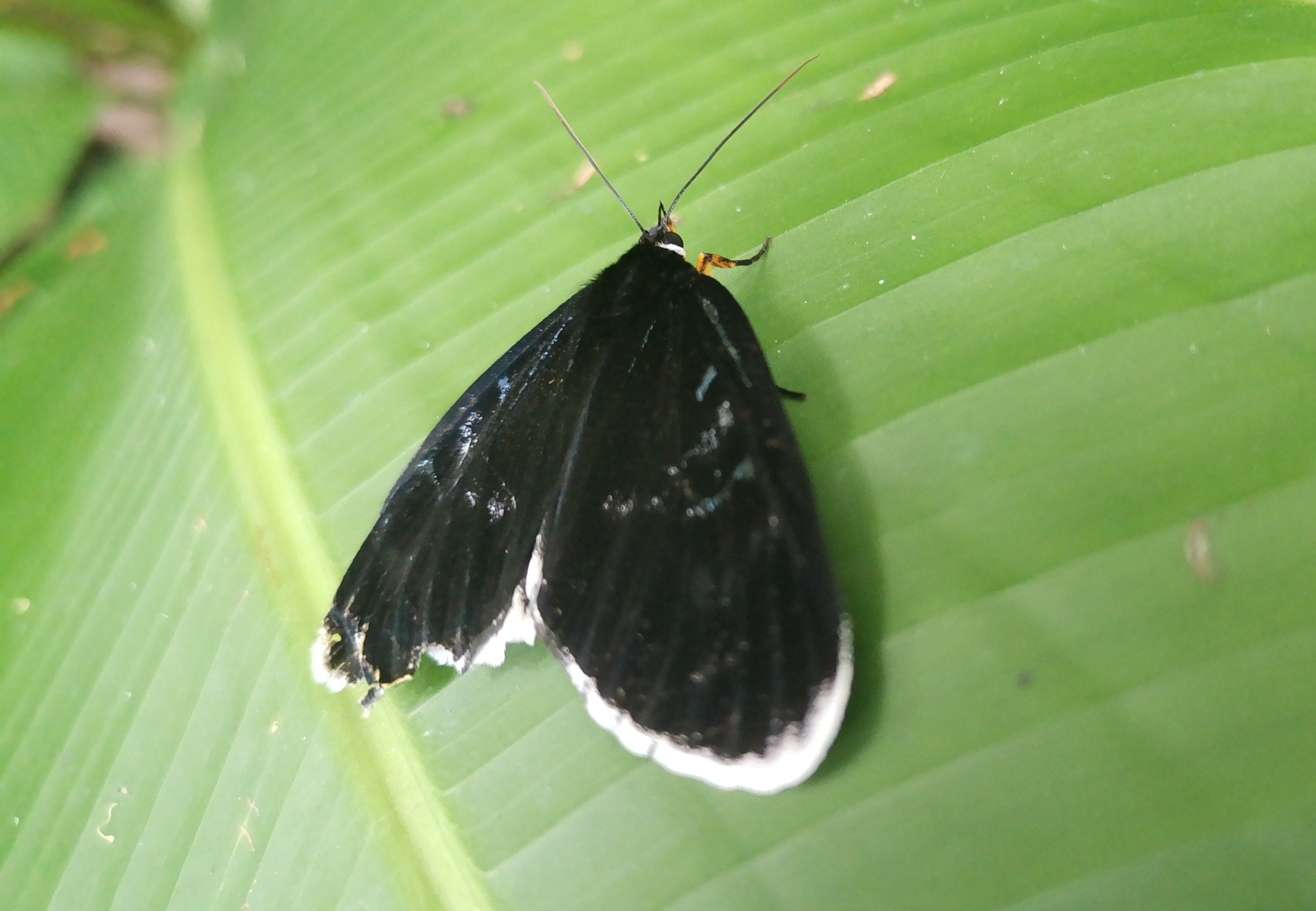
- Scrobigera albomarginata

Scientific classification
- Domain: Eukaryota
- Kingdom: Animalia
- Phylum: Arthropoda
- Class: Insecta
- Order: Lepidoptera
- Superfamily: Noctuoidea
- Family: Noctuidae
- Subfamily: Agaristinae
- Genus: Scrobigera; Jordan in Rothschild & Jordan, 1896

= Scrobigera =

Genus of moths

Scrobigera is a genus of moths of the family Noctuidae. The genus was erected by Karl Jordan in 1896.

== Species ==
- Scrobigera albomarginata Moore, 1872
- Scrobigera amatrix Westwood, 1848
- Scrobigera claggi Clench, 1953
- Scrobigera hesperioides Walker, 1862
- Scrobigera niveifasciata Rothschild, 1896
- Scrobigera proxima Walker, 1854
- Scrobigera semperi Felder, 1874
- Scrobigera taeniata Rothschild & Jordan, 1903
- Scrobigera umbrosa Clench, 1953
- Scrobigera vacillans Walker, [1865]
- Scrobigera vulcania Butler, 1875
