= Cruriopsis =

Scientific classification
- Domain: Eukaryota
- Kingdom: Animalia
- Phylum: Arthropoda
- Class: Insecta
- Order: Lepidoptera
- Superfamily: Noctuoidea
- Family: Noctuidae
- Subfamily: Agaristinae
- Genus: Cruriopsis

Genus of moths

Cruriopsis is a genus of moths of the family Noctuidae.

== Species ==
- Cruriopsis albomaculata Kishida, 1993
- Cruriopsis funebris Moore, 1872
  - Cruriopsis funebris cognata Jordan, 1912
  - Cruriopsis funebris funebris Moore, 1872
  - Cruriopsis funebris vithoroides Leech, 1890
