= Darcetina =

Scientific classification
- Kingdom: Animalia
- Phylum: Arthropoda
- Class: Insecta
- Order: Lepidoptera
- Superfamily: Noctuoidea
- Family: Noctuidae
- Subfamily: Agaristinae
- Genus: Darcetina; Felder, 1874
- Species: D. sublata

Binomial name
- Darcetina sublata (Walker, 1865)

Synonyms
- Bepara sublata Walker, 1865; Aucula sublata (Walker); Aucula particolor Dyar, 1914; Gerra pulchra Draudt, 1919

Genus of moths

Darcetina is a genus of moths of the family Noctuidae, containing only a single species, Darcetina sublata, found in Argentina and Brazil. The species was historically misclassified on multiple occasions, but in 2010 was determined to belong to the subfamily Agaristinae.
