= Vespola =

Scientific classification
- Kingdom: Animalia
- Phylum: Arthropoda
- Class: Insecta
- Order: Lepidoptera
- Superfamily: Noctuoidea
- Family: Noctuidae
- Subfamily: Agaristinae
- Genus: Vespola; Walker, 1867

Genus of moths

Vespola is a genus of moths of the family Noctuidae. The genus was erected by Francis Walker in 1867.

== Species ==
- Vespola caeruleifera Walker, 1867
- Vespola plumipes Schaus, 1912
- Vespola similissima Schaus, 1915
