= Tuertella =

Scientific classification
- Kingdom: Animalia
- Phylum: Arthropoda
- Clade: Pancrustacea
- Class: Insecta
- Order: Lepidoptera
- Superfamily: Noctuoidea
- Family: Noctuidae
- Subfamily: Agaristinae
- Genus: Tuertella; Kiriakoff, 1977
- Species: T. rema

Binomial name
- Tuertella rema (H. Druce, 1910)

Synonyms
- Tuerta rema H. Druce, 1910; Tuerta rema Hampson, 1920

Genus of moths

Tuertella is a monotypic moth genus of the family Noctuidae established by Sergius G. Kiriakoff in 1977. Its only species, Tuertella rema, was first described by Herbert Druce in 1910. It is found in Burundi, Tanzania and Zambia.
