= Syfanoidea =

Scientific classification
- Domain: Eukaryota
- Kingdom: Animalia
- Phylum: Arthropoda
- Class: Insecta
- Order: Lepidoptera
- Superfamily: Noctuoidea
- Family: Noctuidae
- Subfamily: Agaristinae
- Genus: Syfanoidea; Bartel, 1903
- Species: S. schencki

Binomial name
- Syfanoidea schencki Bartel, 1903

Synonyms
- Aegocera leighi Jordan, 1906; Aegocera schenci Hampson, 1920

Genus of moths

Syfanoidea is a monotypic moth genus of the family Noctuidae. Its only species, Syfanoidea schencki, is found in South Africa. Both the genus and species were first described by Max Bartel in 1903.
