= Syfania =

Scientific classification
- Domain: Eukaryota
- Kingdom: Animalia
- Phylum: Arthropoda
- Class: Insecta
- Order: Lepidoptera
- Superfamily: Noctuoidea
- Family: Noctuidae
- Subfamily: Agaristinae
- Genus: Syfania; Oberthür, 1893

Genus of moths

Syfania is a genus of moths of the family Noctuidae. The genus was described by Oberthür in 1893.

== Species ==
- Syfania bieti Oberthür, 1886
- Syfania dejeani Oberthür, 1893
- Syfania dubernardi Oberthür, 1894
- Syfania giraudeaui Oberthür, 1893
