= Nesaegocera =

Scientific classification
- Kingdom: Animalia
- Phylum: Arthropoda
- Class: Insecta
- Order: Lepidoptera
- Superfamily: Noctuoidea
- Family: Noctuidae
- Subfamily: Agaristinae
- Genus: Nesaegocera; Kiriakoff in Kiriakoff & Viette, 1974
- Species: N. comorana

Binomial name
- Nesaegocera comorana (Jordan, 1926)

Synonyms
- Aegocera comorana Jordan, 1926

Genus of moths

Nesaegocera is a monotypic moth genus of the family Noctuidae erected by Sergius G. Kiriakoff in 1974. Its only species, Nesaegocera comorana, was first described by Karl Jordan in 1926. It is found in the Comoro Islands in the Mozambique Channel east of Africa.
