= Pararothia =

Scientific classification
- Kingdom: Animalia
- Phylum: Arthropoda
- Class: Insecta
- Order: Lepidoptera
- Superfamily: Noctuoidea
- Family: Noctuidae
- Subfamily: Agaristinae
- Genus: Pararothia; Kiriakoff in Kiriakoff & Viette, 1974

Genus of moths

Pararothia is a genus of moths of the family Noctuidae. The genus was erected by Sergius G. Kiriakoff in 1974.

== Species ==
- Pararothia camilla Oberthür, 1923
- Pararothia gracilis Jordan, 1913
- Pararothia vieui Viette, 1966
