= Orthia =

Scientific classification
- Domain: Eukaryota
- Kingdom: Animalia
- Phylum: Arthropoda
- Class: Insecta
- Order: Lepidoptera
- Superfamily: Noctuoidea
- Family: Noctuidae
- Subfamily: Agaristinae
- Genus: Orthia; Herrich-Schäffer, [1853]
- Species: O. augias

Binomial name
- Orthia augias Herrich-Schäffer, [1853]

Synonyms
- Generic: Othria Westwood, 1877; Specific: Agarista lethe Felder, 1874; Orthia nexa Boisduval, 1874; Othria amazonica Westwood, 1877

Genus of moths

Orthia is a monotypic moth genus of the family Noctuidae. Its only species, Orthia augias, is found in the Brazilian state of Amazonas. Both the genus and species were first described by Gottlieb August Wilhelm Herrich-Schäffer in 1853.
