= Asteropetes =

Scientific classification
- Kingdom: Animalia
- Phylum: Arthropoda
- Class: Insecta
- Order: Lepidoptera
- Superfamily: Noctuoidea
- Family: Noctuidae
- Subfamily: Agaristinae
- Genus: Asteropetes; Hampson, 1901
- Species: A. noctuina

Binomial name
- Asteropetes noctuina (Butler, 1878)

Synonyms
- Seudyra noctuina Butler, 1878; Sendyra noctuina Butler, 1878

Genus of moths

Asteropetes is a monotypic moth genus of the family Noctuidae erected by George Hampson in 1901. Its only species, Asteropetes noctuina, was first described by Arthur Gardiner Butler in 1878. It is found on the Kuriles and in Japan.

The wingspan is 42–46 mm.

The larvae feed on the leaves of Vitis (grapevine) species.
