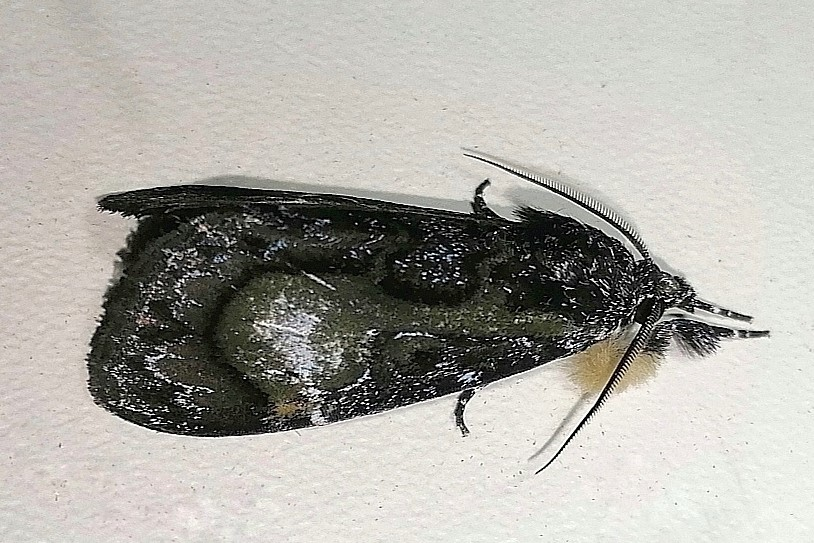
- Erocha mummia

Scientific classification
- Kingdom: Animalia
- Phylum: Arthropoda
- Clade: Pancrustacea
- Class: Insecta
- Order: Lepidoptera
- Superfamily: Noctuoidea
- Family: Noctuidae
- Subfamily: Agaristinae
- Genus: Erocha; Walker, 1854

Synonyms
- Leiosoma Felder & Rogenhofer, 1874; Leonides Druce, 1896

= Erocha =

Genus of moths

Erocha is a genus of moths in the family Noctuidae. The genus was erected by Francis Walker in 1854.

== Species ==
- Erocha affinis Draudt, 1919
- Erocha albifrea Schaus, 1914
- Erocha dipsas Schaus, 1914
- Erocha dolens Druce, 1904
- Erocha elaina Zerny, 1916
- Erocha irrorata E. D. Jones, 1915
- Erocha leucodisca Hampson, 1910
- Erocha leucotelus Walker, 1865
- Erocha mummia Cramer, [1779]
- Erocha picta Draudt, 1919
- Erocha semiviridis Druce, 1903
- Erocha trita Druce, 1910
