= Musurgina =

Scientific classification
- Domain: Eukaryota
- Kingdom: Animalia
- Phylum: Arthropoda
- Class: Insecta
- Order: Lepidoptera
- Superfamily: Noctuoidea
- Family: Noctuidae
- Subfamily: Agaristinae
- Genus: Musurgina; Jordan, 1921
- Species: M. laeta

Binomial name
- Musurgina laeta Jordan, 1921

Genus of moths

Musurgina is a monotypic moth genus of the family Noctuidae. Its only species, Musurgina laeta, is found on Madagascar. Both the genus and species were first described by Karl Jordan in 1921.
