= Coenotoca =

Scientific classification
- Domain: Eukaryota
- Kingdom: Animalia
- Phylum: Arthropoda
- Class: Insecta
- Order: Lepidoptera
- Superfamily: Noctuoidea
- Family: Noctuidae
- Subfamily: Agaristinae
- Genus: Coenotoca; Turner, 1903

Genus of moths

Coenotoca is a genus of moths of the family Noctuidae.

== Species ==
- Coenotoca subaspersa Walker, [1865]
- Coenotoca unimacula Lower, 1903
