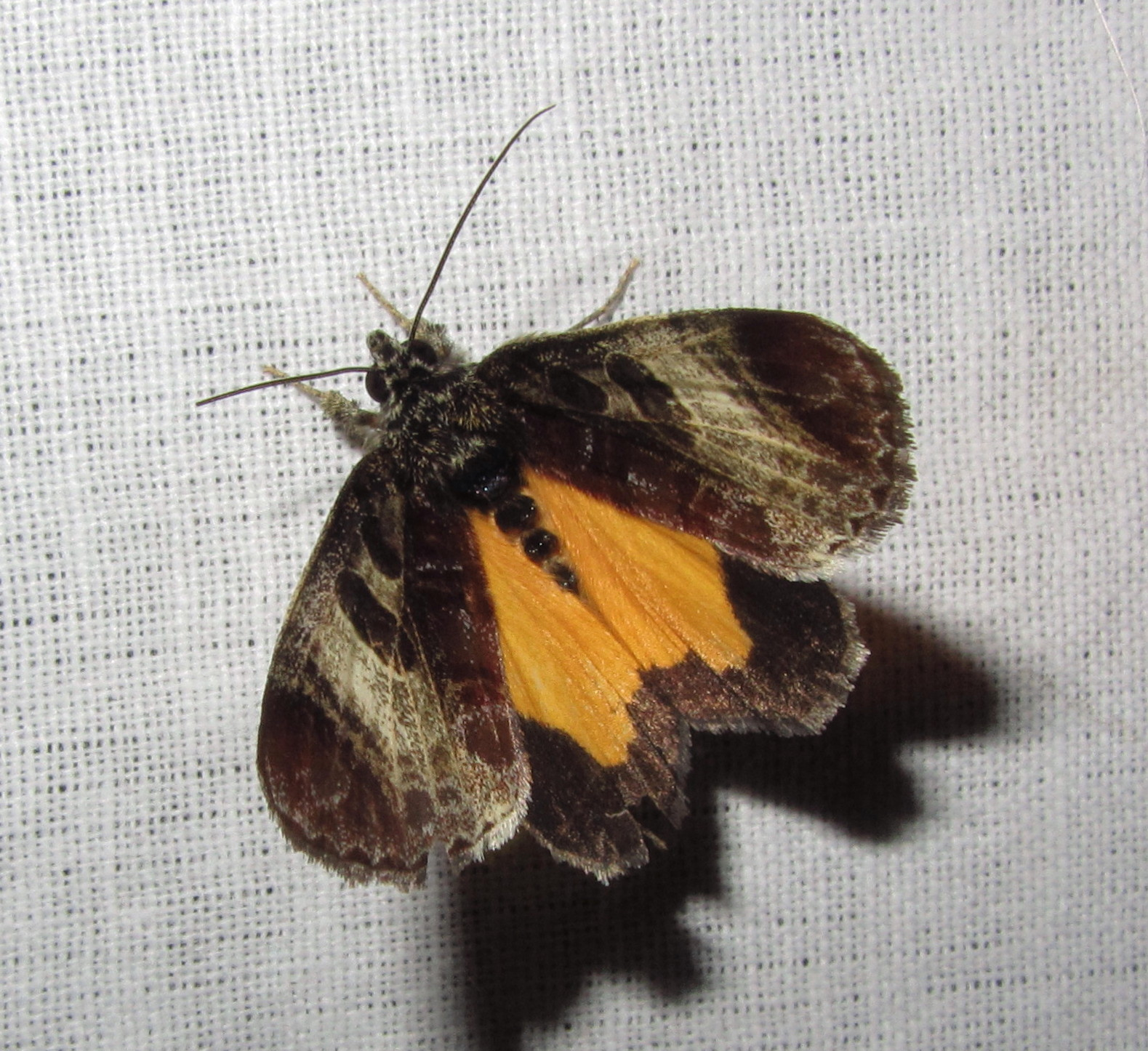
- Sarbanissa subalba

Scientific classification
- Kingdom: Animalia
- Phylum: Arthropoda
- Class: Insecta
- Order: Lepidoptera
- Superfamily: Noctuoidea
- Family: Noctuidae
- Subfamily: Agaristinae
- Genus: Sarbanissa; Walker, 1865

Synonyms
- Seudyra Stretch, 1875

= Sarbanissa =

Genus of moths

Sarbanissa is a genus of moths of the family Noctuidae. The genus was erected by Francis Walker in 1875.

== Species ==
- Sarbanissa albifascia Walker, 1865
- Sarbanissa bala Moore, 1865
- Sarbanissa catacoloides Walker, 1862
- Sarbanissa cirrha Jordan, 1912
- Sarbanissa flavida Leech, 1890
- Sarbanissa insocia Walker, 1865
- Sarbanissa interposita Hampson, 1910
- Sarbanissa jordani Clench, 1953
- Sarbanissa longipennis Walker, 1865
- Sarbanissa mandarina Leech, 1890
- Sarbanissa melanura Jordan, 1912
- Sarbanissa nepcha Moore, 1867
- Sarbanissa poecila Jordan, 1912
- Sarbanissa subflava Moore, 1877
- Sarbanissa sundana Holloway, 1982
- Sarbanissa transiens Walker, 1856
- Sarbanissa venosa Moore, 1879
- Sarbanissa venusta Leech, 1888
- Sarbanissa vitalis Jordan, 1926
