= Aethodes =

Scientific classification
- Kingdom: Animalia
- Phylum: Arthropoda
- Class: Insecta
- Order: Lepidoptera
- Superfamily: Noctuoidea
- Family: Noctuidae
- Subfamily: Agaristinae
- Genus: Aethodes; Hampson, 1918
- Species: A. angustipennis

Binomial name
- Aethodes angustipennis Hampson, 1918

Genus of moths

Aethodes is a monotypic moth genus of the family Noctuidae. Its only species, Aethodes angustipennis, is found in Nigeria and Ghana. Both the species and genus were first described by George Hampson in 1918.
