= Parothria =

Scientific classification
- Kingdom: Animalia
- Phylum: Arthropoda
- Class: Insecta
- Order: Lepidoptera
- Superfamily: Noctuoidea
- Family: Noctuidae
- Subfamily: Agaristinae
- Genus: Parothria; Hampson, 1901
- Species: P. ecuadorina

Binomial name
- Parothria ecuadorina (Westwood, 1877)

Synonyms
- Othria ecuadorina Westwood, 1877

Genus of moths

Parothria is a monotypic moth genus of the family Noctuidae erected by George Hampson in 1901. Its only species, Parothria ecuadorina, was first described by John O. Westwood in 1877. It is found in Ecuador.
