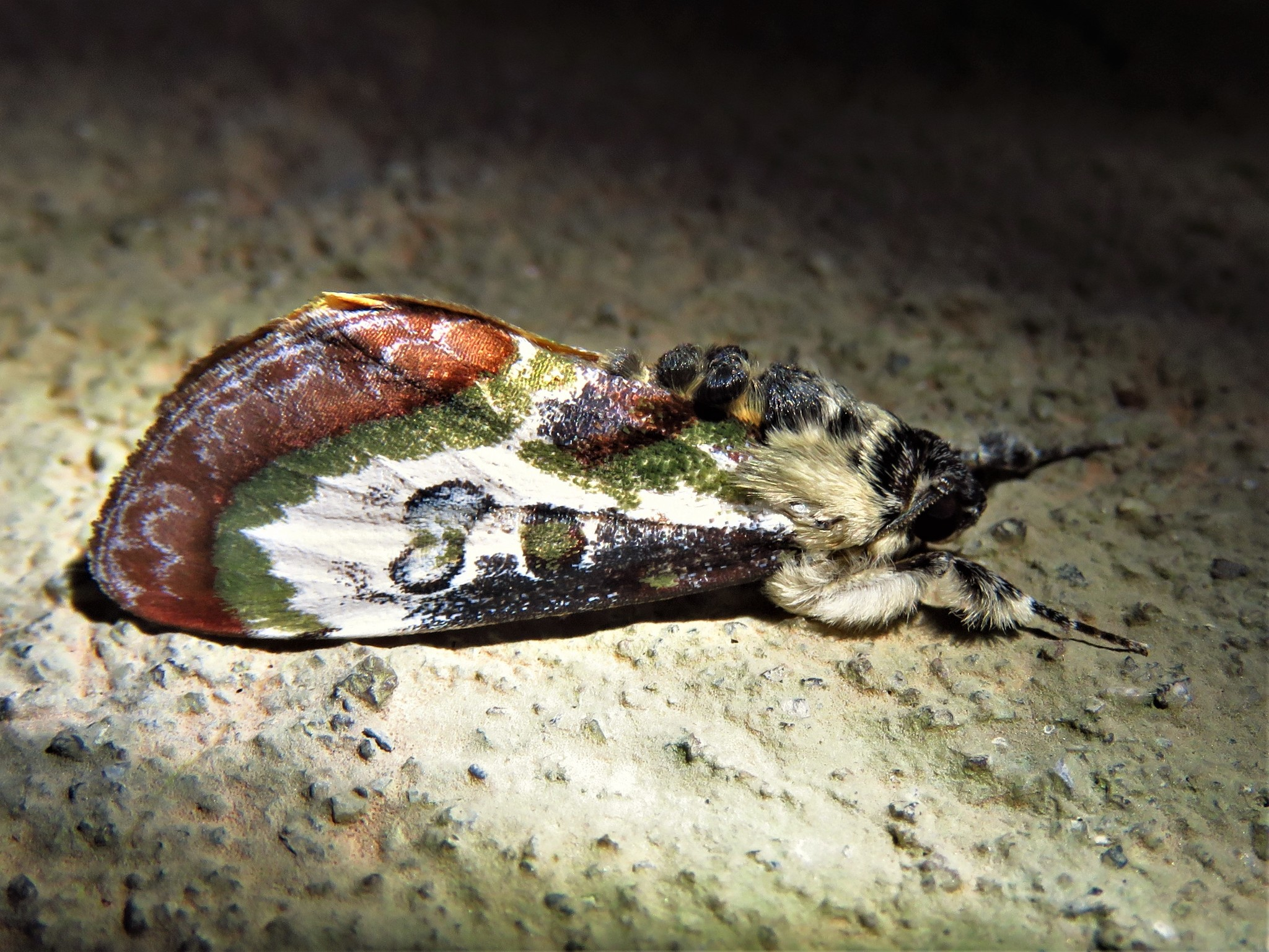

Scientific classification
- Domain: Eukaryota
- Kingdom: Animalia
- Phylum: Arthropoda
- Class: Insecta
- Order: Lepidoptera
- Superfamily: Noctuoidea
- Family: Noctuidae
- Genus: Epithisanotia; Kiriakoff, 1977
- Species: E. sanctaejohannis

Binomial name
- Epithisanotia sanctaejohannis (Walker, 1856)

= Epithisanotia =

Genus of moths

Epithisanotia is a monotypic genus of moths in the family Noctuidae that was erected by Sergius G. Kiriakoff in 1856. Its only species, Epithisanotia sanctaejohannis, was first described by Francis Walker in 1856. It is found in Mexico.
