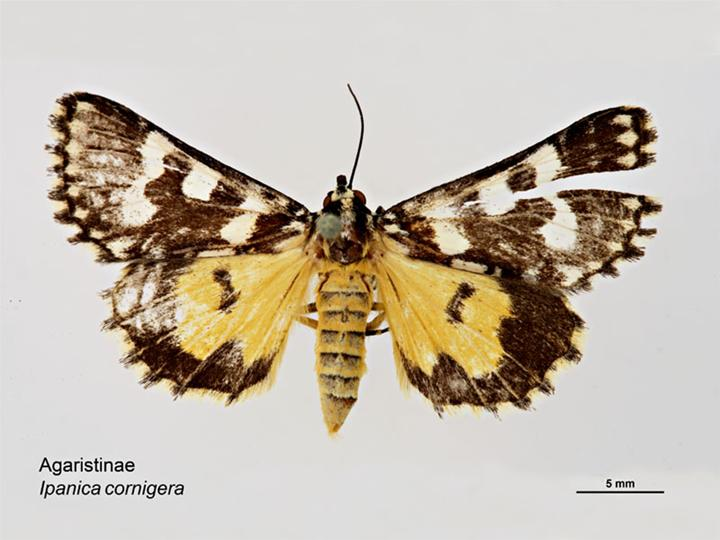
- Dorsal view
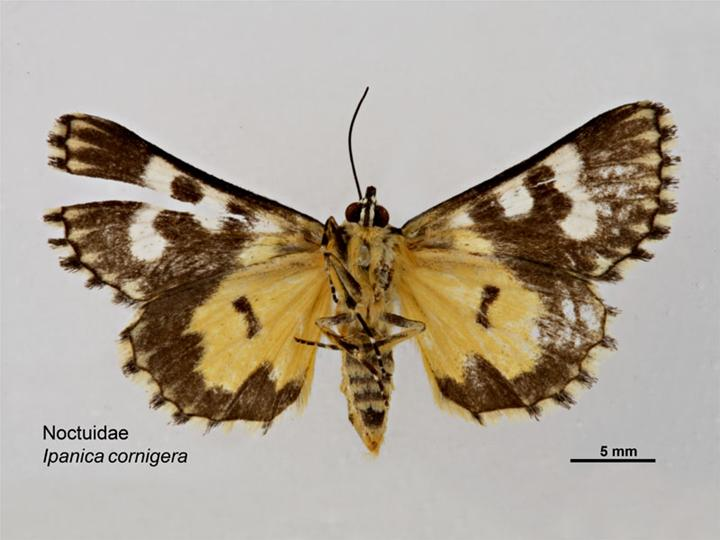
- Ventral view

Scientific classification
- Domain: Eukaryota
- Kingdom: Animalia
- Phylum: Arthropoda
- Class: Insecta
- Order: Lepidoptera
- Superfamily: Noctuoidea
- Family: Noctuidae
- Genus: Ipanica; Hampson, 1908
- Species: I. cornigera

Binomial name
- Ipanica cornigera (Butler, 1886)

Synonyms
- Generic: Ipana Jordan, 1896; Specific: Aegocera cornigera Butler, 1886

= Ipanica =

Monotypic genus of moths

Ipanica is a genus of moths of the family Noctuidae erected by George Hampson in 1908. Its only species, Ipanica cornigera, the laced day-moth, was first described by Arthur Gardiner Butler in 1886. It is found along the Australian east coast from Queensland to Tasmania.
