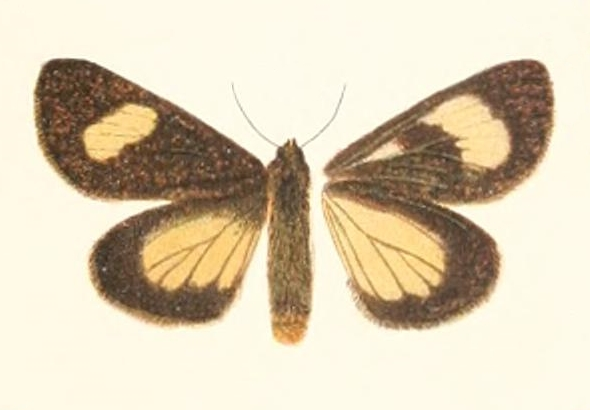
- Rhosus posticus

Scientific classification
- Domain: Eukaryota
- Kingdom: Animalia
- Phylum: Arthropoda
- Class: Insecta
- Order: Lepidoptera
- Superfamily: Noctuoidea
- Family: Noctuidae
- Subfamily: Agaristinae
- Genus: Rhosus; Walker, 1854

Synonyms
- Mystrocephala Herrich-Schäffer, 1855; Pycnodontis Felder, 1874

= Rhosus (moth) =

Genus of moths

Rhosus is a genus of moths of the family Noctuidae. The genus was erected by Francis Walker in 1854.

== Species ==
- Rhosus aguirreri Berg, 1882
- Rhosus albiceps Draudt, 1919
- Rhosus columbiana Hampson, 1910
- Rhosus denieri Köhler, 1936
- Rhosus isabella Dognin, 1898
- Rhosus judsoni (Schaus, 1933)
- Rhosus leuconoe Felder, 1874
- Rhosus ornata Jörgensen, 1935
- Rhosus ovata Rothschild, 1896
- Rhosus pampeana Jörgensen, 1935
- Rhosus posticus Walker, 1854
- Rhosus spadicea Felder, 1874
- Rhosus storniana Köhler, 1936
