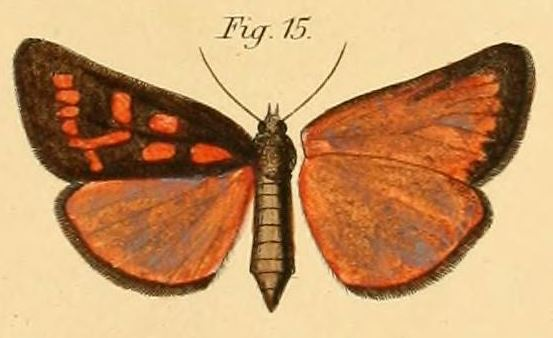
- Brephos moldaenkei

Scientific classification
- Kingdom: Animalia
- Phylum: Arthropoda
- Clade: Pancrustacea
- Class: Insecta
- Order: Lepidoptera
- Superfamily: Noctuoidea
- Family: Noctuidae
- Subfamily: Agaristinae
- Genus: Brephos; Hübner, [1813]

Synonyms
- Brepha Billberg, 1820 (missp.); Pais Hübner, 1821; Brephia Hübner, 1822 (missp.)

= Brephos =

Genus of moths

Brephos is a genus of moths of the family Noctuidae.

== Species ==
- Brephos ansorgei Jordan, 1904
- Brephos decora Linnaeus, 1764
- Brephos festiva Jordan, 1913
- Brephos moldaenkei (Dewitz, 1881)
- Brephos nyassana Bartel, 1903
- Brephos staeleniana Kiriakoff, 1954
- Brephos sublaeta Kiriakoff, 1975
