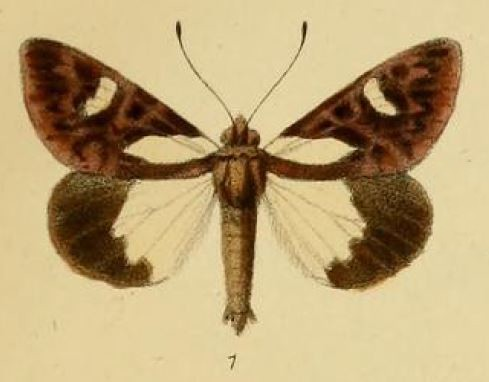
- Schausia leona

Scientific classification
- Domain: Eukaryota
- Kingdom: Animalia
- Phylum: Arthropoda
- Class: Insecta
- Order: Lepidoptera
- Superfamily: Noctuoidea
- Family: Noctuidae
- Subfamily: Agaristinae
- Genus: Schausia; Karsch, 1895

= Schausia =

Genus of moths

Schausia is a genus of moths of the family Noctuidae erected by Ferdinand Karsch in 1895. It is named in honor of William Schaus.

== Species ==
- Schausia coryndoni Rothschild, 1896
- Schausia dambuza Kiriakoff, 1975
- Schausia gladiatoria Holland, 1893
- Schausia greenwayiae Stoneham, 1963
- Schausia langazana Kiriakoff, 1974
- Schausia leona Schaus & Clemens, 1893
- Schausia mantatisi Kiriakoff, 1975
- Schausia mkabi Kiriakoff, 1974
