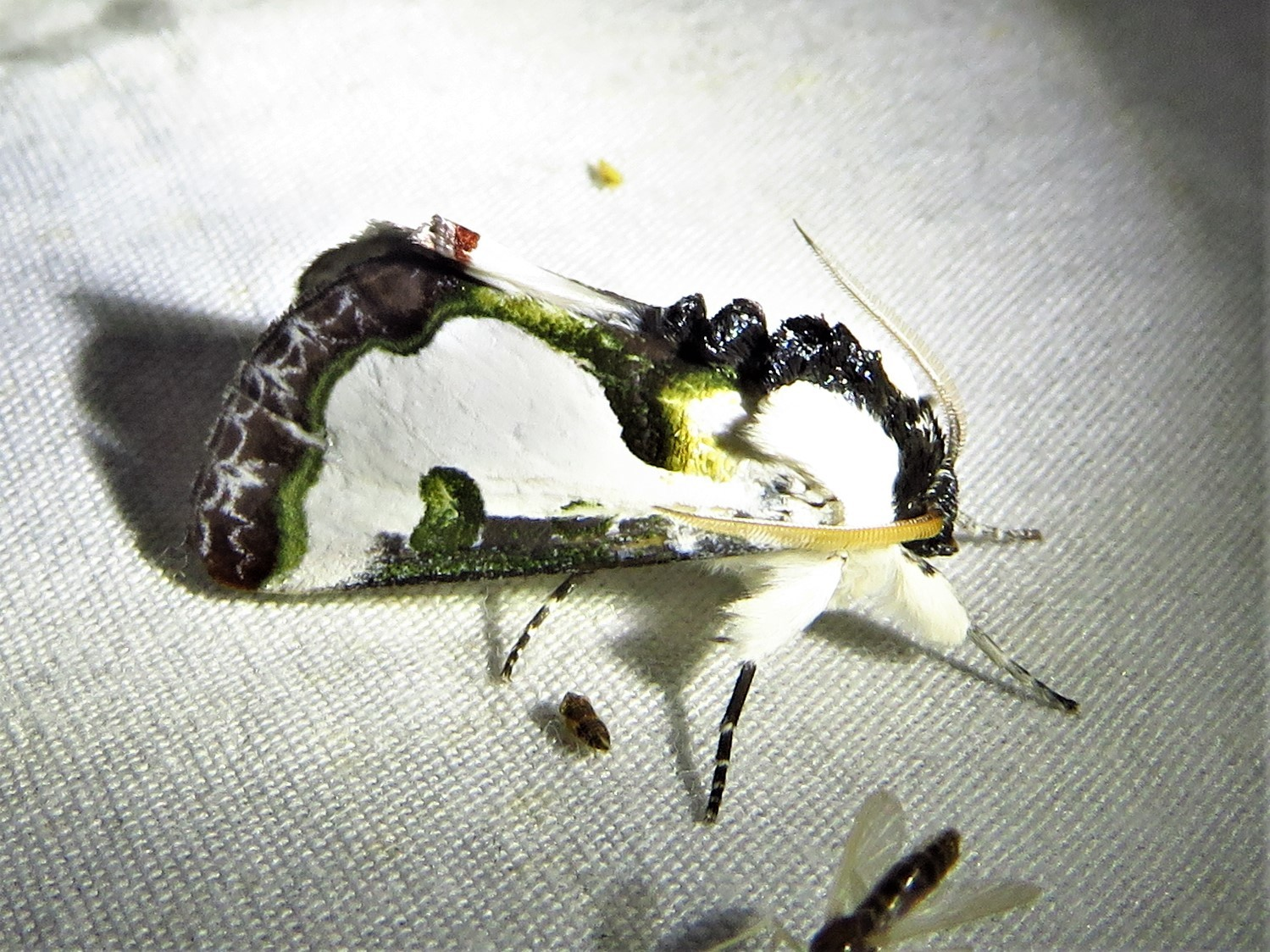

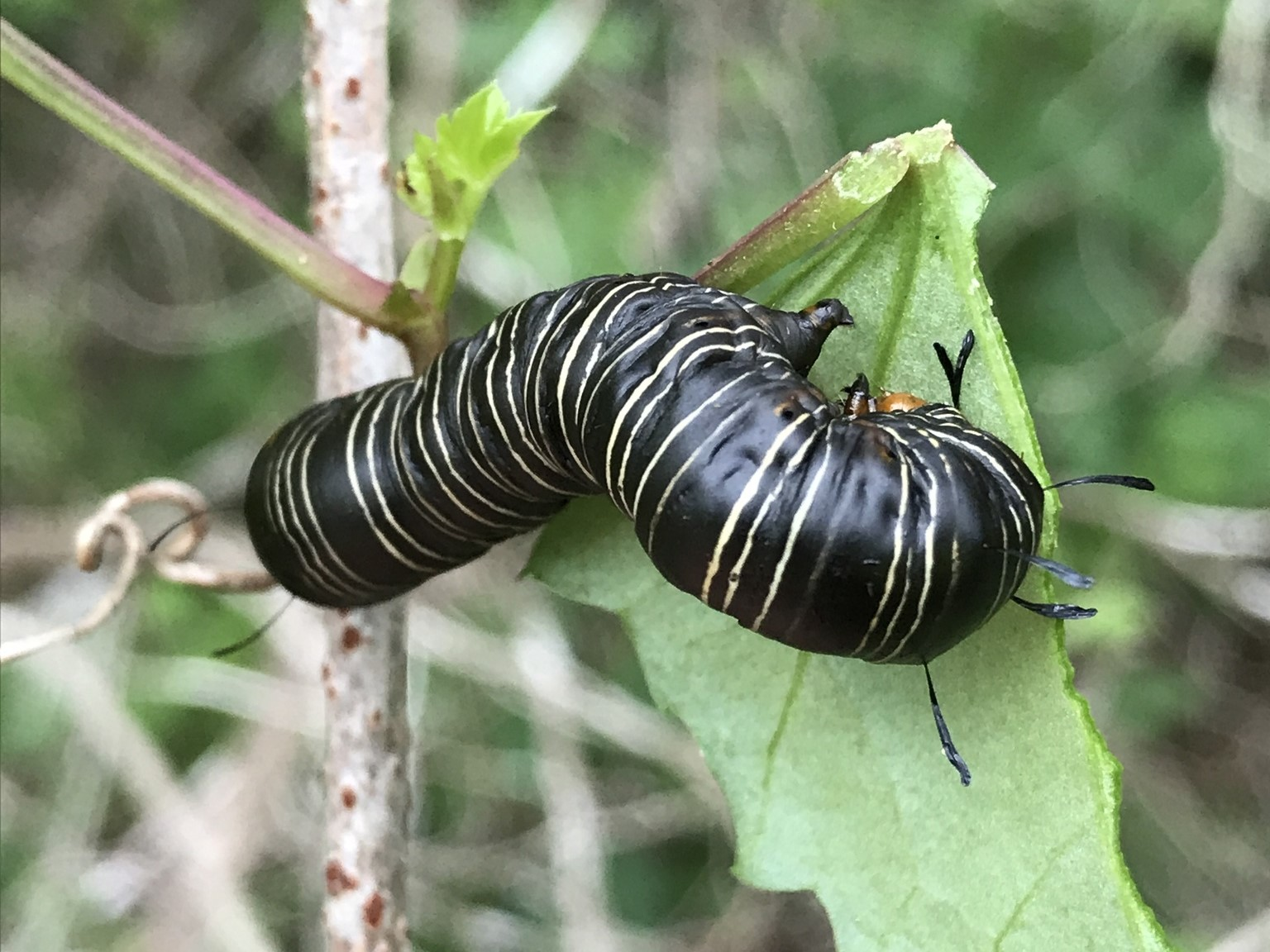
- Adult (top) and larva (bottom)

Scientific classification
- Kingdom: Animalia
- Phylum: Arthropoda
- Clade: Pancrustacea
- Class: Insecta
- Order: Lepidoptera
- Superfamily: Noctuoidea
- Family: Noctuidae
- Genus: Xerociris; Cockerell, 1904
- Species: X. wilsonii

Binomial name
- Xerociris wilsonii (Grote, 1863)

Synonyms
- (Genus): Ciris Grote, 1863; (Species): Ciris wilsonii Grote, 1863

= Xerociris =

Genus of moths

Xerociris is a genus of moths in the family Noctuidae. It was erected by Theodore Dru Alison Cockerell in 1904. It is monotypic, being represented by the single species, Xerociris wilsonii, that was first described by Augustus Radcliffe Grote in 1863. It is found in the US state of Texas.
