= Chelonomorpha =

Scientific classification
- Domain: Eukaryota
- Kingdom: Animalia
- Phylum: Arthropoda
- Class: Insecta
- Order: Lepidoptera
- Superfamily: Noctuoidea
- Family: Noctuidae
- Subfamily: Agaristinae
- Genus: Chelonomorpha; Motschulsky, 1860

Genus of moths

Chelonomorpha is a genus of moths of the family Noctuidae.

== Species ==
- Chelonomorpha austeni Moore, 1879
- Chelonomorpha burmana Strand, 1912
- Chelonomorpha formosana Miyake, 1907
- Chelonomorpha japana Motschulsky, 1860
