= Fleta (moth) =

Scientific classification
- Kingdom: Animalia
- Phylum: Arthropoda
- Clade: Pancrustacea
- Class: Insecta
- Order: Lepidoptera
- Superfamily: Noctuoidea
- Family: Noctuidae
- Subfamily: Agaristinae
- Genus: Fleta; Jordan, 1896

Type species
- Fleta belangeri Guérin-Méneville, 1834

species
- Fleta belangeri Guérin-Méneville, 1834; Fleta moorei Felder

Genus of moths

Fleta is a genus of moths of the family Noctuidae.

== Species ==
- Fleta belangeri Guérin-Méneville, 1834
- Fleta moorei Felder
