= Paida =

Scientific classification
- Domain: Eukaryota
- Kingdom: Animalia
- Phylum: Arthropoda
- Class: Insecta
- Order: Lepidoptera
- Superfamily: Noctuoidea
- Family: Noctuidae
- Genus: Paida; Jordan in Rothschild & Jordan, 1896
- Species: P. pulchra

Binomial name
- Paida pulchra (Trimen, 1863)

Synonyms
- Pais pulchra Trimen, 1863; Pais gordoni Butler, 1879

Genus of moths

Paida is a monotypic moth genus of the family Noctuidae erected by Karl Jordan in 1896. Its only species, Paida pulchra, was first described by Roland Trimen in 1863. It is found in South Africa, Namibia and Zimbabwe.
