= List of noctuid genera: L =

The huge moth family Noctuidae contains the following genera:

A B C D E F G H I J K L M N O P Q R S T U V W X Y Z

- Lacanobia
- Lacera
- Lacibisa
- Lacides
- Lacinipolia
- Lagoptera
- Lambana
- Lampadephora
- Lampra
- Lamprolopha
- Lamprosia
- Lamprosticta
- Lamprotes
- Lamura
- Lankialaia
- Laphygma
- Laquea
- Larassa
- Larixsotis
- Lascoria
- Lasianobia
- Lasiestra
- Lasionhada
- Lasionycta
- Lasiopoderes
- Lasiplexia
- Lasiridia
- Laspeyria
- Latanoctua
- Latebraria
- Lathosea
- Latiphaea
- Latirostrum
- Laugasa
- Lecasia
- Lecerfia
- Ledaea
- Ledereragrotis
- Leida
- Leiometopon
- Leiorhynx
- Leioselia
- Leiostola
- Leistera
- Lemmeria
- Leonides
- Leoniloma
- Lephana
- Lepidodelta
- Lepidodes
- Lepidopalpia
- Lepidopyrga
- Lepidotrama
- Lepipolys
- Lepitoreuma
- Leptamma
- Lepteria
- Leptoctenista
- Leptologia
- Leptotroga
- Lesmone
- Letaba
- Letis
- Leucagrotis
- Leucania
- Leucanimorpha
- Leucanitis
- Leucapamea
- Leucatomis
- Leucochlaena
- Leucocnemis
- Leucocosmia
- Leucogonia
- Leucogramma
- Leucomelas
- Leuconycta
- Leucosemia
- Leucosigma
- Leucotela
- Leucotelia
- Leucotrachea
- Leucovis
- Leumicamia
- Libisosa
- Libyana
- Libyphaenis
- Libystica
- Licha
- Ligidia
- Lignicida
- Lignispalta
- Lineopalpa
- Lineostriastiria
- Lipatephia
- Listonia
- Lithacodia
- Lithilaria
- Litholomia
- Lithomoia
- Lithophane
- Lithophasia
- Lithopolia
- Lithosiopsis
- Litocala
- Litognatha
- Litomitus
- Litoprosopus
- Litoscelis
- Litosea
- Liviana
- Lobophyllodes
- Loboplusia
- Lobotorna
- Lochia
- Lois
- Lomanaltes
- Lomilysis
- Longalatedes
- Longicella
- Longivesica
- Lopharthrum
- Lophiophora
- Lophocalama
- Lophoceramica
- Lophocerynea
- Lophocoleus
- Lophocraspedon
- Lophocryptis
- Lophocyttarra
- Lophodaxa
- Lophodelta
- Lophoditta
- Lophograpta
- Lophomilia
- Lophomyra
- Lophonotidia
- Lophonycta
- Lophopanilla
- Lophophora
- Lophoplusia
- Lophoptera
- Lophorache
- Lophoruza
- Lophotarsia
- Lophotavia
- Lophoterges
- Lophotidia
- Lophotoma
- Lophotyna
- Lophozancla
- Lophuda
- Lorezia
- Loscopia
- Loxagrotis
- Loxioda
- Loxopamea
- Luberta
- Lucasidia
- Luceria
- Luceriola
- Lugana
- Lukaschia
- Luperina
- Luteohadena
- Lutogonia
- Lycanades
- Lycaugesia
- Lycimna
- Lycophorus
- Lycophotia
- Lygephila
- Lygniodes
- Lygranthoecia
- Lyncestis
- Lysimelia
- Lyssia
- Lytaea
- Lythrodes
