= Phycidopsis albovittata =

Scientific classification
- Kingdom: Animalia
- Phylum: Arthropoda
- Clade: Pancrustacea
- Class: Insecta
- Order: Lepidoptera
- Superfamily: Noctuoidea
- Family: Scranciidae
- Genus: Phycidopsis
- Species: P. albovittata

Binomial name
- Phycidopsis albovittata (Hampson, 1893)

Synonyms
- Sentana violascens Gaede, 1930

Species of moth

Phycidopsis albovittata is a moth of the family Scranciidae first described by George Hampson in 1893. It is found in Sri Lanka, India, Sundaland, Luzon in the Philippines and Sulawesi.

Forewing costa edged narrowly with dark brown. A longitudinal pale silver-grey area that grades darker dorsad into a broad, dull purplish-grey area along the dorsum. When at rest, the adult holds its wings tightly scrolled round the body in cylindrical fashion. The caterpillar is slender. Head is round, slightly bilobed dorsally, smooth and white. A maroon band down each lobe, and with rather long, pointed black hairs. Body surface is glossy. Body colour dull green. Spiracles are small, black. Host plant is Antidesma species.
