= Ziza =

Ziza may refer to:

- Ziza (moth), a genus of moths in the family Erebidae
- Ziza (biblical figure), a minor biblical figure
- Al-Jizah, Jordan, historically known as Ziza.
