= Phoberia ingenua =

Scientific classification
- Kingdom: Animalia
- Phylum: Arthropoda
- Clade: Pancrustacea
- Class: Insecta
- Order: Lepidoptera
- Superfamily: Noctuoidea
- Family: Erebidae
- Genus: Phoberia
- Species: P. ingenua

Binomial name
- Phoberia ingenua (Walker, 1858)

Species of moth

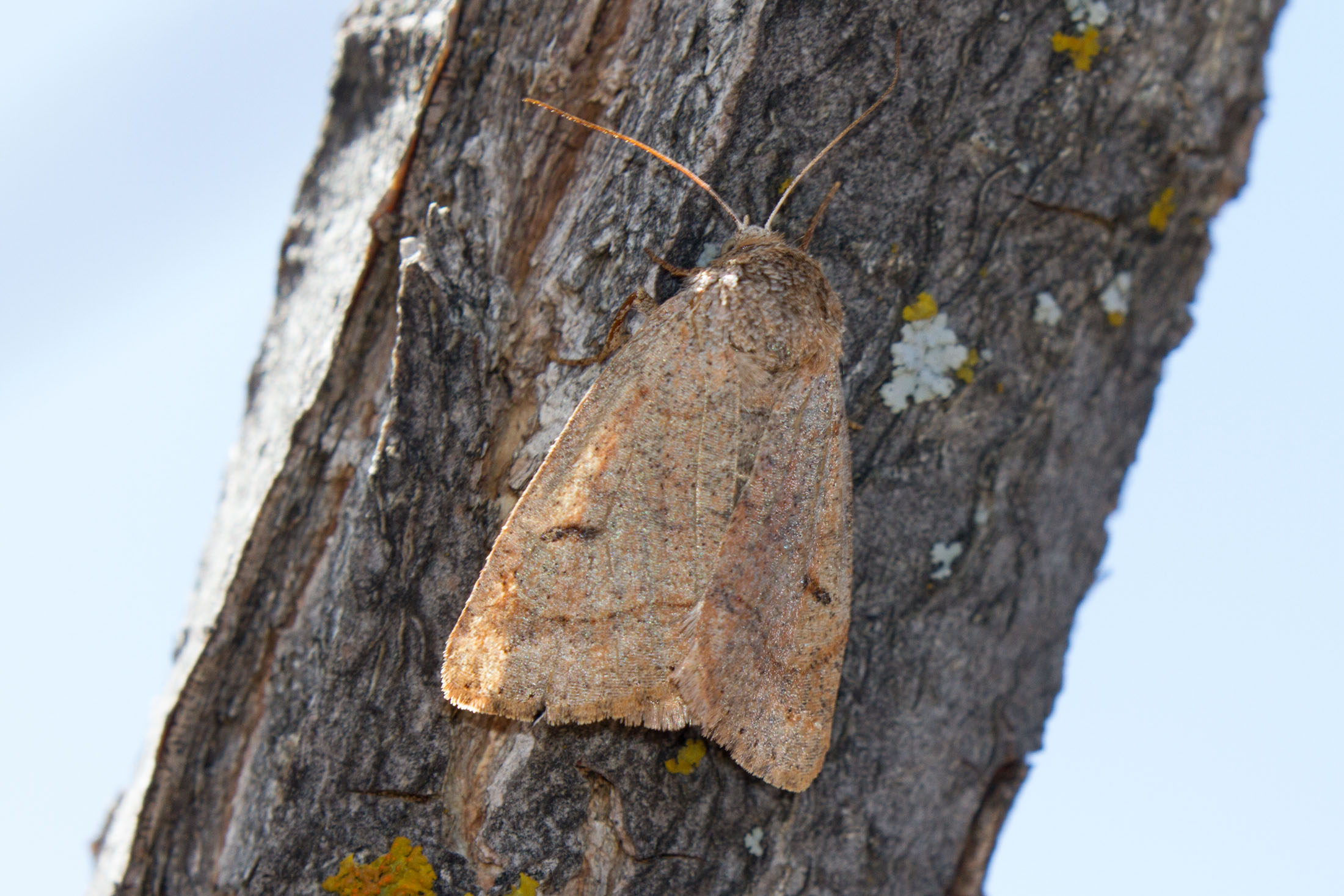
Phoberia ingenua at Black Canyon of the Gunnison National Park, USA

Phoberia ingenua is a species of moth in the family Erebidae. The species is found in eastern North America and flies in March and April of each year. The adult males have bipectinate antennae, which distinguish them from the sister species Phoberia atomaris, whose antennae are smooth.
