= Arrade erebusalis =

Scientific classification
- Kingdom: Animalia
- Phylum: Arthropoda
- Class: Insecta
- Order: Lepidoptera
- Superfamily: Noctuoidea
- Family: Erebidae
- Genus: Arrade
- Species: A. erebusalis

Binomial name
- Arrade erebusalis Walker, 1863

Species of moth

Arrade erebusalis is a moth of the family Erebidae first described by Francis Walker in 1863. It is found in Sri Lanka, Nicobar Islands, Singapore, Borneo, New Guinea, Bismarck Islands and Australia.

Forewings medium gray with a strongly angled and very fine, broken, blackish postmedial.
