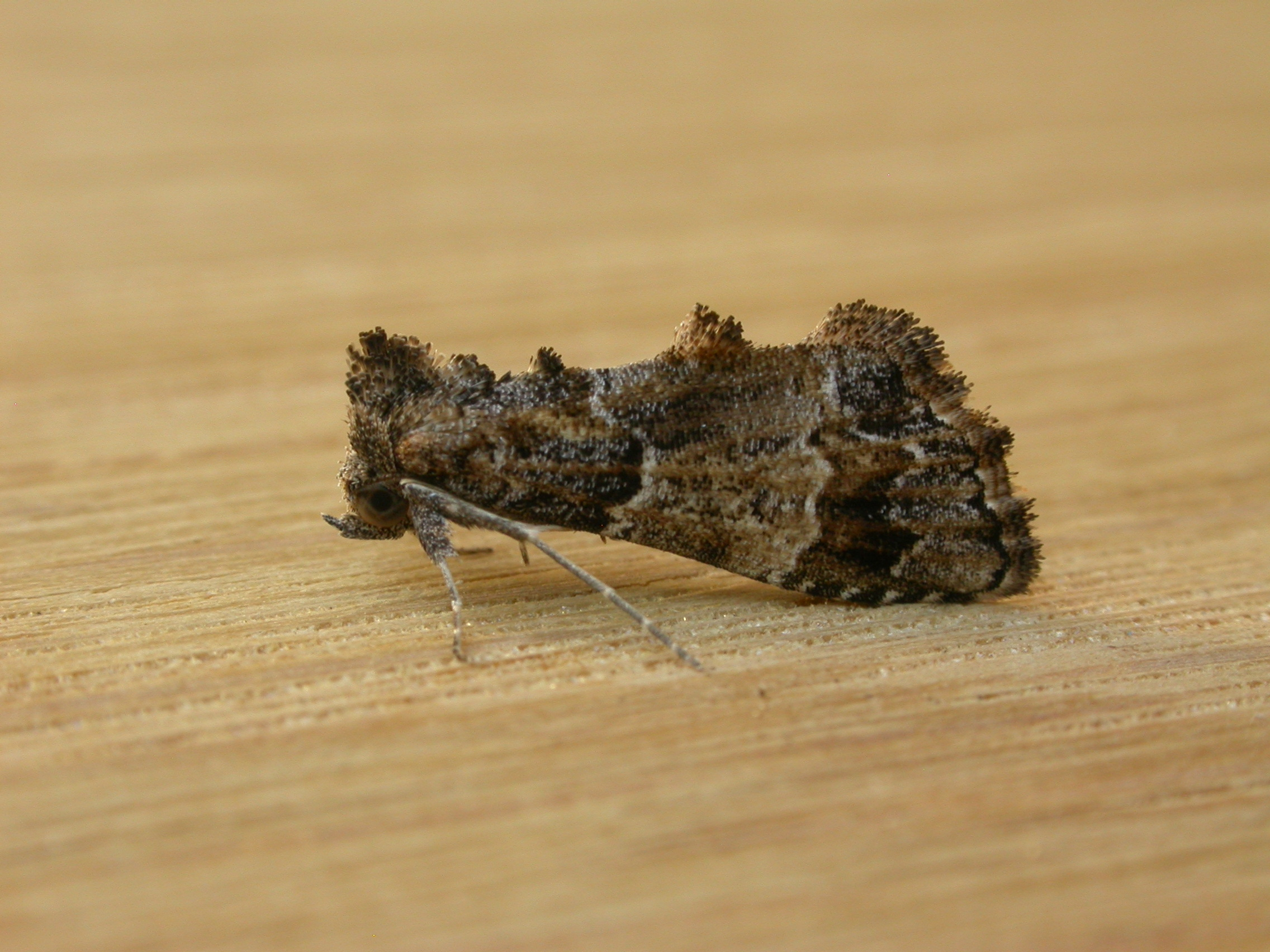

Scientific classification
- Kingdom: Animalia
- Phylum: Arthropoda
- Class: Insecta
- Order: Lepidoptera
- Superfamily: Noctuoidea
- Family: Erebidae
- Genus: Arrade
- Species: A. destituta

Binomial name
- Arrade destituta Walker, 1865

Synonyms
- Erastria destituta

= Arrade destituta =

Species of moth

Arrade destituta is a moth of the family Erebidae first described by Francis Walker in 1865. It is found in Queensland, Australia.
