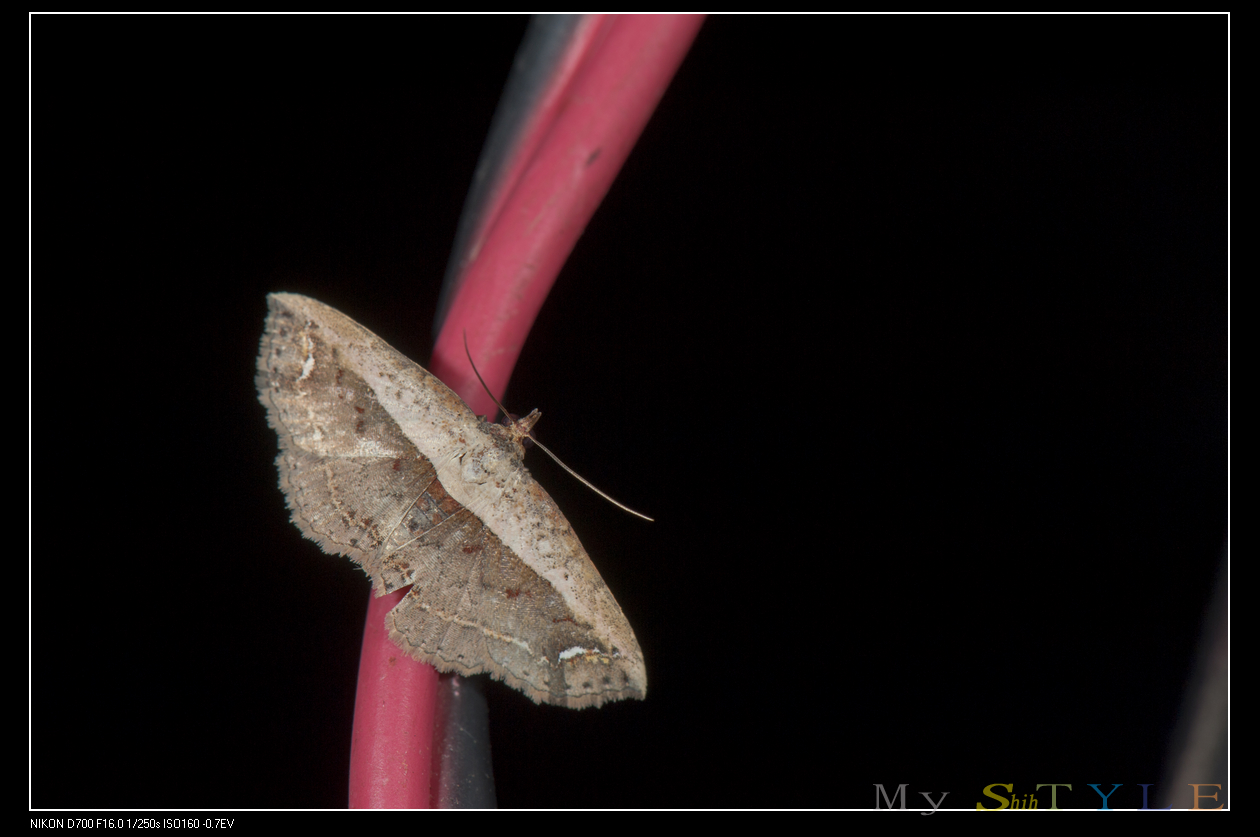

Scientific classification
- Domain: Eukaryota
- Kingdom: Animalia
- Phylum: Arthropoda
- Class: Insecta
- Order: Lepidoptera
- Superfamily: Noctuoidea
- Family: Noctuidae
- Genus: Lophoruza
- Species: L. lunifera

Binomial name
- Lophoruza lunifera (Moore, [1885])

Synonyms
- Mestleta lunifera Moore, [1885]

= Lophoruza lunifera =

Species of moth

Lophoruza lunifera is a moth of the family Noctuidae first described by Frederic Moore in 1885. It is found in Sri Lanka, Japan and Taiwan.

== Gallery ==
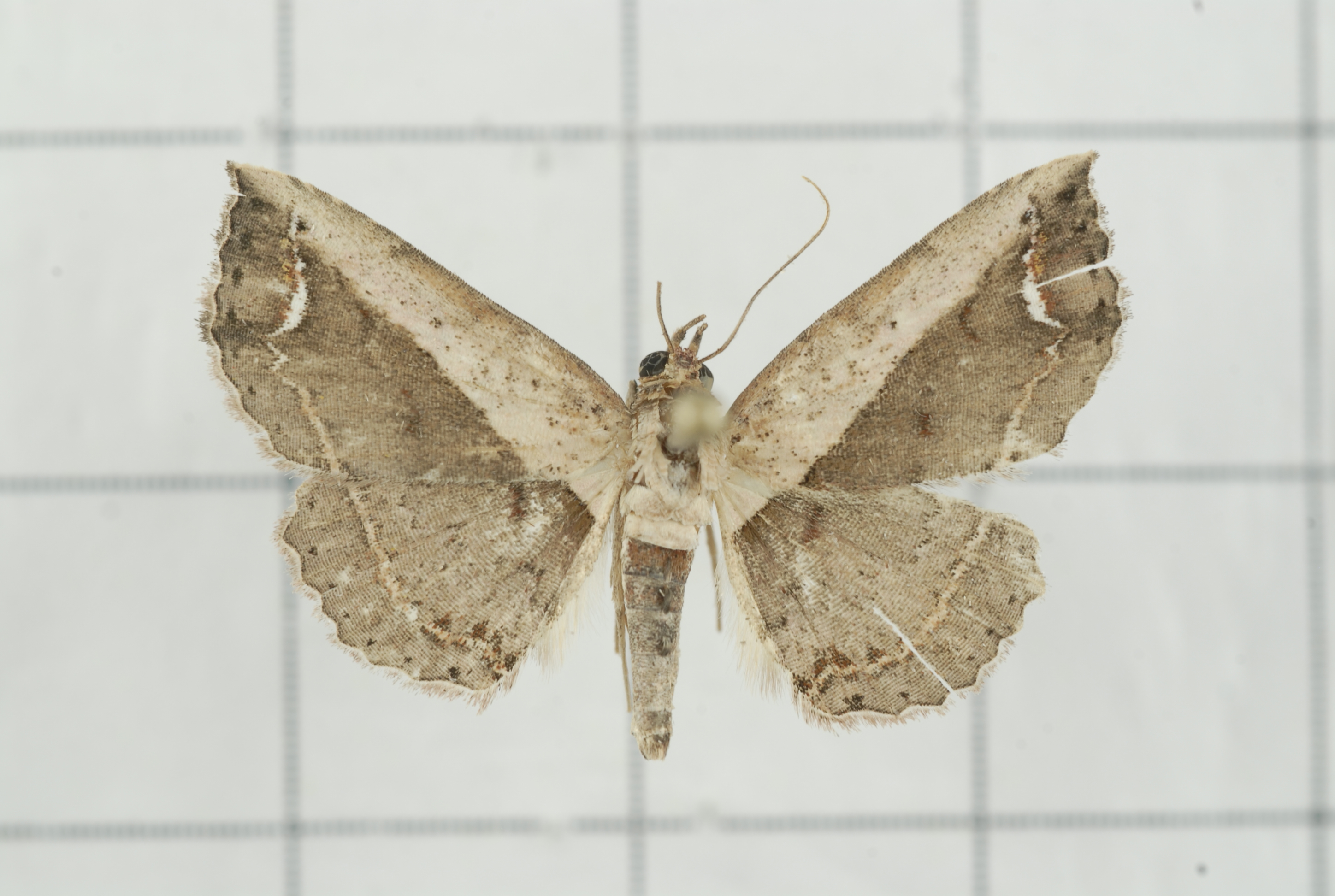

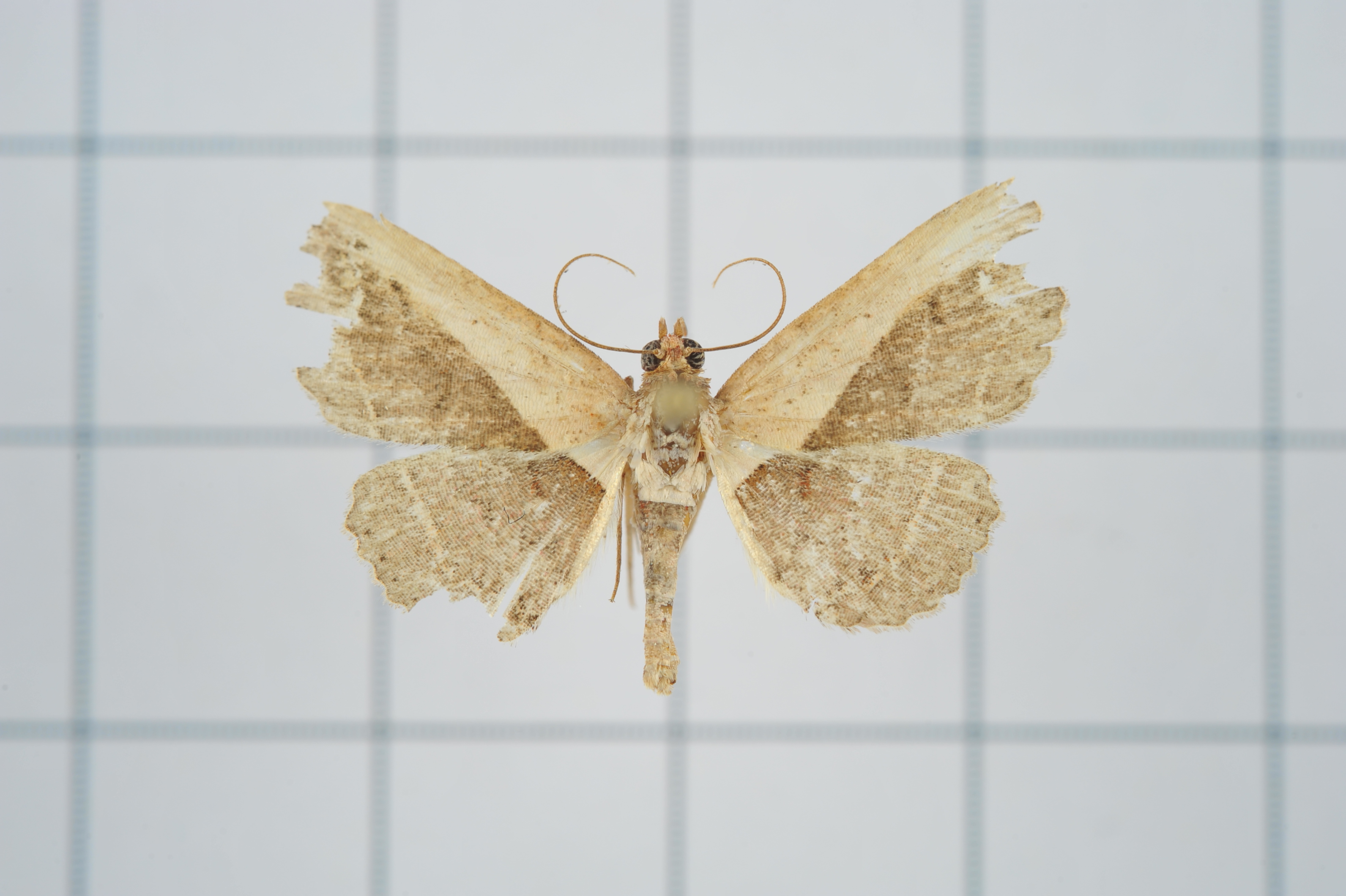

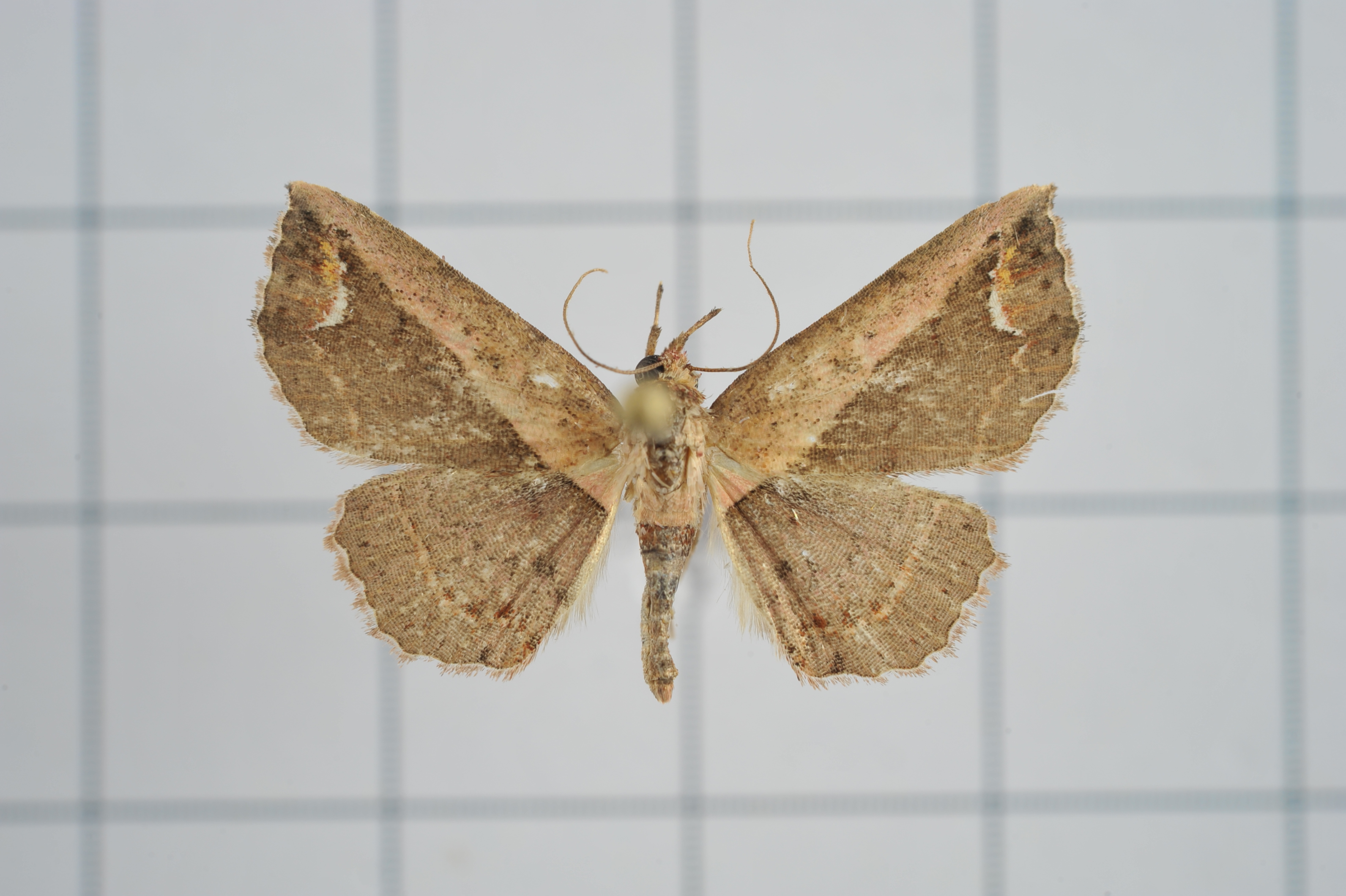

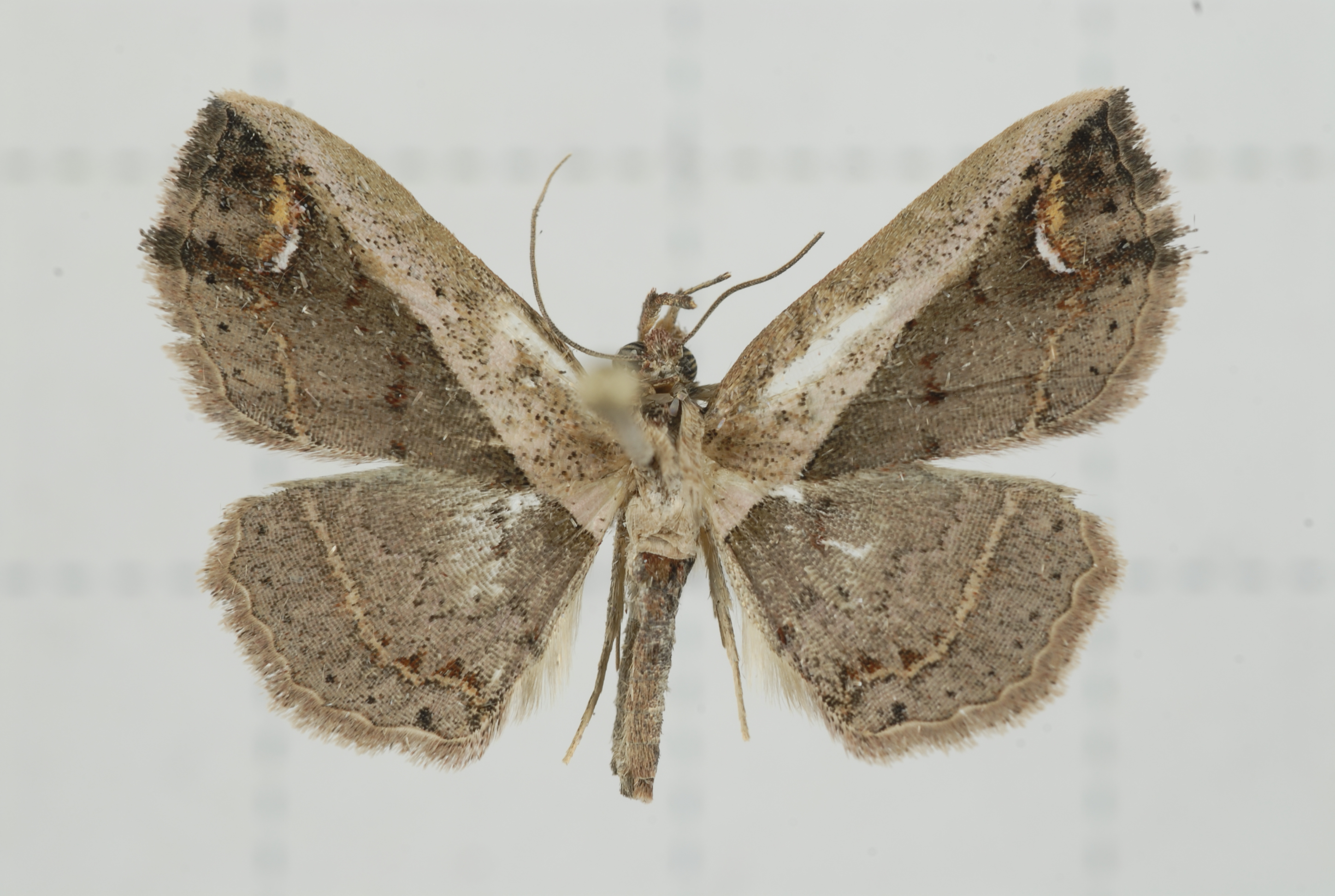
