= Lesmone griseipennis =

Scientific classification
- Domain: Eukaryota
- Kingdom: Animalia
- Phylum: Arthropoda
- Class: Insecta
- Order: Lepidoptera
- Superfamily: Noctuoidea
- Family: Erebidae
- Genus: Lesmone
- Species: L. griseipennis

Binomial name
- Lesmone griseipennis (Grote, 1882)

Species of moth

Lesmone griseipennis, the gray-winged owlet, is a species of moth in the family Erebidae.

The MONA or Hodges number for Lesmone griseipennis is 8654.
