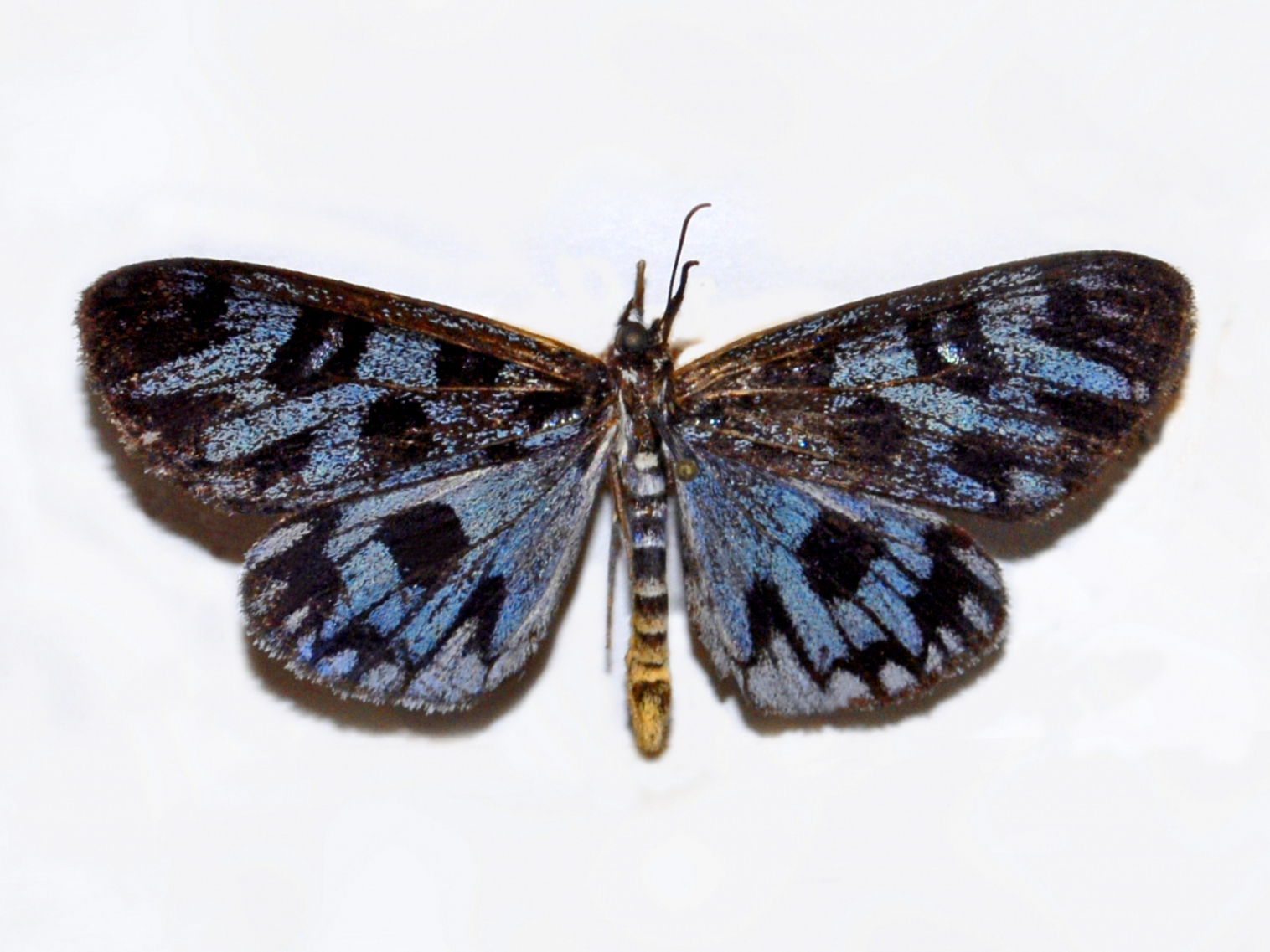
- Mounted specimen from Borneo

Scientific classification
- Kingdom: Animalia
- Phylum: Arthropoda
- Clade: Pancrustacea
- Class: Insecta
- Order: Lepidoptera
- Superfamily: Noctuoidea
- Family: Noctuidae
- Genus: Longicella
- Species: L. mollis

Binomial name
- Longicella mollis (Walker, 1856)

Synonyms
- Eusemia mollis Walker, 1856; Ophthalmis decipiens Butler, 1884

= Longicella mollis =

Species of moth

Longicella mollis is a species of moth of the family Noctuidae first described by Francis Walker in 1856.

== Subspecies ==
- Longicella mollis decipiens Butler, 1884
- Longicella mollis detanii Kishida, 1993
- Longicella mollis mollis Walker, 1856

== Description ==
Longicella mollis has a wingspan reaching about 51 millimetres (2.0 in). The wings are gray blue, with a greenish tinge, black veins, large black spots and irregular black stripes.

== Distribution ==
This species can be found in the Peninsular Malaysia, in Sumatra and in Borneo.
