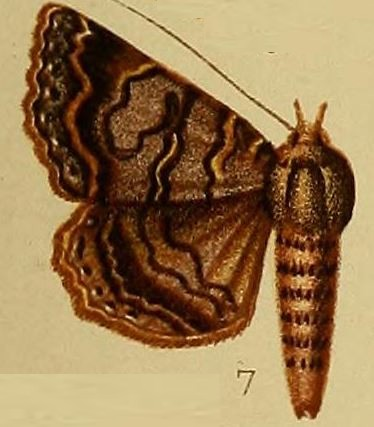

Scientific classification
- Kingdom: Animalia
- Phylum: Arthropoda
- Clade: Pancrustacea
- Class: Insecta
- Order: Lepidoptera
- Superfamily: Noctuoidea
- Family: Erebidae
- Genus: Lophotavia
- Species: L. pulcherrima

Binomial name
- Lophotavia pulcherrima (Holland, 1894)

Synonyms
- Homoptera pulcherrima Holland, 1894; Speiredonia prunicolora Hampson, 1910; Lophotavia prunicolora (Hampson, 1910)

= Lophotavia pulcherrima =

Species of moth

Lophotavia pulcherrima is a moth of the family Erebidae first described by William Jacob Holland in 1894.

== Distribution ==
It is found in Gabon, Ghana, Sierra Leone and Zambia.
