= Lesmone fufius =

Scientific classification
- Kingdom: Animalia
- Phylum: Arthropoda
- Clade: Pancrustacea
- Class: Insecta
- Order: Lepidoptera
- Superfamily: Noctuoidea
- Family: Erebidae
- Genus: Lesmone
- Species: L. fufius

Binomial name
- Lesmone fufius (Schaus, 1894)

Species of moth

Lesmone fufius is a species of moth in the family Erebidae. It is found in North America.

The MONA or Hodges number for Lesmone fufius is 8652.
