= Papuacola lignicolor =

Scientific classification
- Kingdom: Animalia
- Phylum: Arthropoda
- Clade: Pancrustacea
- Class: Insecta
- Order: Lepidoptera
- Superfamily: Noctuoidea
- Family: Erebidae
- Genus: Papuacola
- Species: P. lignicolor

Binomial name
- Papuacola lignicolor Hampson, 1926

Species of moth

Papuacola lignicolor is a moth of the family Noctuidae first described by George Hampson in 1926. It is found in Sumatra, Borneo and Sri Lanka.

The body is fawn colored with grayish shades. Forewing has a narrow, dark brown biarcuate medial band, whitish mark from the reniform at its distal edge.
