= Lesmone hinna =

Scientific classification
- Domain: Eukaryota
- Kingdom: Animalia
- Phylum: Arthropoda
- Class: Insecta
- Order: Lepidoptera
- Superfamily: Noctuoidea
- Family: Erebidae
- Tribe: Omopterini
- Genus: Lesmone
- Species: L. hinna

Binomial name
- Lesmone hinna (Geyer, 1837)

Species of moth

Lesmone hinna is a species of moth in the family Erebidae.

The MONA or Hodges number for Lesmone hinna is 8653.
