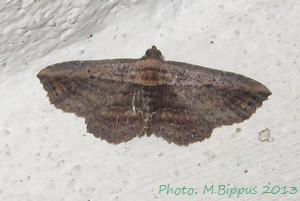

Scientific classification
- Domain: Eukaryota
- Kingdom: Animalia
- Phylum: Arthropoda
- Class: Insecta
- Order: Lepidoptera
- Superfamily: Noctuoidea
- Family: Noctuidae
- Genus: Lophoruza
- Species: L. mascarena

Binomial name
- Lophoruza mascarena de Joannis, 1910

= Lophoruza mascarena =

Species of moth

Lophoruza mascarena is a moth of the family Noctuidae first described by Joseph de Joannis in 1910. It is found on Mauritius and Réunion.

Afromoths gives this name as a synonym of Lophoruza affulgens (Saalmüller, 1881).

Its basic colour is dark brown with a transversal clear-brown/beige stripe. Its wingspan is 24 mm for females and 21 mm for males.
