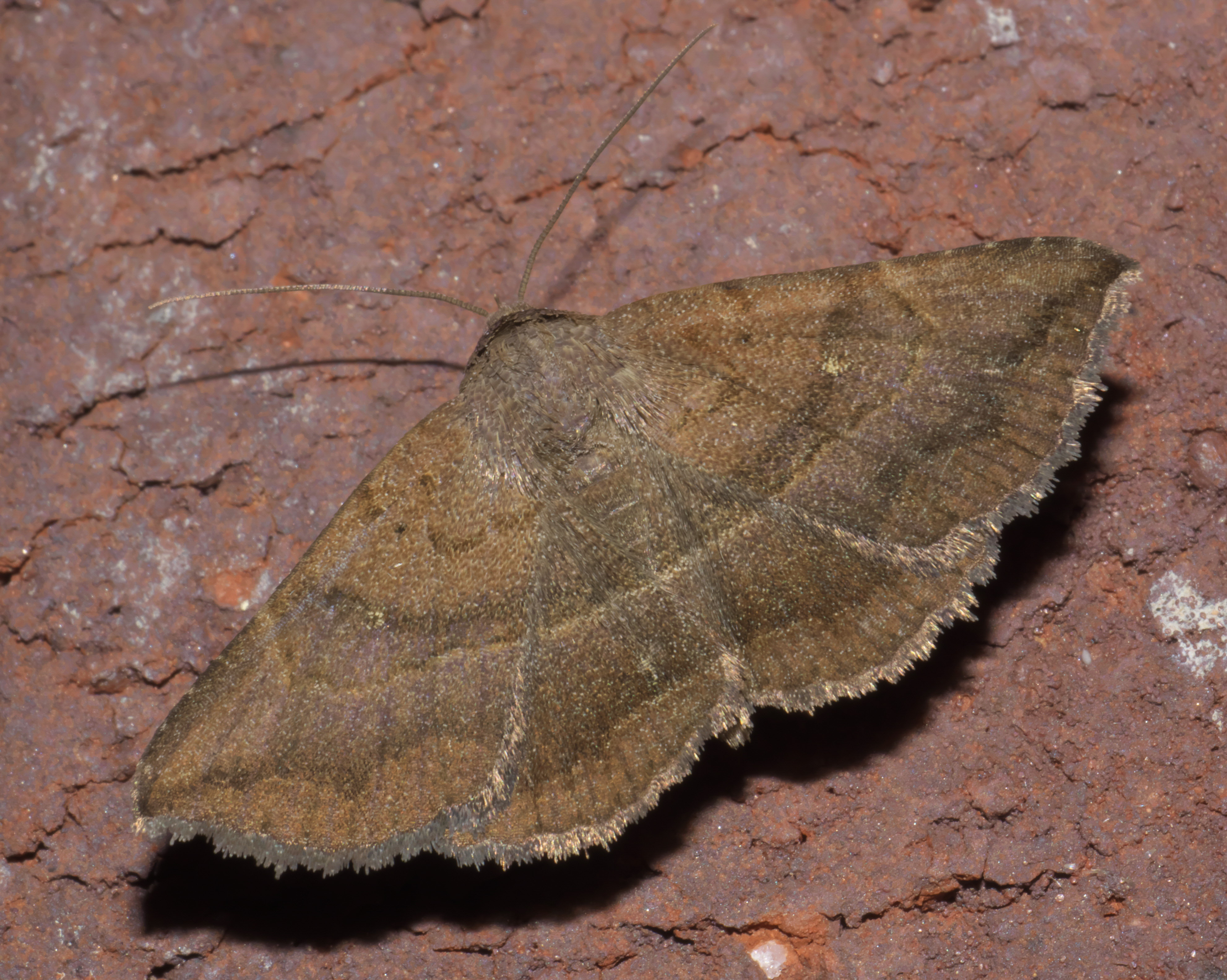

Scientific classification
- Kingdom: Animalia
- Phylum: Arthropoda
- Class: Insecta
- Order: Lepidoptera
- Superfamily: Noctuoidea
- Family: Erebidae
- Tribe: Omopterini
- Genus: Lesmone
- Species: L. detrahens

Binomial name
- Lesmone detrahens (Walker, 1858)

= Lesmone detrahens =

Species of moth

Lesmone detrahens, the detracted owlet, is an owlet moth in the family Erebidae. The species was first described by Francis Walker in 1858.

The MONA or Hodges number for Lesmone detrahens is 8651.

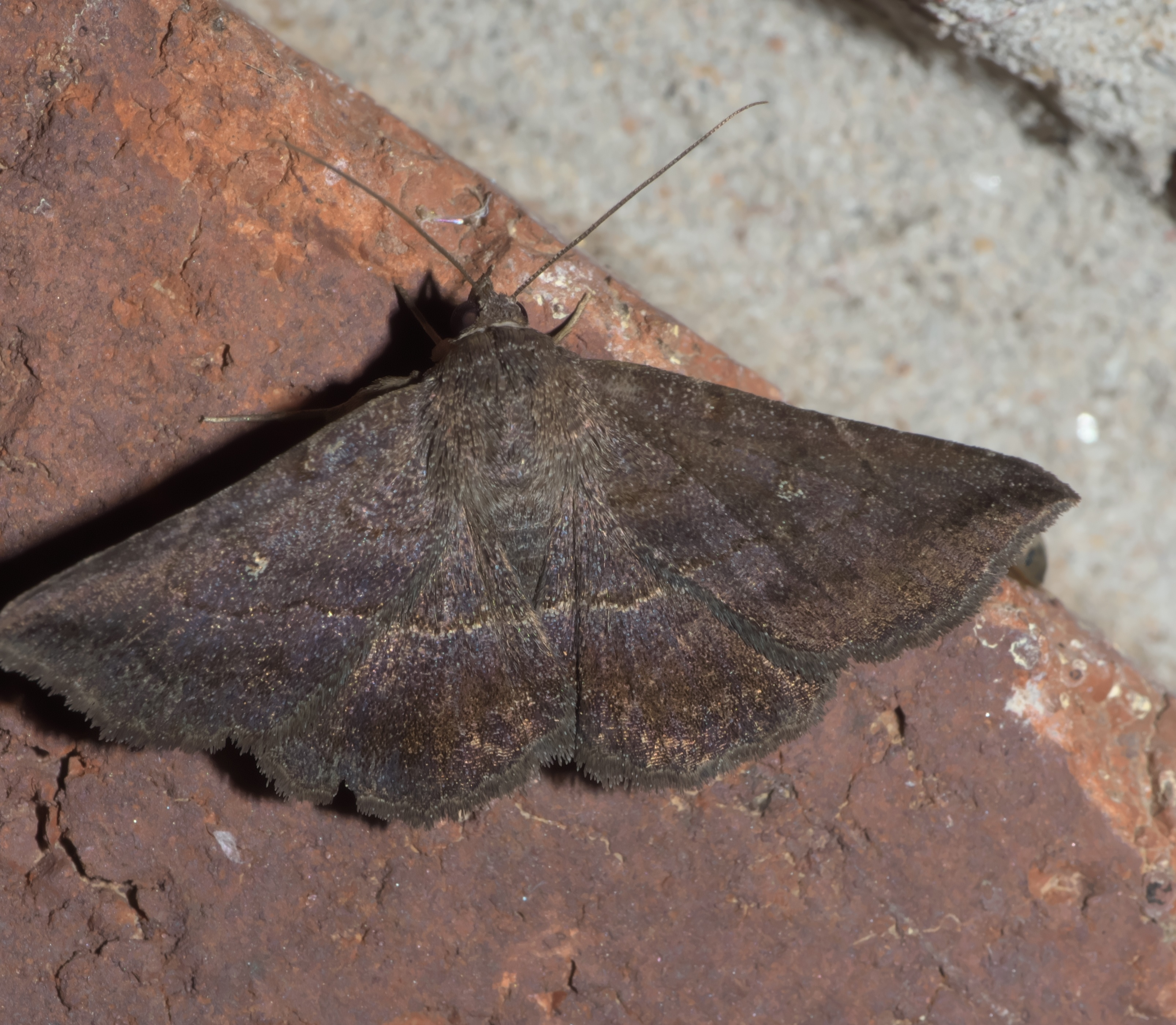
Detracted owlet, Lesmone detrahens
