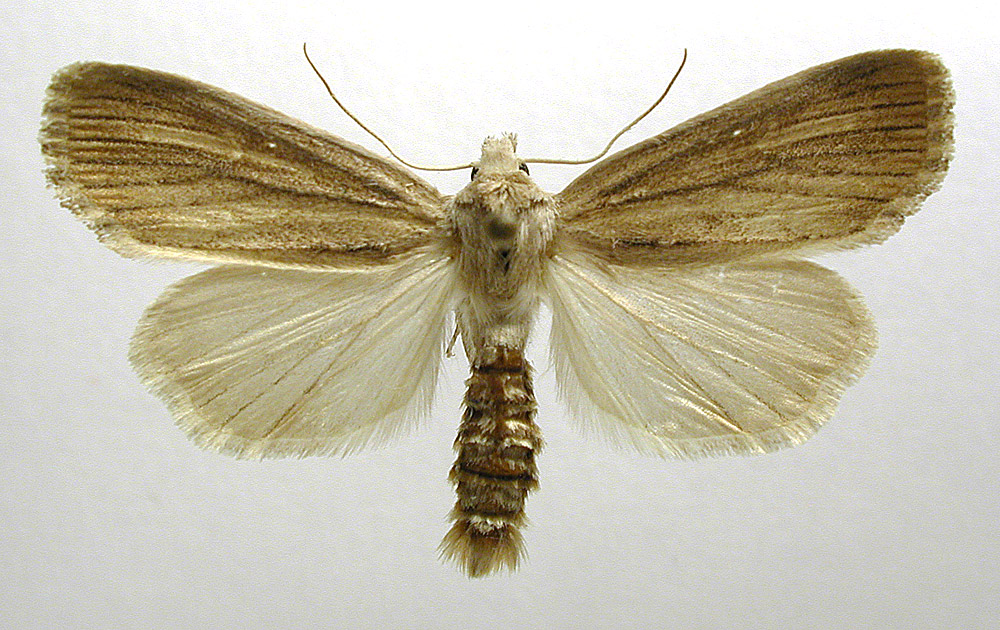

Scientific classification
- Domain: Eukaryota
- Kingdom: Animalia
- Phylum: Arthropoda
- Class: Insecta
- Order: Lepidoptera
- Superfamily: Noctuoidea
- Family: Noctuidae
- Genus: Longalatedes
- Species: L. elymi

Binomial name
- Longalatedes elymi (Treitschke, 1825)

Synonyms
- Leucania elymi Treitschke, 1825; Chortodes elymi (Treitschke, 1825); Arenostola elymi (Treitschke, 1825); Photedes elymi (Treitschke, 1825); Tapinostola procera Staudinger, 1889; Tapinostola procera var. saturatior Staudinger, 1889; Tapinostola elymi r. askoldensis Turner, 1929; Arenostola punctivena Draudt, 1950

= Longalatedes elymi =

Species of moth

The Lyme grass (Longalatedes elymi) is a species of moth of the family Noctuidae. It is found along the coasts of southern Sweden, southern Finland, Denmark, Estonia, northern Poland, northern Germany and eastern Great Britain.

== Technical description and variation ==
Forewing bone colour, tinged with pale brownish between the veins; the veins a little darker; outer line indicated by a double row of dark spots; hindwing luteous white; ab. saturatior Stgr. is deeper brown. Larva bone colour, sometimes with a yellow or reddish tinge; head reddish brown. The wingspan is about 36 mm.

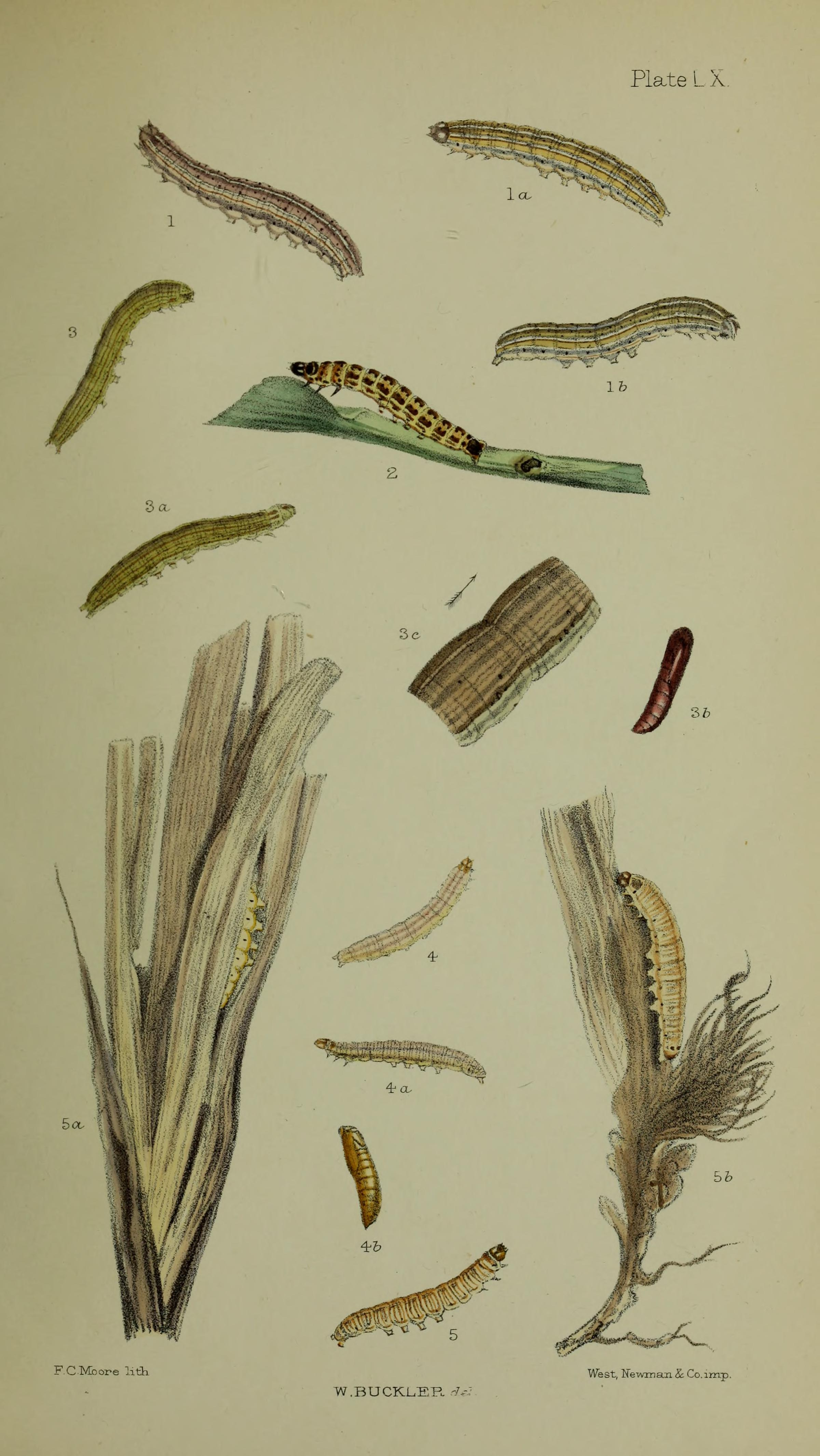
Fig 5 larva after last moult 5a, 5b adult larvae on their foodplant (Elymus arenarius)

== Biology ==
Adults are on wing from June to August.

The larvae feed on Elymus arenarius. They feed inside the stem of their host plant, usually below the surface of the sand.
