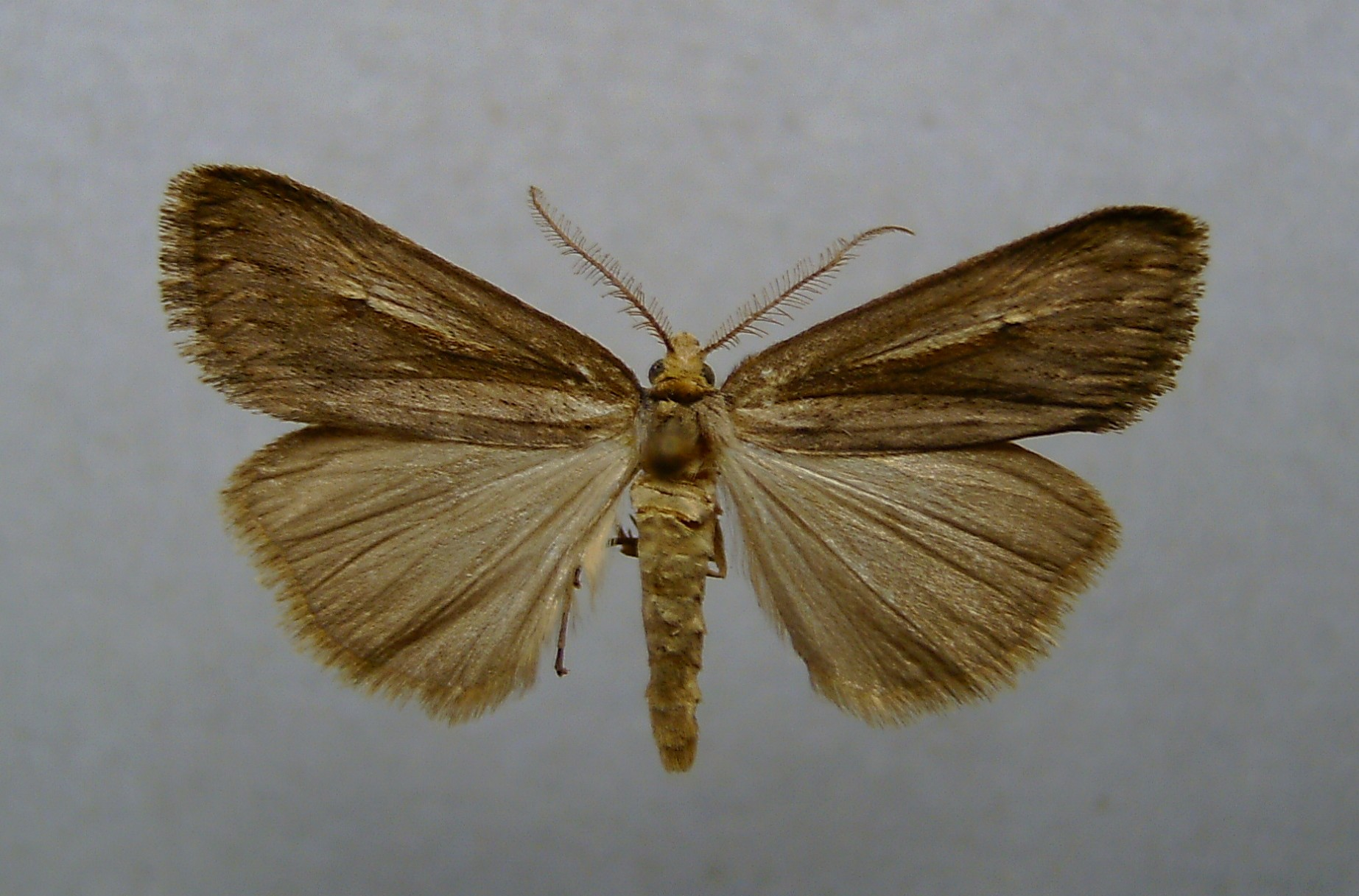
- Male

Scientific classification
- Kingdom: Animalia
- Phylum: Arthropoda
- Clade: Pancrustacea
- Class: Insecta
- Order: Lepidoptera
- Superfamily: Noctuoidea
- Family: Noctuidae
- Genus: Stilbina
- Species: S. olympica

Binomial name
- Stilbina olympica Dierl & Povolný, 1970

= Stilbina olympica =

Species of moth

Stilbina olympica is a moth of the family Noctuidae. It is found in Greece.

The wingspan is 25–35 mm. There is one generation per year, with adults on wing from September to October.

The larvae feed on various grasses and have been reared on Lolium perenne.
