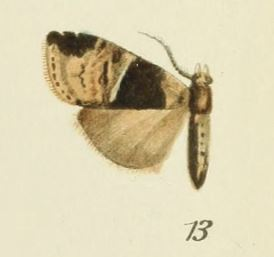

Scientific classification
- Kingdom: Animalia
- Phylum: Arthropoda
- Clade: Pancrustacea
- Class: Insecta
- Order: Lepidoptera
- Superfamily: Noctuoidea
- Family: Scranciidae
- Genus: Gargettoscrancia; Strand, 1912
- Species: G. albolineata

Binomial name
- Gargettoscrancia albolineata (Strand, 1912)

Synonyms
- Scrancia (Gargettoscrancia) albolineata Strand, 1912

= Gargettoscrancia =

Genus of moths

Gargettoscrancia is a monotypic moth genus in the family of Scranciidae. The genus was previously placed in family Notodontidae. Its only species, Gargettoscrancia albolineata, is found in Equatorial Guinea and Ivory Coast. Both the genus and species were first described by Embrik Strand in 1912.
