= Chytonidia =

Scientific classification
- Domain: Eukaryota
- Kingdom: Animalia
- Phylum: Arthropoda
- Class: Insecta
- Order: Lepidoptera
- Superfamily: Noctuoidea
- Family: Noctuidae
- Subfamily: Acronictinae
- Genus: Chytonidia; Schaus, 1914

Genus of moths

Chytonidia is a genus of moths of the family Noctuidae. The genus was described by William Schaus in 1914.

== Taxonomy ==
Lepidoptera and Some Other Life Forms gives this name as a synonym of Leucosigma H. Druce, 1908.

== Species ==
- Chytonidia albiplaga Hampson, 1914
- Chytonidia chloristis Schaus, 1914
- Chytonidia variegata Wileman, 1914
