= Neoptista =

Scientific classification
- Domain: Eukaryota
- Kingdom: Animalia
- Phylum: Arthropoda
- Class: Insecta
- Order: Lepidoptera
- Superfamily: Noctuoidea
- Family: Erebidae
- Subfamily: Herminiinae
- Genus: Neoptista; Schaus, 1916

Genus of moths

Neoptista is a genus of moths of the family Erebidae. The genus was described by William Schaus in 1916.

The Global Lepidoptera Names Index gives this name as a synonym of Lepteria Schaus, 1913.

== Species ==
- Neoptista lorna (Schaus, 1904) Brazil
- Neoptista villalis Schaus, 1916 Mexico
