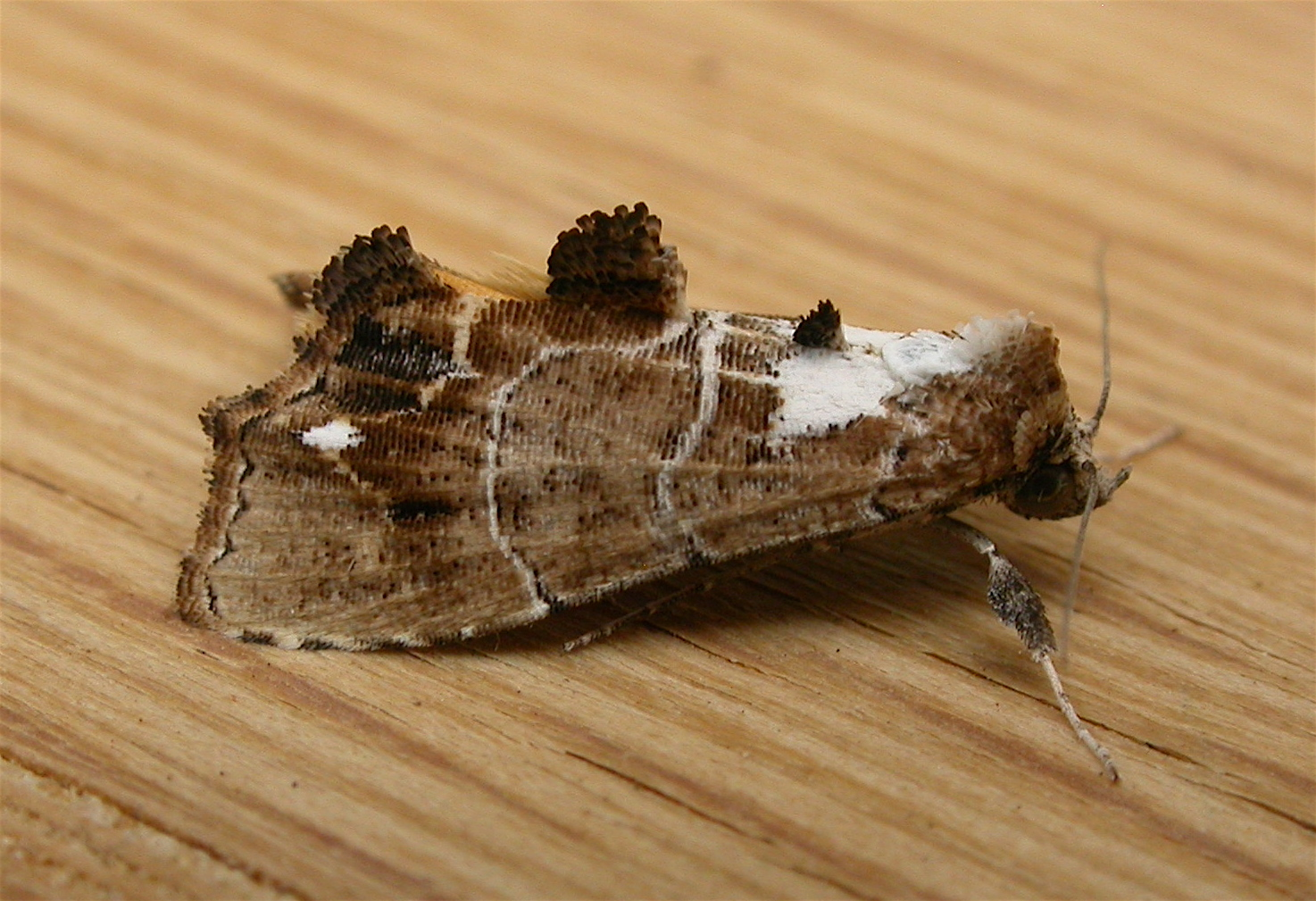

Scientific classification
- Kingdom: Animalia
- Phylum: Arthropoda
- Class: Insecta
- Order: Lepidoptera
- Superfamily: Noctuoidea
- Family: Erebidae
- Genus: Arrade
- Species: A. leucocosmalis

Binomial name
- Arrade leucocosmalis Walker, 1863

Synonyms
- Larassa condecoralis; Madoce leucocosmalis Walker, 1863

= Arrade leucocosmalis =

Species of moth

Arrade leucocosmalis, the garden snout, is a moth of the family Erebidae. The species was first described by Francis Walker in 1863. It is found in Victoria, Australia.

The wingspan is about 20 mm.
