= Papuacola =

Scientific classification
- Kingdom: Animalia
- Phylum: Arthropoda
- Class: Insecta
- Order: Lepidoptera
- Superfamily: Noctuoidea
- Family: Erebidae
- Subfamily: Calpinae
- Genus: Papuacola; Hampson, 1926

Synonyms
- Leptotroga Hampson, 1926

Genus of moths

Papuacola is a genus of moths of the family Erebidae. The genus was erected by George Hampson in 1926.

== Species ==
- Papuacola albisigillata (Warren, 1903) New Guinea, Sulawesi, Sumatra, Borneo
- Papuacola costalis (Moore, 1883) Andamans, Java, Sumatra, Borneo, Moluccas, New Guinea, Queensland, Bismarcks, Solomons, Fiji, Rotuma, New Caledonia, Samoa
- Papuacola gemina (Fabricius, 1794) India, Peninsular Malaysia, Sumatra, Bali, Borneo, Sulawesi, New Guinea
