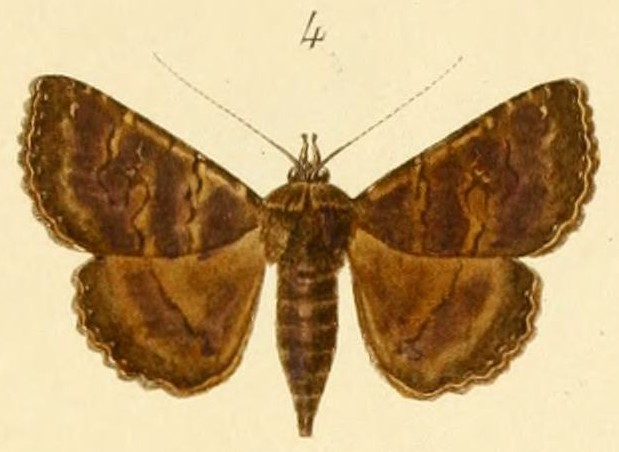

Scientific classification
- Kingdom: Animalia
- Phylum: Arthropoda
- Class: Insecta
- Order: Lepidoptera
- Superfamily: Noctuoidea
- Family: Erebidae
- Genus: Lophotavia
- Species: L. incivilis

Binomial name
- Lophotavia incivilis (Walker, 1865)

Synonyms
- Brujas incivilis Walker, 1865; Diatenes merulina Mabille, 1890; Polydesma nigrocyanea de Joannis, 1906

= Lophotavia incivilis =

Species of moth

Lophotavia incivilis is a moth of the family Erebidae. It is found in Somalia, Eritrea, Madagascar and Mauritius.

The adults have a wingspan of 35 mm.
