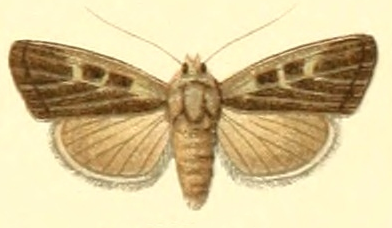

Scientific classification
- Domain: Eukaryota
- Kingdom: Animalia
- Phylum: Arthropoda
- Class: Insecta
- Order: Lepidoptera
- Superfamily: Noctuoidea
- Family: Noctuidae
- Genus: Ledereragrotis
- Species: L. difficilis

Binomial name
- Ledereragrotis difficilis (Erschoff, 1887)

Synonyms
- Euxoa difficilis (Erschoff, 1887); Actebia difficilis

= Ledereragrotis difficilis =

Species of moth

Ledereragrotis difficilis is a moth of the family Noctuidae. It is found in Mongolia and southern Siberia.

The length of the fore wings is about 15 mm.
