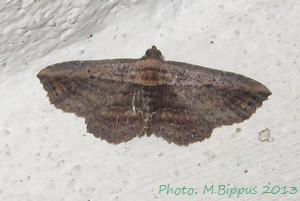
- Lophoruza mascarena

Scientific classification
- Kingdom: Animalia
- Phylum: Arthropoda
- Class: Insecta
- Order: Lepidoptera
- Superfamily: Noctuoidea
- Family: Noctuidae
- Subfamily: Acontiinae
- Genus: Lophoruza; Hampson, 1910

Synonyms
- Eugnathia Warren, 1912; Lophograpta Warren, 1913; Bathystolma Turner, 1932

= Lophoruza =

Genus of moths

Lophoruza is a genus of moths of the family Noctuidae. The genus was erected by George Hampson in 1910.

== Species ==
- Lophoruza albicostalis (Leech, 1889)
- Lophoruza albisecta (Warren, 1912)
- Lophoruza apiciplaga (Warren, 1913)
- Lophoruza bella (Bethune-Baker, 1906)
- Lophoruza chalcocosma Turner, 1945
- Lophoruza cithara (Swinhoe, 1902)
- Lophoruza consors (Warren, 1913)
- Lophoruza diagonalis Hampson, 1910
- Lophoruza diversalis (Walker, [1868])
- Lophoruza jugosa (Swinhoe, 1902)
- Lophoruza longipalpis (Walker, 1865)
- Lophoruza lunifera (Moore, [1885])
- Lophoruza mascarena de Joannis, 1910
- Lophoruza mobdosticha Turner, 1945
- Lophoruza pulcherrima (Butler, 1879)
- Lophoruza purpureogrisea (Warren, 1913)
- Lophoruza roseoliva (Warren, 1913)
- Lophoruza rubrimacula Prout, 1921
- Lophoruza semicervina (Warren, 1913)
- Lophoruza semiscripta (Mabille, 1893)
- Lophoruza tamsi Roepke, 1938
- Lophoruza vacillatrix Hampson, 1910
- Lophoruza xylonota (Lower, 1903)
