= Lophocerynea =

Scientific classification
- Kingdom: Animalia
- Phylum: Arthropoda
- Class: Insecta
- Order: Lepidoptera
- Superfamily: Noctuoidea
- Family: Noctuidae
- Subfamily: Acontiinae
- Genus: Lophocerynea; Hampson, 1918
- Species: L. punctata

Binomial name
- Lophocerynea punctata (Bethune-Baker, 1906)

Synonyms
- Phanaspa punctata Bethune-Baker, 1906

Genus of moths

Lophocerynea is a monotypic moth genus of the family Noctuidae erected by George Hampson in 1918. Its only species, Lophocerynea punctata, was first described by George Thomas Bethune-Baker in 1906. It is found in New Guinea.
