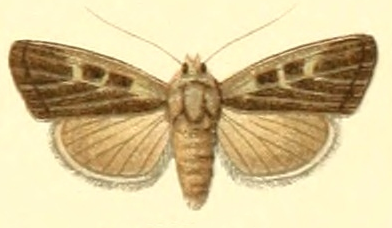

Scientific classification
- Domain: Eukaryota
- Kingdom: Animalia
- Phylum: Arthropoda
- Class: Insecta
- Order: Lepidoptera
- Superfamily: Noctuoidea
- Family: Noctuidae
- Subfamily: Noctuinae
- Genus: Ledereragrotis; Varga, 1991

= Ledereragrotis =

Genus of moths

Ledereragrotis is a genus of moths of the family Noctuidae.

== Species ==
- Ledereragrotis difficilis (Erschoff, 1887)
- Ledereragrotis multifida (Lederer, 1870)
