= Leucatomis =

Scientific classification
- Domain: Eukaryota
- Kingdom: Animalia
- Phylum: Arthropoda
- Class: Insecta
- Order: Lepidoptera
- Superfamily: Noctuoidea
- Family: Erebidae
- Subfamily: Herminiinae
- Genus: Leucatomis; Dognin, 1914
- Species: L. incondita

Binomial name
- Leucatomis incondita Dognin, 1914

Genus of moths

Leucatomis is a monotypic moth genus of the family Noctuidae. Its only species, Leucatomis incondita, is found in French Guiana. Both the genus and species were first described by Paul Dognin in 1914.
