= Leucotelia =

Scientific classification
- Kingdom: Animalia
- Phylum: Arthropoda
- Class: Insecta
- Order: Lepidoptera
- Superfamily: Noctuoidea
- Family: Erebidae
- Subfamily: Calpinae
- Genus: Leucotelia; Hampson, 1926
- Species: L. ochreoplagata

Binomial name
- Leucotelia ochreoplagata (Kenrick, 1917)

Synonyms
- Eutelia ochreoplagata Kenrick, 1917

Genus of moths

Leucotelia is a monotypic moth genus of the family Erebidae erected by George Hampson in 1926. Its only species, Leucotelia ochreoplagata, was first described by George Hamilton Kenrick in 1917. It is found on Madagascar.

This species has a wingspan of 33 mm.
