= Leucogramma =

Scientific classification
- Kingdom: Animalia
- Phylum: Arthropoda
- Class: Insecta
- Order: Lepidoptera
- Superfamily: Noctuoidea
- Family: Noctuidae (?)
- Subfamily: Catocalinae
- Genus: Leucogramma; Hampson, 1926

Genus of moths

Leucogramma is a genus of moths of the family Noctuidae. The genus was erected by George Hampson in 1926.

== Species ==
- Leucogramma hypenoides Schaus, 1906
- Leucogramma niveilinea Schaus, 1894
