= Latirostrum =

Scientific classification
- Kingdom: Animalia
- Phylum: Arthropoda
- Class: Insecta
- Order: Lepidoptera
- Superfamily: Noctuoidea
- Family: Erebidae
- Subfamily: Calpinae
- Genus: Latirostrum; Hampson, 1895
- Species: L. bisacutum

Binomial name
- Latirostrum bisacutum Hampson, 1895

Synonyms
- Latirostrum japonicum Miyake, 1909

Genus of moths

Latirostrum is a monotypic moth genus of the family Erebidae. Its only species, Latirostrum bisacutum, is found in Japan and Uttar Pradesh, India. Both the genus and species were first described by George Hampson in 1895.
