= Lepteria =

Scientific classification
- Domain: Eukaryota
- Kingdom: Animalia
- Phylum: Arthropoda
- Class: Insecta
- Order: Lepidoptera
- Superfamily: Noctuoidea
- Family: Noctuidae
- Subfamily: Noctuinae
- Genus: Lepteria; Schaus, 1913

Synonyms
- Neoptista Schaus, 1916

Genus of moths

Lepteria is a genus of moths of the family Noctuidae. The genus was described by William Schaus in 1913.

== Species ==
- Lepteria lorna Schaus, 1904
- Lepteria parallela Dognin, 1914
- Lepteria sacraria Hampson, 1918
- Lepteria villalis Schaus, 1916
- Lepteria viridicosta Schaus, 1912
