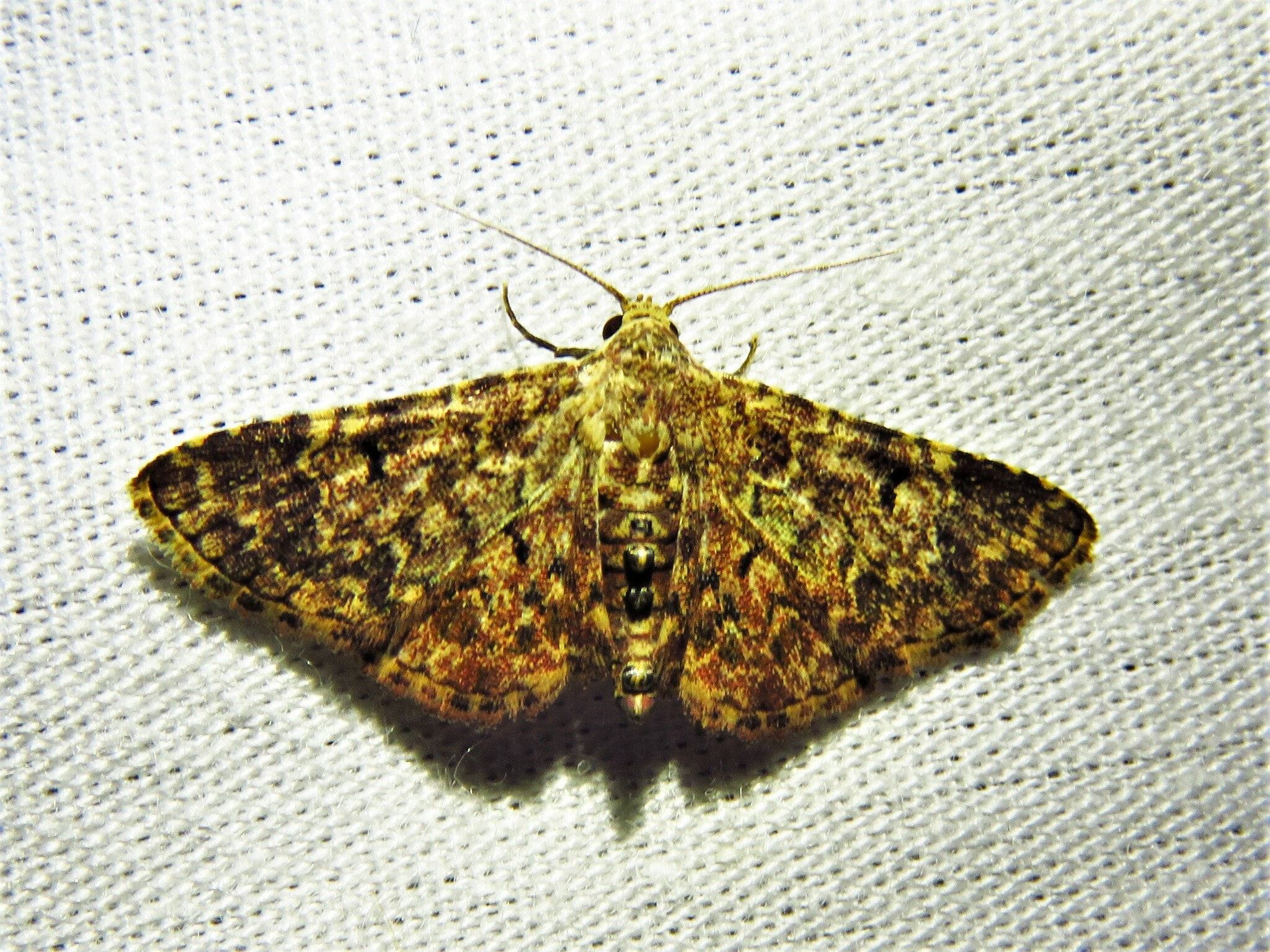
- Lamprolopha phaeomicta

Scientific classification
- Kingdom: Animalia
- Phylum: Arthropoda
- Class: Insecta
- Order: Lepidoptera
- Superfamily: Noctuoidea
- Family: Noctuidae
- Genus: Lamprolopha; Hampson, 1914

= Lamprolopha =

Genus of moths

Lamprolopha is a genus of moths in the family Noctuidae. The genus was erected by George Hampson in 1914.

== Species ==
- Lamprolopha daloa Hacker, 2019 Ivory Coast
- Lamprolopha eupithecica Hacker, 2019 Liberia
- Lamprolopha ferruginosa Hacker, 2019 Tanzania
- Lamprolopha gigantea Hacker, 2019 Ivory Coast, Nigeria, Gabon
- Lamprolopha kononenkoi (Hacker, 2016) Burkina Faso, Tanzania, Yemen
- Lamprolopha melanephra Hampson, 1914 Ivory Coast, Liberia, Ghana, Nigeria, Cameroon, Equatorial Guinea, Gabon, Uganda, Kenya, Malawi, Tanzania
- Lamprolopha parascotoides Hacker, 2019 Gabon, Guinea
- Lamprolopha phaeomicta (Hampson, 1918) Malawi, Tanzania
- Lamprolopha rolandi Hacker, 2019 South Africa
