= Libystica =

Scientific classification
- Kingdom: Animalia
- Phylum: Arthropoda
- Class: Insecta
- Order: Lepidoptera
- Superfamily: Noctuoidea
- Family: Noctuidae (?)
- Subfamily: Catocalinae
- Genus: Libystica; Hampson, 1926

Genus of moths

Libystica is a genus of moths of the family Noctuidae. The genus was erected by George Hampson in 1926.

== Species ==
- Libystica costalis Walker, 1865
- Libystica crenata Hampson, 1926
- Libystica eucampima Hampson, 1926
- Libystica lunaris Gaede, 1940
- Libystica simplex Holland, 1894
- Libystica succedens Gaede, 1940
- Libystica woerdenialis Snellen, 1872
