= Loboplusia =

Scientific classification
- Domain: Eukaryota
- Kingdom: Animalia
- Phylum: Arthropoda
- Class: Insecta
- Order: Lepidoptera
- Superfamily: Noctuoidea
- Family: Noctuidae
- Subfamily: Plusiinae
- Genus: Loboplusia; Roepke, 1941

Genus of moths

Loboplusia is a genus of moths of the family Noctuidae.

== Species ==
- Loboplusia vanderweelei Roepke, 1941
