= Scranciidae =

Scientific classification
- Kingdom: Animalia
- Phylum: Arthropoda
- Clade: Pancrustacea
- Class: Insecta
- Order: Lepidoptera
- Superfamily: Noctuoidea
- Family: Scranciidae; Miller, 1991

Family of moths

Scranciidae is a family of noctuoid moths. The family was resurrected in 2024 for some genera that were previously placed in family Notodontidae. According to the Global Lepidoptera Index, the family contains 22 genera and 124 species.

== Genera ==
The family includes the following genera:

- Archistilbia Kiriakoff, 1954 (4 spp.)
- Dinotodonta Holland, 1893 (1 spp.))
- Gargetta Walker, 1865 (14 spp.)
- Gargettoscrancia Strand, 1912 (1 spp.)
- Hijracona Holloway, 2011 (1 spp.)
- Lamoriodes Hampson, 1910 (2 spp.)
- Lasioceros Bethune-Baker, 1904 (6 spp.)
- Leptonadatoides Kiriakoff, 1969 (1 spp.)
- Lomela Kiriakoff, 1962 (1 spp.)
- Malgadonta Kiriakoff, 1962 (2 spp.)
- Noctuola Schintlmeister, 2020 (1 spp.)
- Parascrancia Kiriakoff, 1969 (1 spp.)
- Phycidopsis Hampson, 1893 (5 spp.)
- Phycitimorpha Janse, 1920 (4 spp.)
- Postscrancia Schintlmeister & Witt, 2015 (1 spp.)
- Pseudoscrancia Strand, 1915 (1 spp.)
- Scaeopteryx Kiriakoff, 1963 (1 spp.)
- Scranciella Kiriakoff, 1967 (1 spp.)
- Stictogargetta Kiriakoff, 1968 (2 spp.)
- Subscrancia Gaede, 1928 (3 spp.)
- Thacona Walker, 1865 (70 spp.)
- Turnacoides Gaede, 1928 (1 spp.)
