= Lophopanilla =

Scientific classification
- Kingdom: Animalia
- Phylum: Arthropoda
- Class: Insecta
- Order: Lepidoptera
- Superfamily: Noctuoidea
- Family: Erebidae
- Subfamily: Calpinae
- Genus: Lophopanilla; Hampson, 1926
- Species: L. obscurissima

Binomial name
- Lophopanilla obscurissima (Holland, 1894)

Synonyms
- Panilla obscurissima Holland, 1894

Genus of moths

Lophopanilla is a monotypic moth genus of the family Erebidae erected by George Hampson in 1926. Its only species, Lophopanilla obscurissima, was first described by William Jacob Holland in 1894. It is found in Gabon.
