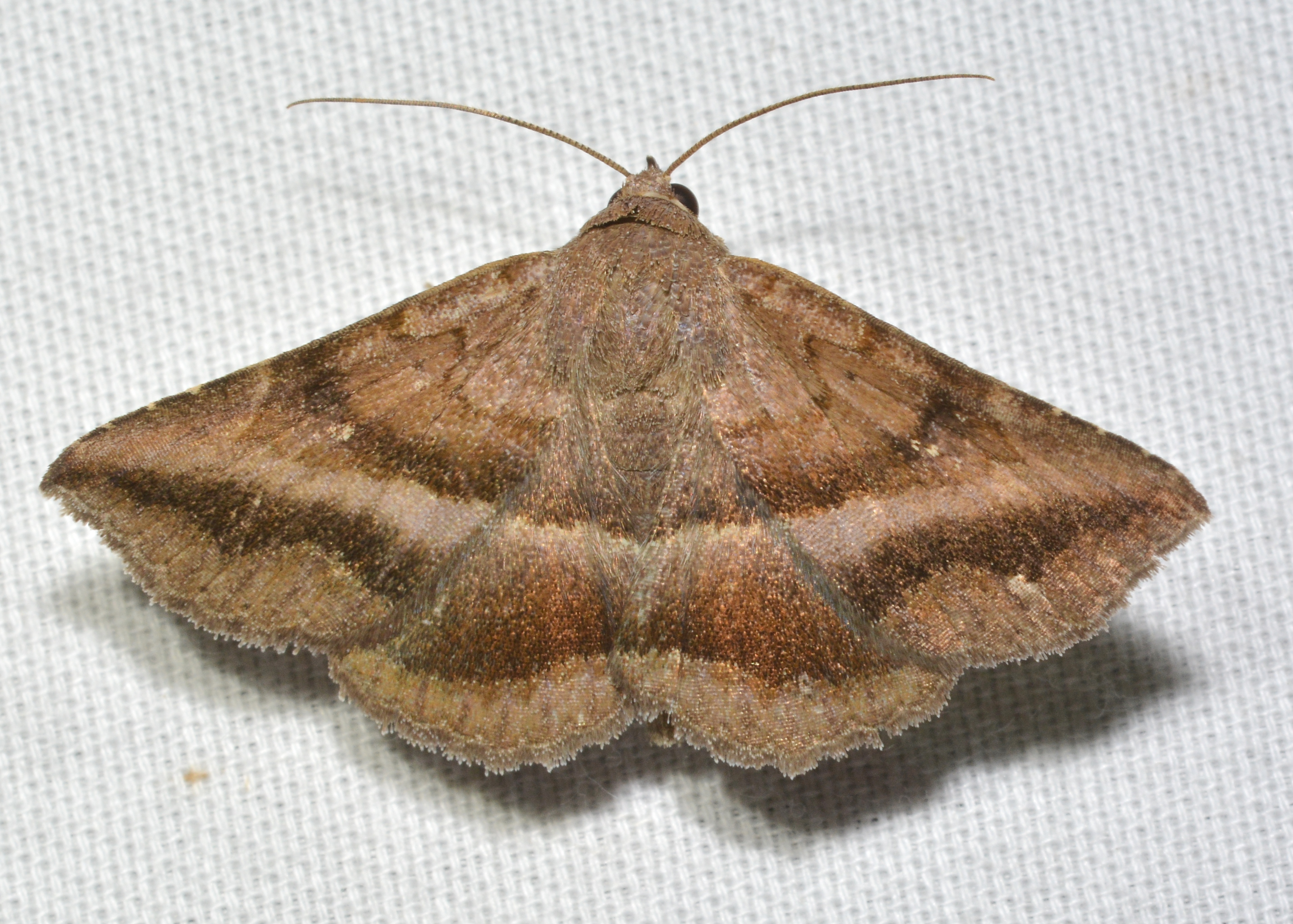
- Lesmone detrahens

Scientific classification
- Kingdom: Animalia
- Phylum: Arthropoda
- Clade: Pancrustacea
- Class: Insecta
- Order: Lepidoptera
- Superfamily: Noctuoidea
- Family: Erebidae
- Tribe: Omopterini
- Genus: Lesmone; Hübner, 1818

Synonyms
- Bendis Hübner, 1823; Azatha Walker, 1858; Trama Harvey, 1875; Lepidotrama Cockerell, 1903

= Lesmone =

Genus of moths

Lesmone is a genus of moths in the family Erebidae. The genus was erected by Jacob Hübner in 1818.

== Species ==
- Lesmone aemylis (Druce, 1890) Panama, Costa Rica
- Lesmone aenaria (Druce, 1890) Costa Rica, Guatemala, Mexico, Texas
- Lesmone bayamona (Schaus, 1940) Puerto Rico
- Lesmone brevimarginata (Schaus, 1912) Guyana
- Lesmone camptogramma (Hampson, 1926) Gyuana
- Lesmone cinerea (Butler, 1878) Jamaica
- Lesmone detrahens (Walker, 1858) Florida, Texas – detracted owlet moth
- Lesmone duplicans (Möschler, 1880) Suriname
- Lesmone ellops (Guenée, 1852) French Guiana
- Lesmone formularis (Geyer, 1837) southern US, Neotropical
- Lesmone fufius (Schaus, 1894) Mexico
- Lesmone gentilis (Schaus, 1894) Mexico
- Lesmone griseipennis (Grote, 1882) Arizona – gray-winged owlet moth
- Lesmone gurda (Guenée, 1852) Saint Thomas
- Lesmone hinna (Geyer, 1837) southern US - Brazil, Antilles
- Lesmone inopia (Felder & Rogenhofer, 1874) French Guiana
- Lesmone iolas (Dognin, 1912) French Guiana
- Lesmone irregularis (Hübner, [1808])
- Lesmone limonia (Guenée, 1852) French Guiana
- Lesmone magdalia (Guenée, 1852) French Guiana
- Lesmone nigrilunata (Schaus, 1914) French Guiana
- Lesmone pannisca (Schaus, 1901) Parana in Brazil
- Lesmone pestilens (Dognin, 1914) Paraguay
- Lesmone planitis (Dyar, 1922) Mexico
- Lesmone porcia (Stoll, 1790) Pernambuco in Brazil
- Lesmone pulchra (Schaus, 1914) Suriname
- Lesmone retardens (Walker, 1858) Honduras
- Lesmone umbrifera (Hampson, 1926) Guyana
