= Lithosiopsis =

Scientific classification
- Kingdom: Animalia
- Phylum: Arthropoda
- Class: Insecta
- Order: Lepidoptera
- Superfamily: Noctuoidea
- Family: Erebidae
- Subfamily: Calpinae
- Genus: Lithosiopsis; Hampson, 1895

Genus of moths

Lithosiopsis is a genus of moths of the family Erebidae.

== Species ==
- Lithosiopsis bicoremata (Holloway, 2005) Borneo
- Lithosiopsis louisiada (Hampson, 1926) New Guinea
- Lithosiopsis papuana (Hampson, 1926) New Guinea, Seram, Sulawesi, Borneo
- Lithosiopsis rectigramma (Hampson, 1907) India, Sri Lanka, Borneo
- Lithosiopsis torsivena Hampson, 1895 Bhutan
