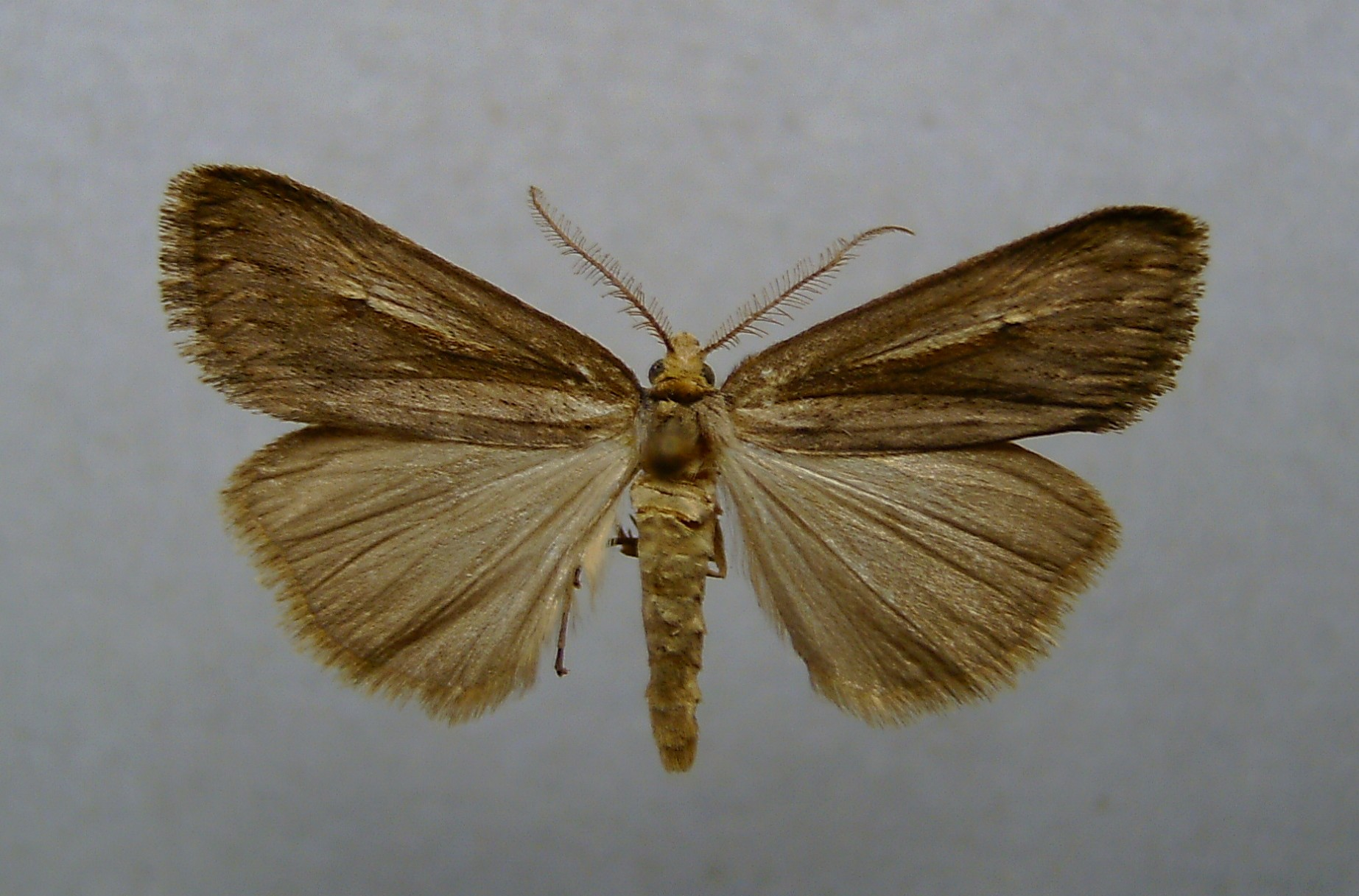
- Stilbina olympica

Scientific classification
- Domain: Eukaryota
- Kingdom: Animalia
- Phylum: Arthropoda
- Class: Insecta
- Order: Lepidoptera
- Superfamily: Noctuoidea
- Family: Noctuidae
- Subfamily: Hadeninae
- Genus: Stilbina; Staudinger, 1892

Synonyms
- Lukaschia Beck, 1991

= Stilbina =

Genus of moths

Stilbina is a genus of moths of the family Noctuidae.

== Species ==
- Stilbina hypaenides Staudinger, 1892
- Stilbina koreana Draudt, 1934
- Stilbina numida (Oberthür, 1890)
- Stilbina olympica Dierl & Povolny 1970
