= Lophocryptis =

Scientific classification
- Kingdom: Animalia
- Phylum: Arthropoda
- Class: Insecta
- Order: Lepidoptera
- Superfamily: Noctuoidea
- Family: Noctuidae
- Subfamily: Acontiinae
- Genus: Lophocryptis; Hampson, 1914

Genus of moths

Lophocryptis is a genus of moths of the family Noctuidae. The genus was erected by George Hampson in 1914.

== Species ==
- Lophocryptis argyrophora Hampson, 1914 Sierra Leone, Ghana, Nigeria, Cameroon
- Lophocryptis sulphurea Hacker, Fiebig & Stadie, 2019 Uganda
