= Lophocoleus =

Scientific classification
- Domain: Eukaryota
- Kingdom: Animalia
- Phylum: Arthropoda
- Class: Insecta
- Order: Lepidoptera
- Superfamily: Noctuoidea
- Family: Erebidae
- Subfamily: Herminiinae
- Genus: Lophocoleus; Butler, 1886

Genus of moths

Lophocoleus is a genus of moths of the family Erebidae. The genus was erected by Arthur Gardiner Butler in 1886. All of the species in this genus are found on Fiji.

== Species ==
- Lophocoleus acuta Robinson, 1975
- Lophocoleus alpipuncta Robinson, 1975
- Lophocoleus iridescens Robinson, 1975
- Lophocoleus mirabilis Butler, 1886
- Lophocoleus rubrescens Robinson, 1975
- Lophocoleus suffusa Robinson, 1975
