= Lophiophora =

Scientific classification
- Kingdom: Animalia
- Phylum: Arthropoda
- Class: Insecta
- Order: Lepidoptera
- Superfamily: Noctuoidea
- Family: Erebidae
- Subfamily: Calpinae
- Genus: Lophiophora; Bryk, 1915

Synonyms
- Pyroblemma Hampson, 1926

Genus of moths

Lophiophora is a genus of moths of the family Erebidae. The genus was erected by Felix Bryk in 1915.

== Species ==
- Lophiophora fulminans Bryk, 1915
- Lophiophora latefasciata Gaede, 1940
- Lophiophora purpurata (Hampson, 1926)
