= Ligidia =

Scientific classification
- Kingdom: Animalia
- Phylum: Arthropoda
- Class: Insecta
- Order: Lepidoptera
- Superfamily: Noctuoidea
- Family: Noctuidae
- Subfamily: Acontiinae
- Genus: Ligidia; Walker, 1862
- Species: L. decisissima

Binomial name
- Ligidia decisissima Walker, 1862

Genus of moths

Ligidia is a monotypic moth genus of the family Noctuidae. Its only species, Ligidia decisissima, is found in Borneo. Both the genus and species were first described by Francis Walker in 1862.
