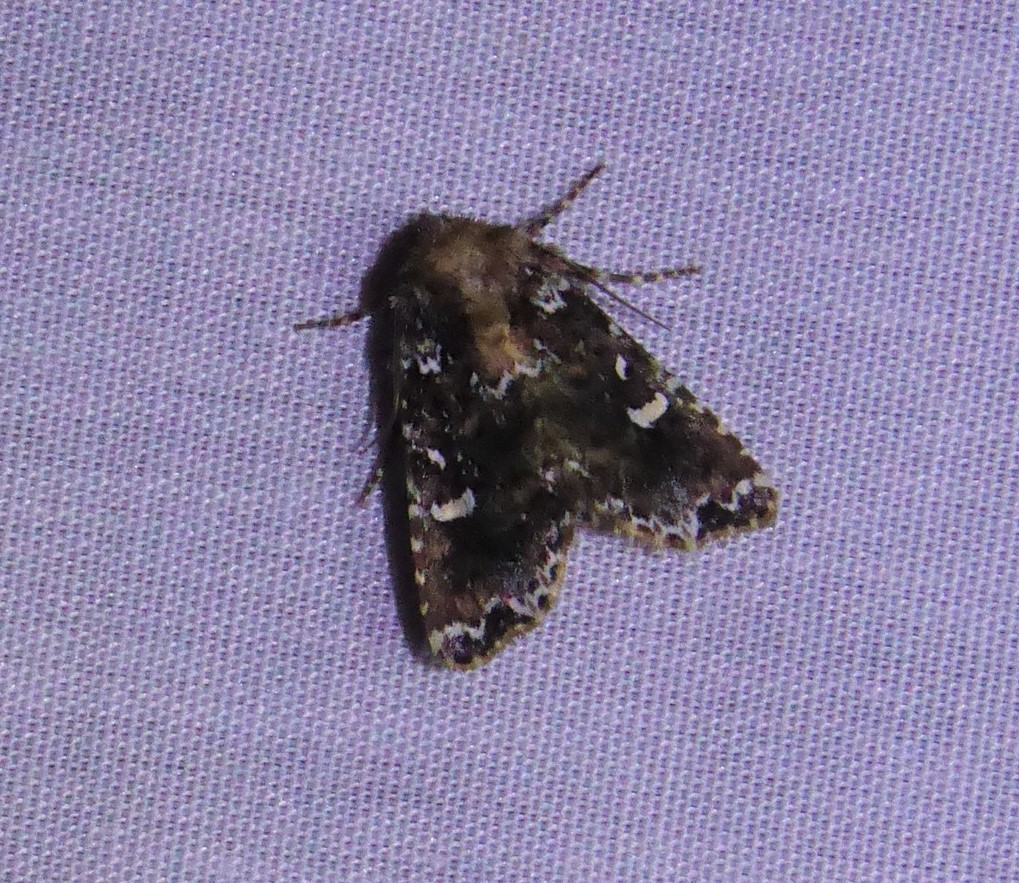
- Leucosigma separata

Scientific classification
- Domain: Eukaryota
- Kingdom: Animalia
- Phylum: Arthropoda
- Class: Insecta
- Order: Lepidoptera
- Superfamily: Noctuoidea
- Family: Noctuidae
- Genus: Leucosigma; H. Druce, 1908

Synonyms
- Chytonidia Schaus, 1914

= Leucosigma =

Genus of moths

Leucosigma is a genus of moths of the family Noctuidae. The genus was erected by Herbert Druce in 1908.

== Species ==
- Leucosigma albimixta (Schaus, 1911) Costa Rica
- Leucosigma chloe (Schaus, 1914) French Guiana, Costa Rica
- Leucosigma poolei Goldstein, 2018 Costa Rica
- Leucosigma reletiva Dyar, 1914 Panama, Costa Rica
- Leucosigma schausi Goldstein, 2018 Costa Rica, Guatemala, Panama, Mexico, Cuba
- Leucosigma separata Zerny, 1916
- Leucosigma solisae Goldstein, 2018 Costa Rica, Peru
- Leucosigma uncifera H. Druce, 1908 Peru, Costa Rica
- Leucosigma viridipicta (Dognin, 1910) French Guiana, Peru
