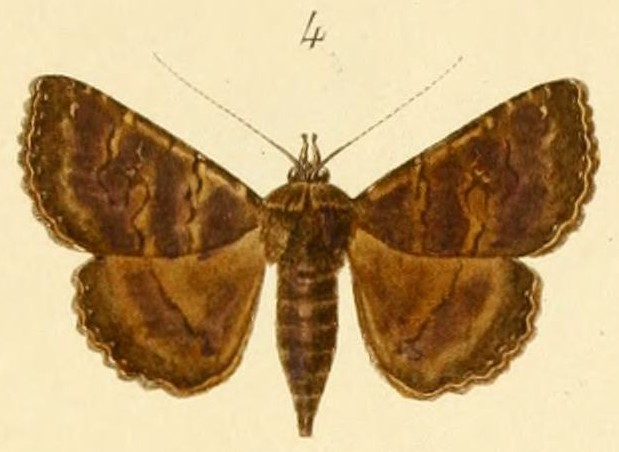

Scientific classification
- Kingdom: Animalia
- Phylum: Arthropoda
- Class: Insecta
- Order: Lepidoptera
- Superfamily: Noctuoidea
- Family: Erebidae
- Subfamily: Calpinae
- Genus: Lophotavia; Hampson, 1926

Synonyms
- Lephotavia Berio, 1938

= Lophotavia =

Genus of moths

Lophotavia is a genus of moths of the family Erebidae. The genus was erected by George Hampson in 1926.

== Species ==
- Lophotavia globulipes (Walker, 1865)
- Lophotavia incivilis (Walker, 1865)
- Lophotavia pulcherrima (Holland, 1894)
