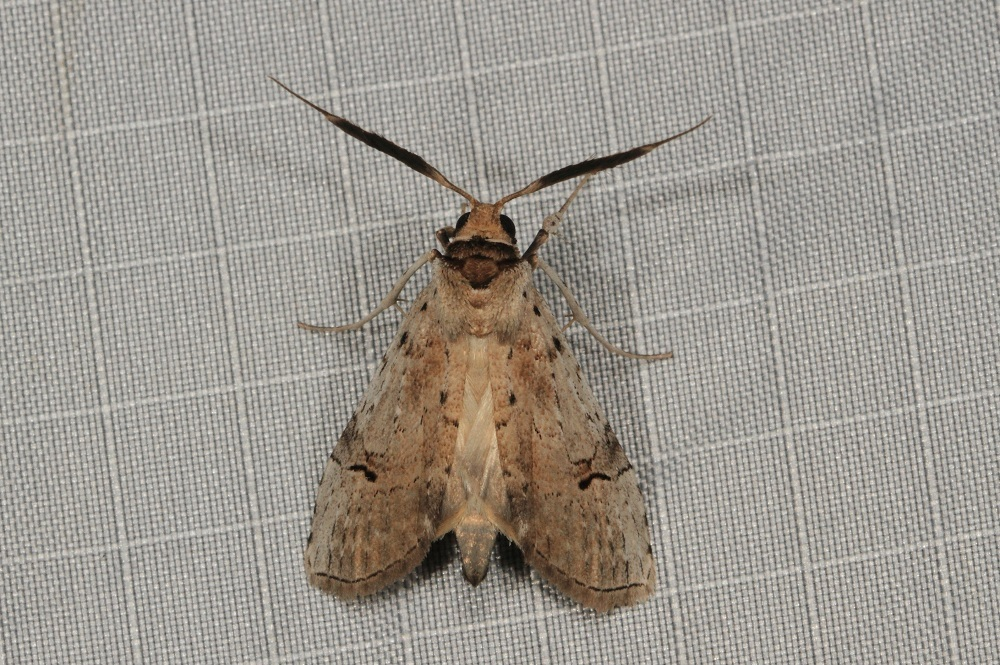
- Lasioceros aroa

Scientific classification
- Kingdom: Animalia
- Phylum: Arthropoda
- Clade: Pancrustacea
- Class: Insecta
- Order: Lepidoptera
- Superfamily: Noctuoidea
- Family: Scranciidae
- Genus: Lasioceros; Bethune-Baker, 1904

Synonyms
- Litoscelis Turner, 1944

= Lasioceros =

Genus of moths

Lasioceros is a genus of moths in the family Erebidae. The genus was erected by George Thomas Bethune-Baker in 1904.

== Species ==
- Lasioceros aroa Bethune-Baker, 1904
- Lasioceros dentilinea Joicey & Talbot, 1918
