= Leucanimorpha =

Scientific classification
- Kingdom: Animalia
- Phylum: Arthropoda
- Class: Insecta
- Order: Lepidoptera
- Superfamily: Noctuoidea
- Family: Erebidae
- Subfamily: Hypeninae
- Genus: Leucanimorpha; Walker, 1870
- Species: L. disjuncta

Binomial name
- Leucanimorpha disjuncta Walker, 1870

Genus of moths

Leucanimorpha is a monotypic moth genus of the family Erebidae. Its only species, Leucanimorpha disjuncta, is found in Somalia. Both the genus and the species were first described by Francis Walker in 1870.
