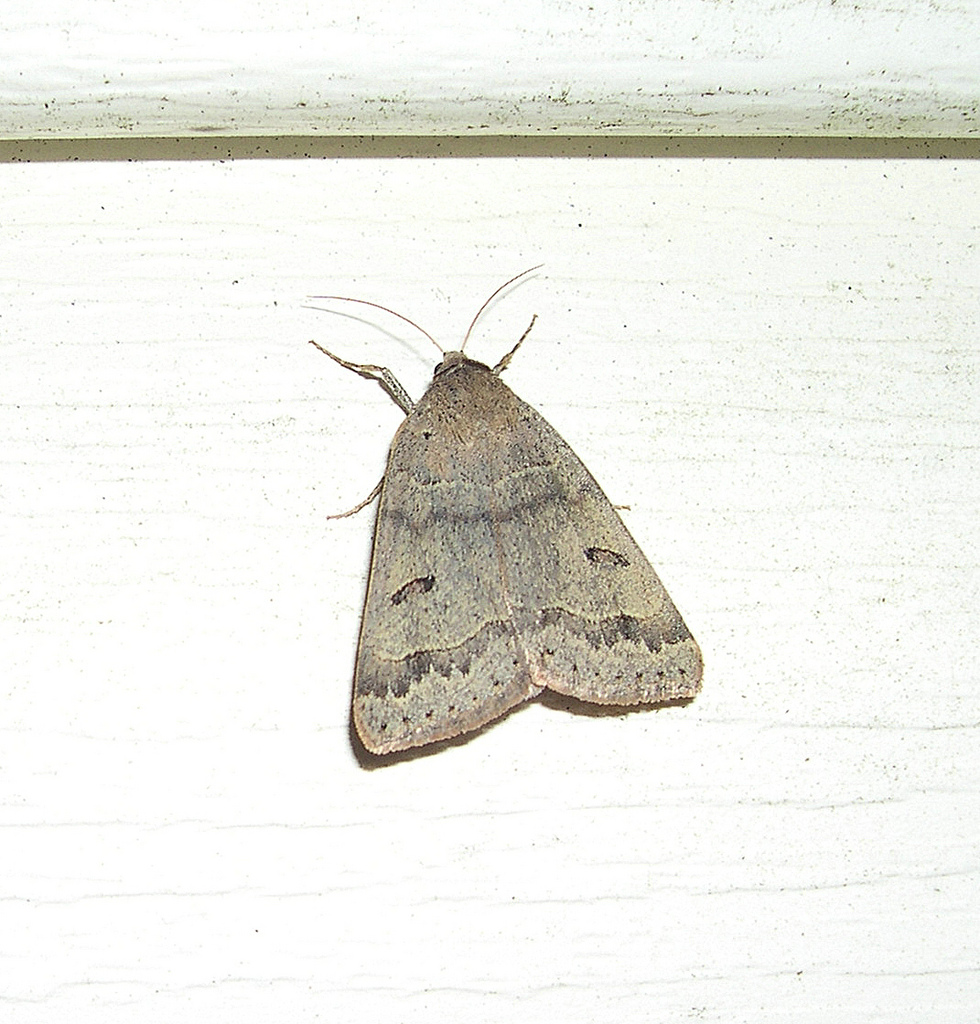
- Phoberia atomaris

Scientific classification
- Kingdom: Animalia
- Phylum: Arthropoda
- Clade: Pancrustacea
- Class: Insecta
- Order: Lepidoptera
- Superfamily: Noctuoidea
- Family: Erebidae
- Tribe: Melipotini
- Genus: Phoberia; Hübner, 1818

Synonyms
- Lyssia Guenée, 1852

= Phoberia =

Genus of moths

Phoberia is a genus of moths in the family Erebidae erected by Jacob Hübner in 1818.

== Species ==
- Phoberia atomaris Hübner, 1818 – common oak moth
- Phoberia ingenua (Walker, 1858)
