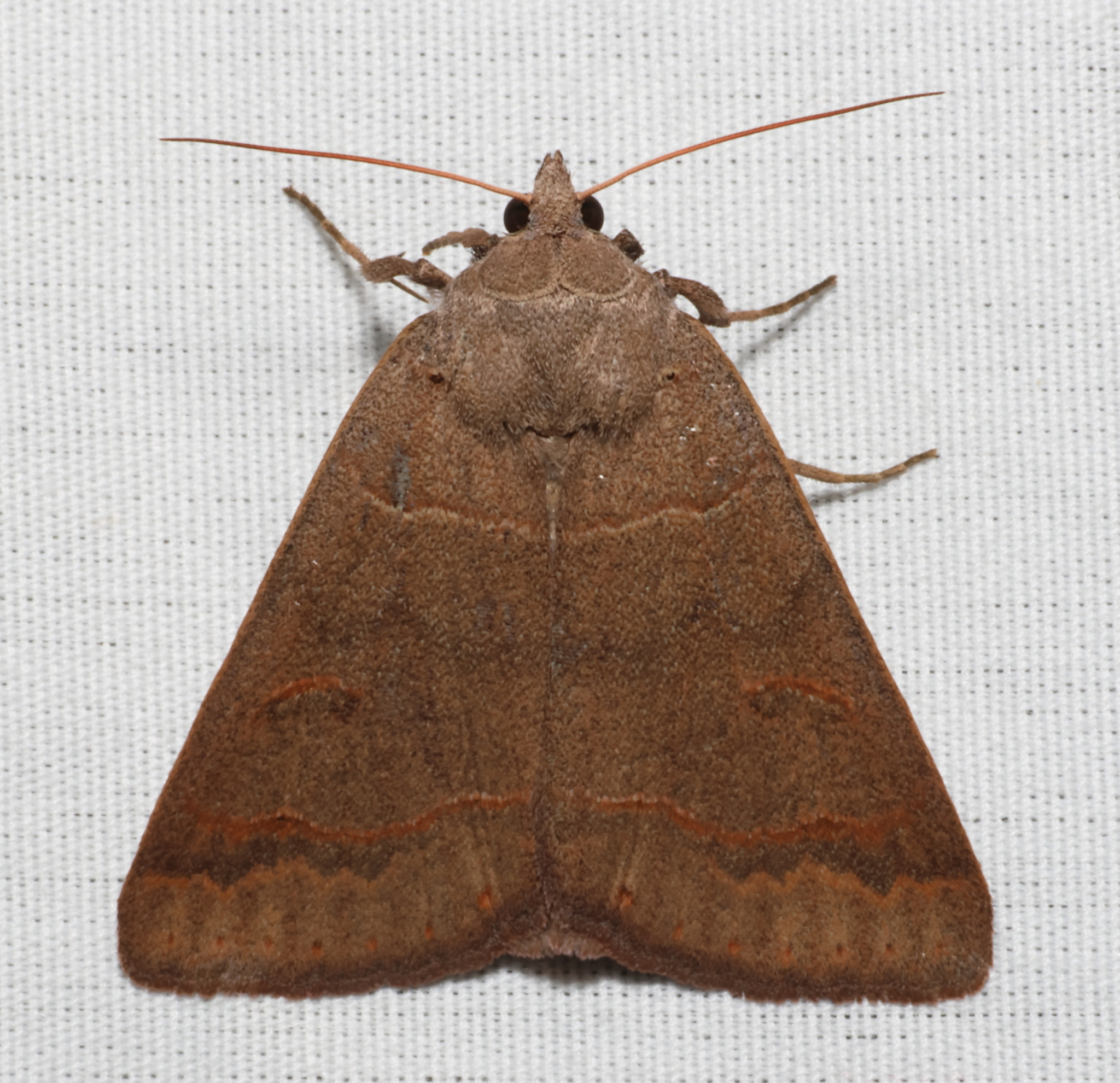

Scientific classification
- Kingdom: Animalia
- Phylum: Arthropoda
- Clade: Pancrustacea
- Class: Insecta
- Order: Lepidoptera
- Superfamily: Noctuoidea
- Family: Erebidae
- Genus: Phoberia
- Species: P. atomaris

Binomial name
- Phoberia atomaris Hübner, 1818

Synonyms
- Phoberia orthosiodes; Phoberia ingenua; Phoberia porrigens

= Phoberia atomaris =

Species of moth

Phoberia atomaris, the common oak moth, is a species of moth in the family Erebidae. The species is found in North America, from Quebec and Ontario south to Florida, and west to Kansas and Texas.

The wingspan is about 38 mm. Adults are on wing from March to July depending on the location.

The larvae feed on Oak species, including Northern red oak. The species is univoltine, with most defoliation occurring during the spring.
