= Margiza =

Scientific classification
- Domain: Eukaryota
- Kingdom: Animalia
- Phylum: Arthropoda
- Class: Insecta
- Order: Lepidoptera
- Superfamily: Noctuoidea
- Family: Erebidae
- Subfamily: Herminiinae
- Genus: Margiza; Dognin, 1914
- Species: M. purpuraria

Binomial name
- Margiza purpuraria Dognin, 1914

Synonyms
- Lophuda Hampson, 1926

Genus of moths

Margiza is a monotypic moth genus of the family Erebidae. Its only species, Margiza purpuraria, is found in Colombia. Both the genus and the species were first described by Paul Dognin in 1914.
