= Lobotorna =

Scientific classification
- Kingdom: Animalia
- Phylum: Arthropoda
- Class: Insecta
- Order: Lepidoptera
- Superfamily: Noctuoidea
- Family: Erebidae
- Subfamily: Herminiinae
- Genus: Lobotorna; Hampson, 1924
- Species: L. albapex

Binomial name
- Lobotorna albapex Hampson, 1924

Genus of moths

Lobotorna is a monotypic moth genus of the family Erebidae. Its only species, Lobotorna albapex, is found in Panama. Both the genus and species were first described by George Hampson in 1924.
