= Lophodelta =

Scientific classification
- Kingdom: Animalia
- Phylum: Arthropoda
- Class: Insecta
- Order: Lepidoptera
- Superfamily: Noctuoidea
- Family: Erebidae
- Subfamily: Herminiinae
- Genus: Lophodelta; Hampson, 1924

Genus of moths

Lophodelta is a genus of moths of the family Erebidae. The genus was erected by George Hampson in 1924.

== Species ==
- Lophodelta argyrolepia Hampson, 1924 Peru
- Lophodelta dinemata Hampson, 1924 Trinidad
- Lophodelta goniograpta Hampson, 1924 Guatemala
- Lophodelta minima Hampson, 1924 Panama
- Lophodelta peratostriga Hampson, 1924 Brazil (Rio de Janeiro)
