= Longalatedes =

Scientific classification
- Domain: Eukaryota
- Kingdom: Animalia
- Phylum: Arthropoda
- Class: Insecta
- Order: Lepidoptera
- Superfamily: Noctuoidea
- Family: Noctuidae
- Subfamily: Xyleninae
- Genus: Longalatedes; Beck, 1991

Genus of moths

Longalatedes is a genus of moths of the family Noctuidae.

== Species ==
- Longalatedes elymi (Treitschke, 1825)
