= Leptotroga =

Scientific classification
- Kingdom: Animalia
- Phylum: Arthropoda
- Class: Insecta
- Order: Lepidoptera
- Superfamily: Noctuoidea
- Family: Erebidae
- Subfamily: Calpinae
- Genus: Leptotroga; Hampson, 1926

Genus of moths

Leptotroga is a genus of moths of the family Erebidae. The genus was erected by George Hampson in 1926.

Lepidoptera and Some Other Life Forms now gives this name as a synonym of Papuacola Hampson, 1926.

== Species ==
- Leptotroga costalis (Moore, 1883) Samoa, Andamans
- Leptotroga gemina (Fabricius, 1794) New Guinea, Sri Lanka
