= Leucotela =

Scientific classification
- Kingdom: Animalia
- Phylum: Arthropoda
- Class: Insecta
- Order: Lepidoptera
- Superfamily: Noctuoidea
- Family: Erebidae
- Subfamily: Calpinae
- Genus: Leucotela; Hampson, 1926

Genus of moths

Leucotela is a genus of moths of the family Erebidae. The genus was erected by George Hampson in 1926.

== Species ==
- Leucotela nigripalpis (Walker, [1866]) Honduras
- Leucotela venia (Dognin, 1914) Uruguay
