= Leistera =

Scientific classification
- Domain: Eukaryota
- Kingdom: Animalia
- Phylum: Arthropoda
- Class: Insecta
- Order: Lepidoptera
- Superfamily: Noctuoidea
- Family: Erebidae
- Subfamily: Calpinae
- Genus: Leistera; C. Swinhoe, 1909

Genus of moths

Leistera is a genus of moths of the family Erebidae. The genus was erected by Charles Swinhoe in 1909.

== Species ==
- Leistera hampsonia (Bethune-Baker, 1906) New Guinea
- Leistera pulchristrigata (Bethune-Baker, 1906) New Guinea
- Leistera splendens (Bethune-Baker, 1906) New Guinea
