= Leiorhynx =

Scientific classification
- Kingdom: Animalia
- Phylum: Arthropoda
- Class: Insecta
- Order: Lepidoptera
- Superfamily: Noctuoidea
- Family: Erebidae
- Subfamily: Calpinae
- Genus: Leiorhynx; Hampson, 1902

Genus of moths

Leiorhynx is a genus of moths of the family Erebidae. The genus was erected by George Hampson in 1902.

== Species ==
- Leiorhynx argentifascia Hampson, 1902 Botswana, Zimbabwe, Namibia, South Africa
- Leiorhynx atrirena de Joannis, 1913 Eritrea
