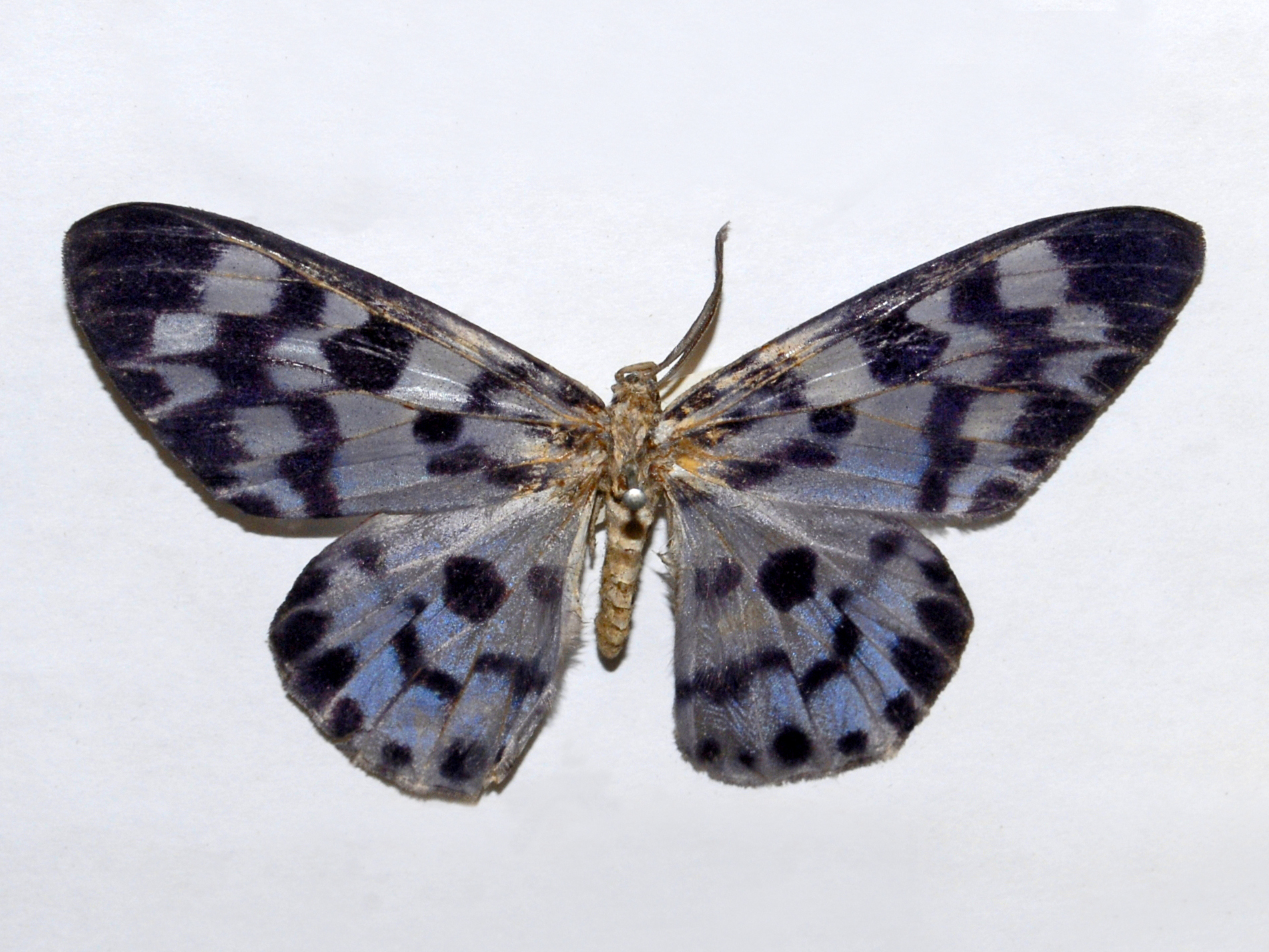
- Longicella mollis

Scientific classification
- Domain: Eukaryota
- Kingdom: Animalia
- Phylum: Arthropoda
- Class: Insecta
- Order: Lepidoptera
- Superfamily: Noctuoidea
- Family: Noctuidae
- Subfamily: Agaristinae
- Genus: Longicella; Jordan in Rothschild & Jordan, 1896

= Longicella =

Genus of moths

Longicella is a genus of moths of the family Noctuidae. The genus was erected by Karl Jordan in 1896.

== Species ==
- Longicella luctifera Boisduval, 1836
- Longicella mollis Walker, 1856
  - Longicella mollis decipiens Butler, 1884
  - Longicella mollis detanii Kishida, 1993
  - Longicella mollis mollis Walker, 1856
