= Laugasa =

Scientific classification
- Kingdom: Animalia
- Phylum: Arthropoda
- Class: Insecta
- Order: Lepidoptera
- Superfamily: Noctuoidea
- Family: Erebidae
- Subfamily: Calpinae
- Genus: Laugasa; Walker, 1859
- Species: L. perillalis

Binomial name
- Laugasa perillalis Walker, 1859

Genus of moths

Laugasa is a genus of moths of the family Erebidae. Its only species, Laugasa perillalis, is found in Rio de Janeiro, Brazil. Both the genus and species were first described by Francis Walker in 1859.
