= Lutogonia =

Scientific classification
- Domain: Eukaryota
- Kingdom: Animalia
- Phylum: Arthropoda
- Class: Insecta
- Order: Lepidoptera
- Superfamily: Noctuoidea
- Family: Erebidae
- Subfamily: Calpinae
- Genus: Lutogonia; Schaus, 1913
- Species: L. simplex

Binomial name
- Lutogonia simplex Schaus, 1913

Genus of moths

Lutogonia is a monotypic moth genus of the family Erebidae. Its only species, Lutogonia simplex, is found in Costa Rica. Both the genus and the species were first described by William Schaus in 1913.
