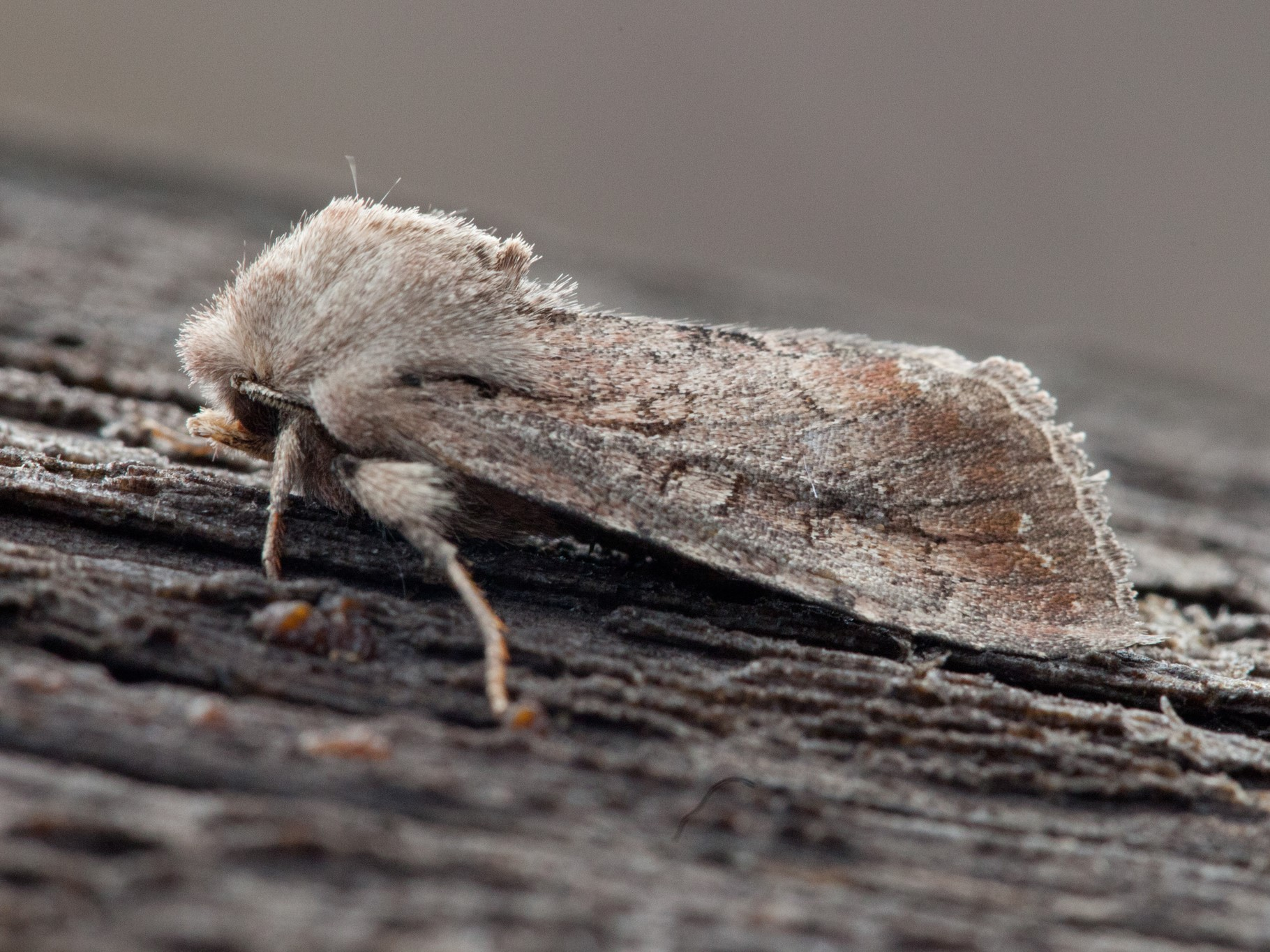
- Lasianobia lauta

Scientific classification
- Kingdom: Animalia
- Phylum: Arthropoda
- Class: Insecta
- Order: Lepidoptera
- Superfamily: Noctuoidea
- Family: Noctuidae
- Genus: Lasianobia; Hampson, 1905

= Lasianobia =

Genus of moths

Lasianobia is a genus of moths in the family Noctuidae.

== Species ==
- Lasianobia albilinea (Draudt, 1950)
- Lasianobia boursini Hacker, 1996
- Lasianobia dasypolioides (Boursin, 1964)
- Lasianobia decreta (Püngeler, 1900)
- Lasianobia dierli Ronkay & Ronkay, 2020
- Lasianobia dvoraki Saldaitis, Volynkin & Truuverk, 2018
- Lasianobia ferrobscura Hreblay & Ronkay, 1998
- Lasianobia fickleri Gyulai, Ronkay & Saldaitis, 2011
- Lasianobia illauta Ronkay & Gyulai, 2006
- Lasianobia odiosa (Staudinger, 1895)
- Lasianobia labranga Saldaitis, Volynkin & Truuverk, 2018
- Lasianobia lauta (Püngeler, 1900)
- Lasianobia levicula Püngeler, 1900
- Lasianobia pensottii Saldaitis, Floriani, Ivinskis & Babics, 2013
- Lasianobia qinghana Saldaitis, Volynkin & Truuverk, 2018
- Lasianobia superba (Alphéraky, 1892)
