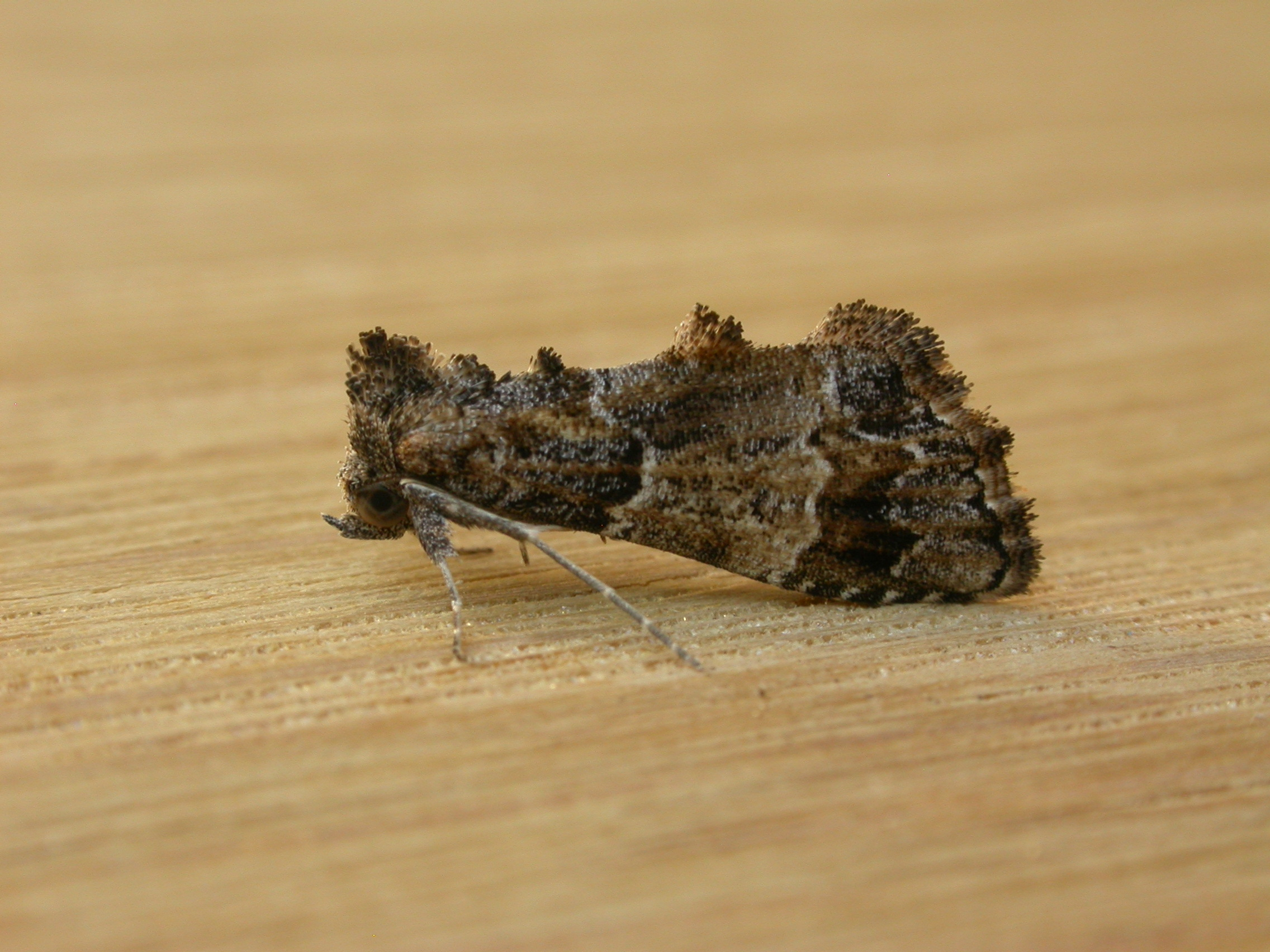
- Arrade destituta

Scientific classification
- Kingdom: Animalia
- Phylum: Arthropoda
- Class: Insecta
- Order: Lepidoptera
- Superfamily: Noctuoidea
- Family: Erebidae
- Subfamily: Hypeninae
- Genus: Arrade; Walker, 1863

Synonyms
- Madoce Walker, 1863; Larassa Walker, [1866]; Ziza Walker, 1863; Lophocraspedon Hampson, 1893

= Arrade =

Genus of moths

Arrade is a genus of moths of the family Erebidae described by Francis Walker in 1863.

== Description ==
Palpi obliquely porrect (extending forward), of moderate length. Second joint hairy. Frontal tuft sharp. Antennae minutely ciliated in male. Thorax and abdomen smoothly scaled. Abdomen long. Legs naked. Forewings long and narrow with acute apex. The outer margin nearly straight. A large tuft of scales found on inner margin beyond middle. Veins 6 and 7 arise from angle of cell. Veins 8 to 10 stalked from before the end or sometimes vein 10 absent. Hindwings with veins 3 and 4 stalked or from cell, whereas veins 6 and 7 stalked and vein 5 from middle of discocellulars.

== Species ==
- Arrade aroa (Bethune-Baker, 1908) New Guinea
- Arrade cristatum (Hampson, 1893) Sri Lanka
- Arrade destituta (Walker, 1865) Queensland
- Arrade erebusalis Walker, 1863 Sri Lanka, Nicobar Islands, Singapore, Borneo, New Guinea, Bismarck Archipelago, Queensland
- Arrade juba Schaus, 1913 Costa Rica
- Arrade leucocosmalis (Walker, 1863) Queensland
- Arrade lineatula (Walker, 1863) Borneo
- Arrade linecites Schaus, 1916 Cuba
- Arrade monaeses Schaus, 1913 Costa Rica
- Arrade ostentalis (Walker, 1863) Borneo, Peninsular Malaysia, India, Philippines
- Arrade parva Bethune-Baker, 1894 Egypt
- Arrade percnopis Turner, 1908 Queensland
- Arrade rudisella (Walker, 1863) Borneo, Sumatra, Sulawesi
- Arrade samoensis Tams, 1935 Solomon Islands, Samoa
- Arrade stenoptera (Bethune-Baker, 1911) Angola
- Arrade vitellinalis (Walker, [1866]) Java
