= List of Noctuinae genera =

Approximately 600 genera belong to the subfamily Noctuinae, cutworm or dart moths. There are more than 7,000 described species in this subfamily of Noctuidae.

== Noctuinae genera ==
Tribe Actinotiini Beck, 1996
Actinotia Hübner, 1821
Alastria Lafontaine & Troubridge, 2004
Chloantha Boisduval, Rambur & Graslin, 1836
Iodopepla Franclemont, 1964
Nedra Clarke, 1940
Tribe Apameini Guenée, 1841
Achatodes Guenée, 1852
Acrapex Hampson, 1894
Afrogortyna Krüger, 1997
Amphipoea Billberg, 1820
Anapamea Sugi, 1982
Antapamea Sugi, 1982
Apamea Ochsenheimer, 1816
Archanara Walker, 1866
Arenostola Hampson, 1908
Argyrospila Herrich-Schaffer, 1851
Asidemia Sugi, 1982
Atrachea Warren, 1911
Benjaminiola Strand, 1928
Buakea Moyal et al., 2011
Calamia Hübner, 1821
Cervyna Ronkay, Zilli & Fibiger, 2005
Cherokeea Quinter & Sullivan, 2014
Cobalos Smith, 1899
Coenagria Staudinger, 1892
Coenobia Stephens, 1850
Crypsedra Warren, 1910
Ctenostola Sugi, 1982
Denticucullus Rakosy, 1996
Eremobia Stephens, 1829
Eremobina McDunnough, 1937
Euros H. Edwards, 1881
Fabula Fibiger, Zilli & Ronkay, 2005
Franclemontia Ferguson, 1992
Globia Fibiger, Zilli, Ronkay & Goldstein, 2010
Gortyna Ochsenheimer, 1816
Hampsonicola Ronkay, Zilli & Fibiger, 2010
Helotropha Lederer, 1857
Hydraecia Guenée, 1841
Hydredes Volynkin & Matov, 2014
Hypocoena Hampson, 1908
Lateroligia Zilli, Fibiger & Ronkay, 2005
Lemmeria Barnes & Benjamin, 1926
Lenisa Fibiger, Zilli & Ronkay, 2005
Litoligia Beck, 1999
Lophocalama Hampson, 1910
Loscopia Beck, 1991
Luperina Boisduval, 1829
Macronoctua Grote, 1874
Melanapamea Lafontaine, 2009
Meropleon Dyar, 1924
Mesapamea Heinicke, 1959
Mesoligia Boursin, 1965
Minigrapta Matov & Kononenko, 2012
Neoligia Troubridge & Lafontaine, 2002
Nonagria Ochsenheimer, 1816
Oligia Hübner, 1821
Oria Hübner, 1821
Orthomoia Mustelin, 2000
Oxytripia Staudinger, 1871
Papaipema Smith, 1899
Parapamea Bird, 1927
Peraniana Strand, 1942
Photedes Lederer, 1857
Phragmatiphila Hampson, 1908
Protapamea Quinter, 2009
Protarchanara Beck, 1999
Pseudluperina Beck, 1999
Resapamea Varga & Ronkay, 1992
Rhizedra Warren, 1911
Rotoa Strand, 1942
Sedina Urbahn, 1933
Sesamia Guenée, 1852
Staurophora Reichenbach, 1817
Unchelea Fibiger, Zilli & Ronkay, 2010
Virgo Staudinger, 1892
Xenapamea Sugi, 1970
Xylomoia Staudinger, 1892
Tribe Arzamini Grote, 1883
Bellura Walker, 1865
Tribe Caradrinini Boisduval, 1840
Subtribe Athetiina Fibiger & Lafontaine, 2005

Anorthodes Smith, 1891
Athetis Hübner, 1821
Proxenus Herrich-Schäffer, 1850

Subtribe Caradrinina Boisduval, 1840

Caradrina Ochsenheimer, 1816
Charanyca Billberg, 1820
Chilodes Herrich-Schäffer, 1849
Hoplodrina Boursin, 1937
Protoperigea McDunnough, 1937
Rusina Stephens, 1829
Stenodrina Boursin, 1937

Not assigned to a subtribe

Atypha Hübner, 1821
Diadochia Püngeler, 1914
Stygiodrina Boursin, 1937

Tribe Dypterygiini Forbes, 1954
Acroria Walker, 1858
Anthracia Hübner, 1823
Callyna Guenée, 1852
Colocasidia Sugi, 1982
Dypterygia Stephens, 1829
Eremotrachea Hacker, 2001
Feliniopsis Roepke, 1938
Heterophysa Boursin, 1953
Leucotrachea Janse, 1937
Leumicamia Viette, 1965
Magusa Walker, 1857
Mimleucania Hampson, 1909
Mormo Ochsenheimer, 1816
Neophaenis Hampson, 1908
Olivenebula Kishida & Yoshimoto, 1977
Polyphaenis Boisduval, 1840
Sasunaga Moore, 1881
Stenopterygia Hampson, 1908
Thalpophila Hübner, 1820
Trachea Ochsenheimer, 1816
Triphaenopsis Butler, 1878
Tribe Elaphriini Beck, 1996
Bryolymnia Hampson, 1908
Chytonix Grote, 1874
Elaphria Hübner, 1818
Galgula Guenée, 1852
Gonodes Druce, 1908
Hampsonodes Nye, 1975
Pseudomarimatha Ferris & Lafontaine, 2010
Strotihypera Kononenko & Han, 2011
Tribe Episemini
Cleoceris Boisduval, 1836
Leucochlaena Hampson, 1906
Tribe Eriopygini Fibiger & Lafontaine, 2005
Anhimella McDunnough, 1943
Anhypotrix Lafontaine, Ferris & Walsh, 2010
Engelhardtia Barnes & Benjamin, 1923
Eriopyga Guenée, 1852
Eriopygodes Hampson, 1905
Fergusonix Mustelin & Leuschner, 2000
Hexorthodes McDunnough, 1943
Homorthodes McDunnough, 1943
Hydroeciodes Hampson, 1905
Hyperepia Barnes & Lindsey, 1922
Hypotrix Guenée, 1852
Hyssia Guenée, 1852
Lacinipolia McDunnough, 1937
Lasionycta Aurivillius, 1892
Lophoceramica Dyar, 1908
Marilopteryx Franclemont, 1982
Mimobarathra Barnes & McDunnough, 1915
Miodera Smith, 1908
Neleucania Smith, 1902
Nudorthodes Lafontaine, Walsh & Ferris, 2014
Orthodes Guenée, 1852
Protorthodes McDunnough, 1943
Psammopolia L. G. Crabo & Lafontaine, 2009
Pseudorthodes Morrison, 1874
Rhabdorthodes Crabo, 2018
Synorthodes Franclemont, 1976
Trichocerapoda Benjamin, 1932
Trichofeltia McDunnough, 1929
Tricholita Grote, 1875
Trichopolia Grote, 1883
Ulolonche Smith, 1888
Zosteropoda Grote, 1874
Tribe Glottulini Guenée, 1852
Brithys Hübner, 1821
Diaphone Hübner, 1820
Polytela Guenée, 1852
Polytelodes Hampson, 1905
Xanthopastis Hübner, 1821
Tribe Hadenini Guenée, 1837
Afotella Barnes & Benjamin, 1925
Anapoma Berio, 1980
Anarta Ochsenheimer, 1816
Anartomorpha Alphéraky, 1892
Antha Staudinger, 1892
Apospasta Fletcher D.S., 1959
Aspidifrontia Hampson, 1902
Bambusiphila Sugi, 1958
Brithysana Viette, 1963
Calpiformis Hampson, 1908
Campydelta Berio, 1964
Capillamentum Pinhey, 1956
Caradjia Zerny, 1928
Cardepia Hampson, 1905
Catamecia Staudinger, 1898
Catasema Staudinger, 1888
Centrochlora Dyar, 1912
Ceramica Guenée, 1852
Chabuata Walker, 1858
Chandata Moore, 1882
Chlorognesia Warren, 1913
Cirrodes Hampson, 1910
Clavipalpula Staudinger, 1892
Clemathada Beck, 1996
Closteromorpha R.Felder, 1874
Cnodifrontia Hampson, 1902
Conicofrontia Hampson, 1902
Conisania Hampson, 1905
Copifrontia Hampson, 1905
Coranarta Beck, 1991
Cornutifera Varga & Ronkay, 1991
Craterestra Hampson, 1905
Crosia Dupont, 1910
Ctenoceratoda Varga, 1992
Cyclopera Hampson, 1908
Cyptonychia Hampson, 1900
Cytocanis Hampson, 1910
Cytothymia Hampson, 1908
Dargida Walker, 1856
Dicerogastra Fletcher D.S., 1961
Dictyestra Sugi, 1982
Dimorphicosmia Sugi, 1982
Diparopsis Hampson, 1902
Ebertidia Boursin, 1967
Ectolopha Hampson, 1902
Elyptron Saalmüller, 1891
Enterpia Guenée, 1850
Eremochroa Meyrick, 1897
Escaria Grote, 1882
Ethiopica Hampson, 1909
Ethioterpia Hampson, 1910
Eulymnia Hampson, 1908
Euromoia Staudinger, 1892
Eurypsyche Butler, 1886
Euterpiodes Hampson, 1908
Euxenistis Warren, 1910
Feredayia Kirkaldy, 1910
Goenycta Hampson, 1909
Hada Billberg, 1820
Hadena Schrank, 1802
Hadenella Grote, 1883
Haderonia Staudinger, 1895
Haplocestra Aurivillius, 1910
Hecatera Guenée, 1852
Heterochroma Guenée, 1852
Hypocalamia Hampson, 1910
Hypoplexia Hampson, 1908
Interdelta Berio, 1964
Irene Saldaitis & Benedek, 2017
Kisegira Hreblay & Ronkay, 1999
Kollariana Hacker, 1996
Lacanobia Billberg, 1820
Leucapamea Sugi, 1982
Lophotarsia Hampson, 1902
Mamestra Ochsenheimer, 1816
Mammifrontia Barnes & Lindsey, 1922
Megaegira Ronkay, Ronkay, Gyulai & Hacker, 2010
Melanchra Hübner, 1820
Meliana Curtis, 1839
Melionica Berio, 1970
Mervia Daricheva, 1961
Mesoplus Boursin, 1949
Metopiora Meyrick, 1902
Monostola Alphéraky, 1892
Multisigna Varga, Ronkay & Ronkay, 2017
Neopersectania Rodríguez & Angulo, 2007
Neopistria Hampson, 1908
Nereisana Strand, 1911
Niaboma Nye, 1975
Nyodes Laporte, 1971
Odontestra Hampson, 1905
Omphalestra Fletcher D.S., 1961
Orthogonia Felder & Felder, 1862
Pachetra Guenée, 1841
Palponima Hampson, 1905
Papestra Sukhareva, 1973
Paracentropus Boursin, 1958
Paracroria Hampson, 1908
Polia Ochsenheimer, 1816
Protomeceras Rebel, 1901
Pseudamathes Rothschild, 1920
Pseuderastria Hampson, 1908
Pygmeopolia Hreblay & Ronkay, 1998
Rhynchoplexia Hampson, 1908
Rougeotia Laporte, 1974
Saalmuellerana Fletcher & Viette, 1962
Sajania A.G. Vologdin, 1962
Sapporia Sugi, 1982
Saragossa Staudinger, 1900
Sarcopolia Sugi, 1982
Sciomesa Tams & Bowden, 1953
Scotogramma H. Edwards, 1887
Scriptania Hampson, 1905
Selenistis Hampson, 1908
Sidemia Staudinger, 1892
Sideridis Hübner, 1821
Sparkia Nye, 1975
Speia Tams & Bowden, 1953
Spiramater McCabe, 1980
Stauropides Hampson, 1908
Stomafrontia Hampson, 1905
Sugiella Özdikmen, 2008
Syncalama Hampson, 1908
Thargelia Püngeler, 1899
Thyatirodes Hampson, 1909
Thyrestra Hampson, 1905
Trichanarta Hampson, 1896
Trichestra Hampson, 1905
Tricheurois Hampson, 1905
Trichocosmia Grote, 1883
Trichordestra McCabe, 1980
Tridepia McDunnough, 1937
Trudestra McDunnough, 1937
Turanica Boursin, 1963
Tycomarptes Fletcher D.S., 1961
Vietteania Rungs, 1956
Xanthiria Hampson, 1910
Xantholepis Hampson, 1910
Tribe Leucaniini Guenée, 1837
Analetia Calora, 1966
Leucania Ochsenheimer, 1816
Mythimna Ochsenheimer, 1816
Persectania Hampson, 1905
Senta Stephens, 1834
Tiracola Moore, 1881
Tribe Noctuini Latreille, 1809
Subtribe Agrotina Harris, 1841

Actebia Stephens, 1829
Agrotis Ochsenheimer, 1816
Anicla Grote, 1874
Basistriga Fibiger & Lafontaine, 1997
Brachypteragrotis Viette, 1959
Copablepharon Harvey, 1878
Dichagyris Lederer, 1857
Eucoptocnemis Grote, 1874
Euxoa Hübner, 1821
Feltia Walker, 1856
Hemieuxoa McDunnough, 1929
Himachalia Hacker & Peks, 1992
Peridroma Hübner, 1821
Protogygia McDunnough, 1929
Richia Grote, 1887
Striacosta Lafontaine, 2004

Subtribe Axyliina Fibiger & Lafontaine, 2005

Axylia Hübner, 1821

Subtribe Noctuina Latreille, 1809

Abagrotis Smith, 1890
Adelphagrotis Smith, 1890
Agnorisma Lafontaine, 1998
Amazonides Fletcher D.S., 1961
Anaplectoides McDunnough, 1929
Aplectoides Butler, 1878
Cerastis Ochsenheimer, 1816
Chersotis Boisduval, 1840
Choephora Grote & Robinson, 1868
Coenophila Stephens, 1850
Cryptocala Benjamin, 1921
Cyrebia Guenée, 1852
Diarsia Hübner, 1821
Divaena Fibiger, 1993
Epilecta Hübner, 1821
Eueretagrotis Smith, 1890
Eugnorisma Boursin, 1946
Eugraphe Hübner, 1821
Eurois Hübner, 1821
Goniographa Varga & Ronkay, 2002
Graphiphora Ochsenheimer, 1816
Hemipachnobia McDunnough, 1929
Hermonassa Walker, 1865
Isochlora Staudinger, 1882
Lycophotia Hübner, 1821
Naenia Stephens, 1827
Netrocerocora Bartel, 1903
Noctua Linnaeus, 1758
Ochropleura Hübner, 1821
Parabagrotis Lafontaine, 1998
Parabarrovia Gibson, 1920
Paradiarsia McDunnough, 1929
Prognorisma Lafontaine, 1998-01
Pronoctua Smith, 1894
Protolampra McDunnough, 1929
Pseudohermonassa Varga, 1990
Rhyacia Hübner, 1821
Setagrotis Smith, 1890
Spaelotis Boisduval, 1840
Standfussiana Boursin, 1946
Tesagrotis Lafontaine, 1998
Xestia Hübner, 1818

Not assigned to a subtribe

Ammogrotis Staudinger, 1895
Dimorphinoctua Viette, 1952
Epipsilia Hübner, 1821
Euxootera Fletcher, 1961
Hyperfrontia Berio, 1962
Miniphila Beck, 1996
Neoparadigma Krüger, 2006
Psectraxylia Fletcher D.S., 1961
Sclereuxoa Berio, 1977
Xylostola Hampson, 1909

Tribe Orthosiini Guenée, 1837
Acerra Grote, 1874
Achatia Hübner, 1813
Admetovis Grote, 1873
Anorthoa Berio, 1980
Crocigrapha Grote, 1875
Dioszeghyana Hreblay, 1993
Egira Duponchel, 1845
Harutaeographa Yoshimoto, 1993
Lithopolia Yoshimoto, 1993
Morrisonia Grote, 1874
Nepalopolia Ronkay, Ronkay, Gyulai & Hacker, 2010
Orthimella Schmidt & Lafontaine, 2018
Orthosia Ochsenheimer, 1816
Panolis Hübner, 1821
Perigonica Smith, 1890
Perigrapha Lederer, 1857
Protegira Ronkay, Ronkay, Gyulai & Hacker, 2010
Stretchia H. Edwards, 1874
Tribe Phlogophorini Hampson, 1918
Checupa Moore, 1867
Conservula Grote, 1874
Euplexia Stephens, 1829
Euplexidia Hampson, 1896
Oroplexia Hampson, 1908
Paradiopa Prout, 1928
Pareuplexia Warren, 1911
Phlogophora Treitschke, 1825
Pseudenargia Boursin, 1956
Yula Bethune-Baker, 1906
Tribe Phosphilini Poole, 1995
Acherdoa Walker, 1865
Phosphila Hübner, 1818
Phuphena Walker, 1858
Speocropia Hampson, 1908
Tribe Prodeniini Forbes, 1954
Spodoptera Guenée, 1852
Tribe Pseudeustrotiini Beck, 1996
Anterastria Sugi, 1982
Pseudeustrotia Warren, 1913
Tribe Tholerini Beck, 1996
Cerapteryx Curtis, 1833
Nephelodes Guenée, 1852
Tholera Hübner, 1821
Tribe Xylenini Guenée, 1837
Subtribe Antitypina Forbes & Franclemont, 1954

Ammoconia Lederer, 1857
Andropolia Grote, 1895
Antitype Hübner, 1821
Aporophyla Guenée, 1841
Blepharita Hampson, 1907
Dasypolia Guenée, 1852
Dichonia Hübner, 1821
Dryobota Lederer, 1857
Dryobotodes Warren, 1911
Dryotype Hampson, 1906
Eumichtis Hübner, 1821
Mniotype Franclemont, 1941
Platypolia Grote, 1895
Polymixis Hübner, 1820
Pseudohadena Alpheraky, 1889
Rhizagrotis Smith, 1890
Scotochrosta Lederer, 1857
Sutyna Todd, 1958
Trigonophora Hübner, 1821
Xylotype Hampson, 1906

Subtribe Cosmiina Guenée, 1852

Atethmia Hübner, 1821
Chasminodes Hampson, 1910
Cosmia Ochsenheimer, 1816
Dicycla Guenée, 1852
Enargia Hübner, 1821
Ipimorpha Hübner, 1821
Xanthocosmia Sugi, 1982
Zotheca Grote, 1874

Subtribe Ufeina Crumb, 1956

Ufeus Grote, 1873

Subtribe Xylenina Guenée, 1837

Agrochola Hubner, 1821
Agrocholorta
Anathix Franclemont, 1937
Aseptis McDunnough, 1937
Brachylomia Hampson, 1906
Chaetaglaea Franclemont, 1943
Conistra Hübner, 1821
Epidemas Smith, 1894
Epiglaea Grote, 1878
Eucirroedia Grote, 1875
Eupsilia Hübner, 1821
Hillia Grote, 1883
Homoglaea Morrison, 1876
Hyppa Duponchel, 1845
Incertobole
Jodia Hübner, 1818
Lithophane Hübner, 1821
Metaxaglaea Franclemont, 1937
Orbona Hübner, 1821
Paraseptis Mustelin & Crabo, 2015
Psectraglaea Hampson, 1906
Pyreferra Franclemont, 1937
Sericaglaea Franclemont, 1941
Suginistra
Sunira Franclemont, 1950
Sydiva Moore, 1882
Telorta Warren, 1910
Tiliacea Tutt, 1896
Viridiseptis Mustelin & Crabo, 2015
Vulpechola
Xanthia Ochsenheimer, 1816
Xylena Ochsenheimer, 1816
Xystopeplus Franclemont, 1937

Not assigned to a subtribe

Agrotisia Hampson, 1908
Ammopolia Boursin, 1955
Antivaleria Sugi, 1980
Apterogenum Berio, 2002
Borbotana Walker, 1858
Busseola Thurau, 1904
Carelis Bowden, 1956
Csorbatype Hreblay, Peregovits & Ronkay, 1999
Etlorta Kononenko, 2016
Fagitana Walker, 1865
Feraxinia Moyal et al., 2010
Fishia Grote, 1877
Gyrospilara Kononenko, 1989
Hemibryomima Barnes & Benjamin, 1927
Hemiglaea Sugi, 1980
Homoanarta Barnes & Benjamin, 1923
Karana Moore, 1882
Litholomia Grote, 1875
Lithomoia Hübner, 1821
Meristides Strand, 1909
Mesogona Boisduval, 1840
Metappana Viette, 1965
Neostichtis Janse, 1937
Niphonyx Sugi, 1982
Orohadena Ronkay, Varga & Gyulai, 2002
Pachypolia Grote, 1874
Palaeagrotis Hampson, 1907
Parastichtis Hübner, 1821
Parvispinia Babics, Kononenko & Saldaitis, 2012
Phoebophilus Staudinger, 1888
Properigea Barnes & Benjamin, 1927
Pseudanarta Grote, 1878
Pseudanthoecia Smith, 1883
Pseudobryomima Barnes & Benjamin, 1927
Rhiza Staudinger, 1889
Rhynchaglaea Hampson, 1906
Selicanis Smith, 1900
Solgaitiana Laporte, 1984
Sugitania Matsumura, 1926
Syrrusoides Laporte, 1972
Teratoglaea Sugi, 1958
Tracheplexia Janse, 1937
Tumidifrontia Hampson, 1902
Wiltshireola Hacker, 2001
Xenotrachea Sugi, 1958

Not assigned to a tribe

Acroriodes Hampson, 1909
Amefrontia Hampson, 1899
Anagnorisma Ronkay & Varga, 2000
Andesia Hampson, 1906
Apsarasa Moore, 1868
Ariathisa Walker, 1865
Bagada Walker, 1858
Bathytricha Turner, 1920
Benshirachia Gyulai, Varga & Ronkay, 2002
Boursinia Brandt, 1938
Brachytegma Berio, 1962
Bryogramma Schaus, 1911
Bryomoia Staudinger, 1892
Bryoxena Varga, Ronkay & Hacker, 1990
Buciara Walker, 1869
Cassania Berio, 1972
Chalconyx Sugi, 1982
Clethrorasa Hampson, 1910
Cosmodes Guenée, 1852
Dallolmoia Berio, 1972
Daseochaeta Warren, 1907
Dasygaster Guenée, 1852
Dipterygina Sugi, 1954
Doerriesa Staudinger, 1900
Ectopatria Hampson, 1903
Effractilis Berio, 1977
Haliophyle Warren, 1912
Hoeneidia Boursin, 1954
Hypernaenia Hampson, 1894
Iambia Walker, 1863
Ichneutica Meyrick, 1887
Ikondiana Berio, 1972
Leucocosmia Butler, 1886
Lignispalta Holloway, 1989
Mabilleana Fletcher & Viette, 1962
Malotia Krüger, 2005
Manga Bowden, 1956
Matopo Distant, 1898
Mentaxya Geyer, 1837
Mesocrapex Matsumura, 1929
Meterana Butler, 1877
Micragrotis Hampson, 1903
Mionides Hampson, 1902
Mudaria Moore, 1893
Myalila Strand, 1909
Nacopa Barnes & Benjamin, 1924
Neumichtis Hampson, 1906
Neuranethes Bethune-Baker, 1911
Neurois Hampson, 1903
Nezonycta Varga & Ronkay, 1991
Nivetica Hoare, 2019
Ochrocalama Hampson, 1910
Odontoretha Hampson, 1916
Oenoptera Hampson, 1910
Oligarcha Varga, Ronkay & Gyulai, 1995
Opigena Boisduval, 1840
Pachythrix Turner, 1942
Pansemna Turner, 1920
Paraxestia Hampson, 1903
Pastona Walker, 1858
Phalerodes Hampson, 1908
Phoperigea Viette, 1965
Physetica Meyrick, 1887
Plantea Hacker & Ronkay, 1996
Plusiophaes Prout, 1921
Praina Schaus, 1898
Procrateria Hampson, 1905
Proteuxoa Hampson, 1903
Protognorisma Ronkay & Varga, 2000
Protomiselia Sugi, 1958
Psaphara Walker, 1857
Pseudoleucania Staudinger, 1899
Ramesodes Hampson, 1908
Satrapodes Hampson, 1910
Schizognorisma Ronkay & Varga, 2000
Sineugraphe Boursin, 1954
Spinipalpa Alphéraky, 1892
Syntheta Turner, 1902
Turacina
Xenophysa Boursin, 1969
Xestioplexia Gyulai, 2015
Xylopolia Sugi, 1982
Yepcalphis Nye, 1975
