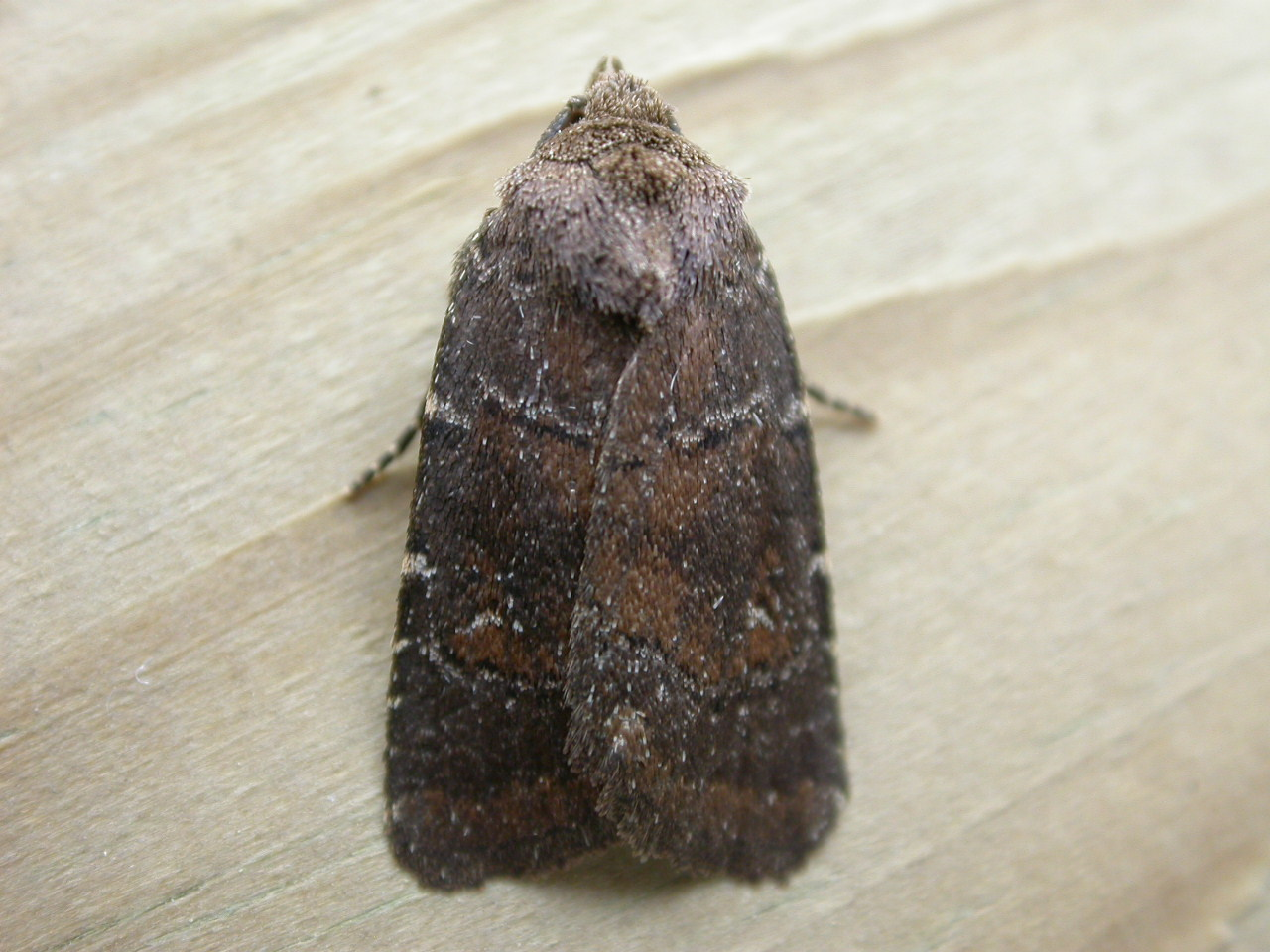

Scientific classification
- Kingdom: Animalia
- Phylum: Arthropoda
- Clade: Pancrustacea
- Class: Insecta
- Order: Lepidoptera
- Superfamily: Noctuoidea
- Family: Noctuidae
- Genus: Rusina
- Species: R. ferruginea

Binomial name
- Rusina ferruginea (Esper, 1785)

Synonyms
- Charanyca ferruginea (Esper, 1785)

= Rusina ferruginea =

Species of moth

The brown rustic (Rusina ferruginea) is a species of moth of the family Noctuidae. It is found in Europe. then East across the Palearctic to the Sayan Mountains in Central Asia.

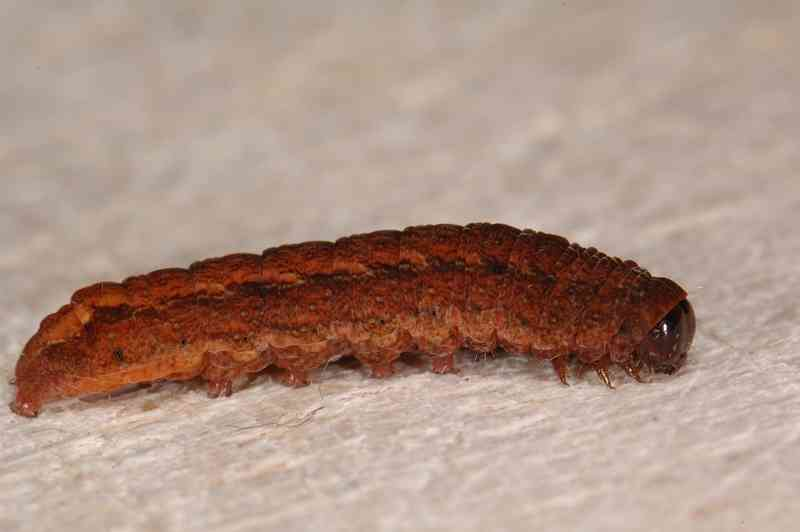
Larva

The wingspan is 32–40 mm. The ground colour of the forewings is dark brown. A series of small white marks run along the costa. The stigmata are not well defined. The antemedian line runs obliquely from the costa and is darker than the ground colour. The postmedian line is fine and also darker than ground colour. The subterminal line is dark and irregular. The hindwings are yellow brown, with darker veins and a small discal spot. Adult caterpillars are reddish-brown ground. The yellow-white dorsal line is very narrow, as are the clear secondary back lines. The posterior segments of the body have blackish slashes. The lateral stripe is grey-brown, the stigma black and the head dark brown.

The moth flies from June to July depending on the location.

The larvae feed on various herbaceous plants, including Rumex species.
