= Syntheta =

Scientific classification
- Domain: Eukaryota
- Kingdom: Animalia
- Phylum: Arthropoda
- Class: Insecta
- Order: Lepidoptera
- Superfamily: Noctuoidea
- Family: Noctuidae
- Genus: Syntheta; Turner, 1902

Genus of moths

Syntheta is a genus of moths of the family Noctuidae.

== Species ==
- Syntheta novaguinensis (Bethune-Baker, 1906)
- Syntheta xylitis Turner, 1902
