= Virgo (moth) =

Scientific classification
- Domain: Eukaryota
- Kingdom: Animalia
- Phylum: Arthropoda
- Class: Insecta
- Order: Lepidoptera
- Superfamily: Noctuoidea
- Family: Noctuidae
- Genus: Virgo; Staudinger, 1892

Genus of moths

Virgo is a genus of moths of the family Noctuidae.

== Species ==
- Virgo datanidia Butler, 1885
