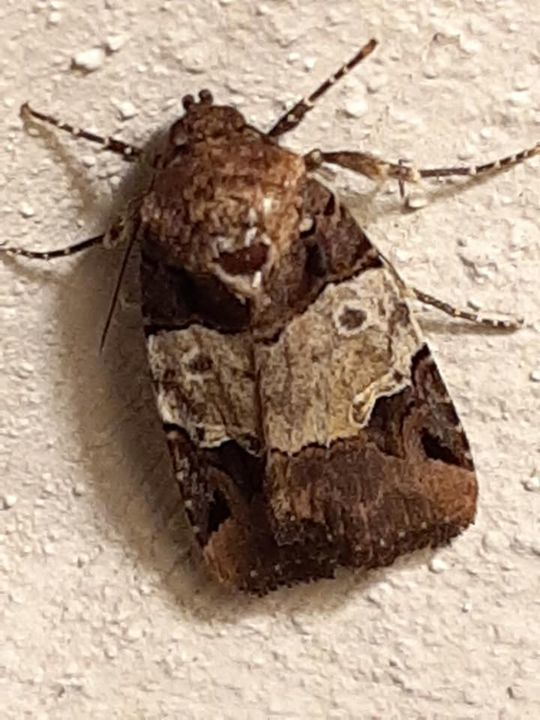
- Hampsonodes melagona

Scientific classification
- Domain: Eukaryota
- Kingdom: Animalia
- Phylum: Arthropoda
- Class: Insecta
- Order: Lepidoptera
- Superfamily: Noctuoidea
- Family: Noctuidae
- Genus: Hampsonodes; Nye, 1975

= Hampsonodes =

Genus of moths

Hampsonodes is a genus of moths in the family Noctuidae.

== Species ==
The following species are recognised in the genus Hampsonodes:

- Hampsonodes albiornis (Druce, 1908)
- Hampsonodes ampliplaga (Walker, 1858)
- Hampsonodes aperiens (Walker, 1857)
- Hampsonodes atrosignata (Zerny, 1916)
- Hampsonodes basicarnea (Walker, 1857)
- Hampsonodes bicornuta (Berio, 1966)
- Hampsonodes bilineata (Maassen, 1890)
- Hampsonodes comaltepeca (Berio, 1966)
- Hampsonodes confisa (Schaus, 1911)
- Hampsonodes dislocata (Walker, [1857])
- Hampsonodes divisa (Berio, 1966)
- Hampsonodes ferrealis (Hampson, 1918)
- Hampsonodes fuscoma (Schaus, 1906)
- Hampsonodes grandimacula (Guenée, 1852)
- Hampsonodes infirma (Schaus, 1894)
- Hampsonodes latifascia (Walker, 1865)
- Hampsonodes leucographa (Hampson, 1910)
- Hampsonodes leucopis (Hampson, 1918)
- Hampsonodes lilacina (E. D. Jones, 1914)
- Hampsonodes maneti (Schaus, 1912)
- Hampsonodes mastoides (Hampson, 1910)
- Hampsonodes melagona (Hampson, 1910)
- Hampsonodes mesochroa (Hampson, 1910)
- Hampsonodes naevia (Guenée, 1852)
- Hampsonodes obconica (Druce, 1908)
- Hampsonodes oliveata (Hampson, 1910)
- Hampsonodes orbica (Hampson, 1910)
- Hampsonodes parta (Schaus, 1894)
- Hampsonodes promentoria (Dognin, 1907)
- Hampsonodes pygmaea (Hampson, 1914)
- Hampsonodes retracta (Hampson, 1910)
- Hampsonodes rhodopis (Druce, 1908)
- Hampsonodes rufula (Dognin, 1907)
- Hampsonodes xanthea (E. D. Jones, 1908)
