= Leucotrachea =

Scientific classification
- Domain: Eukaryota
- Kingdom: Animalia
- Phylum: Arthropoda
- Class: Insecta
- Order: Lepidoptera
- Superfamily: Noctuoidea
- Family: Noctuidae
- Genus: Leucotrachea; Janse, 1937

Genus of moths

Leucotrachea is a genus of moths of the family Noctuidae.

== Species ==
- Leucotrachea leucomelanica Janse, 1937
- Leucotrachea melanobasis (Hampson, 1902)
- Leucotrachea melanodonta (Hampson, 1908)
- Leucotrachea melanoleuca (Hampson, 1902)
