= Alastria =

Scientific classification
- Domain: Eukaryota
- Kingdom: Animalia
- Phylum: Arthropoda
- Class: Insecta
- Order: Lepidoptera
- Superfamily: Noctuoidea
- Family: Noctuidae
- Genus: Alastria; Lafontaine & J.T. Troubridge, 2004

Genus of moths

Alastria is a genus of moths of the family Noctuidae.

== Species ==
- Alastria chico Lafontaine & Troubridge, 2004
