= Basistriga =

Scientific classification
- Domain: Eukaryota
- Kingdom: Animalia
- Phylum: Arthropoda
- Class: Insecta
- Order: Lepidoptera
- Superfamily: Noctuoidea
- Family: Noctuidae
- Subfamily: Noctuinae
- Genus: Basistriga; Fibiger & Lafontaine, 1997

Genus of moths

Basistriga is a genus of moths of the family Noctuidae.

== Selected species ==
- Basistriga flammatra Schiffermüller, 1775
- Basistriga herculea Corti & Draudt, 1933
