= Lignispalta =

Scientific classification
- Kingdom: Animalia
- Phylum: Arthropoda
- Clade: Pancrustacea
- Class: Insecta
- Order: Lepidoptera
- Superfamily: Noctuoidea
- Family: Noctuidae
- Genus: Lignispalta; Holloway, 1989

Genus of moths

Lignispalta is a genus of moths of the family Noctuidae.

== Species ==
- Lignispalta caerulea (Robinson, 1969)
- Lignispalta diversisigna (Prout, 1928)
- Lignispalta incertissima (Bethune-Baker, 1906)
- Lignispalta viridaria (Swinhoe, 1902)
