= Dimorphinoctua =

Scientific classification
- Kingdom: Animalia
- Phylum: Arthropoda
- Clade: Pancrustacea
- Class: Insecta
- Order: Lepidoptera
- Superfamily: Noctuoidea
- Family: Noctuidae
- Subfamily: Noctuinae
- Genus: Dimorphinoctua; Viette, 1952

Species
- Dimorphinoctua cunhaensis Viette, 1952; Dimorphinoctua goughensis Fletcher, 1963; Dimorphinoctua pilifera Walker, 1857

Genus of moths

Dimorphinoctua is a genus of moths belonging to the family Noctuidae. All species within this genus are endemic to Tristan da Cunha.
