= Matopo =

Scientific classification
- Domain: Eukaryota
- Kingdom: Animalia
- Phylum: Arthropoda
- Class: Insecta
- Order: Lepidoptera
- Superfamily: Noctuoidea
- Family: Noctuidae
- Genus: Matopo; Distant, 1898

Type species
- Matopo typica Distant, 1898

Synonyms
- Gigaglossa Berio, 1966

Genus of moths

Matopo is a genus of moths of the family Noctuidae. The genus was erected by William Lucas Distant in 1898.

== Species ==
- Matopo actinophora Hampson, 1909 Kenya, Tanzania
- Matopo berhanoui Laporte, 1984 Ethiopia
- Matopo descarpentriesi (Laporte, 1975)
- Matopo giacomellii Dognin, 1916 Argentina
- Matopo heterochroa Hampson, 1916 Somalia
- Matopo inangulata Hampson, 1909 Zimbabwe
- Matopo neotropicalis Jones, 1908 Brazil (Paraná)
- Matopo oberthueri Viette, 1965 Madagascar
- Matopo plurilineata Berio, 1955 Madagascar
- Matopo scutulata Janse, 1938 South Africa
- Matopo selecta (Walker, 1865) Punjab, Bombay, Senegal, Nigeria, Chad, Sudan, Egypt
- Matopo socotrensis Hacker & Saldaitis, 2010 Sokotra
- Matopo subarida Viette, 1976 Madagascar
- Matopo tamsi Kiriakoff, 1954 Zaire
- Matopo typica Distant, 1898 South Africa, Zimbabwe
