= Peraniana =

Scientific classification
- Domain: Eukaryota
- Kingdom: Animalia
- Phylum: Arthropoda
- Class: Insecta
- Order: Lepidoptera
- Superfamily: Noctuoidea
- Family: Noctuidae
- Genus: Peraniana; Strand, 1942

Genus of moths

Peraniana is a genus of moths of the family Noctuidae.

== Species ==
- Peraniana dissociata (Barnes & McDunnough, 1910)
