= Cyrebia =

Scientific classification
- Kingdom: Animalia
- Phylum: Arthropoda
- Class: Insecta
- Order: Lepidoptera
- Superfamily: Noctuoidea
- Family: Noctuidae
- Subfamily: Noctuinae
- Genus: Cyrebia; Guenée in Boisduval & Guenée, 1852

Genus of moths

Cyrebia is a genus of moths of the family Noctuidae.

== Species ==
- Cyrebia anachoreta (Herrich-Schäffer, 1851)
- Cyrebia luperinoides Guenée, 1852
