= Leumicamia =

Scientific classification
- Kingdom: Animalia
- Phylum: Arthropoda
- Clade: Pancrustacea
- Class: Insecta
- Order: Lepidoptera
- Superfamily: Noctuoidea
- Family: Noctuidae
- Genus: Leumicamia; Viette, 1965

Genus of moths

Leumicamia is a genus of moths of the family Noctuidae described by Pierre Viette in 1965.

== Species ==
- Leumicamia graminicolens (Butler, 1878)
- Leumicamia illustris Laporte, 1977
- Leumicamia leucosoma (Felder & Rogenhofer, 1874)
- Leumicamia oreias (D. S. Fletcher, 1959)
- Leumicamia palustris Laporte, 1976
- Leumicamia venustissima (Laporte, 1974)
