= Polytelodes =

Scientific classification
- Kingdom: Animalia
- Phylum: Arthropoda
- Class: Insecta
- Order: Lepidoptera
- Superfamily: Noctuoidea
- Family: Noctuidae
- Genus: Polytelodes; Hampson, 1905

Genus of moths

Polytelodes is a genus of moths of the family Noctuidae.

== Species ==
- Polytelodes florifera (Walker, 1858)
