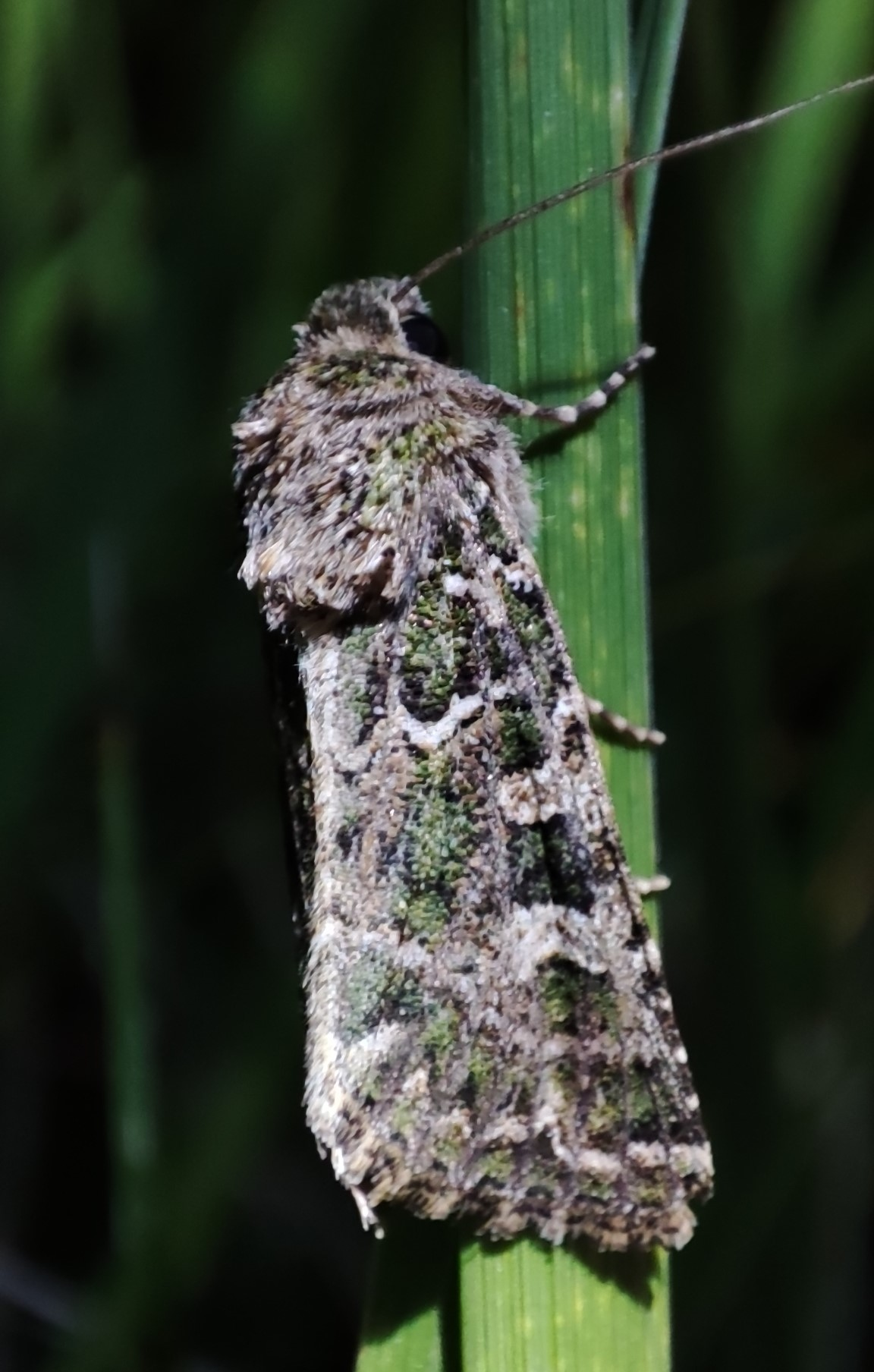

Scientific classification
- Kingdom: Animalia
- Phylum: Arthropoda
- Class: Insecta
- Order: Lepidoptera
- Superfamily: Noctuoidea
- Family: Noctuidae
- Subfamily: Xyleninae
- Genus: Hampsonicola; Ronkay, Zilli & Fibiger, 2009
- Species: H. deccerti

Binomial name
- Hampsonicola deccerti (Hampson, 1908)

Synonyms
- (Genus): Hedina Ronkay, Zilli & Fibiger 2005 (Preoccupied by Hedina Alberti, 1954); (Species): Eremobia deccerti Hampson, 1908; Hadena pseudotrachea Krulikovsky, 1909; Eremobia deckerti; Hedina deccerti

= Hampsonicola =

Hampsonicola deccerti

Genus of moths

Hampsonicola is a monotypic genus of moths of the family Noctuidae.
