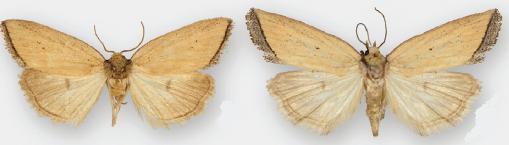
- Female (left) and male

Scientific classification
- Domain: Eukaryota
- Kingdom: Animalia
- Phylum: Arthropoda
- Class: Insecta
- Order: Lepidoptera
- Superfamily: Noctuoidea
- Family: Noctuidae
- Subfamily: Noctuinae
- Genus: Pseudomarimatha; Ferris & Lafontaine, 2010
- Species: P. flava

Binomial name
- Pseudomarimatha flava Ferris & Lafontaine, 2010

= Pseudomarimatha =

Genus of moths

Pseudomarimatha is a monotypic moth genus of the family Noctuidae. Its only species, Pseudomarimatha flava, is known from the western United States only in south-eastern Arizona and south-western New Mexico. Both the genus and species were first described by Clifford D. Ferris and J. Donald Lafontaine in 2010.

Adults are on wing from late June to mid-August.
