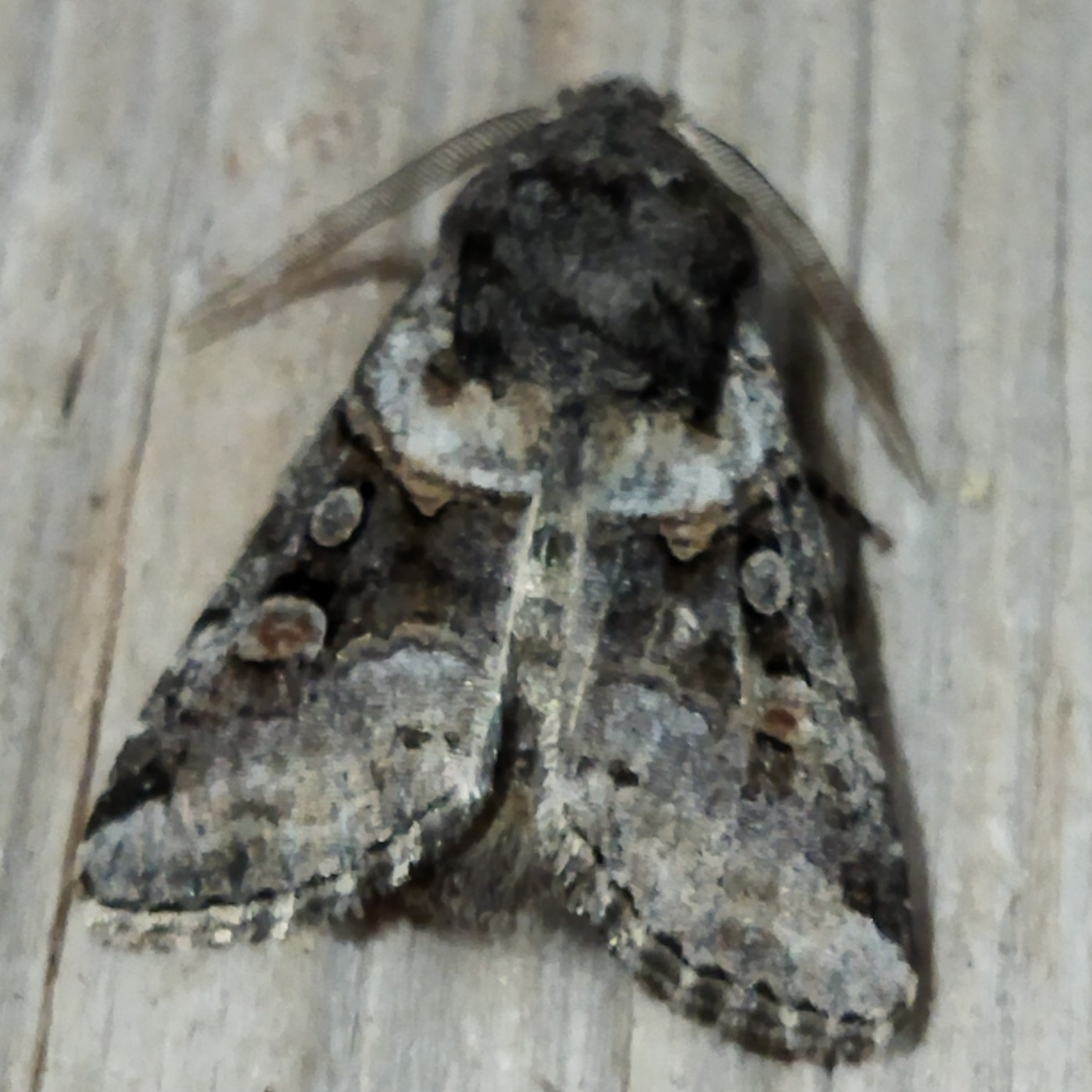

Scientific classification
- Domain: Eukaryota
- Kingdom: Animalia
- Phylum: Arthropoda
- Class: Insecta
- Order: Lepidoptera
- Superfamily: Noctuoidea
- Family: Noctuidae
- Genus: Cleoceris; Boisduval, 1836
- Species: Cleoceris

Binomial name
- Cleoceris (Esper, 1789)

= Cleoceris =

Cleoceris scoriacea

Genus of moths

Cleoceris is a genus of moths in the family Noctuidae. It is monotypic, being represented by the single species Cleoceris scoriacea.
