= Acroria =

Scientific classification
- Kingdom: Animalia
- Phylum: Arthropoda
- Class: Insecta
- Order: Lepidoptera
- Superfamily: Noctuoidea
- Family: Noctuidae
- Genus: Acroria; Walker, 1858

Genus of moths

Acroria is a genus of moths of the family Noctuidae erected by Francis Walker in 1858.

== Species ==
- Acroria chloegrapha (Hampson, 1908)
- Acroria postalbida (Dyar, 1914)
- Acroria terens (Walker, 1857)
- Acroria viridirena (E. D. Jones, 1912)
