= Bryoxena =

Scientific classification
- Domain: Eukaryota
- Kingdom: Animalia
- Phylum: Arthropoda
- Class: Insecta
- Order: Lepidoptera
- Superfamily: Noctuoidea
- Family: Noctuidae
- Subfamily: Xyleninae
- Genus: Bryoxena; Varga, Ronkay & Hacker, 1990

Genus of moths

Bryoxena is a genus of moths of the family Noctuidae.

== Species ==
- Bryoxena centralasiae (Staudinger, 1882)
