= Tracheplexia =

Scientific classification
- Domain: Eukaryota
- Kingdom: Animalia
- Phylum: Arthropoda
- Class: Insecta
- Order: Lepidoptera
- Superfamily: Noctuoidea
- Family: Noctuidae
- Genus: Tracheplexia; Janse, 1937

Species of moth

Tracheplexia is a genus of moths of the family Noctuidae described by Anthonie Johannes Theodorus Janse in 1937.

== Species ==
- Tracheplexia amaranta (Felder & Rogenhofer, 1874)
- Tracheplexia conservuloides Berio, 1966
- Tracheplexia debilis (Butler, 1879)
- Tracheplexia galleyi Viette, 1981
- Tracheplexia leguerni Laporte, 1984
- Tracheplexia lucia (Felder & Rogenhofer, 1874)
- Tracheplexia richinii Berio, 1973
- Tracheplexia schista D. S. Fletcher, 1961
