= Oenoptera =

Scientific classification
- Kingdom: Animalia
- Phylum: Arthropoda
- Class: Insecta
- Order: Lepidoptera
- Superfamily: Noctuoidea
- Family: Noctuidae
- Subfamily: Acontiinae
- Genus: Oenoptera; Hampson, 1910

Genus of moths

Oenoptera is a genus of moths of the family Noctuidae, found in Sri Lanka (by George Hampson) and French Guiana (by William Schaus).

== Species ==
- Oenoptera acidalica Hampson 1910
- Oenoptera albimacula Hampson 1918
- Oenoptera leda Schaus 1914
- Oenoptera purpurea Hampson 1910
- Oenoptera rhea Schaus 1914
