= Palaeagrotis =

Scientific classification
- Kingdom: Animalia
- Phylum: Arthropoda
- Class: Insecta
- Order: Lepidoptera
- Superfamily: Noctuoidea
- Family: Noctuidae
- Subfamily: Noctuinae
- Genus: Palaeagrotis; Hampson, 1907

Genus of moths

Palaeagrotis is a genus of moths of the family Noctuidae.

== Species ==
- Palaeagrotis inops (Lederer, 1853)
