= Procrateria =

Scientific classification
- Domain: Eukaryota
- Kingdom: Animalia
- Phylum: Arthropoda
- Class: Insecta
- Order: Lepidoptera
- Superfamily: Noctuoidea
- Family: Noctuidae
- Genus: Procrateria

Genus of moths

Procrateria is a genus of moths of the family Noctuidae.

== Species ==
- Procrateria basifascia Pinhey 1968
- Procrateria malagassa Viette 1961
- Procrateria melanoleuca Hampson 1910
- Procrateria noloides Hampson 1905
- Procrateria pterota Hampson 1909
