= Xanthocosmia =

Scientific classification
- Kingdom: Animalia
- Phylum: Arthropoda
- Clade: Pancrustacea
- Class: Insecta
- Order: Lepidoptera
- Superfamily: Noctuoidea
- Family: Noctuidae
- Genus: Xanthocosmia; Sugi, 1982

Genus of moths

Xanthocosmia is a genus of moths of the family Noctuidae.

== Species ==
- Xanthocosmia jankowskii (Oberthür, 1884)
