= Plantea (moth) =

Scientific classification
- Domain: Eukaryota
- Kingdom: Animalia
- Phylum: Arthropoda
- Class: Insecta
- Order: Lepidoptera
- Superfamily: Noctuoidea
- Family: Noctuidae
- Subfamily: Cuculliinae
- Genus: Plantea; Hacker & Ronkay, 1996

Genus of moths

Plantea is a genus of moths of the family Noctuidae.

== Species ==
- Plantea aulombardi (Plante, 1991)
- Plantea fidahusseini (Ronkay, Ronkay, Gyulai and Hacker, 2010)
