= Bathytricha =

Scientific classification
- Domain: Eukaryota
- Kingdom: Animalia
- Phylum: Arthropoda
- Class: Insecta
- Order: Lepidoptera
- Superfamily: Noctuoidea
- Family: Noctuidae
- Genus: Bathytricha; Turner, 1920

Genus of moths

Bathytricha is a genus of moths of the family Noctuidae.

== Species ==
- Bathytricha aethalion Turner, 1944
- Bathytricha leonina (Walker, 1865)
- Bathytricha monticola Turner, 1925
- Bathytricha phaeosticha Turner, 1931
- Bathytricha truncata (Walker, 1856)
