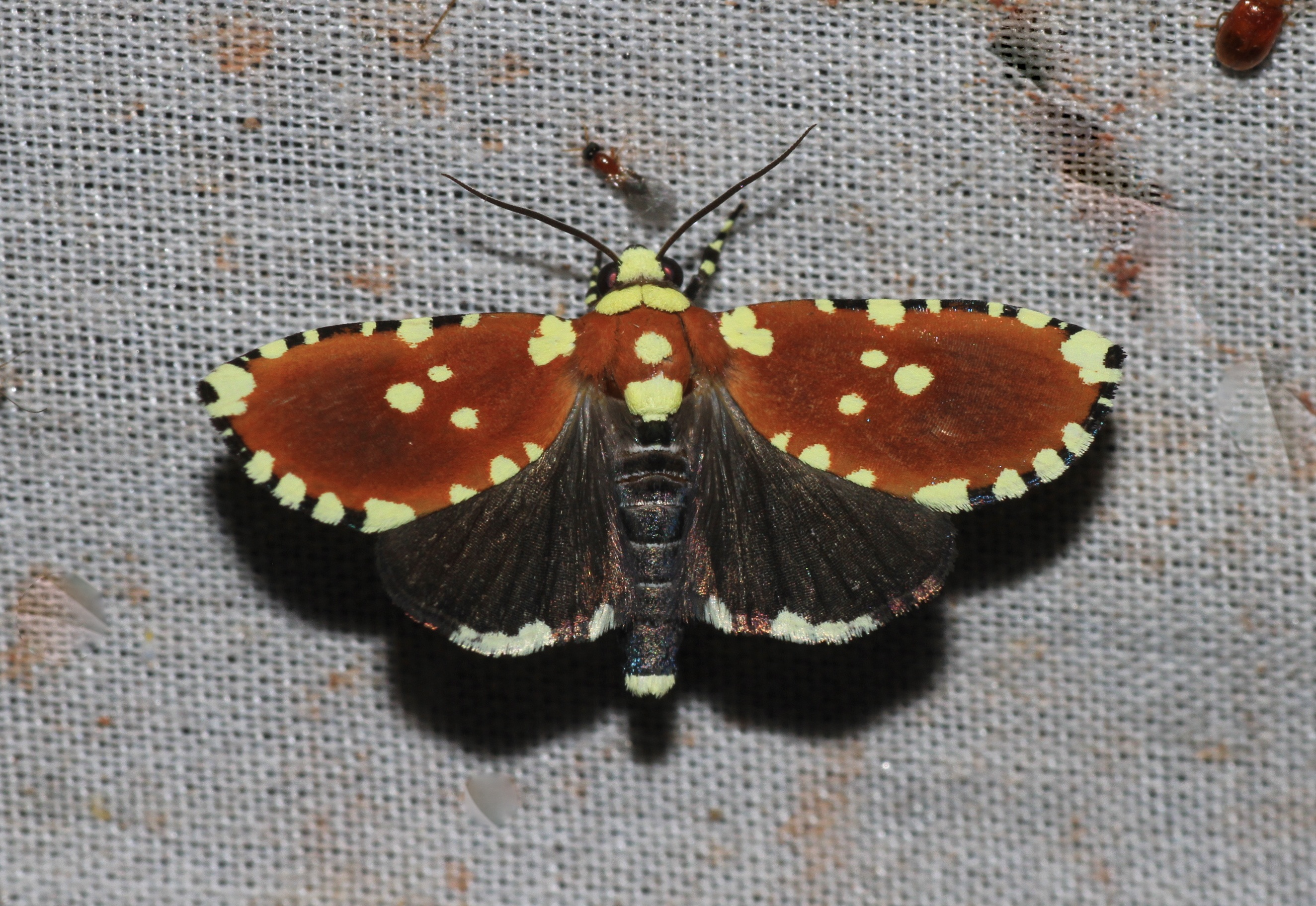

Scientific classification
- Domain: Eukaryota
- Kingdom: Animalia
- Phylum: Arthropoda
- Class: Insecta
- Order: Lepidoptera
- Superfamily: Noctuoidea
- Family: Noctuidae
- Genus: Yepcalphis; Nye, 1975
- Species: Y. dilectissima

Binomial name
- Yepcalphis dilectissima (Walker, 1858)

Synonyms
- Generic; Pachylepis Felder, 1874 (preocc.); Specific; Ariola dilectissima Walker, 1858; Pachylepis limacodina Felder, 1874

= Yepcalphis =

Genus of moths

Yepcalphis is a monotypic moth genus of the family Noctuidae erected by Nye in 1975. Its only species, Yepcalphis dilectissima, was first described by Francis Walker in 1858. It is found in Sri Lanka, the Oriental tropics, the Philippines, Sulawesi and the Sula Islands.

== Description ==
The genus is described as: palpi upturned, short, smoothly scaled, and not reaching vertex of head. Antennae simple, somewhat thickened in the male. Thorax and abdomen tuftless. Forewings with non-crenulate cilia and stalked veins 7,8,9 and 10. Hindwings with veins 3,4 and 6,7 from angles of cell.

The species is described as: wingspan of the male is about 24 mm and the female 30 mm. Head and thorax bright ferrous colour. Vertex of head, collar and metathorax with some sulphur-yellowish patches. Abdomen black with narrow white rings, and a white anal tuft. Forewings also ferrous with a yellow patch. There is a series of costal specks and a medial series of spots consisting of a large costal spot, two spots towards the inner margin, and two small spots at the middle. A series of large marginal and cilial spots and two specks can be seen on inner margin. Hindwings black, with a series of white cilial spots. Ventral side variegated with white.

The larvae feed on Vitex species. They are found on the underside of the leaves of their host plant.

== Subspecies ==
- Yepcalphis dilectissima dilectissima
- Yepcalphis dilectissima cingalesa (Warren, 1913) (Sri Lanka)
- Yepcalphis dilectissima insulicola (Warren, 1913) (Oriental tropics, the Philippines, Sulawesi, Sula Islands)
