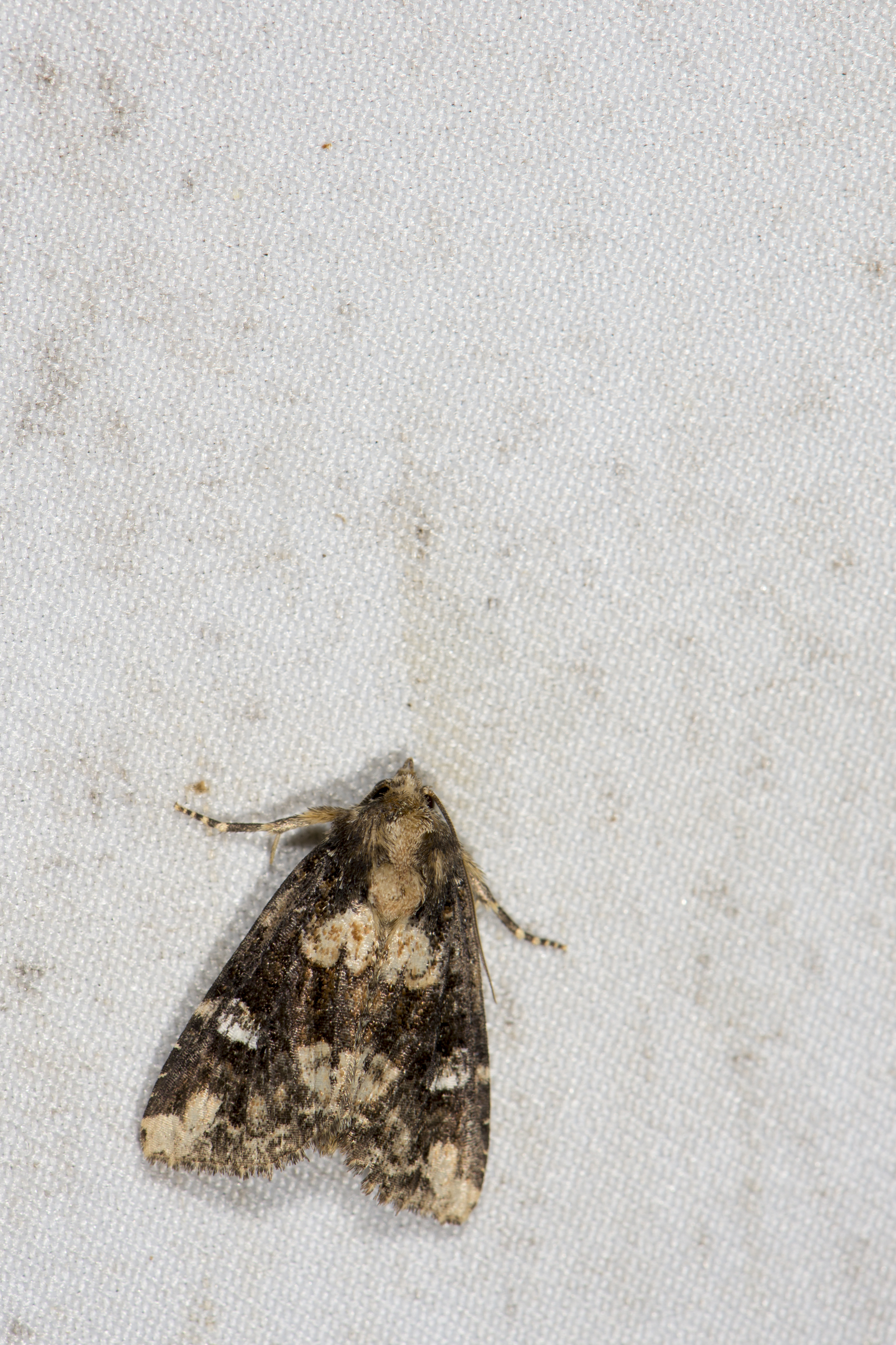

Scientific classification
- Kingdom: Animalia
- Phylum: Arthropoda
- Clade: Pancrustacea
- Class: Insecta
- Order: Lepidoptera
- Superfamily: Noctuoidea
- Family: Noctuidae
- Genus: Anapamea; Sugi in Inoue et al., 1982

= Anapamea =

Genus of moths

Anapamea is a genus of moths of the family Noctuidae.

Species include:

- Anapamea cuneatoides Poole, 1989
