= Litoligia =

Scientific classification
- Domain: Eukaryota
- Kingdom: Animalia
- Phylum: Arthropoda
- Class: Insecta
- Order: Lepidoptera
- Superfamily: Noctuoidea
- Family: Noctuidae
- Tribe: Apameini
- Genus: Litoligia; Beck, 1999

Genus of moths

Litoligia is a genus of moths belonging to the family Noctuidae.

The species of this genus are found in Europe and Japan.

Species:

- Litoligia literosa (Haworth, 1809)
