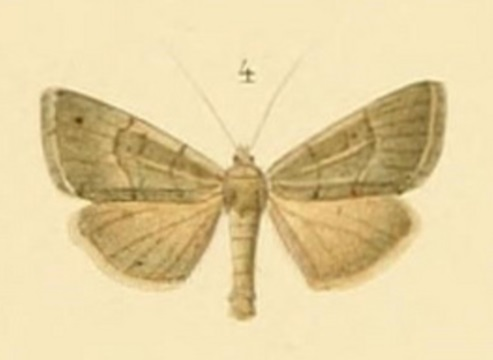
- S. paupera ♂.

Scientific classification
- Kingdom: Animalia
- Phylum: Arthropoda
- Class: Insecta
- Order: Lepidoptera
- Superfamily: Noctuoidea
- Family: Noctuidae
- Genus: Stenodrina; Boursin, 1937

Type species
- Caradrina paupera Romanoff, 1885

= Stenodrina =

Genus of moths

Stenodrina is a genus of moths of the family Noctuidae.

== Species ==
- Stenodrina aeschista Boursin, 1937
- Stenodrina agramma Brandt, 1938
- Stenodrina eudiopsis Boursin, 1960
- Stenodrina nitida (Püngeler, 1914)
- Stenodrina paupera (Romanoff, 1885)
