= Pareuplexia =

Scientific classification
- Kingdom: Animalia
- Phylum: Arthropoda
- Class: Insecta
- Order: Lepidoptera
- Superfamily: Noctuoidea
- Family: Noctuidae
- Genus: Pareuplexia; Warren in Setiz, 1911

Genus of insects

Pareuplexia is a genus of moths of the family Noctuidae.

== Species ==
- Pareuplexia chalybeata (Moore, 1867)
- Pareuplexia dissimulans (Warren, 1911)
- Pareuplexia erythriris (Hampson, 1908)
- Pareuplexia flammifera (Warren, 1911)
- Pareuplexia harfordi (Hampson, 1894)
- Pareuplexia humilis (Warren, 1911)
- Pareuplexia luteistigma (Warren, 1913)
- Pareuplexia metallica (Walker, 1865)
- Pareuplexia nigritula (Warren, 1911)
- Pareuplexia nitida (Warren, 1911)
- Pareuplexia pallidimargo (Warren, 1911)
- Pareuplexia quadripuncta (Warren, 1911)
- Pareuplexia ruficosta (Warren, 1911)
- Pareuplexia rufistigma (Warren, 1911)
