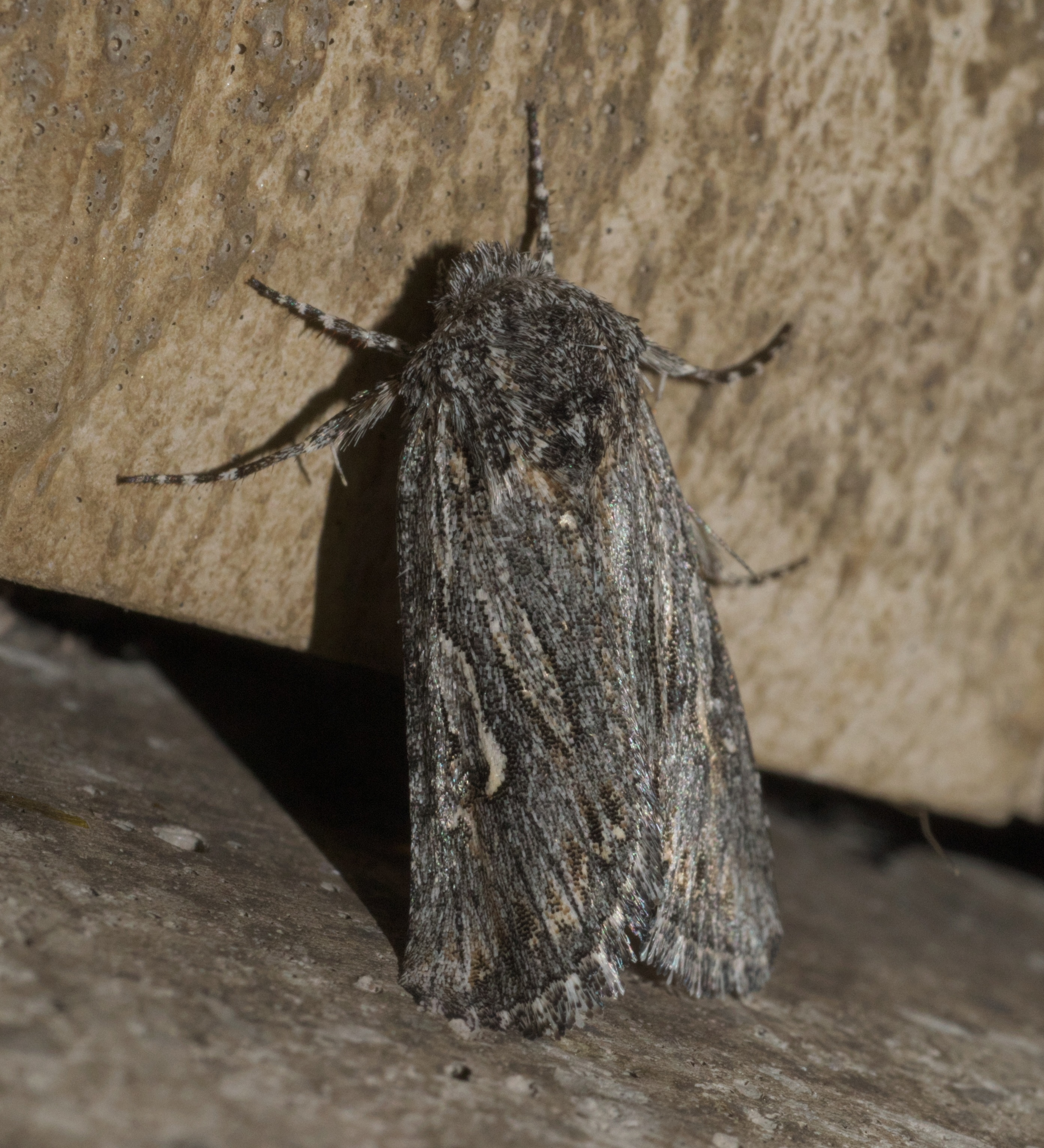
- Trichocerapoda strigata, Green River, Wyoming

Scientific classification
- Domain: Eukaryota
- Kingdom: Animalia
- Phylum: Arthropoda
- Class: Insecta
- Order: Lepidoptera
- Superfamily: Noctuoidea
- Family: Noctuidae
- Genus: Trichocerapoda; Benjamin, 1932

= Trichocerapoda =

Genus of moths

Trichocerapoda is a genus of moths of the family Noctuidae.

== Species ==
- Trichocerapoda comstocki Benjamin, 1932
- Trichocerapoda harbisoni Mustelin, 2006
- Trichocerapoda oblita (Grote, 1877)
- Trichocerapoda oceanis Robertson & Mustelin, 2006
- Trichocerapoda strigata (Smith, 1891)
