= Pseudenargia =

Scientific classification
- Domain: Eukaryota
- Kingdom: Animalia
- Phylum: Arthropoda
- Class: Insecta
- Order: Lepidoptera
- Superfamily: Noctuoidea
- Family: Noctuidae
- Genus: Pseudenargia; Boursin, 1956

Genus of moths

Pseudenargia is a genus of moths of the family Noctuidae.

== Species ==
- Pseudenargia deleta (Osthelder, 1933)
- Pseudenargia regina (Staudinger, 1891)
- Pseudenargia troodosi Svendsen, Nilsson & Fibiger, 1999
- Pseudenargia ulicis (Staudinger, 1859)
- Pseudenargia versicolora (Saalmuller, 1891)
- Pseudenargia viettei (Berio, 1955)
