= Praina =

- Praina temperata

Scientific classification
- Kingdom: Animalia
- Phylum: Arthropoda
- Clade: Pancrustacea
- Class: Insecta
- Order: Lepidoptera
- Superfamily: Noctuoidea
- Family: Noctuidae
- Subfamily: Noctuinae
- Genus: Praina; Schaus, 1898

Genus of moths

Praina is a genus of moths in the family Noctuidae.

== Species ==
The following species are recognised in the genus Praina:

- Praina castra Schaus, 1894
- Praina cirphidia Hampson, 1913
- Praina cirphioides Schaus, 1911
- Praina diagramma Jones, 1908
- Praina funebris Schaus, 1894
- Praina glaucochroa Dognin, 1908
- Praina irazuna Draudt, 1924
- Praina leucaniades Hampson, 1913
- Praina leucaniiformis Zerny, 1916
- Praina radiata Schaus, 1898
- Praina rufisigna Hampson, 1907
- Praina t-nigrum Guenée, 1852
- Praina trifasciata Hampson, 1909
- BOLD:AAF7495
