= Hyperfrontia =

Scientific classification
- Domain: Eukaryota
- Kingdom: Animalia
- Phylum: Arthropoda
- Class: Insecta
- Order: Lepidoptera
- Superfamily: Noctuoidea
- Family: Noctuidae
- Subfamily: Noctuinae
- Genus: Hyperfrontia; Berio, 1962

Genus of moths

Hyperfrontia is a genus of moths of the family Noctuidae.

== Type species ==
- Hyperfrontia direae Berio, 1962

== Species ==
Some species of this genus are:

- Hyperfrontia direae Berio, 1962
- Hyperfrontia kitenga Berio, 1977
- Hyperfrontia limbata Berio, 1962
- Hyperfrontia lory Berio, 1966
- Hyperfrontia semicirculosa (Gaede, 1935)
