= Trichopolia =

Scientific classification
- Kingdom: Animalia
- Phylum: Arthropoda
- Class: Insecta
- Order: Lepidoptera
- Superfamily: Noctuoidea
- Family: Noctuidae
- Genus: Trichopolia; Grote, 1883

Genus of moths

Trichopolia is a genus of moths of the family Noctuidae.

== Species ==
- Trichopolia dentatella Grote, 1883
- Trichopolia suspicionis Barnes & Benjamin, 1920
