= Parapamea =

Scientific classification
- Domain: Eukaryota
- Kingdom: Animalia
- Phylum: Arthropoda
- Class: Insecta
- Order: Lepidoptera
- Superfamily: Noctuoidea
- Family: Noctuidae
- Genus: Parapamea; Bird, 1927

Genus of moths

Parapamea is a genus of moths of the family Noctuidae.

== Species ==
- Parapamea buffaloensis (Grote, 1877)
