= Selicanis =

Scientific classification
- Kingdom: Animalia
- Phylum: Arthropoda
- Clade: Pancrustacea
- Class: Insecta
- Order: Lepidoptera
- Superfamily: Noctuoidea
- Family: Noctuidae
- Genus: Selicanis; Smith, 1900

Genus of moths

Selicanis is a genus of moths of the family Noctuidae.

== Species ==
- Selicanis cinereola Smith, 1900
