= Pansemna =

Scientific classification
- Kingdom: Animalia
- Phylum: Arthropoda
- Class: Insecta
- Order: Lepidoptera
- Superfamily: Noctuoidea
- Family: Noctuidae
- Genus: Pansemna; Turner, 1920

Genus of moths

Pansemna is a genus of moths of the family Noctuidae.

== Species ==
- Pansemna beryllodes (Turner, 1903)
