= Ctenostola =

Scientific classification
- Kingdom: Animalia
- Phylum: Arthropoda
- Clade: Pancrustacea
- Class: Insecta
- Order: Lepidoptera
- Superfamily: Noctuoidea
- Family: Noctuidae
- Genus: Ctenostola; Sugi, 1982

Genus of moths

Ctenostola is a genus of moths of the family Noctuidae.

== Species ==
- Ctenostola sparganoides (Bang-Haas, 1927)
