= Oligarcha =

Scientific classification
- Domain: Eukaryota
- Kingdom: Animalia
- Phylum: Arthropoda
- Class: Insecta
- Order: Lepidoptera
- Superfamily: Noctuoidea
- Family: Noctuidae
- Subfamily: Noctuinae
- Genus: Oligarcha; Varga, Ronkay & Guylai, 1995

Genus of moths

Oligarcha is a genus of moths of the family Noctuidae.

== Species ==
- Oligarcha coryphaea (Püngeler, 1900)
