= Metappana =

Scientific classification
- Kingdom: Animalia
- Phylum: Arthropoda
- Class: Insecta
- Order: Lepidoptera
- Superfamily: Noctuoidea
- Family: Noctuidae
- Genus: Metappana; Viette, 1965

Genus of moths

Metappana is a genus of moths of the family Noctuidae.

== Species ==
- Metappana crescentica (Hampson, 1910)
