= Phoebophilus =

Scientific classification
- Domain: Eukaryota
- Kingdom: Animalia
- Phylum: Arthropoda
- Class: Insecta
- Order: Lepidoptera
- Superfamily: Noctuoidea
- Family: Noctuidae
- Genus: Phoebophilus; Staudinger, 1888

Genus of moths

Phoebophilus is a genus of moths of the family Noctuidae.

== Species ==
- Phoebophilus amoenus Staudinger, 1888
- Phoebophilus dolius Püngeler, 1902
- Phoebophilus veternosa (Püngeler, 1907)
