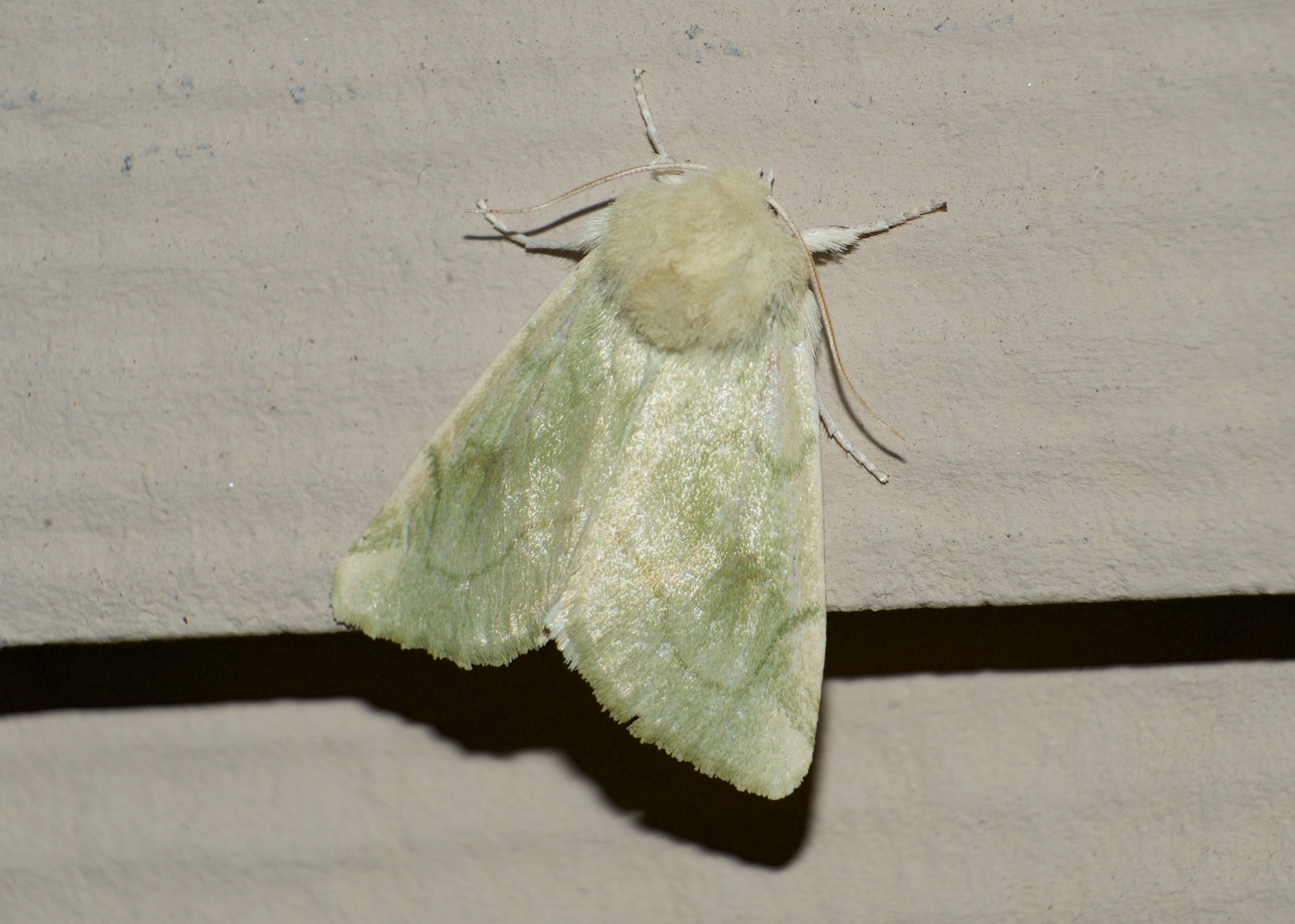
- Zotheca tranquilla

Scientific classification
- Kingdom: Animalia
- Phylum: Arthropoda
- Clade: Pancrustacea
- Class: Insecta
- Order: Lepidoptera
- Superfamily: Noctuoidea
- Family: Noctuidae
- Subfamily: Xyleninae
- Tribe: Xylenini
- Subtribe: Cosmiina
- Genus: Zotheca; Grote, 1874

= Zotheca =

Genus of moths

Zotheca is a monotypic genus of moths of the family Noctuidae. It contains one species: Zotheca tranquilla, or the elder moth. It is found in western North America.

== Description ==
Adult elder moths are usually pale green, although some tan specimens have been recorded. The forewings are light green with darker green markings. The hindwings are white. Adults are on wing in the summer.

Larva have a pattern of yellow, black, and purple.

== Habitat and host plant ==
Elder moths are found in riparian habitats and moist forest habitats. The larvae feed on Sambucus (elderberry) plants.

== Gallery ==
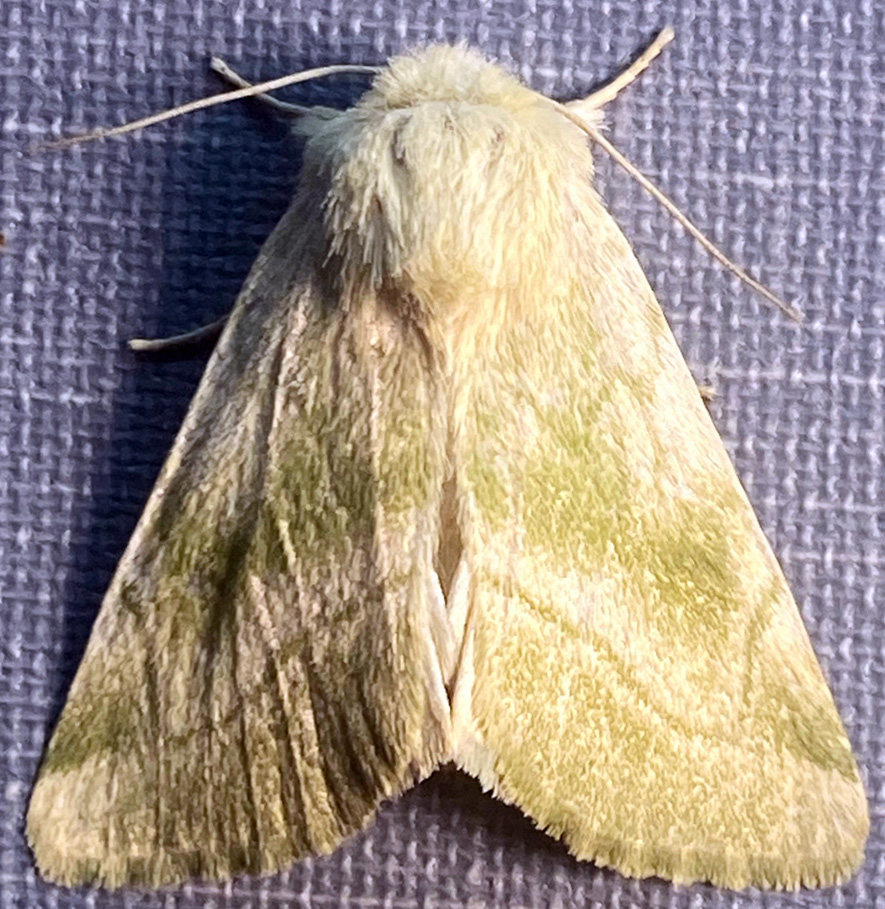
Zotheca tranquilla viewed from above

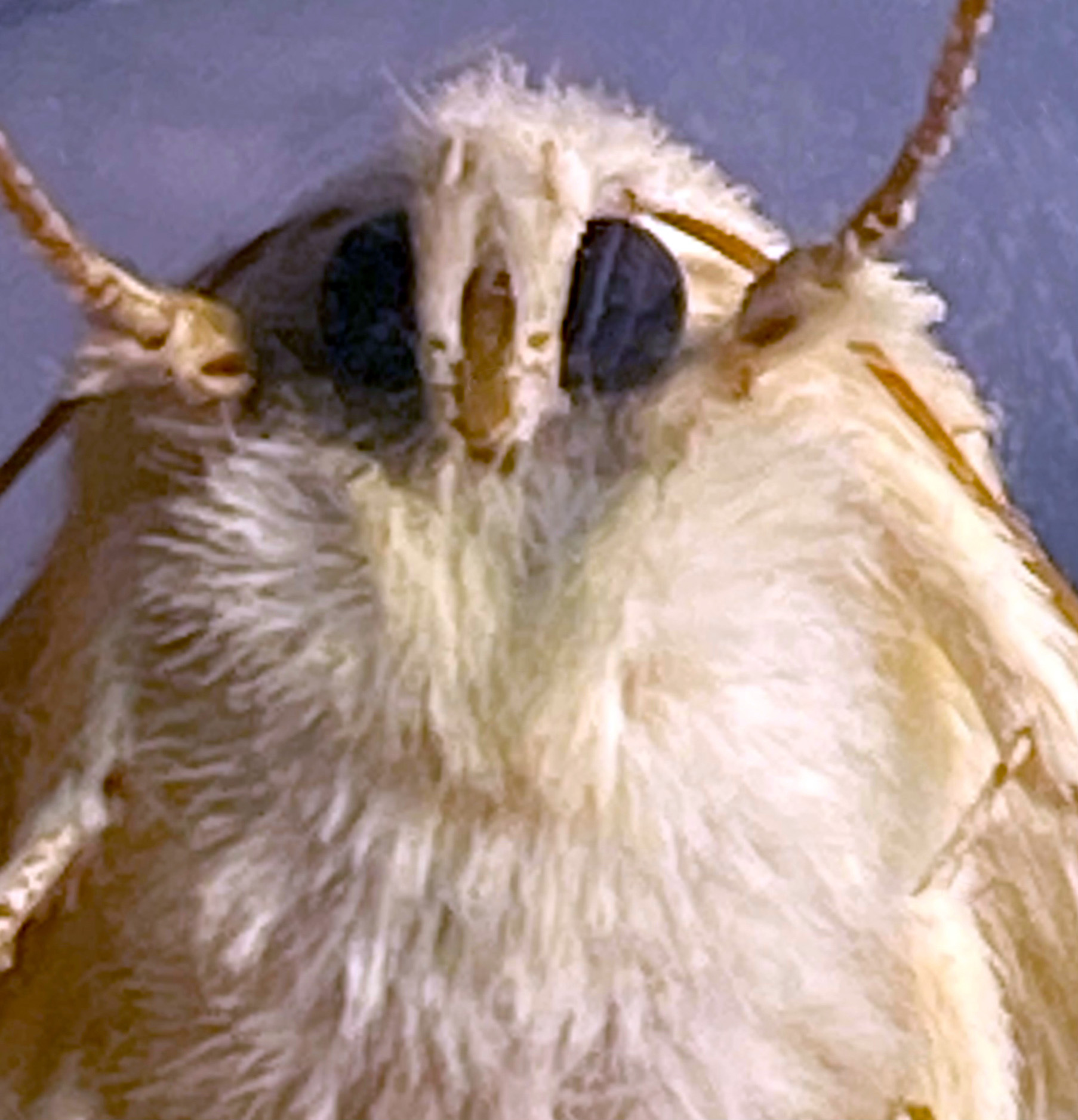
Zotheca tranquilla close up of face

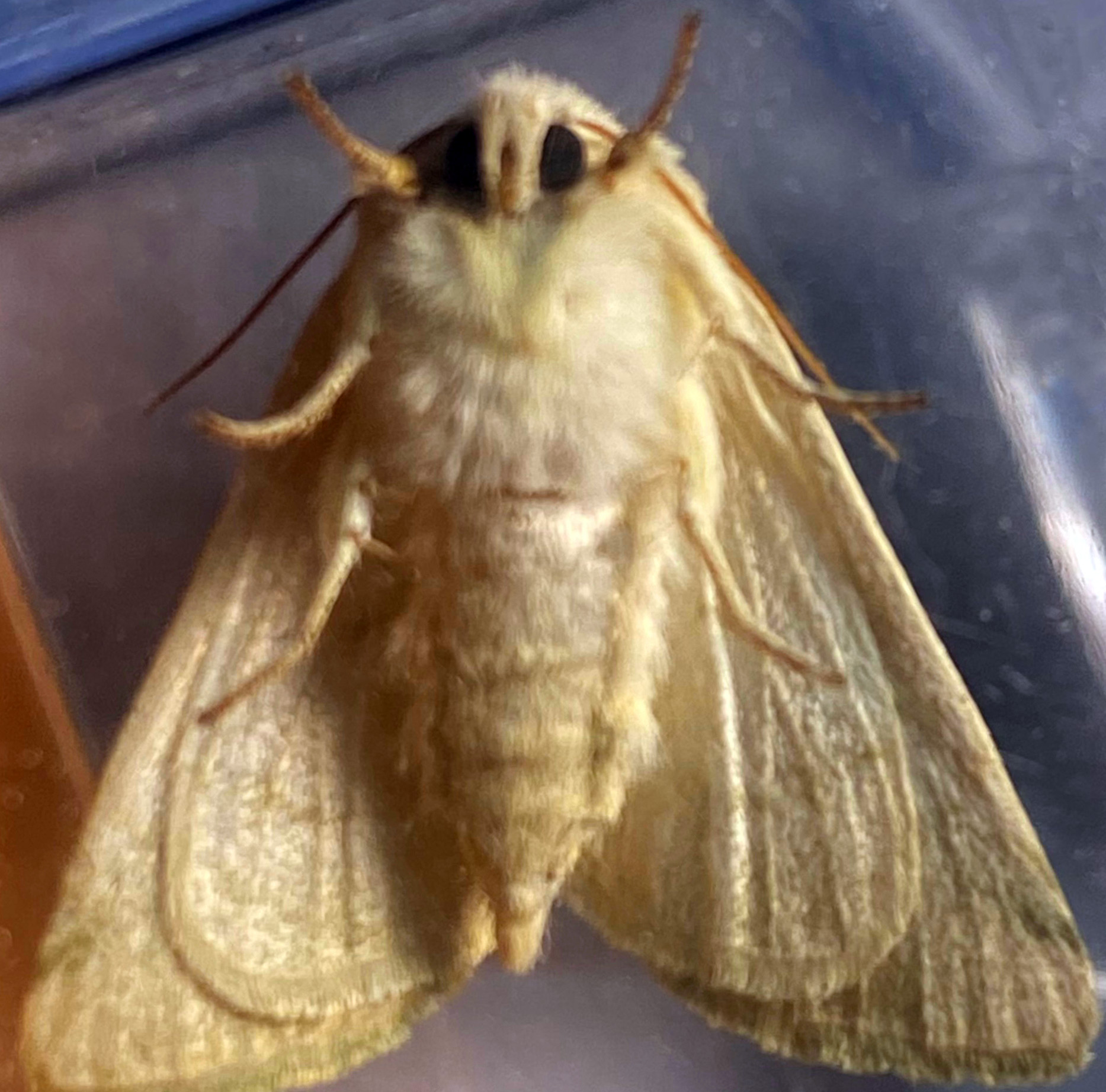
Zotheca tranquilla viewed from below
