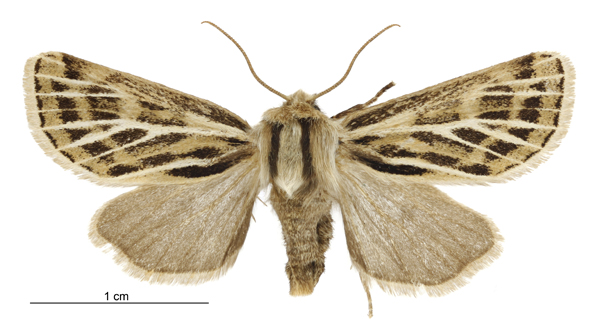
- Female
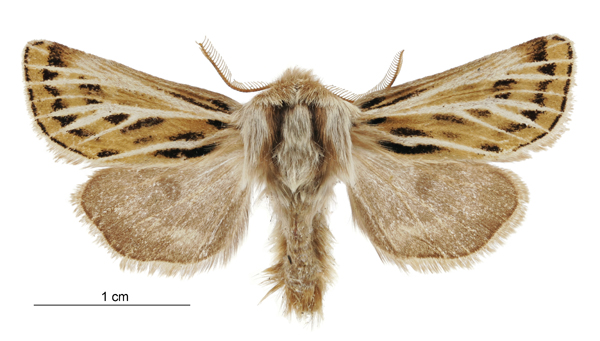
- Male

Scientific classification
- Kingdom: Animalia
- Phylum: Arthropoda
- Class: Insecta
- Order: Lepidoptera
- Superfamily: Noctuoidea
- Family: Noctuidae
- Genus: Nivetica
- Species: N. nervosa

Binomial name
- Nivetica nervosa (Hudson, 1922)

Synonyms
- Ichneutica nervosa Hudson, 1922

= Nivetica nervosa =

Species of moth endemic to New Zealand

Nivetica nervosa is a moth of the family Noctuidae, the sole species of the genus Nivetica. It is only found in New Zealand. This species can be found in wetland habitat in the alpine zone of the South Island. It is a small, distinctively patterned moth that is attracted to light. Currently much of its biology and life cycle is unknown. Adults are on the wing in January and February.

== Taxonomy ==
This species was first described by George Vernon Hudson in 1922 from a specimen collected on Bold Peak, Lake Wakatipu by F. S. Oliver on the night of December 1910. Hudson originally named the species Icheutica nervosa. Hudson discussed and illustrated this species under that same name in his 1928 publication The butterflies and moths of New Zealand. In 1988 John S. Dugdale also discussed this species under the name Ichneutica nervosa. However in 2019 Robert J. B. Hoare published a paper in which he undertook a major review of New Zealand noctuids. Hoare, having inspected specimens of this species, placed it within the newly described genus Nivetica. As at 2019, the location of the male holotype is unknown.

== Description ==
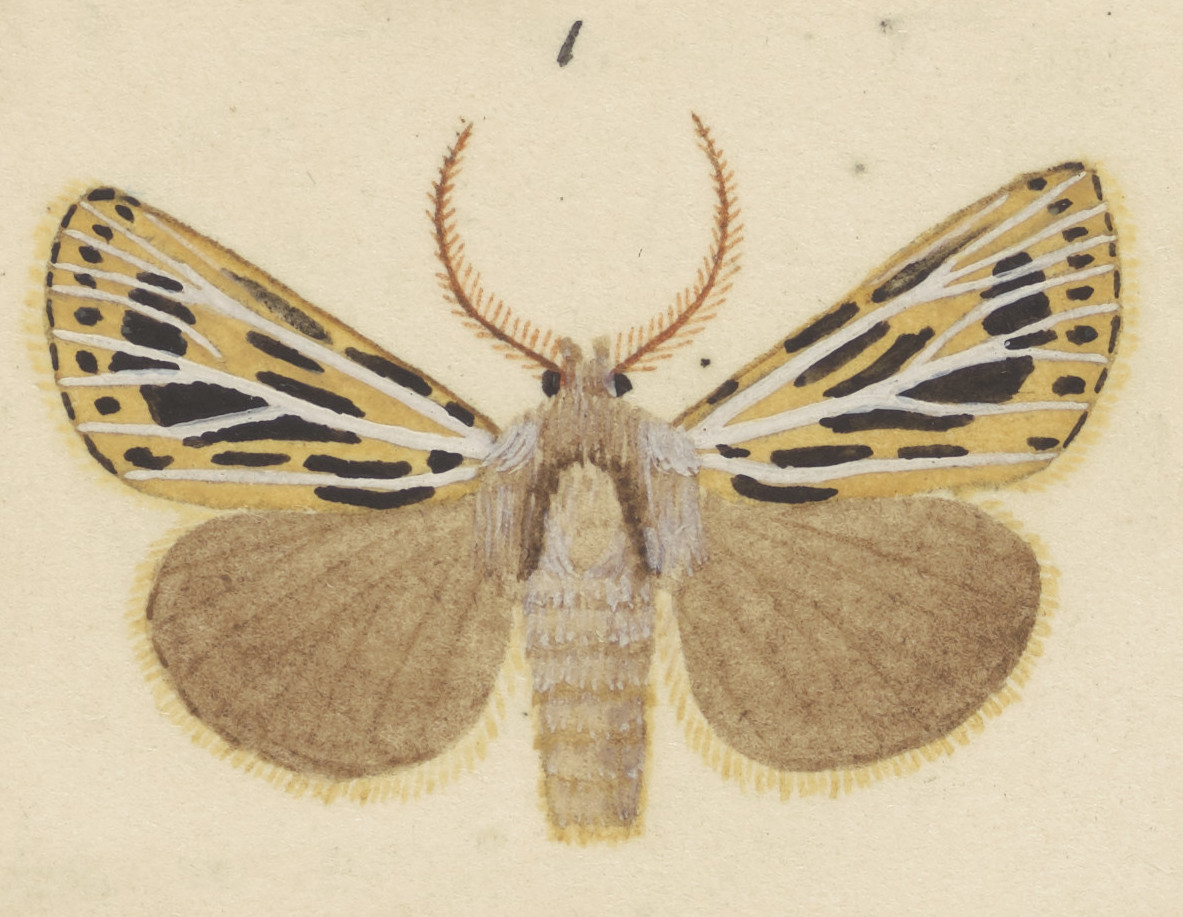
Illustration of Nivetica nervosa by George Hudson.

Hudson originally described the species as follows:

The expansion of the wings of the male is almost 1 1/4 inches. The forewings have the costa almost straight, the apex rather acute and the termen obliquely rounded; bright ochreous with the veins heavily marked in clear white and with black markings between the veins; a small black spot at the base; an elongate blotch between vein 1 and the dorsum; two elongate marks between veins 1 and 2; wedge shaped marks at the origins of veins 2, 3, 4, and 5; a large blotch between veins 5 and 6; a much smaller blotch between veins 6 and 7; two obscure elongate marks in disc immediately below middle of costa and two obscure blackish lines between the costal and subcostal veins; a curved series of subterminal spots and a series of elongate terminal marks. The hind-wings are greyish-brown. The cilia of all the wings are whitish-ochreous. The head is pale brownish-ochreous. The thorax is densely clothed with brownish-ochreous hair with a brown horseshoe-like mark in the middle. The abdomen is pale ochreous. The antennae, which are heavily bipectinated throughout, are reddish-ochreoiis.

The adult male moth has a wingspan of 28—32mm while the female's wingspan is slightly larger at 35mm.

== Geographic range ==
Nivetica nervosa is endemic to New Zealand and the species is widespread in the alpine zone of the South Island.

== Habitat ==
This species prefers alpine wetland habitat.

== Host species ==
The host species of this moth are unknown.

== Life history ==
Little is known of the life history of this species of moth however the adults of N. nervosa are on the wing in December and January.
