= Manga (moth) =

Scientific classification
- Domain: Eukaryota
- Kingdom: Animalia
- Phylum: Arthropoda
- Class: Insecta
- Order: Lepidoptera
- Superfamily: Noctuoidea
- Family: Noctuidae
- Genus: Manga; Bowden, 1956

Genus of moths

Manga is a genus of moths of the family Noctuidae described by J. Bowden in 1956.

== Species ==
- Manga basilinea Bowden, 1956
- Manga belophora D. S. Fletcher, 1961
- Manga bisignata Laporte, 1973
- Manga melanodonta (Hampson, 1910)
