= Xenophysa =

Scientific classification
- Kingdom: Animalia
- Phylum: Arthropoda
- Class: Insecta
- Order: Lepidoptera
- Superfamily: Noctuoidea
- Family: Noctuidae
- Subfamily: Noctuinae
- Genus: Xenophysa; Varga, 2011

Subgenus
- Paraxenophysa

Genus of moths

Xenophysa is a genus of moths of the family Noctuidae. It currently comprises 12 species and is considered to possess a subgenus, Paraxenophysa.
