= Hyperepia =

Scientific classification
- Kingdom: Animalia
- Phylum: Arthropoda
- Clade: Pancrustacea
- Class: Insecta
- Order: Lepidoptera
- Superfamily: Noctuoidea
- Family: Noctuidae
- Genus: Hyperepia; Barnes & Lindsey, 1922
- Species: H. jugifera

Binomial name
- Hyperepia jugifera (Dyar, 1920)

Synonyms
- Hyperepia pi Barnes & Lindsey, 1922

Genus of moths

Hyperepia is a monotypic genus of moths in the family Noctuidae. It was erected by William Barnes and Arthur Ward Lindsey in 1922. Its only species, Hyperepia jugifera, was first described by Harrison Gray Dyar Jr. in 1920. It is found in North America.
