= Carelis =

Scientific classification
- Domain: Eukaryota
- Kingdom: Animalia
- Phylum: Arthropoda
- Class: Insecta
- Order: Lepidoptera
- Superfamily: Noctuoidea
- Family: Noctuidae
- Genus: Carelis; Bowden, 1956

Genus of moths

Carelis is a genus of moths of the family Noctuidae.

== Species ==
- Carelis albula Bowden, 1956
- Carelis ochrivirga (Prout, 1927)
