= Satrapodes =

Scientific classification
- Kingdom: Animalia
- Phylum: Arthropoda
- Clade: Pancrustacea
- Class: Insecta
- Order: Lepidoptera
- Superfamily: Noctuoidea
- Family: Noctuidae
- Genus: Satrapodes; Hampson (1908)

Genus of moths

Satrapodes is a genus of moths of the family Noctuidae. The genus was erected by George Hampson in 1908.

== Species ==
- Satrapodes dosca Schaus, 1912
- Satrapodes mina (Schaus, 1894)
