= Franclemontia =

Scientific classification
- Domain: Eukaryota
- Kingdom: Animalia
- Phylum: Arthropoda
- Class: Insecta
- Order: Lepidoptera
- Superfamily: Noctuoidea
- Family: Noctuidae
- Subfamily: Xyleninae
- Genus: Franclemontia; Ferguson, 1992

Genus of moths

Franclemontia is a genus of moths of the family Noctuidae.

== Species ==
- Franclemontia interrogans (Walker, 1856)
