= Syrrusoides =

Scientific classification
- Domain: Eukaryota
- Kingdom: Animalia
- Phylum: Arthropoda
- Class: Insecta
- Order: Lepidoptera
- Superfamily: Noctuoidea
- Family: Noctuidae
- Genus: Syrrusoides; Laporte, 1972

Genus of moths

Syrrusoides is a genus of moths of the family Noctuidae in Madagascar.

== Species ==
- Syrrusoides lecordieri Laporte, 1972
- Syrrusoides viettei Laporte, 1972
