= Trichofeltia =

Scientific classification
- Domain: Eukaryota
- Kingdom: Animalia
- Phylum: Arthropoda
- Class: Insecta
- Order: Lepidoptera
- Superfamily: Noctuoidea
- Family: Noctuidae
- Genus: Trichofeltia; McDunnough, 1929

Genus of moths

Trichofeltia is a genus of moths of the family Noctuidae.

== Species ==
- Trichofeltia circumdata (Grote, 1883)
