= Xenapamea =

Scientific classification
- Kingdom: Animalia
- Phylum: Arthropoda
- Clade: Pancrustacea
- Class: Insecta
- Order: Lepidoptera
- Superfamily: Noctuoidea
- Family: Noctuidae
- Genus: Xenapamea; Sugi, 1970

Genus of moths

Xenapamea is a genus of moths of the family Noctuidae.

== Species ==
- Xenapamea pacifica Sugi, 1970
