= Plusiophaes =

Scientific classification
- Kingdom: Animalia
- Phylum: Arthropoda
- Clade: Pancrustacea
- Class: Insecta
- Order: Lepidoptera
- Superfamily: Noctuoidea
- Family: Noctuidae
- Genus: Plusiophaes

Genus of moths

Plusiophaes is a genus of moths of the family Noctuidae. Species of this genus are found in Africa.
