= Lophoceramica =

Scientific classification
- Kingdom: Animalia
- Phylum: Arthropoda
- Class: Insecta
- Order: Lepidoptera
- Superfamily: Noctuoidea
- Family: Noctuidae
- Genus: Lophoceramica; Dyar, 1908

Genus of moths

Lophoceramica is a genus of moths of the family Noctuidae.

== Species ==
- Lophoceramica artega (Barnes, 1907)
- Lophoceramica pyrrha (Druce, 1894)
- Lophoceramica simplicifacta Dyar, 1918
