= Rotoa =

Scientific classification
- Kingdom: Animalia
- Phylum: Arthropoda
- Clade: Pancrustacea
- Class: Insecta
- Order: Lepidoptera
- Superfamily: Noctuoidea
- Family: Noctuidae
- Genus: Rotoa; Strand, 1942

Genus of moths

Rotoa is a genus of moths of the family Noctuidae.

== Species ==
- Rotoa distincta (Bang-Haas, 1912)
