= Orohadena =

Scientific classification
- Domain: Eukaryota
- Kingdom: Animalia
- Phylum: Arthropoda
- Class: Insecta
- Order: Lepidoptera
- Superfamily: Noctuoidea
- Family: Noctuidae
- Subfamily: Xyleninae
- Genus: Orohadena; Ronkay, Varga & Gyulai, 1995

Genus of moths

Orohadena is a genus of moths of the family Noctuidae.

== Species ==
- Orohadena cardinalis Ronkay, Varga & Gyulai, 2002
- Orohadena clementissima (Ronkay & Varga, 1993)
- Orohadena nekrasovi Ronkay, Varga & Gyulai, 2002
- Orohadena nobilis (Ronkay & Gyulai, 1997)
- Orohadena presbytis (Hampson, 1910)
- Orohadena xanthophanes (Boursin, 1944)
