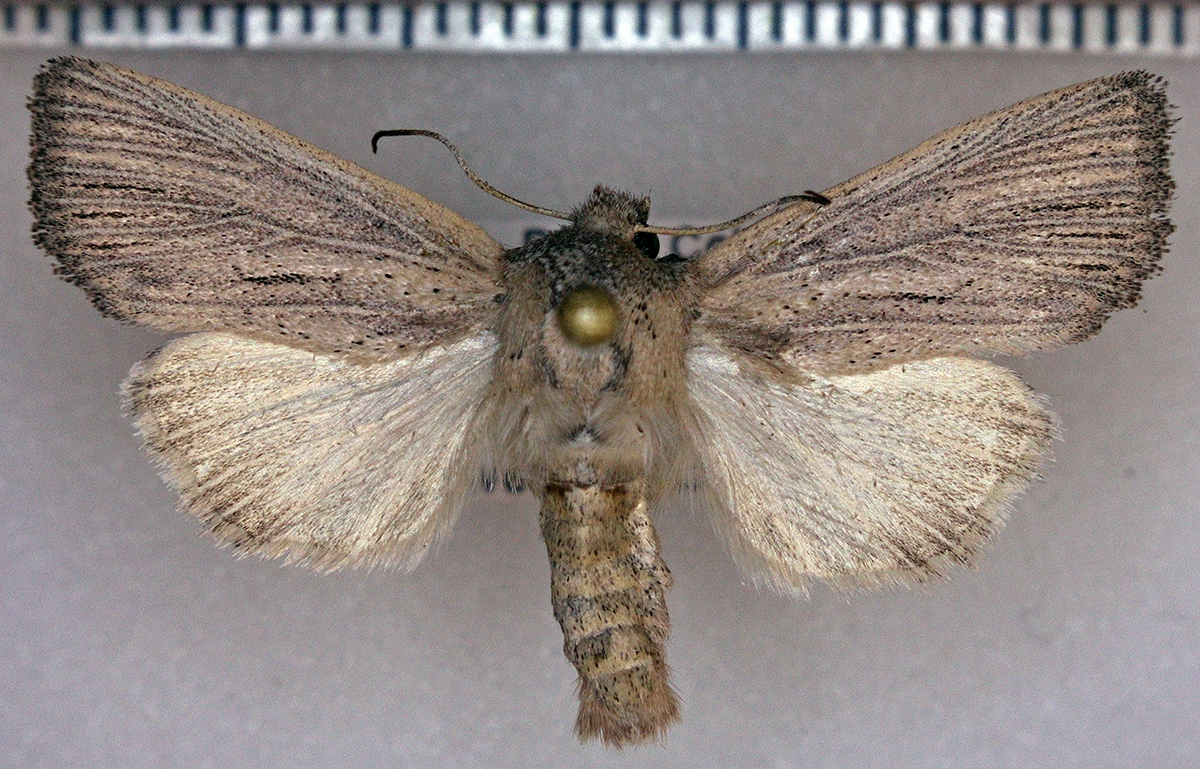

Scientific classification
- Domain: Eukaryota
- Kingdom: Animalia
- Phylum: Arthropoda
- Class: Insecta
- Order: Lepidoptera
- Superfamily: Noctuoidea
- Family: Noctuidae
- Genus: Benjaminiola; Strand, 1928
- Species: B. colorada

Binomial name
- Benjaminiola colorada Smith, 1900

Synonyms
- (Genus): Buchholzia Barnes & Benjamin, 1926; Eubuchholzia Barnes & Benjamin, 1929; (Species): Benjaminiola cirphidia Hampson, 1910; Benjaminiola leucanidia Hampson, 1910

= Benjaminiola =

Benjaminiola colorada

Genus of moths

Benjaminiola is a genus of moths of the family Noctuidae. It is monotypic, being represented by the single species Benjaminiola colorada.
