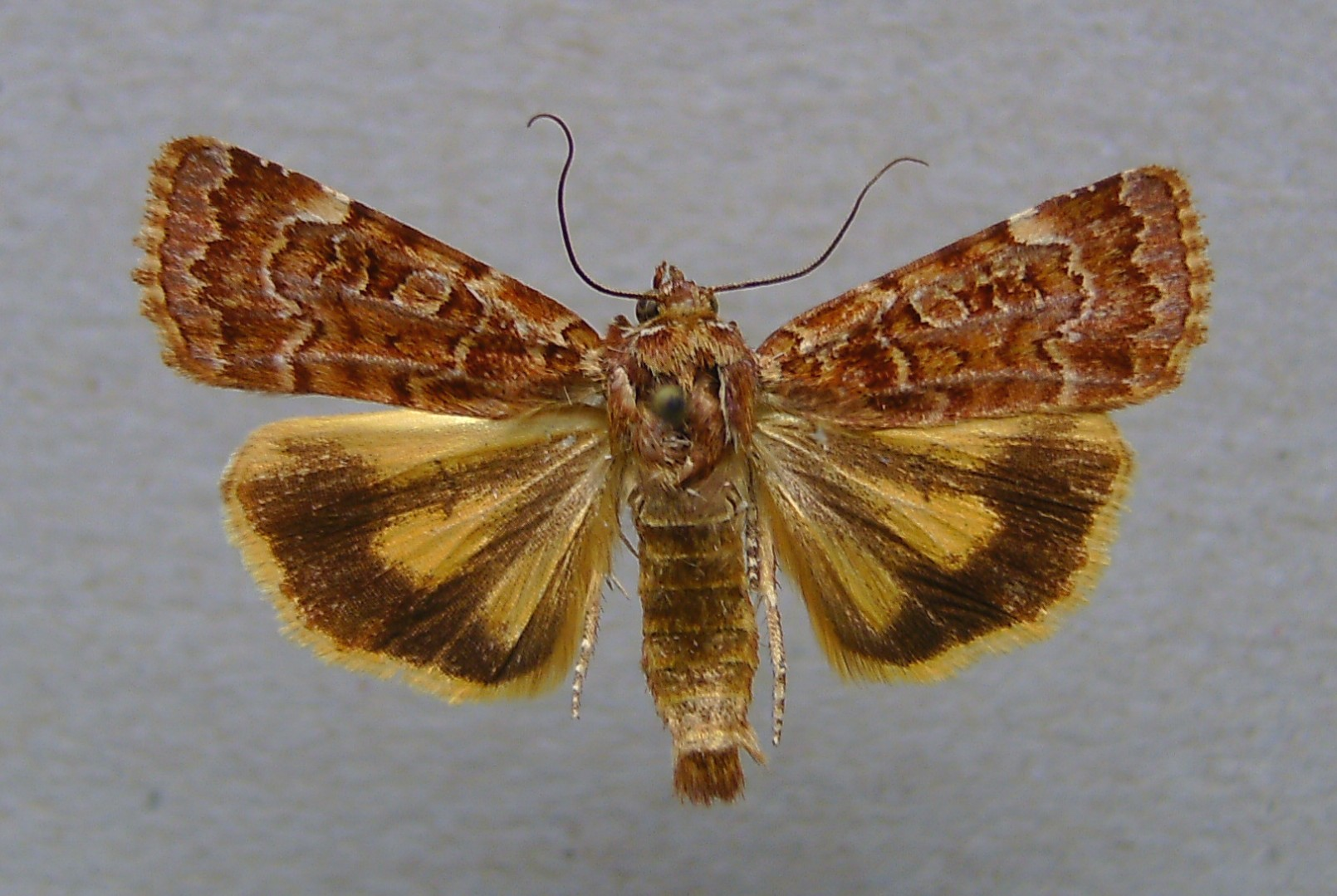
- Divaena haywardi

Scientific classification
- Domain: Eukaryota
- Kingdom: Animalia
- Phylum: Arthropoda
- Class: Insecta
- Order: Lepidoptera
- Superfamily: Noctuoidea
- Family: Noctuidae
- Subfamily: Noctuinae
- Genus: Divaena; Fibiger, 1993

= Divaena =

Genus of moths

Divaena is a genus of moths of the family Noctuidae.

== Species ==
- Divaena haywardi (Tams, 1926)
