= Gyrospilara =

Scientific classification
- Domain: Eukaryota
- Kingdom: Animalia
- Phylum: Arthropoda
- Class: Insecta
- Order: Lepidoptera
- Superfamily: Noctuoidea
- Family: Noctuidae
- Subfamily: Xyleninae
- Genus: Gyrospilara; Kononenko, 1989

Genus of moths

Gyrospilara is a genus of moths of the family Noctuidae.

== Species ==
- Gyrospilara formosa (Graeser, 1888)
