= Pastona =

Scientific classification
- Kingdom: Animalia
- Phylum: Arthropoda
- Class: Insecta
- Order: Lepidoptera
- Superfamily: Noctuoidea
- Family: Noctuidae
- Genus: Pastona; Walker, 1858

Genus of moths

Pastona is a genus of moths of the family Noctuidae.

== Species ==
- Pastona camptosema (Hampson, 1918)
- Pastona glycera (Druce, 1889)
- Pastona goniophora (Schaus, 1903)
- Pastona leucosema (Hampson, 1918)
- Pastona nigropuncta (Druce, 1898)
- Pastona pusilla (Schaus, 1894)
- Pastona rudis Walker, 1858
