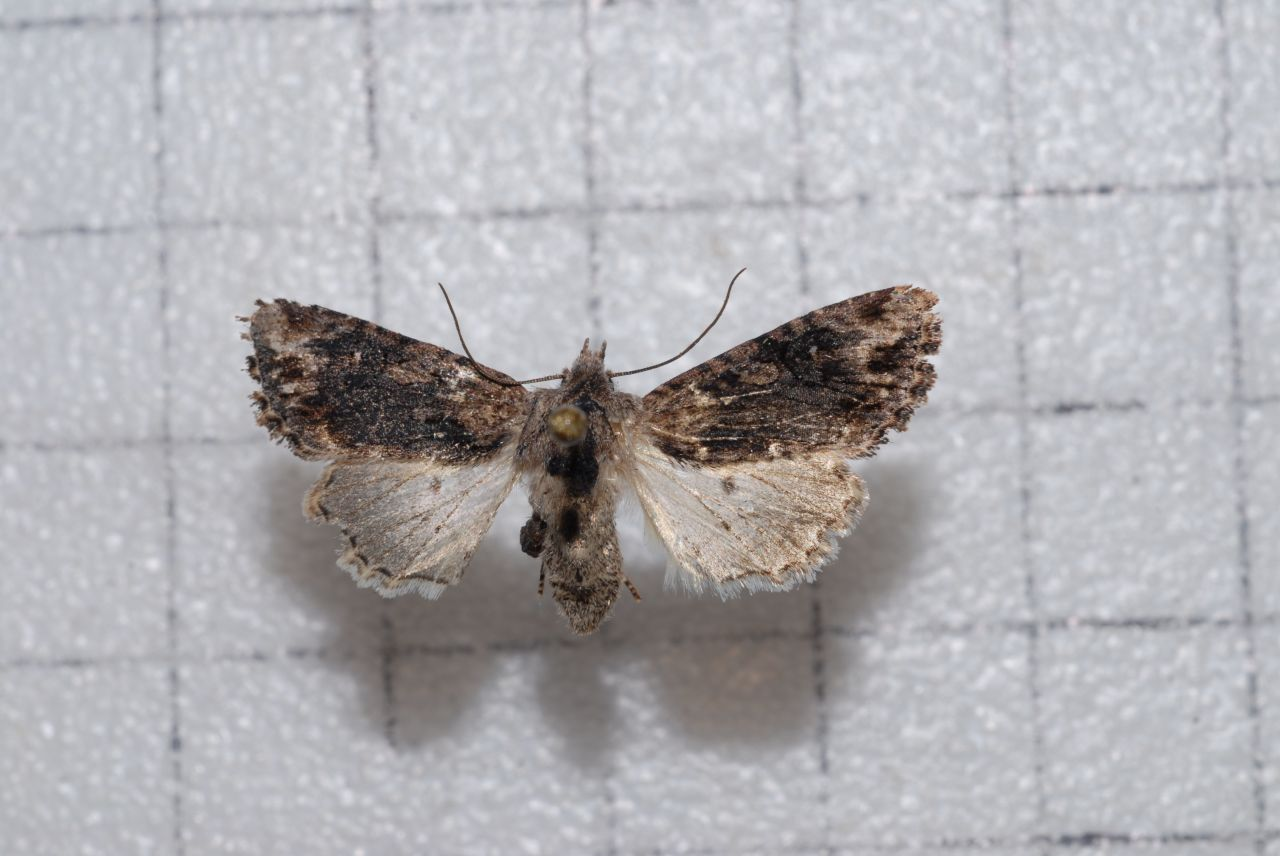

Scientific classification
- Kingdom: Animalia
- Phylum: Arthropoda
- Clade: Pancrustacea
- Class: Insecta
- Order: Lepidoptera
- Superfamily: Noctuoidea
- Family: Noctuidae
- Genus: Lithopolia; Yoshimoto, 1993
- Species: L. confusa

Binomial name
- Lithopolia confusa (Wileman, 1915)

Synonyms
- Xylomannia confusa Wileman, 1915

= Lithopolia =

Genus of moths

Lithopolia is a moth genus in the family Noctuidae. It contains only one species, Lithopolia confusa, which is found in Taiwan.
