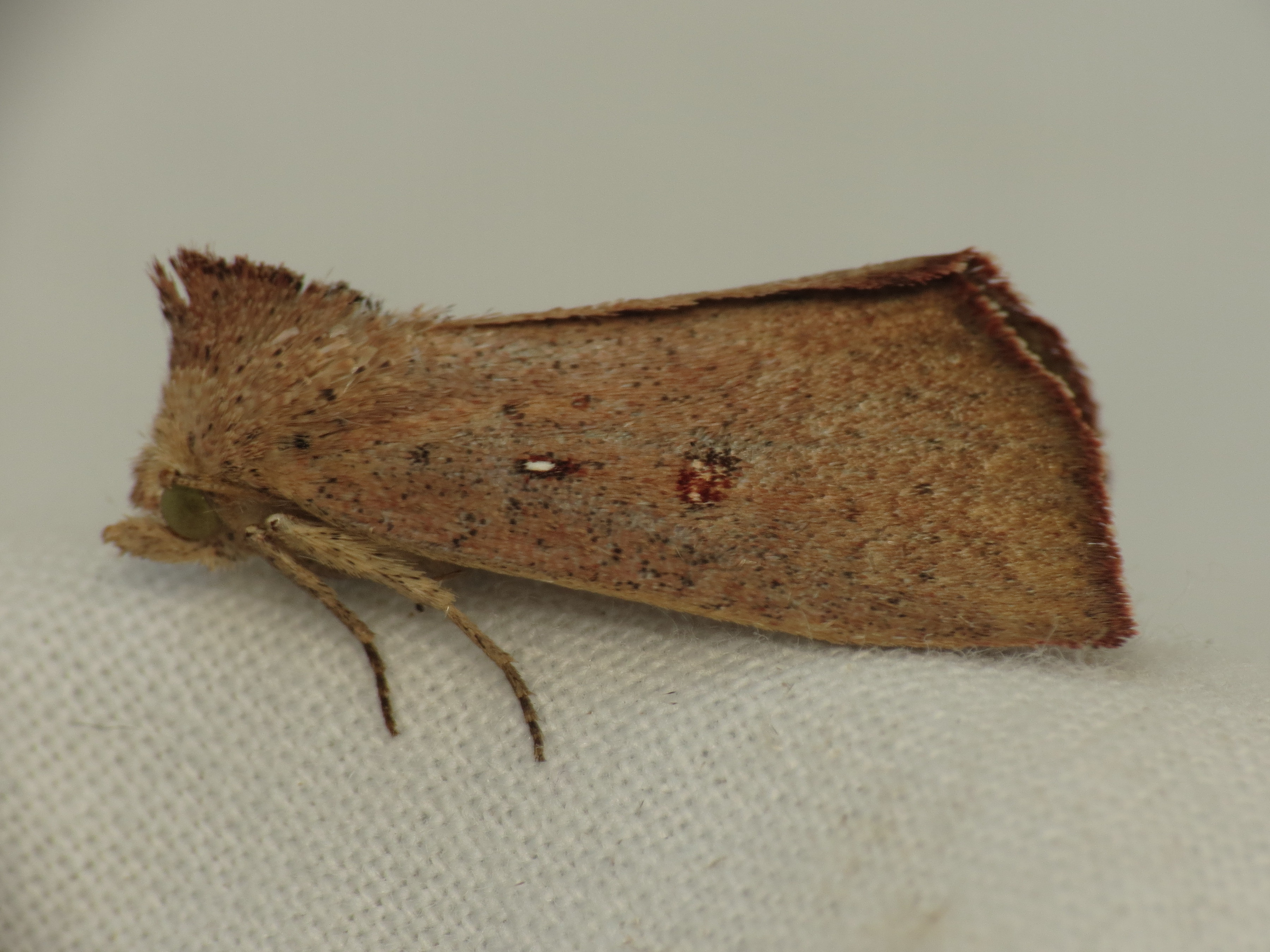
- Lophocalama sp.

Scientific classification
- Kingdom: Animalia
- Phylum: Arthropoda
- Class: Insecta
- Order: Lepidoptera
- Superfamily: Noctuoidea
- Family: Noctuidae
- Genus: Lophocalama; Hampson, 1908

= Lophocalama =

Genus of moths

Lophocalama is a genus of moths of the family Noctuidae.

== Species ==
- Lophocalama neuritis Hampson, 1910
- Lophocalama suffusa (Lucas, 1894)
