= Diadochia =

Scientific classification
- Kingdom: Animalia
- Phylum: Arthropoda
- Class: Insecta
- Order: Lepidoptera
- Superfamily: Noctuoidea
- Family: Noctuidae
- Genus: Diadochia; Püngeler, 1914

Genus of moths

Diadochia is a genus of moths of the family Noctuidae.

== Species ==
- Diadochia saca Püngeler, 1914
