= Rhiza =

Scientific classification
- Domain: Eukaryota
- Kingdom: Animalia
- Phylum: Arthropoda
- Class: Insecta
- Order: Lepidoptera
- Superfamily: Noctuoidea
- Family: Noctuidae
- Subfamily: Hadeninae
- Genus: Rhiza; Staudinger, 1889

Synonyms
- Dysgraphhadena Ronkay, Varga & Fabian, 1995

Genus of moths

Rhiza (from ῥίζα 'root') is a genus of moths of the family Noctuidae. The genus was described by Staudinger in 1889.

== Species ==
Subgenus Rhiza

- Rhiza sergia (Püngeler, 1901) western Turkestan, Mongolia
- Rhiza commoda Staudinger, 1889 Armenia, Turkestan, Mongolia
- Rhiza idumaea (Püngeler, 1901) Palestine
- Rhiza schlumbergeri (Püngeler, 1905) Turkestan
- Rhiza stenoptera (Boursin, 1970)

Subgenus Gryphadena Kusnezov, 1908

- Rhiza indigna (Christoph, 1887) Turkey
- Rhiza minuta (Püngeler, 1900) southern Urals, western Kazakhstan, Turkmenistan, Afghanistan

Subgenus Graphantha Ronkay, Varga & Fábián, 1995

- laciniosa species group
  - Rhiza laciniosa (Christoph, 1887) Turkey, Turkestan, Mongolia
  - Rhiza calligrapha (Ronkay & Varga, 1989)
- gnorima species group
  - Rhiza gnorima (Püngeler, 1906)
