= Pseudluperina =

Scientific classification
- Domain: Eukaryota
- Kingdom: Animalia
- Phylum: Arthropoda
- Class: Insecta
- Order: Lepidoptera
- Superfamily: Noctuoidea
- Family: Noctuidae
- Subfamily: Xyleninae
- Genus: Pseudluperina; Beck, 1999

Genus of moths

Pseudluperina is a genus of moths of the family Noctuidae.

== Species ==
- Pseudluperina pozzii (Curò, 1883)
