= Hemibryomima =

- Hemibryomima chryselectra

Scientific classification
- Domain: Eukaryota
- Kingdom: Animalia
- Phylum: Arthropoda
- Class: Insecta
- Order: Lepidoptera
- Superfamily: Noctuoidea
- Family: Noctuidae
- Genus: Hemibryomima; Barnes & Benjamin, 1927

Genus of moths

Hemibryomima is a genus of moths of the family Noctuidae first described by William Barnes and Foster Hendrickson Benjamin in 1927.

== Species ==
- Hemibryomima chryselectra (Grote, 1880)
- Hemibryomima olivaria (Hampson, 1918)
