= Heterophysa =

Scientific classification
- Domain: Eukaryota
- Kingdom: Animalia
- Phylum: Arthropoda
- Class: Insecta
- Order: Lepidoptera
- Superfamily: Noctuoidea
- Family: Noctuidae
- Genus: Heterophysa; Boursin, 1953

Genus of moths

Heterophysa is a genus of moths of the family Noctuidae.

== Species ==
- Heterophysa dumetorum (Geyer, [1834])
