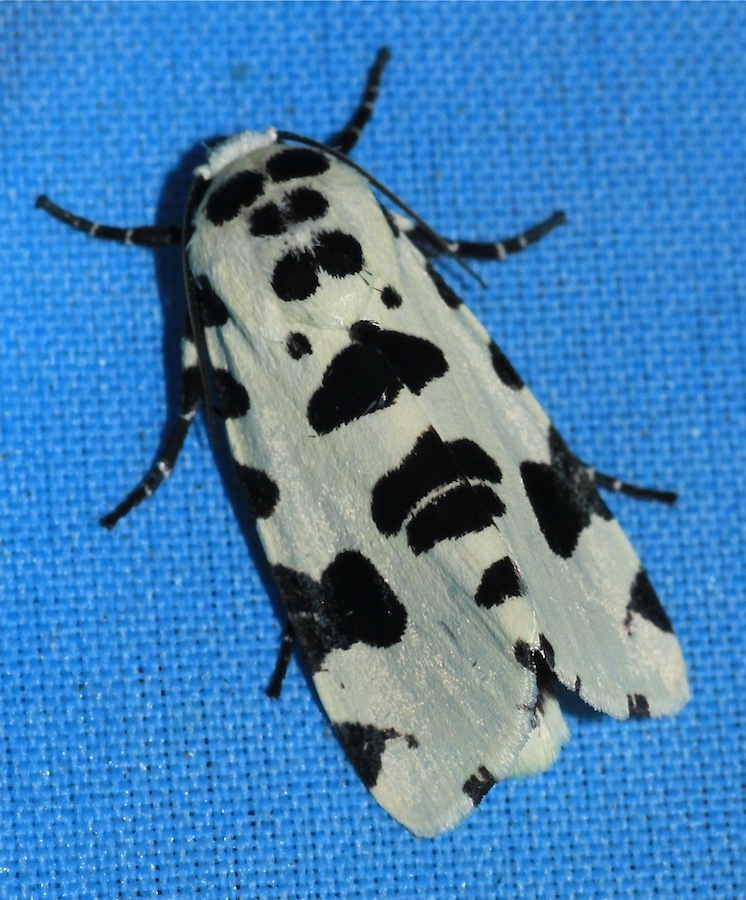
- Clethrorasa pilcheri from Borneo

Scientific classification
- Kingdom: Animalia
- Phylum: Arthropoda
- Class: Insecta
- Order: Lepidoptera
- Superfamily: Noctuoidea
- Family: Noctuidae
- Genus: Clethrorasa; Hampson, 1908

= Clethrorasa =

Genus of moths

Clethrorasa is a genus of moths in the family Noctuidae.

== Species ==
- Clethrorasa micropuncta (Holloway, 1989) — from Borneo and Sumatra.
- Clethrorasa pilcheri (Hampson, 1896) — from North East Himalaya, Peninsular Malaysia, Borneo.

== Characteristics ==
All species of this small genus of oriental noctuid moths are characterized by striking pale cream forewings with a black discal mark and single or paired black marks round the margin. The thorax is similarly marked. The hindwings and abdomen are gray, marginally or apically colored cream of the forewings' ground.
