= Acherdoa =

Scientific classification
- Kingdom: Animalia
- Phylum: Arthropoda
- Class: Insecta
- Order: Lepidoptera
- Superfamily: Noctuoidea
- Family: Noctuidae
- Genus: Acherdoa; Walker, 1865

Genus of moths

Acherdoa is a genus of moths of the family Noctuidae.

== Species ==
- Acherdoa ferraria Walker, 1865
- Acherdoa ornata
