= Stygiodrina =

Scientific classification
- Kingdom: Animalia
- Phylum: Arthropoda
- Class: Insecta
- Order: Lepidoptera
- Superfamily: Noctuoidea
- Family: Noctuidae
- Genus: Stygiodrina; Boursin, 1937

Genus of moths

Stygiodrina is a genus of moths of the family Noctuidae.

== Species ==
- Stygiodrina maurella (Staudinger, 1888)
