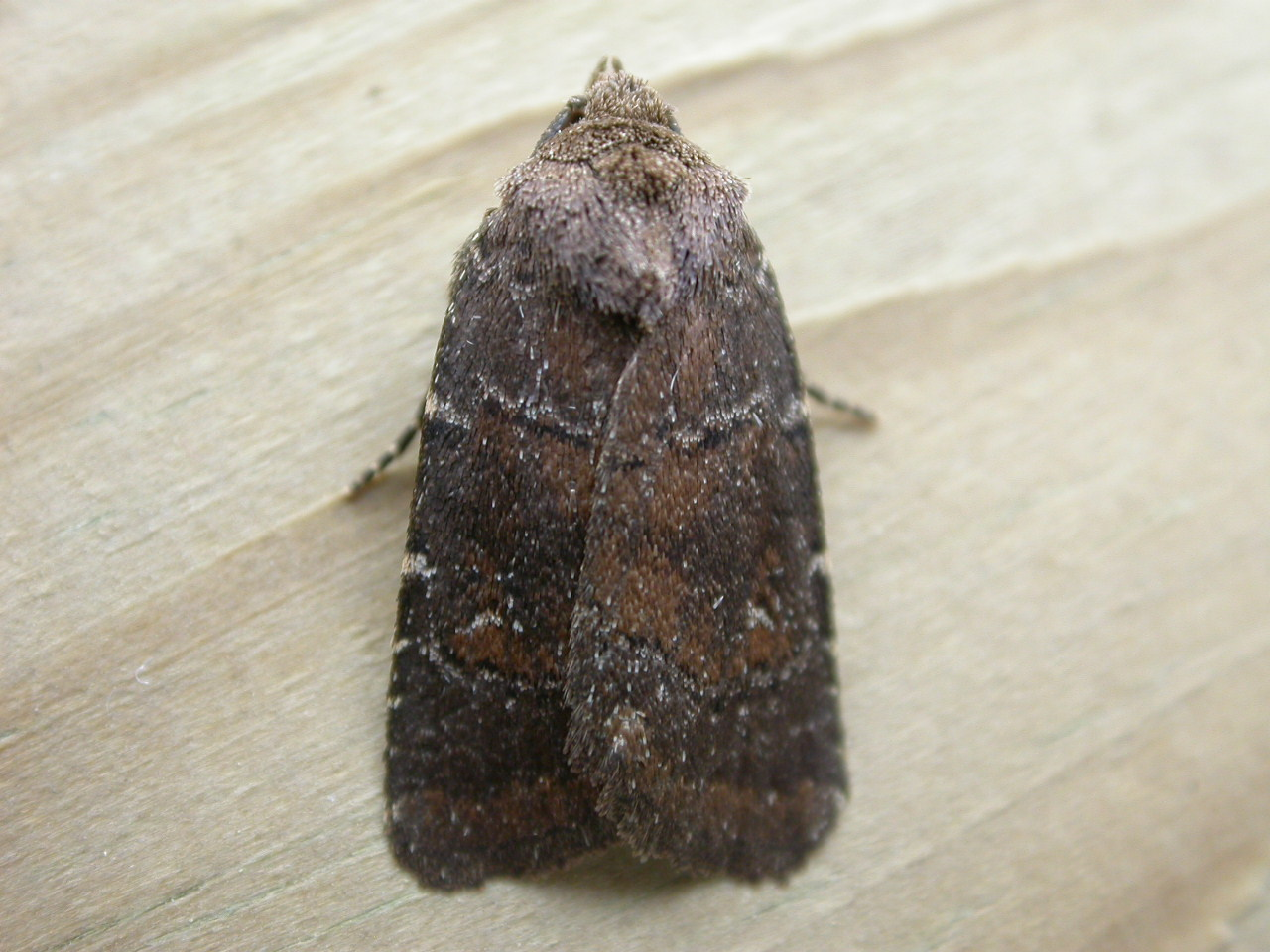

Scientific classification
- Kingdom: Animalia
- Phylum: Arthropoda
- Class: Insecta
- Order: Lepidoptera
- Superfamily: Noctuoidea
- Family: Noctuidae
- Genus: Rusina; Stephens, 1829

Type species
- Bombyx ferruginea Esper, 1785

= Rusina (moth) =

Genus of moths

Rusina is a genus of moths of the family Noctuidae.
