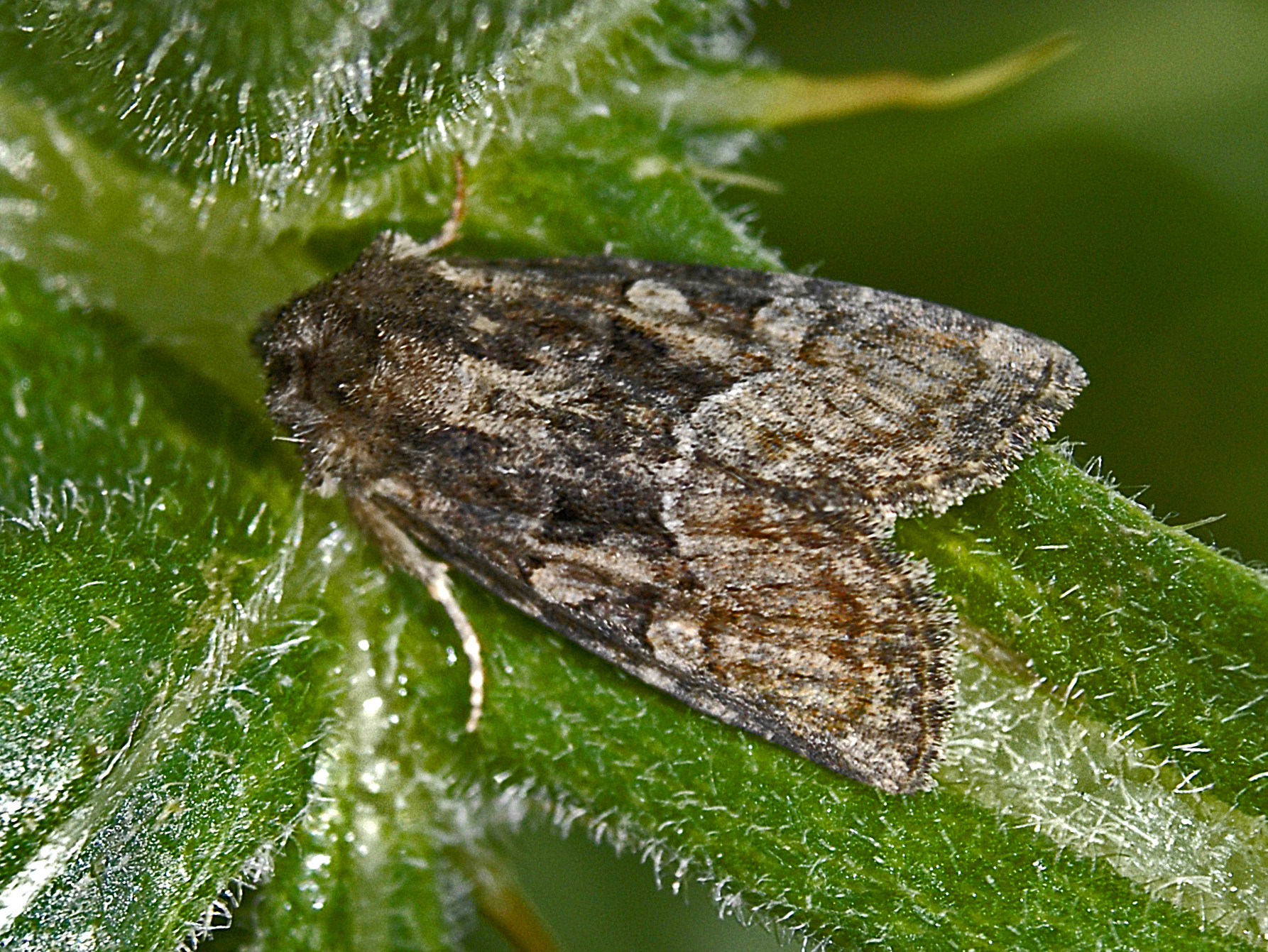
- Oligia dubia

Scientific classification
- Domain: Eukaryota
- Kingdom: Animalia
- Phylum: Arthropoda
- Class: Insecta
- Order: Lepidoptera
- Superfamily: Noctuoidea
- Family: Noctuidae
- Subfamily: Noctuinae
- Tribe: Apameini
- Genus: Oligia; Hübner, [1821]

= Oligia =

Genus of moths

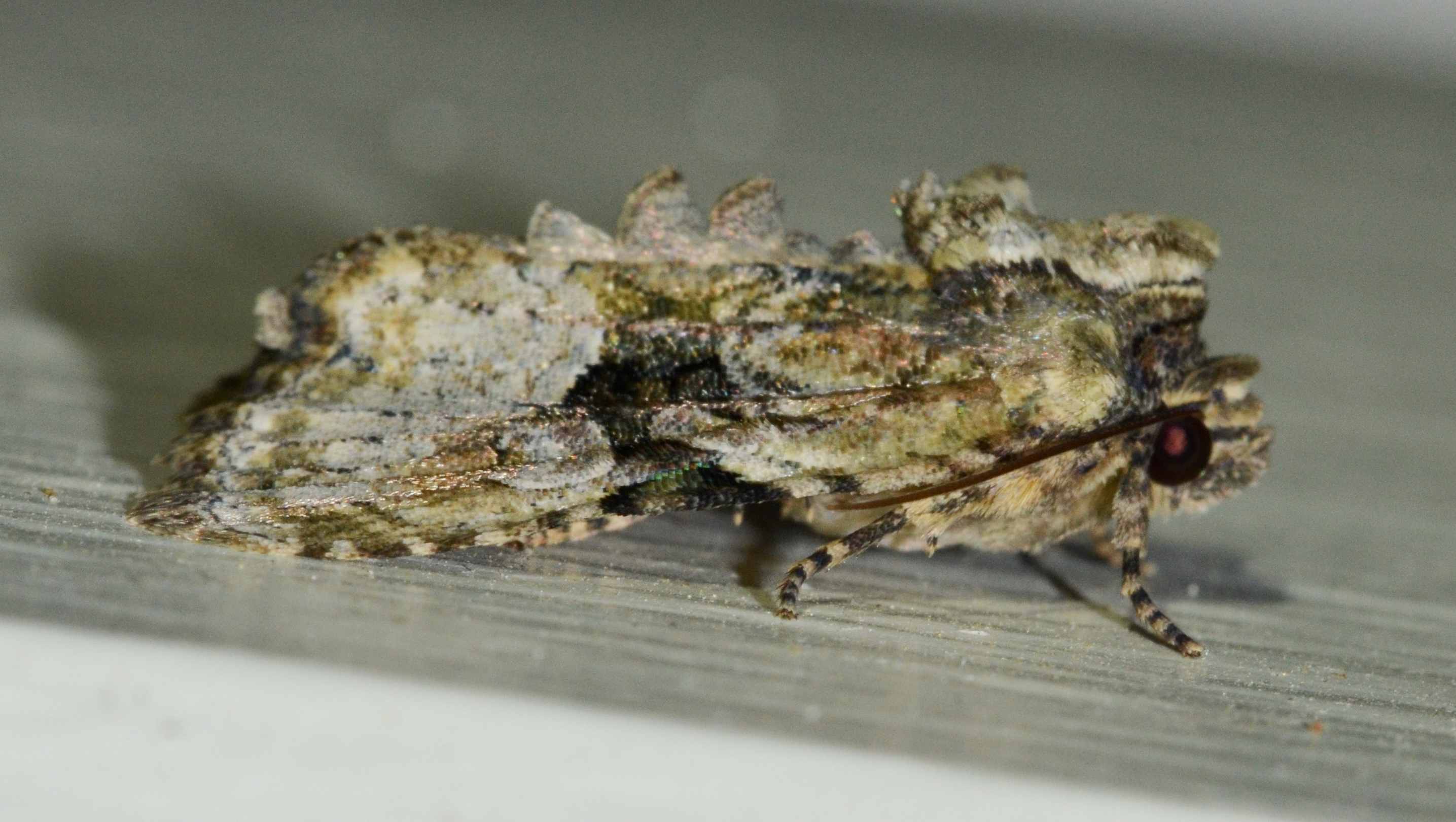
Oligia modica, black-banded brocade

Oligia is a genus in the moth family Noctuidae. There are more than 60 described species in Oligia, found in Europe, the Americas, Africa, and Asia.

== Species ==
These 69 species belong to the genus Oligia:

- Oligia agelasta Fletcher, 1961
- Oligia albilinea Laporte, 1973
- Oligia ambigua Walker, 1858
- Oligia ambiguella Fletcher, 1961
- Oligia anomalata Berio
- Oligia apameoides Draudt, 1950
- Oligia arbaminchensis Laporte, 1991
- Oligia atrivitta Hampson, 1914
- Oligia bridghamii (Grote & Robinson, 1866)
- Oligia bruneonigra Laporte, 1973
- Oligia chlorostigma (Harvey, 1876)
- Oligia confusa Janse, 1940
- Oligia cupricolor Laporte, 1973
- Oligia decinerea Fletcher, 1961
- Oligia dinawa Bethune-Baker, 1906
- Oligia divesta (Grote, 1874)
- Oligia dubia (Heydemann, 1942)
- Oligia egens (Walker, 1857)
- Oligia exsiccata Wallengren, 1860
- Oligia faroulti Rothschild, 1914
- Oligia fasciuncula (Haworth, 1809)
- Oligia flava Laporte, 1973
- Oligia genettae Laporte, 1991
- Oligia grisescens (Heydemann, 1932)
- Oligia h-notata Berio
- Oligia hypothermes Hampson, 1908
- Oligia hypoxantha Hampson, 1914
- Oligia infima Laporte, 1973
- Oligia instructa Walker, 1865
- Oligia intermedia Berio
- Oligia latra Berio
- Oligia latruncula ([Denis & Schiffermüller], 1775)
- Oligia leleupi Berio
- Oligia leuconephra Hampson, 1908
- Oligia longidens Berio
- Oligia mediofasciata Draudt, 1950
- Oligia melanodonta Hampson, 1908
- Oligia minuscula (Morrison, 1875)
- Oligia modica (Guenée, 1852)
- Oligia multiplicata Berio
- Oligia nigrithorax Draudt, 1950
- Oligia niveiplaga Draudt, 1950
- Oligia nyctichroa Jones, D., 1908
- Oligia obsolescens Berio
- Oligia obtusa (Smith, 1902)
- Oligia pachydetis Fletcher, 1961
- Oligia parathermes Bethune-Baker, 1911
- Oligia perpusilla Berio
- Oligia pseudodubia Rezbanyai-Reser, 1997
- Oligia rampartensis Barnes & Benjamin, 1923
- Oligia rufilinea Laporte, 1973
- Oligia rufulonigra Laporte, 1973
- Oligia rufulus Laporte, 1973
- Oligia rufulusoides Laporte, 1973
- Oligia scriptonigra Laporte, 1973
- Oligia scriptonova Berio, 1977
- Oligia semidiaphana Berio
- Oligia sodalis Draudt, 1950
- Oligia stenopterygioides Berio
- Oligia strigilis (Linnaeus, 1758)
- Oligia subambigua Fletcher, 1961
- Oligia suleiman Rezbanyai-Reser, 1997
- Oligia tripunctata Fletcher, 1961
- Oligia turcia Rezbanyai-Reser, 1997
- Oligia tusa (Grote, 1878)
- Oligia vandarban Rezbanyai-Reser, 1997
- Oligia versicolor (Borkhausen, 1792)
- Oligia violacea (Grote, 1881)
- Oligia vulnerata Butler, 1878

== Former species ==
- Oligia arbora is now known as Mesapamea arbora (Barnes & McDunnough, 1912)
- Oligia fractilinea is now known as Mesapamea fractilinea (Grote, 1874)
- Oligia hausta (Grote, 1882) is now a synonym of Neoligia semicana (Walker, 1865)
- Oligia illocata is now known as Fishia illocata (Walker, 1857)
- Oligia indirecta is now known as Xylomoia indirecta (Grote, 1875)
- Oligia laevigata (Smith, 1898) is now a synonym of Neoligia subjuncta (Smith, 1898)
- Oligia mactata is now known as Platypolia mactata (Guenée, 1852)
- Oligia marina is now Aseptis marina (Grote, 1874)
