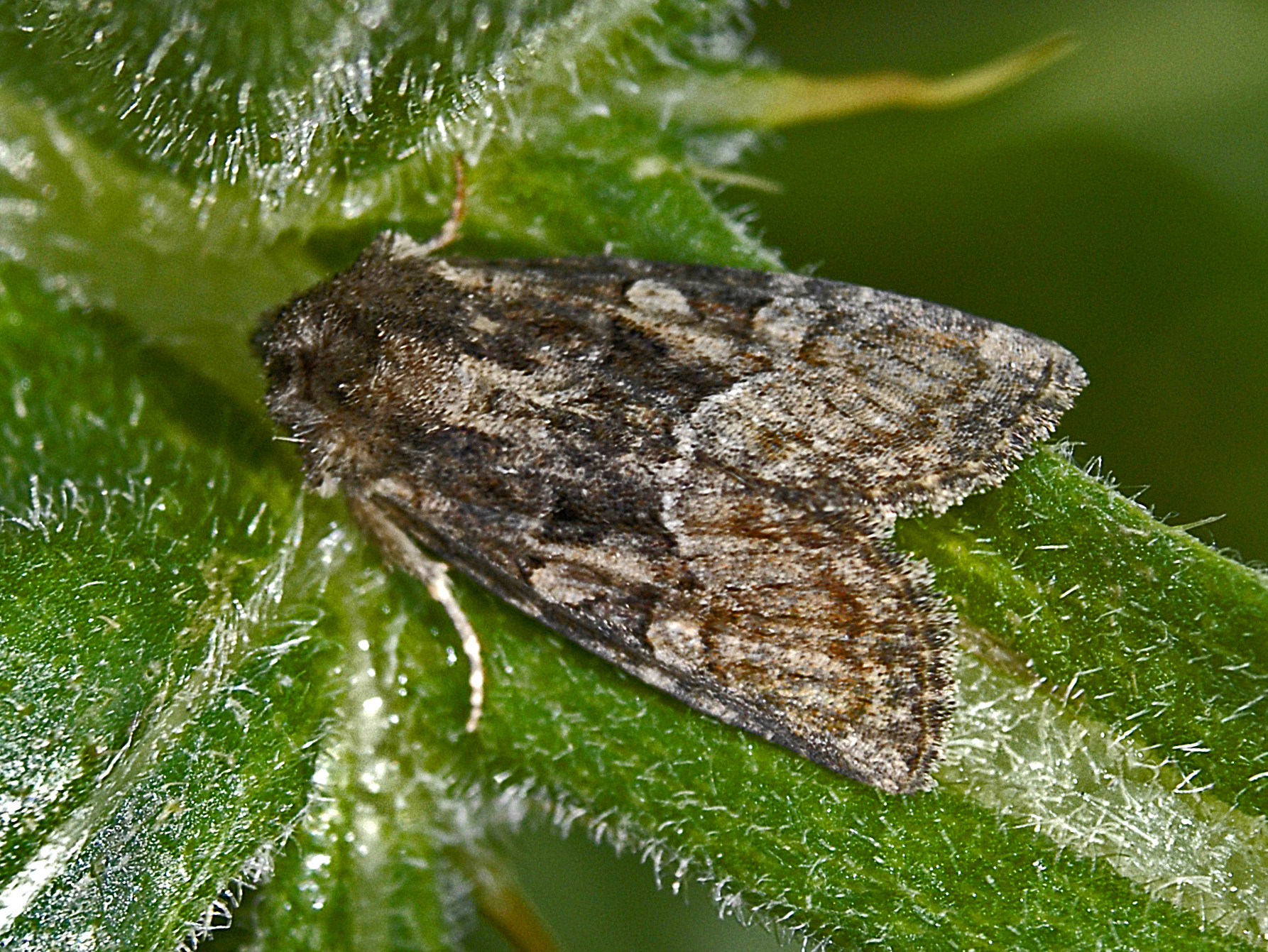
- Oligia cf. dubia

Scientific classification
- Domain: Eukaryota
- Kingdom: Animalia
- Phylum: Arthropoda
- Class: Insecta
- Order: Lepidoptera
- Superfamily: Noctuoidea
- Family: Noctuidae
- Genus: Oligia
- Species: O. dubia

Binomial name
- Oligia dubia (Heydemann, 1942)

Synonyms
- Procus dubia Heydemann, 1942

= Oligia dubia =

Species of moth

Oligia dubia is a species of moth belonging to the family Noctuidae.

== Etymology ==
The name of the species derives from the Latin dubia, meaning doubtful, because of the then uncertain taxonomic status of the species.

== Distribution ==
This rare species is present in Austria, Hungary, Northern Italy, Croatia, Slovakia and Switzerland.

== Habitat ==
These moths live in grasslands surrounded by mixed deciduous forest and in xerothermic rocky escarpment on limestone at an altitude of about 800–900 m.

== Description ==
Oligia dubia has a wingspan of 22–24 mm. These moths have quite variable dark brown forewings, with a clearer marginal area.

This species is similar to Oligia latruncula, Oligia strigilis and Oligia versicolor and specific identification usually requires close study of the genitalia.

== Biology ==
Adults fly from June to August. Caterpillars can be found in grasses until May. This species overwinters as a larva.
