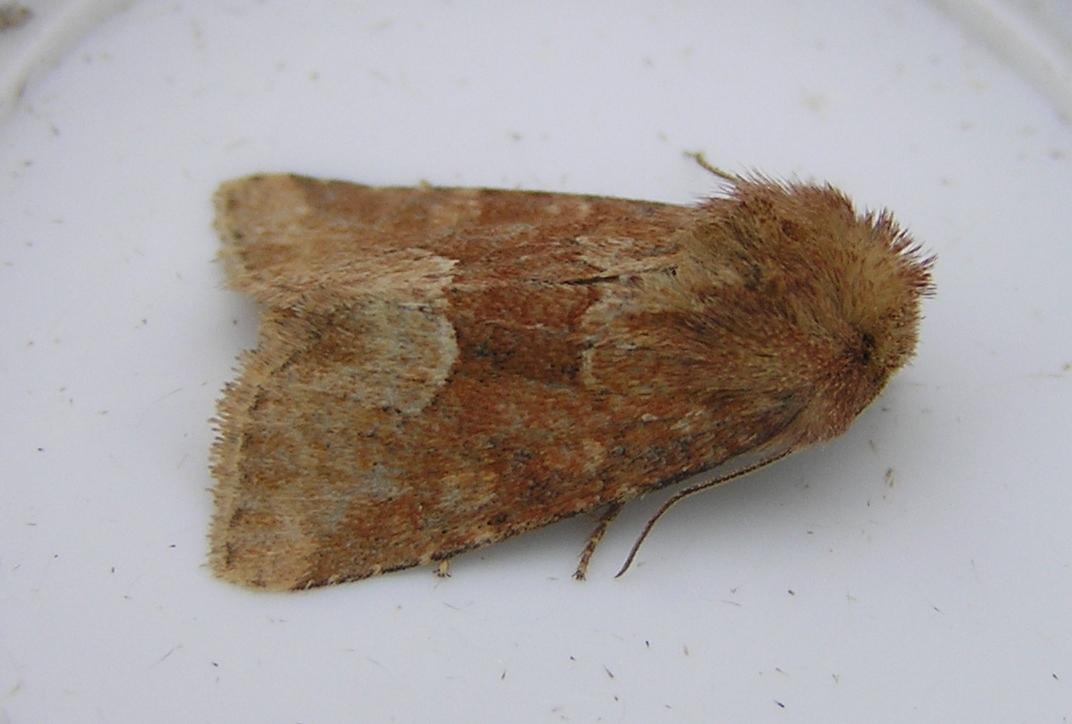

Scientific classification
- Domain: Eukaryota
- Kingdom: Animalia
- Phylum: Arthropoda
- Class: Insecta
- Order: Lepidoptera
- Superfamily: Noctuoidea
- Family: Noctuidae
- Genus: Oligia
- Species: O. fasciuncula

Binomial name
- Oligia fasciuncula (Haworth, 1809)

= Oligia fasciuncula =

Species of moth

Oligia fasciuncula, the middle-barred minor, is a moth of the family Noctuidae. It is found in Europe.

== Technical description and variation ==
Forewing bright rufous, the median and terminal areas deeper; the inner and outer lines white, especially the outer on inner margin; stigmata slightly paler; hindwing blackish fuscous, the fringe whitish; - ab. cana Stgr. is much paler, especially the basal and outer areas, the colouration more olive drab, without any rufous tint;- pallida Tutt is an extreme form of this, with the median area hoary as well as the basal and outer - suffusa Tutt, from Armagh, Northern Ireland, is greyish black, with all markings faint, somewhat resembling aethiops Haw.; a Scotch form, ab. brunneata is browner, especially the lower half of median area.[Oligia fasciuncula is] recorded [1914 ] only from Western Europe, Britain, Denmark, Holland, N. France, and Spain. This much restricted area of distribution affords a strong reason for not considering this species a form of strigilis.

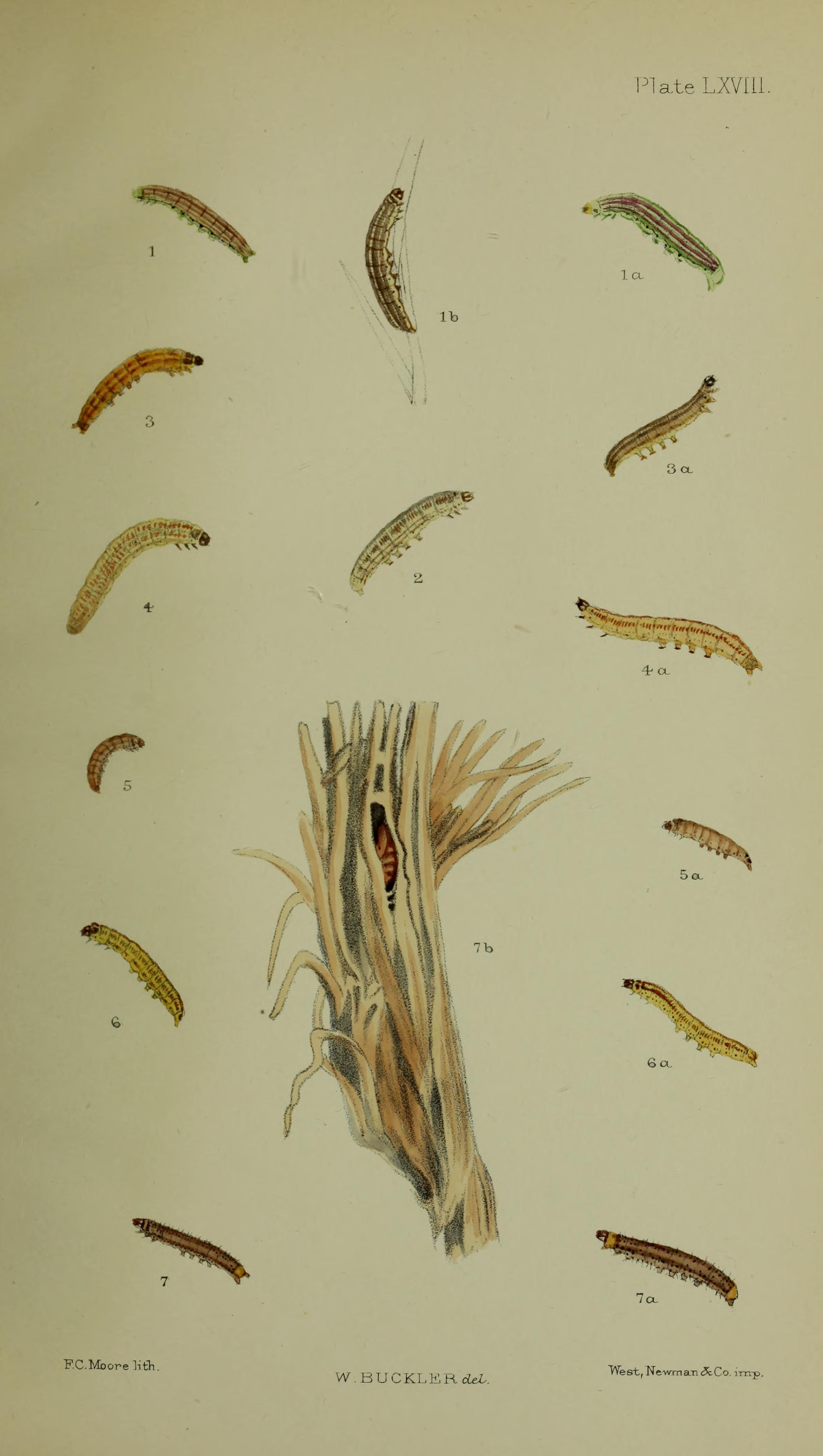
Fig.2 larva after last moult

== Biology ==
The moth flies in one generation from mid-May to late-July..

Larva dull flesh colour; the lines pale greyish ochreous; head and thoracic plate pale brown. The larvae feed in the stems of various grasses, such as tufted hair-grass and Festuca ovina.

== Notes ==
1. The flight season refers to Belgium and The Netherlands. This may vary in other parts of the range.
