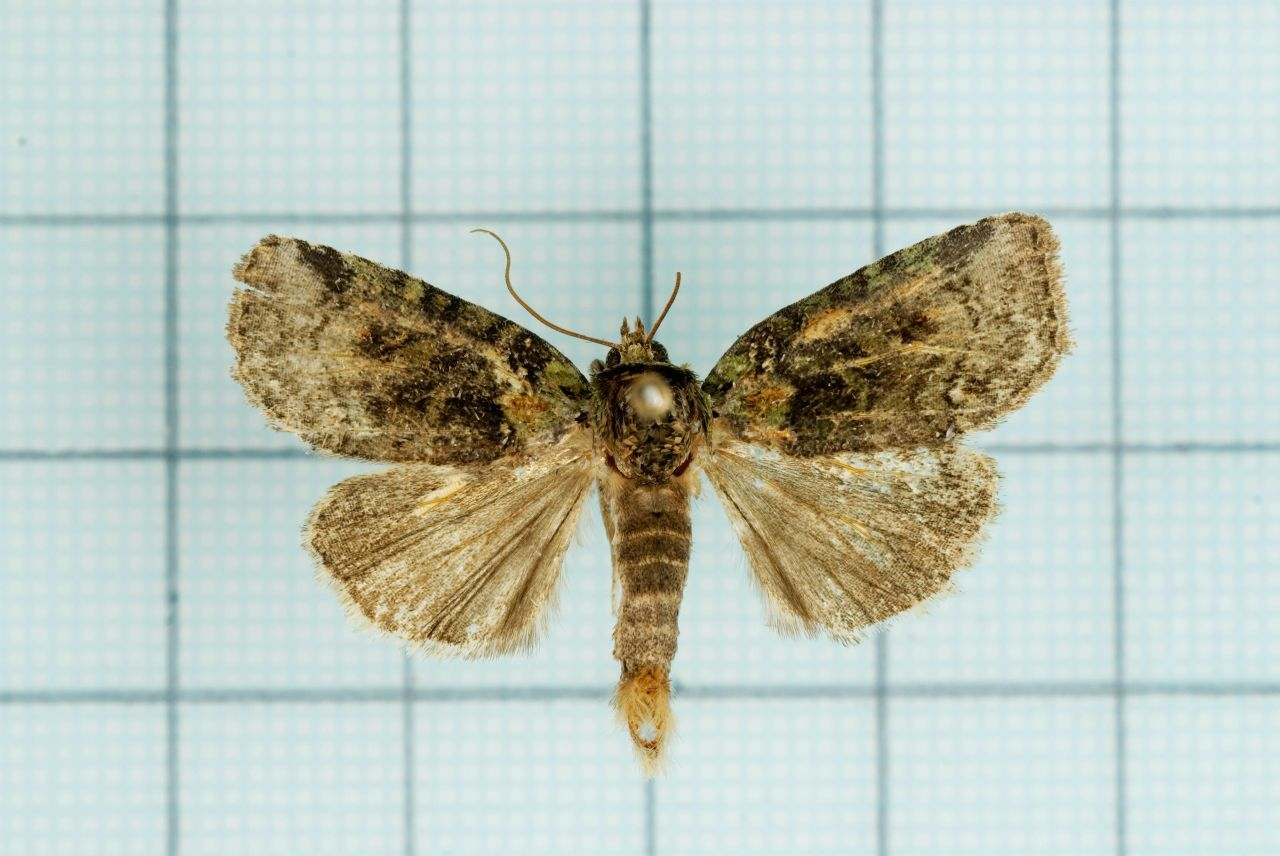
- An unidentified Chytonix species

Scientific classification
- Kingdom: Animalia
- Phylum: Arthropoda
- Class: Insecta
- Order: Lepidoptera
- Superfamily: Noctuoidea
- Family: Noctuidae
- Tribe: Elaphriini
- Genus: Chytonix; Grote, 1874

Synonyms
- Paroligia Warren, 1913

= Chytonix =

Genus of moths

Chytonix is a genus of moths of the family Noctuidae.

== Species ==
- Chytonix albiplaga Hampson, 1914
- Chytonix albonotata Staudinger
- Chytonix costimacula Wileman, 1915
- Chytonix elegans Schaus 1911
- Chytonix hastata (Moore 1882)
- Chytonix palliatricula (Guenée, 1852)
- Chytonix sensilis Grote, 1881 (=Chytonix ruperti Franclemont, 1941)
- Chytonix subalbonotata Sugi
- Chytonix umbrifera (Butler, 1889)
- Chytonix variegata Wileman, 1914
- Chytonix variegatoides Poole, 1989
- Chytonix vermiculata (Snellen, 1880)

== Former species ==
- Chytonix divesta is now Oligia divesta (Grote, 1874)
