= Neoligia canadensis =

Scientific classification
- Domain: Eukaryota
- Kingdom: Animalia
- Phylum: Arthropoda
- Class: Insecta
- Order: Lepidoptera
- Superfamily: Noctuoidea
- Family: Noctuidae
- Tribe: Apameini
- Genus: Neoligia
- Species: N. canadensis

Binomial name
- Neoligia canadensis Troubridge & Lafontaine, 2002

Species of moth

Neoligia canadensis is a species of cutworm or dart moth in the family Noctuidae. It is found in North America.

The MONA or Hodges number for Neoligia canadensis is 9411.1.
