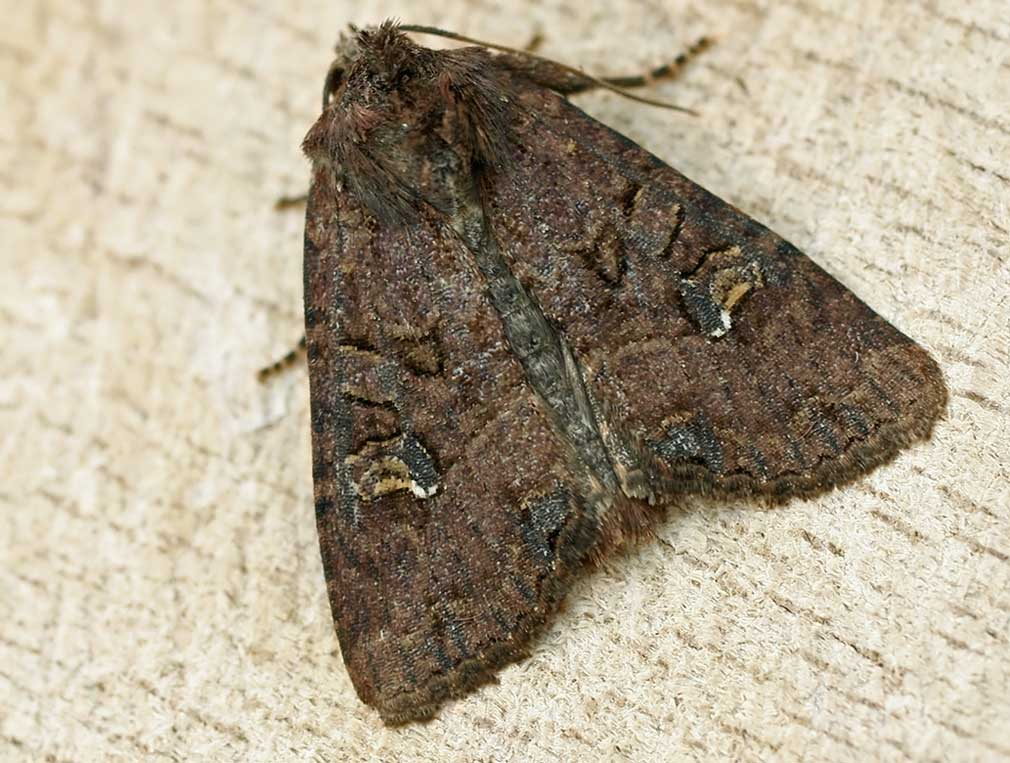

Scientific classification
- Kingdom: Animalia
- Phylum: Arthropoda
- Clade: Pancrustacea
- Class: Insecta
- Order: Lepidoptera
- Superfamily: Noctuoidea
- Family: Noctuidae
- Genus: Mesapamea
- Species: M. secalis

Binomial name
- Mesapamea secalis (Linnaeus, 1758)

Synonyms
- Noctua lamda; Noctua furca; Noctua i-niger; Noctua lugens; Noctua nova; Noctua rava; Noctua secalina; Parastichtis vilis

= Mesapamea secalis =

Species of moth

Mesapamea secalis, the common rustic, is a moth of the family Noctuidae. The species was first described by Carl Linnaeus in his 1758 10th edition of Systema Naturae. It is found in Europe, north-west Africa, Turkey and northern Iran.

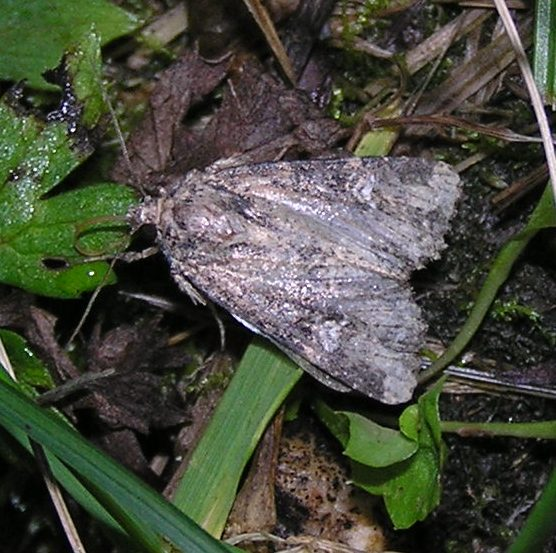

The species was formerly considered the same species as the lesser common rustic (Mesapamea didyma) and Remm's rustic (Mesapamea remmi). All three were raised to species level. See Townsend et al. for diagnoses.

== Technical description and variation ==
P. secalis L. (= lamda View., lancea Esp., vilis Hbn.). Forewing varying in ground colour from bluish white, cream white, through pale and dark grey, sometimes ochreous or brownish-tinged, to grey brown, redbrown. or purplish brown; the median area and terminal area darker, fuscous brown or blackish brown, generally with a broad black brown streak from below the claviform stigma along submedian fold to outer line; a black dash from base below cell, and a black streak above inner margin near base; inner and outer lines double, dark, conversely lunulate-dentate; submarginal line pale with a narrow dark shading preceding it; claviform stigma small, black-edged; orbicular oblique, oval, of the ground colour, but often tinged- with rufous, with paler annulus and black outline, the reniform with a brown lunule in its inner side, filled in sometimes with ground colour, or with luteous, or white; veins often dark towards termen; hindwing fuscous; the form with the ground colour pale is ab. l-niger Haw. in this the markings are plainer than in those examples with the ground colour almost as dark as the median in ab. oculea Guen. the ground colour is pale ochreous or greyish ochreous, with the costal area as far as submarginal line black brown, this colour filling the cell and in median area reaching to submedian fold; the terminal area except at apex is also black brown; the reniform stigma varies as before, being sometimes of the ochreous ground colour, more rarely white; the streak near base above inner margin is brown black instead of black and sometimes obsolete; the black streak along submedian fold between the lines is never present; — in furca Haw. the ground colour is suffused with rufous and the contrast between the dark and light shades is less striking; rava Haw. has the ground colour rufous ochreous or brown with the dark brown of the costal area filling up the median area to inner margin, and is thus intermediate between secalis L. and oculea Guen.; grisea Tutt is an almost unicolorous grey form with hardly any clear markings, passing into reticulata Tutt which is a dull brown grey or fuscous grey form with the cross lines and stigmata more or less distinct, the reniform sometimes white, but more often of the ground colour; this is a common form in Britain; this passes again into the deep brown ab. nictitans Esp. and the black form, with more or less obscured markings, ab. leucostigma Esp; in these the reniform stigma is either yellowish or bright white, or, as often in British specimens, dark with the outer edge bearing 2 or 3 white dots only; in the very darkest forms the submarginal line is represented by fine pale dashes between the veins; two new forms, possibly specifically distinct, must be named; ab. pulverosa ab. nov., somewhat like ab. reticulata Tutt, but darker, suffused with brown and clouded, especially along costa, with blackish fuscous, in places thickly irrorated with whitish scales; veins strongly dusted with dark and pale scales; inner and outer lines distinct, filled up with ochreous; subterminal line brownish ochreous preceded by a deep brown cloud and followed by dull blackish terminal blotches on both folds; claviform and orbicular dull, brown, with black edges: reniform large, the inner half dark with a dark edged central brown lunule, the external margin yellow ochreous, except at lower end which is white; hindwing dark fuscous: head and thorax black brown: described from a male from Pescocostanzo, Italy, (Neumann); the second, ab. lilacina ab. nov. is from Silvaplana, in the Engadine, Switzerland; this has a dull lilac grey ground colour in basal and postmechan areas, with the median area and the terminal more diffusely dull rufous brown; the inner and outer lines and the reniform stigma filled up with lilac grey; the subterminal pale preceded by brownish shading; hindwing olive brownish; head and thorax violet-grey; pectus and legs paler but strongly tinged with violet; anal tufts fulvous. Larva greenish, with a double reddish dorsal line and yellow spiracular line; spiracles black; head pale brown. The wingspan is 27–30 mm.

== Biology ==
Adults are on wing from July to August depending on the location.

The larvae feed on the stems of various grasses, including Gramineae, Phleum and Alopecurus species, Triticum aestivum, Secale cereale, Elytrigia repens, Elymus arenarius, Dactylis glomerata and Festuca arundinacea.
