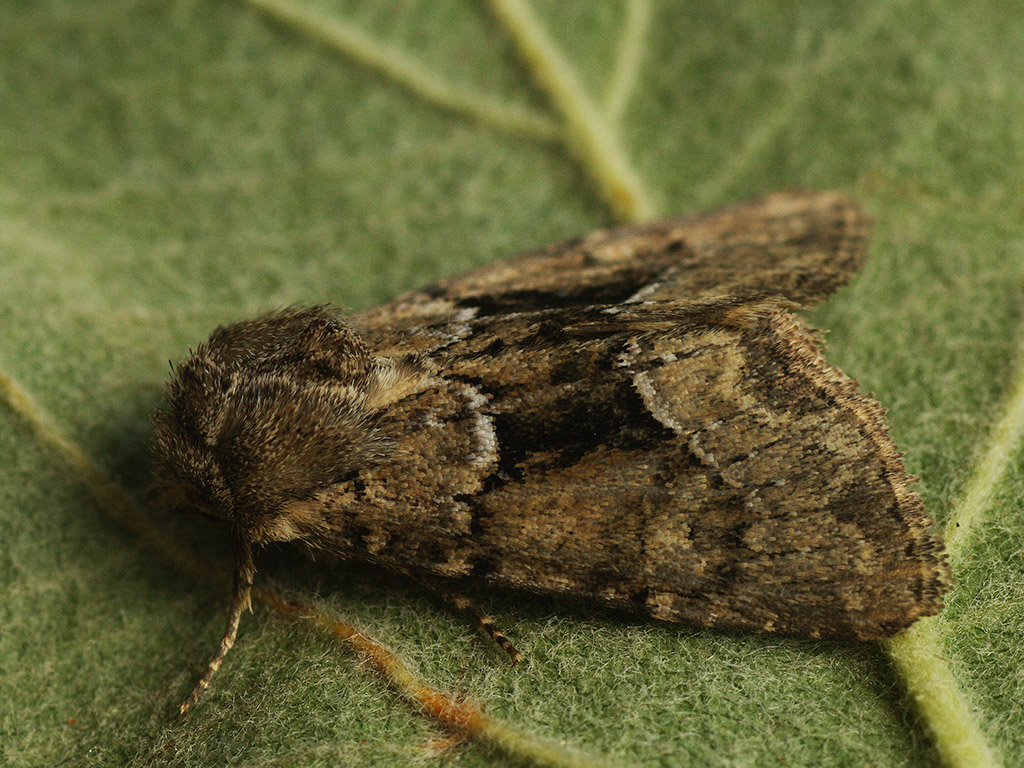
- Xylomoia

Scientific classification
- Domain: Eukaryota
- Kingdom: Animalia
- Phylum: Arthropoda
- Class: Insecta
- Order: Lepidoptera
- Superfamily: Noctuoidea
- Family: Noctuidae
- Tribe: Apameini
- Genus: Xylomoia; Staudinger, 1892

= Xylomoia =

Genus of moths

Xylomoia is a genus of moths of the family Noctuidae.

== Species ==
- Xylomoia apameoides Hacker, 1989
- Xylomoia chagnoni Barnes & Benjamin, 1917
- Xylomoia fusei Sugi, 1976
- Xylomoia graminea (Graeser, [1889])
- Xylomoia indirecta (Grote, 1875)
- Xylomoia retinax Mikkola, 1998
- Xylomoia stangelmaieri Mikkola, 1998
- Xylomoia strix Mikkola, 1980

== Former species ==
- Xylomoia didonea is now Photedes didonea (Smith, 1894)
