= Oligia minuscula =

Scientific classification
- Domain: Eukaryota
- Kingdom: Animalia
- Phylum: Arthropoda
- Class: Insecta
- Order: Lepidoptera
- Superfamily: Noctuoidea
- Family: Noctuidae
- Tribe: Apameini
- Genus: Oligia
- Species: O. minuscula

Binomial name
- Oligia minuscula (Morrison, 1875)

Species of moth

Oligia minuscula, known generally as the small brocade or bog oligia, is a species of cutworm or dart moth in the family Noctuidae. It is found in North America.

The MONA or Hodges number for Oligia minuscula is 9416.

== Subspecies ==
These two subspecies belong to the species Oligia minuscula:

- Oligia minuscula grahami Benjamin, 1933
- Oligia minuscula minuscula
