= Neoligia tonsa =

Scientific classification
- Kingdom: Animalia
- Phylum: Arthropoda
- Class: Insecta
- Order: Lepidoptera
- Superfamily: Noctuoidea
- Family: Noctuidae
- Genus: Neoligia
- Species: N. tonsa

Binomial name
- Neoligia tonsa (Grote, 1880)

Species of moth

Neoligia tonsa is a species of cutworm or dart moth in the family Noctuidae.

The MONA or Hodges number for Neoligia tonsa is 9413.
