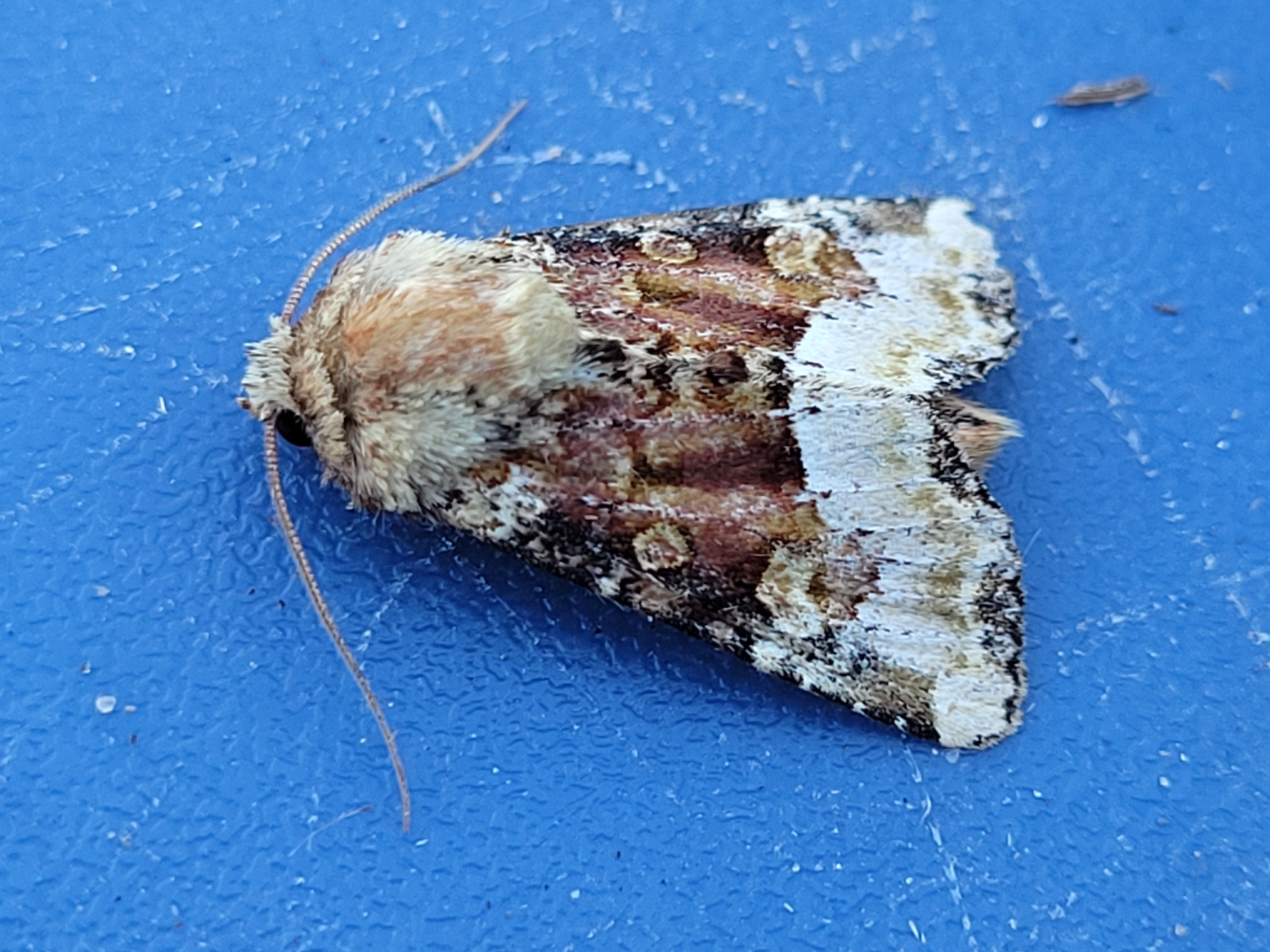

Scientific classification
- Kingdom: Animalia
- Phylum: Arthropoda
- Class: Insecta
- Order: Lepidoptera
- Superfamily: Noctuoidea
- Family: Noctuidae
- Tribe: Apameini
- Genus: Oligia
- Species: O. egens

Binomial name
- Oligia egens (Walker, 1857)

= Oligia egens =

Species of moth

Oligia egens, commonly known as Neumoegen's Quaker, is a species of cutworm or dart moth in the family Noctuidae.
