= Platypolia loda =

Scientific classification
- Domain: Eukaryota
- Kingdom: Animalia
- Phylum: Arthropoda
- Class: Insecta
- Order: Lepidoptera
- Superfamily: Noctuoidea
- Family: Noctuidae
- Tribe: Xylenini
- Subtribe: Antitypina
- Genus: Platypolia
- Species: P. loda

Binomial name
- Platypolia loda (Strecker, 1898)

Species of moth

Platypolia loda is a species of cutworm or dart moth in the family Noctuidae. It is found in North America.

The MONA or Hodges number for Platypolia loda is 9978.

== Subspecies ==
These two subspecies belong to the species Platypolia loda:

- Platypolia loda gunderi Barnes & Benjamin, 1927
- Platypolia loda loda
