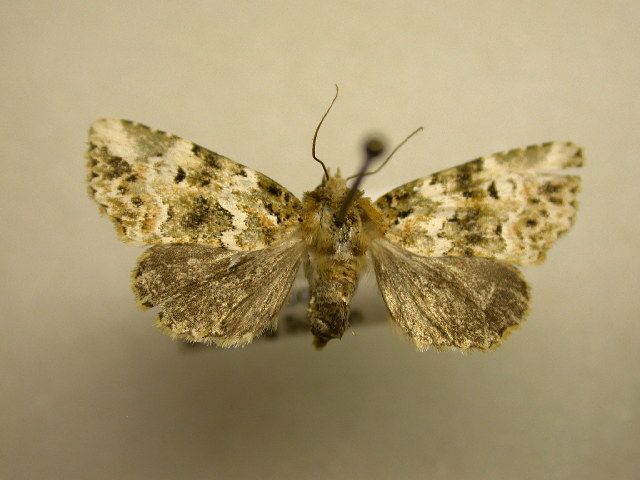

Scientific classification
- Domain: Eukaryota
- Kingdom: Animalia
- Phylum: Arthropoda
- Class: Insecta
- Order: Lepidoptera
- Superfamily: Noctuoidea
- Family: Noctuidae
- Genus: Chytonix
- Species: C. elegans

Binomial name
- Chytonix elegans Schaus 1911

= Chytonix elegans =

Species of moth

Chytonix elegans is a species of moth of the family Noctuidae found in Costa Rica. The species was described by Schaus in 1911.
