= Xylomoia strix =

Scientific classification
- Kingdom: Animalia
- Phylum: Arthropoda
- Clade: Pancrustacea
- Class: Insecta
- Order: Lepidoptera
- Superfamily: Noctuoidea
- Family: Noctuidae
- Genus: Xylomoia
- Species: X. strix

Binomial name
- Xylomoia strix Mikkola, 1980

Species of moth

Xylomoia strix is a species of moth, belonging to the genus Xylomoia.

It is native to Eastern Europe.
