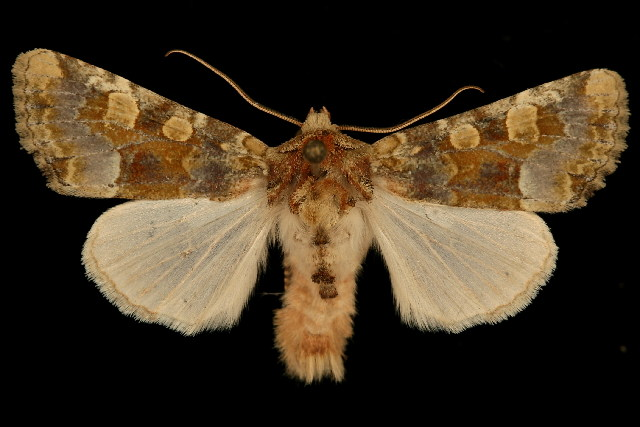

Scientific classification
- Kingdom: Animalia
- Phylum: Arthropoda
- Class: Insecta
- Order: Lepidoptera
- Superfamily: Noctuoidea
- Family: Noctuidae
- Genus: Oligia
- Species: O. violacea

Binomial name
- Oligia violacea (Grote, 1881)

= Oligia violacea =

Species of moth

Oligia violacea is a species of cutworm or dart moth in the family Noctuidae. It is found in North America.

The MONA or Hodges number for Oligia violacea is 9414.
