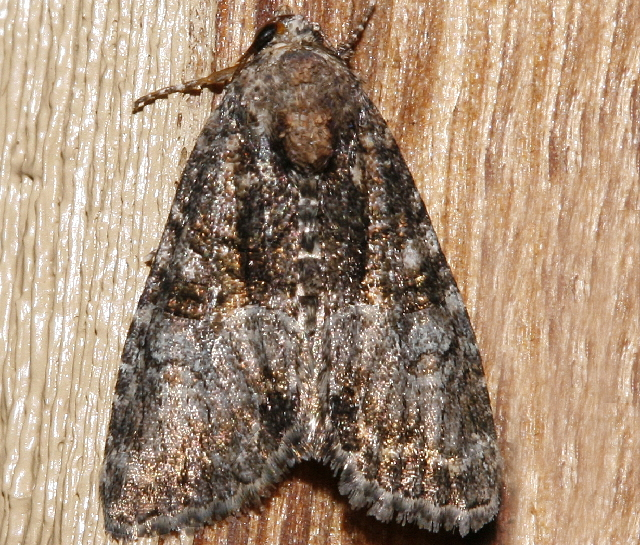
- Neoligia invenusta

Scientific classification
- Domain: Eukaryota
- Kingdom: Animalia
- Phylum: Arthropoda
- Class: Insecta
- Order: Lepidoptera
- Superfamily: Noctuoidea
- Family: Noctuidae
- Tribe: Apameini
- Genus: Neoligia; Troubridge & Lafontaine, 2002

= Neoligia =

Genus of moths

Neoligia is a genus of moths of the family Noctuidae. Most of the species where previously part of the semicana group of the genus Oligia.

== Species ==
- Neoligia albirena Troubridge & Lafontaine, 2002
- Neoligia atlantica Troubridge & Lafontaine, 2002
- Neoligia canadendsis Troubridge & Lafontaine, 2002
- Neoligia crytora (Franclemont, 1950)
- Neoligia elephas Troubridge & Lafontaine, 2002
- Neoligia exhausta (Smith, 1903)
- Neoligia hardwicki Troubridge & Lafontaine, 2002
- Neoligia inermis Troubridge & Lafontaine, 2002
- Neoligia invenusta Troubridge & Lafontaine, 2002
- Neoligia lancea Troubridge & Lafontaine, 2002
- Neoligia lillooet Troubridge & Lafontaine, 2002
- Neoligia pagosa Troubridge & Lafontaine, 2002
- Neoligia rubirena Troubridge & Lafontaine, 2002
- Neoligia semicana (Walker, 1865) (syn: Neoligia hausta (Grote, 1882))
- Neoligia subjuncta (Smith, 1898) (syn: Neoligia laevigata (Smith, 1898))
- Neoligia surdirena Troubridge & Lafontaine, 2002
- Neoligia tonsa (Grote, 1880)
