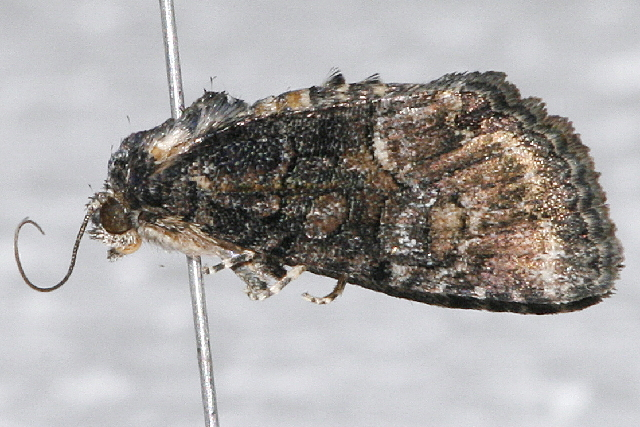

Scientific classification
- Kingdom: Animalia
- Phylum: Arthropoda
- Clade: Pancrustacea
- Class: Insecta
- Order: Lepidoptera
- Superfamily: Noctuoidea
- Family: Noctuidae
- Tribe: Apameini
- Genus: Neoligia
- Species: N. invenusta

Binomial name
- Neoligia invenusta Troubridge & Lafontaine, 2002

= Neoligia invenusta =

Species of moth

Neoligia invenusta is a species of cutworm or dart moth in the family Noctuidae. It is found in North America.

The MONA or Hodges number for Neoligia invenusta is 9413.2.
