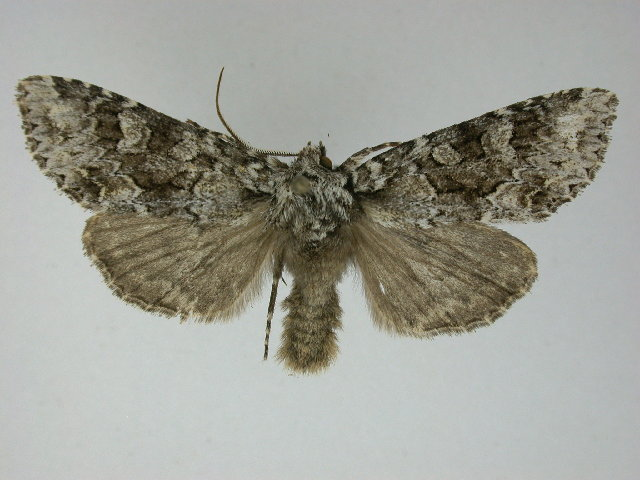

Scientific classification
- Kingdom: Animalia
- Phylum: Arthropoda
- Clade: Pancrustacea
- Class: Insecta
- Order: Lepidoptera
- Superfamily: Noctuoidea
- Family: Noctuidae
- Tribe: Xylenini
- Subtribe: Antitypina
- Genus: Platypolia
- Species: P. anceps

Binomial name
- Platypolia anceps (Stephens, 1850)

= Platypolia anceps =

Species of moth

Platypolia anceps is a species of cutworm or dart moth in the family Noctuidae. It is found in North America.
