= Oligia rampartensis =

Scientific classification
- Domain: Eukaryota
- Kingdom: Animalia
- Phylum: Arthropoda
- Class: Insecta
- Order: Lepidoptera
- Superfamily: Noctuoidea
- Family: Noctuidae
- Genus: Oligia
- Species: O. rampartensis

Binomial name
- Oligia rampartensis Barnes & Benjamin, 1923

Species of moth

Oligia rampartensis is a species of cutworm or dart moth in the family Noctuidae first described by William Barnes and Foster Hendrickson Benjamin in 1923. It is found in North America.

The MONA or Hodges number for Oligia rampartensis is 9414.1.
