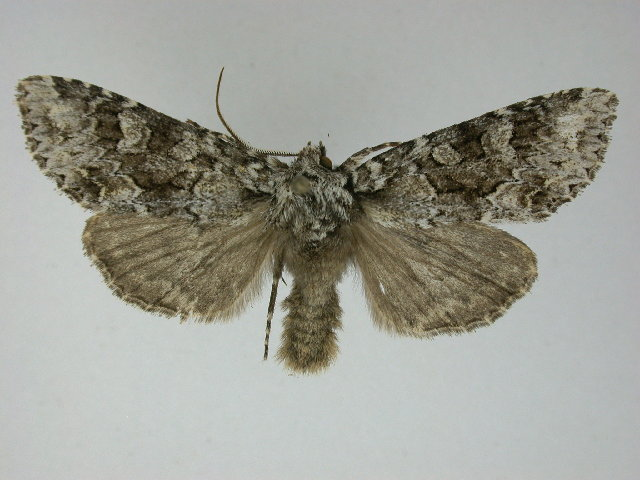
- Platypolia anceps

Scientific classification
- Domain: Eukaryota
- Kingdom: Animalia
- Phylum: Arthropoda
- Class: Insecta
- Order: Lepidoptera
- Superfamily: Noctuoidea
- Family: Noctuidae
- Subtribe: Antitypina
- Genus: Platypolia; Grote, 1895

= Platypolia =

Genus of moths

Platypolia is a genus of moths of the family Noctuidae.

== Species ==
- Platypolia anceps (Stephens, 1850)
- Platypolia contadina (Smith, 1894)
- Platypolia loda (Strecker, 1898)
- Platypolia mactata (Guenée, 1852)
