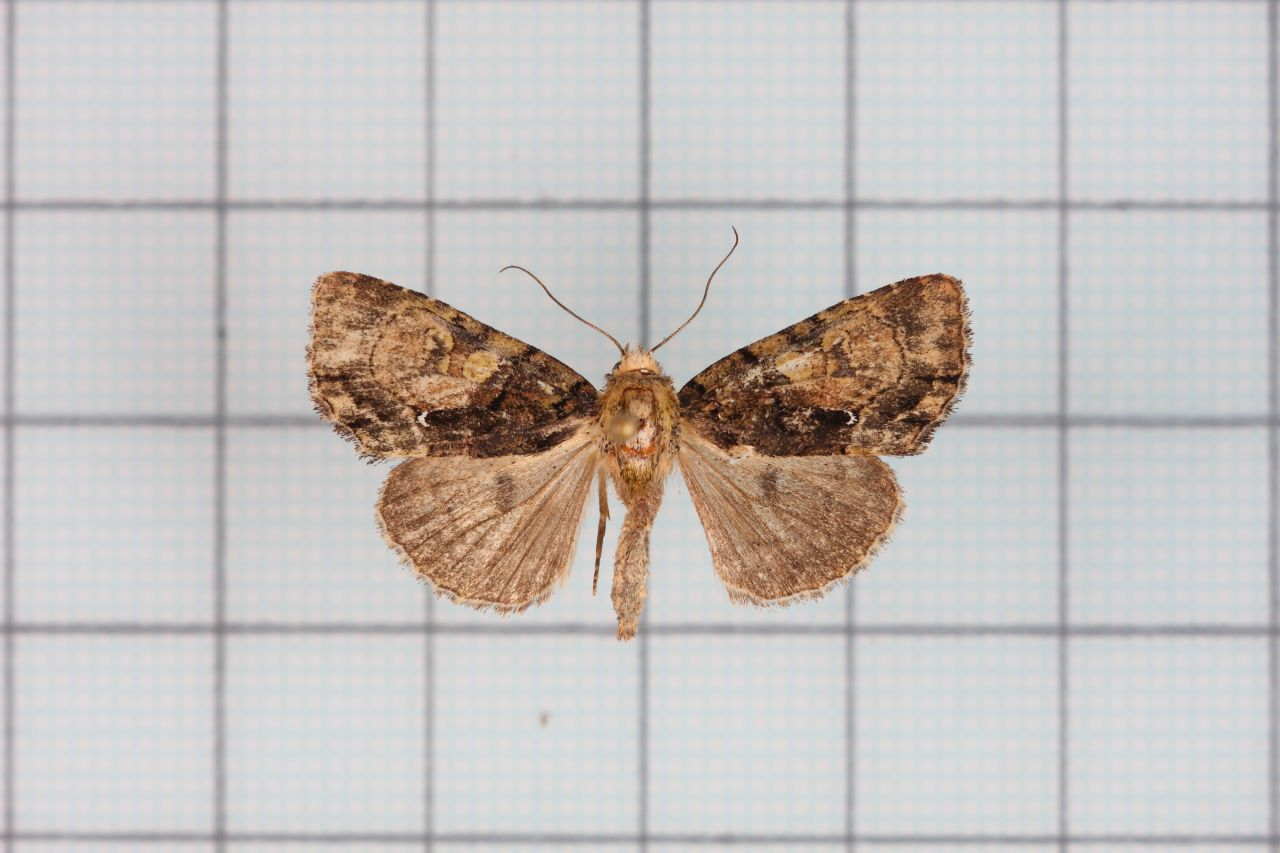

Scientific classification
- Domain: Eukaryota
- Kingdom: Animalia
- Phylum: Arthropoda
- Class: Insecta
- Order: Lepidoptera
- Superfamily: Noctuoidea
- Family: Noctuidae
- Genus: Chytonix
- Species: C. variegata

Binomial name
- Chytonix variegata Wileman, 1914

= Chytonix variegata =

Species of moth

Chytonix variegata is a moth of the family Noctuidae first described by Wileman in 1914. It is found in Taiwan.
