= Platypolia contadina =

Scientific classification
- Domain: Eukaryota
- Kingdom: Animalia
- Phylum: Arthropoda
- Class: Insecta
- Order: Lepidoptera
- Superfamily: Noctuoidea
- Family: Noctuidae
- Tribe: Xylenini
- Subtribe: Antitypina
- Genus: Platypolia
- Species: P. contadina

Binomial name
- Platypolia contadina (Smith, 1894)

Species of moth

Platypolia contadina is a species of cutworm or dart moth in the family Noctuidae. It is found in North America.

The MONA or Hodges number for Platypolia contadina is 9977.
