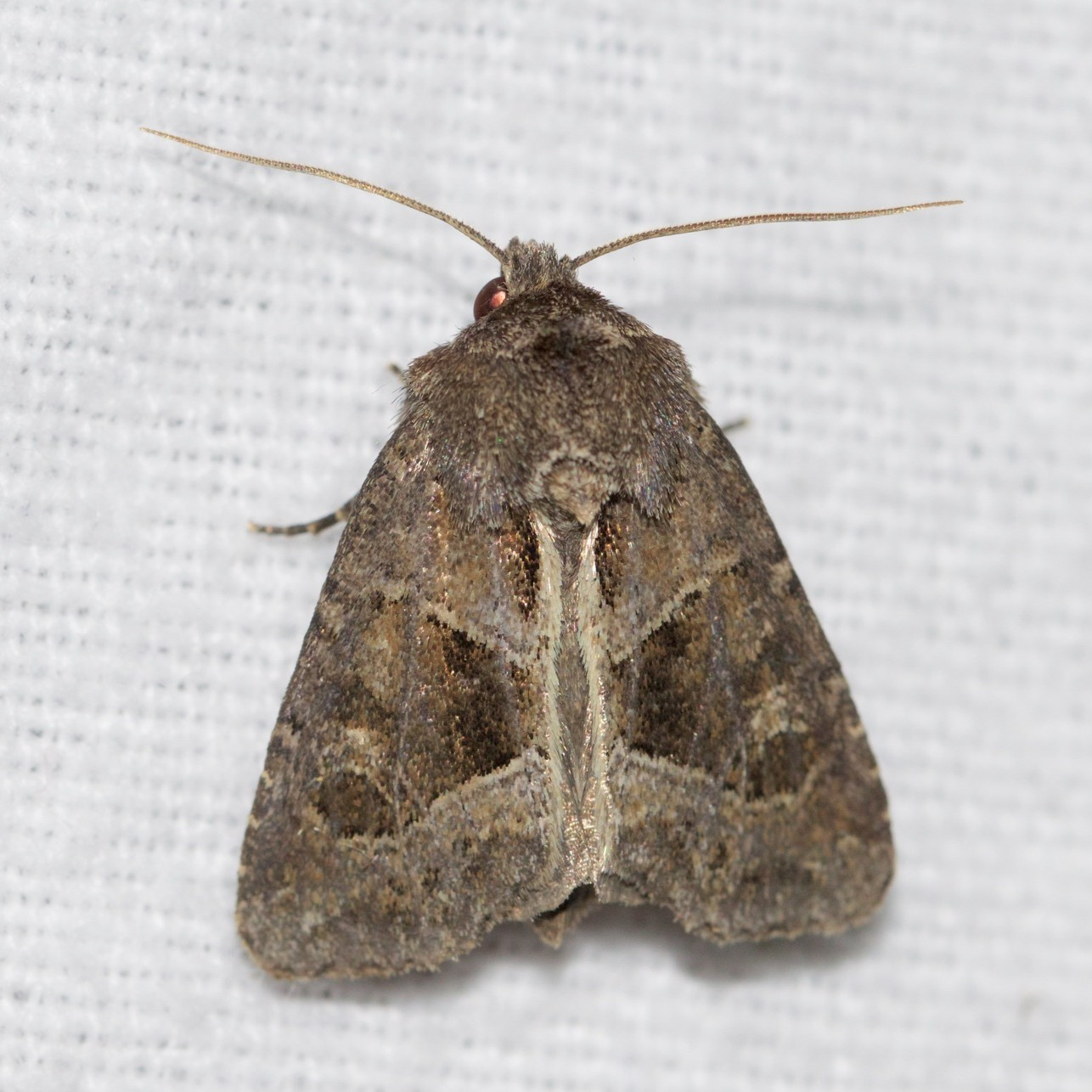

Scientific classification
- Kingdom: Animalia
- Phylum: Arthropoda
- Class: Insecta
- Order: Lepidoptera
- Superfamily: Noctuoidea
- Family: Noctuidae
- Tribe: Apameini
- Genus: Oligia
- Species: O. obtusa

Binomial name
- Oligia obtusa (Smith, 1902)

= Oligia obtusa =

Species of moth

Oligia obtusa is a species of cutworm or dart moth in the family Noctuidae.
