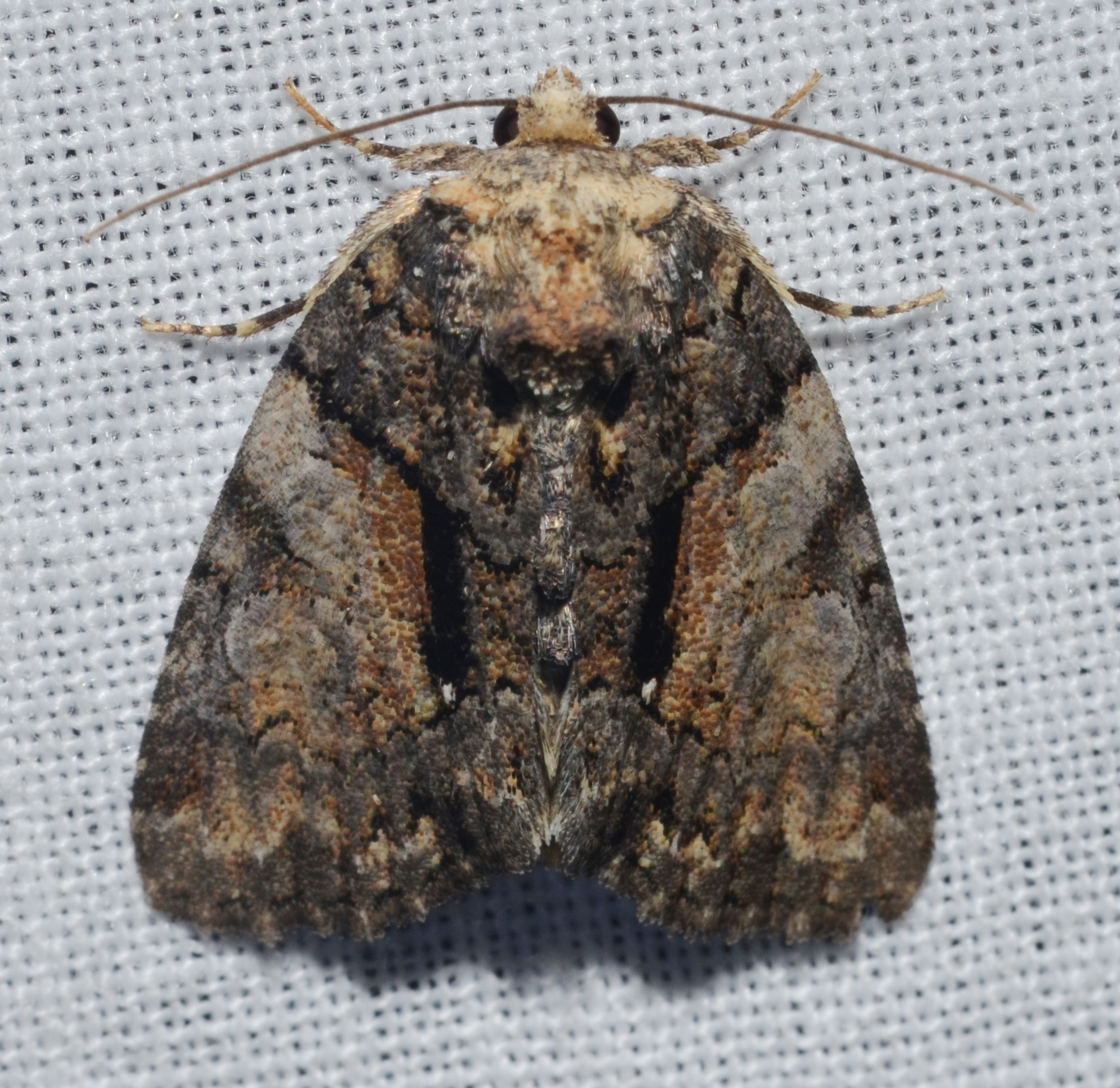

Scientific classification
- Kingdom: Animalia
- Phylum: Arthropoda
- Class: Insecta
- Order: Lepidoptera
- Superfamily: Noctuoidea
- Family: Noctuidae
- Genus: Chytonix
- Species: C. palliatricula

Binomial name
- Chytonix palliatricula (Guenee, 1852)

Synonyms
- Bryophila palliatricula Guenee, 1852; Apamea iaspis Guenee, 1852

= Chytonix palliatricula =

Species of moth

Chytonix palliatricula, the cloaked marvel moth, is a moth of the family Noctuidae. The species was first described by Achille Guenée in 1852. It is found in North America, where it has been recorded from southern Canada to the Gulf Coast. The range extends west into the Great Plains to Nebraska and Oklahoma in the south and Alberta and British Columbia in the north. It is also found in Mexico, Guatemala and Panama.

The wingspan is 28–33 mm. Adults are on wing in late spring and summer.

The larvae probably feed on Poaceae species.
