= Xylomoia chagnoni =

Scientific classification
- Kingdom: Animalia
- Phylum: Arthropoda
- Class: Insecta
- Order: Lepidoptera
- Superfamily: Noctuoidea
- Family: Noctuidae
- Genus: Xylomoia
- Species: X. chagnoni

Binomial name
- Xylomoia chagnoni Barnes & McDunnough, 1917

Species of moth

Xylomoia chagnoni, reed canary grass borer moth, reed canary grass borer, or Chang borer moth [sic], is a species of cutworm or dart moth in the family Noctuidae. It was first described by William Barnes and James Halliday McDunnough in 1917. It is found in the Northeastern United States and southeastern Canada west to Wyoming and Manitoba. It is named after Gustave Chagnon, the collector.

The wingspan is about 29–30 mm (1.1–1.2 in).
