= Oligia chlorostigma =

Scientific classification
- Domain: Eukaryota
- Kingdom: Animalia
- Phylum: Arthropoda
- Class: Insecta
- Order: Lepidoptera
- Superfamily: Noctuoidea
- Family: Noctuidae
- Tribe: Apameini
- Genus: Oligia
- Species: O. chlorostigma

Binomial name
- Oligia chlorostigma (Harvey, 1876)

Species of moth

Oligia chlorostigma is a species of cutworm or dart moth in the family Noctuidae.

The MONA or Hodges number for Oligia chlorostigma is 9402.
