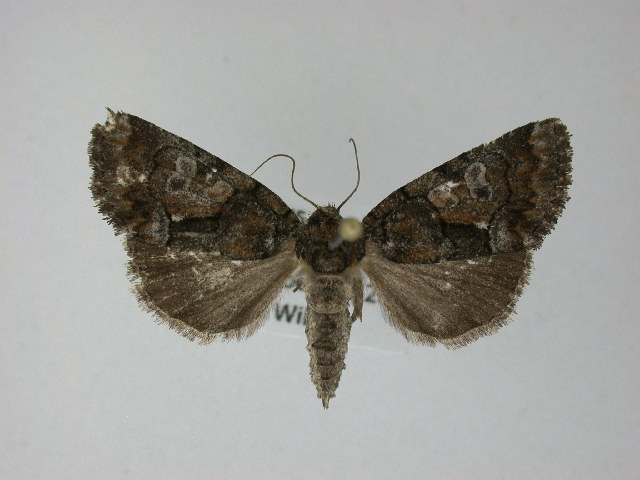

Scientific classification
- Domain: Eukaryota
- Kingdom: Animalia
- Phylum: Arthropoda
- Class: Insecta
- Order: Lepidoptera
- Superfamily: Noctuoidea
- Family: Noctuidae
- Genus: Chytonix
- Species: C. sensilis

Binomial name
- Chytonix sensilis Grote, 1881

Synonyms
- Chytonix submediana Strand, 1916; Chytonix macdonaldi Benjamin, 1922

= Chytonix sensilis =

Species of moth

Chytonix sensilis, the barrens chytonix, is a species of moth of the family Noctuidae found in North America. It ranges from Quebec to Florida, and from Michigan to Texas. It was first described by Augustus Radcliffe Grote in 1881 and is now listed as endangered in the US state of Connecticut.

The wingspan is 26–31 mm. Adults are on wing in late summer.

The larvae graze fungi off leaf litter, mostly off dead wood.
