= Neoligia crytora =

Scientific classification
- Domain: Eukaryota
- Kingdom: Animalia
- Phylum: Arthropoda
- Class: Insecta
- Order: Lepidoptera
- Superfamily: Noctuoidea
- Family: Noctuidae
- Tribe: Apameini
- Genus: Neoligia
- Species: N. crytora

Binomial name
- Neoligia crytora (Franclemont, 1950)

Species of moth

Neoligia crytora is a species of cutworm or dart moth in the family Noctuidae.

The MONA or Hodges number for Neoligia crytora is 9410.
