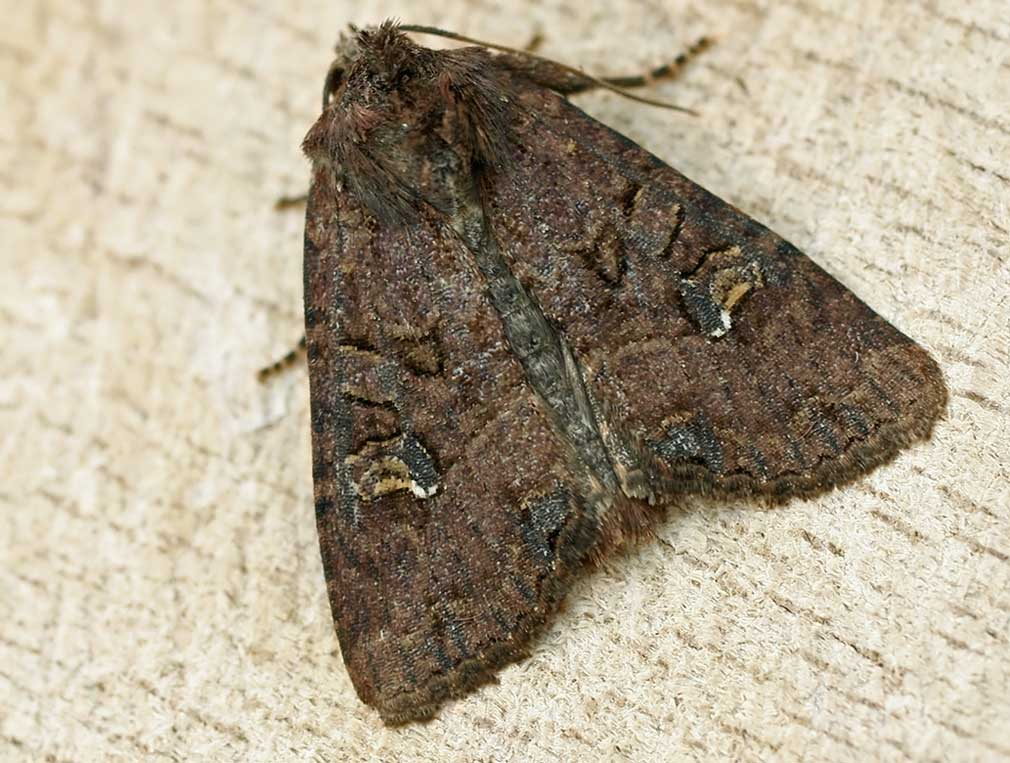
- Mesapamea secalis

Scientific classification
- Domain: Eukaryota
- Kingdom: Animalia
- Phylum: Arthropoda
- Class: Insecta
- Order: Lepidoptera
- Superfamily: Noctuoidea
- Family: Noctuidae
- Tribe: Apameini
- Genus: Mesapamea; Heinicke, 1959

= Mesapamea =

Genus of moths

Mesapamea is a genus of moths of the family Noctuidae.

== Species ==
- Mesapamea arbora (Barnes & McDunnough, 1912) (syn: Mesapamea mactatoides (Barnes & McDunnough, 1912))
- Mesapamea calcirena (Püngeler, 1902)
- Mesapamea concinnata Heinicke, 1959
- Mesapamea evidentis Heinicke, 1959
- Mesapamea fractilinea (Grote, 1874)
- Mesapamea maderensis Pinker, [1971]
- Mesapamea moderata (Eversmann, 1843)
- Mesapamea monotona Heinicke, 1959
- Mesapamea pinkeri Bacallado, 1972
- Mesapamea remmi Rezbanyai-Reser, 1985
- Mesapamea secalella Remm, 1983
- Mesapamea secalindica Rezbanyai-Reser, 1986
- Mesapamea secalis (Linnaeus, 1758)
- Mesapamea storai (Rebel, [1940])
