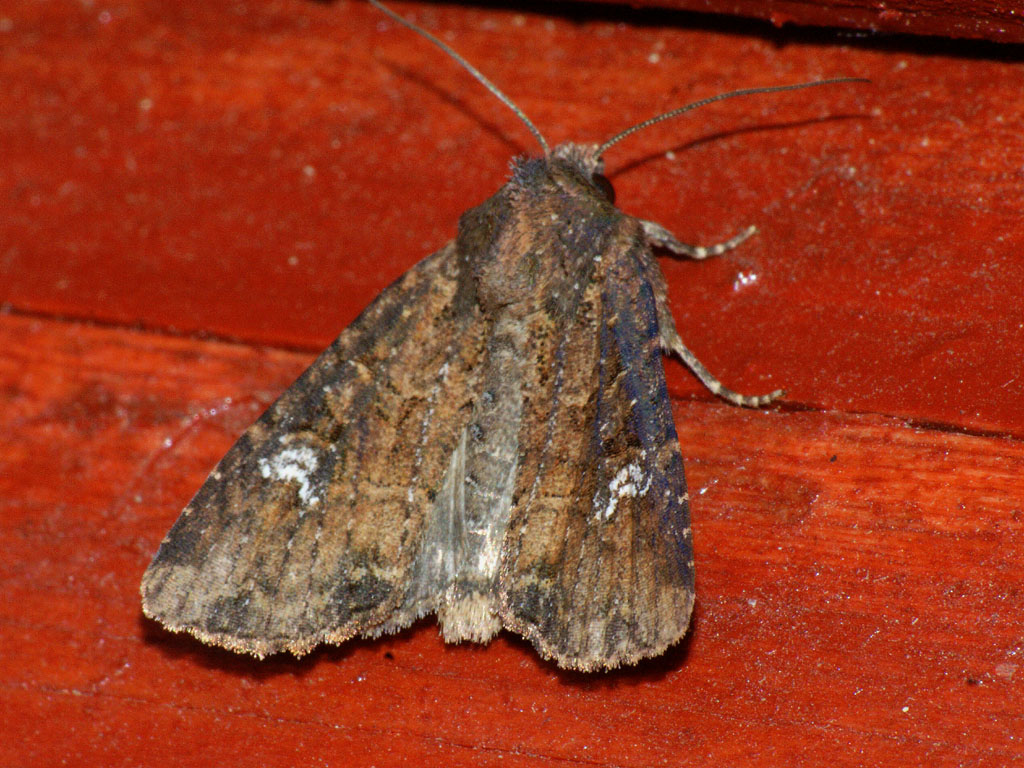

Scientific classification
- Domain: Eukaryota
- Kingdom: Animalia
- Phylum: Arthropoda
- Class: Insecta
- Order: Lepidoptera
- Superfamily: Noctuoidea
- Family: Noctuidae
- Genus: Mesapamea
- Species: M. secalella

Binomial name
- Mesapamea secalella Remm, 1983

= Mesapamea secalella =

Species of moth

Mesapamea secalella is a moth belonging to the family Noctuidae. The species was first described by X. Remm in 1983.

It is native to Europe.
