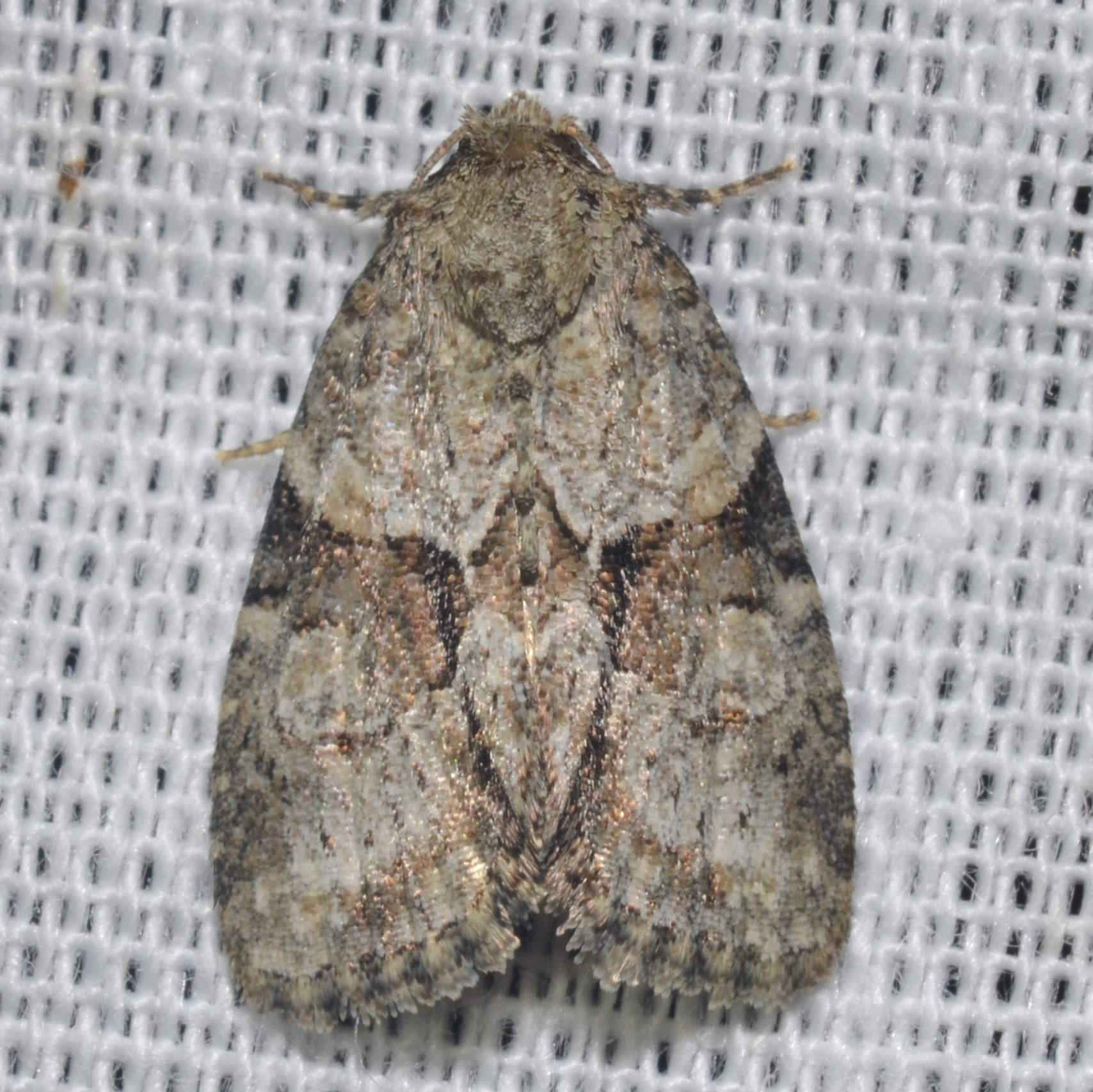

Scientific classification
- Domain: Eukaryota
- Kingdom: Animalia
- Phylum: Arthropoda
- Class: Insecta
- Order: Lepidoptera
- Superfamily: Noctuoidea
- Family: Noctuidae
- Tribe: Apameini
- Genus: Neoligia
- Species: N. exhausta

Binomial name
- Neoligia exhausta (Smith, 1903)

= Neoligia exhausta =

Species of moth

Neoligia exhausta, the exhausted brocade, is a species of cutworm or dart moth in the family Noctuidae.

The MONA or Hodges number for Neoligia exhausta is 9408.
