= Oligia tusa =

Scientific classification
- Domain: Eukaryota
- Kingdom: Animalia
- Phylum: Arthropoda
- Class: Insecta
- Order: Lepidoptera
- Superfamily: Noctuoidea
- Family: Noctuidae
- Genus: Oligia
- Species: O. tusa

Binomial name
- Oligia tusa (Grote, 1878)

Species of moth

Oligia tusa is a species of cutworm or dart moth in the family Noctuidae. It is found in North America.

The MONA or Hodges number for Oligia tusa is 9405.
