= Oligia bridghamii =

Scientific classification
- Domain: Eukaryota
- Kingdom: Animalia
- Phylum: Arthropoda
- Class: Insecta
- Order: Lepidoptera
- Superfamily: Noctuoidea
- Family: Noctuidae
- Genus: Oligia
- Species: O. bridghamii

Binomial name
- Oligia bridghamii (Grote & Robinson, 1866)

Species of moth

Oligia bridghamii, or Bridgham's brocade, is a species of cutworm or dart moth in the family Noctuidae. It was described by Augustus Radcliffe Grote and Coleman Townsend Robinson and is found in North America.

The MONA or Hodges number for Oligia bridghamii is 9415.
