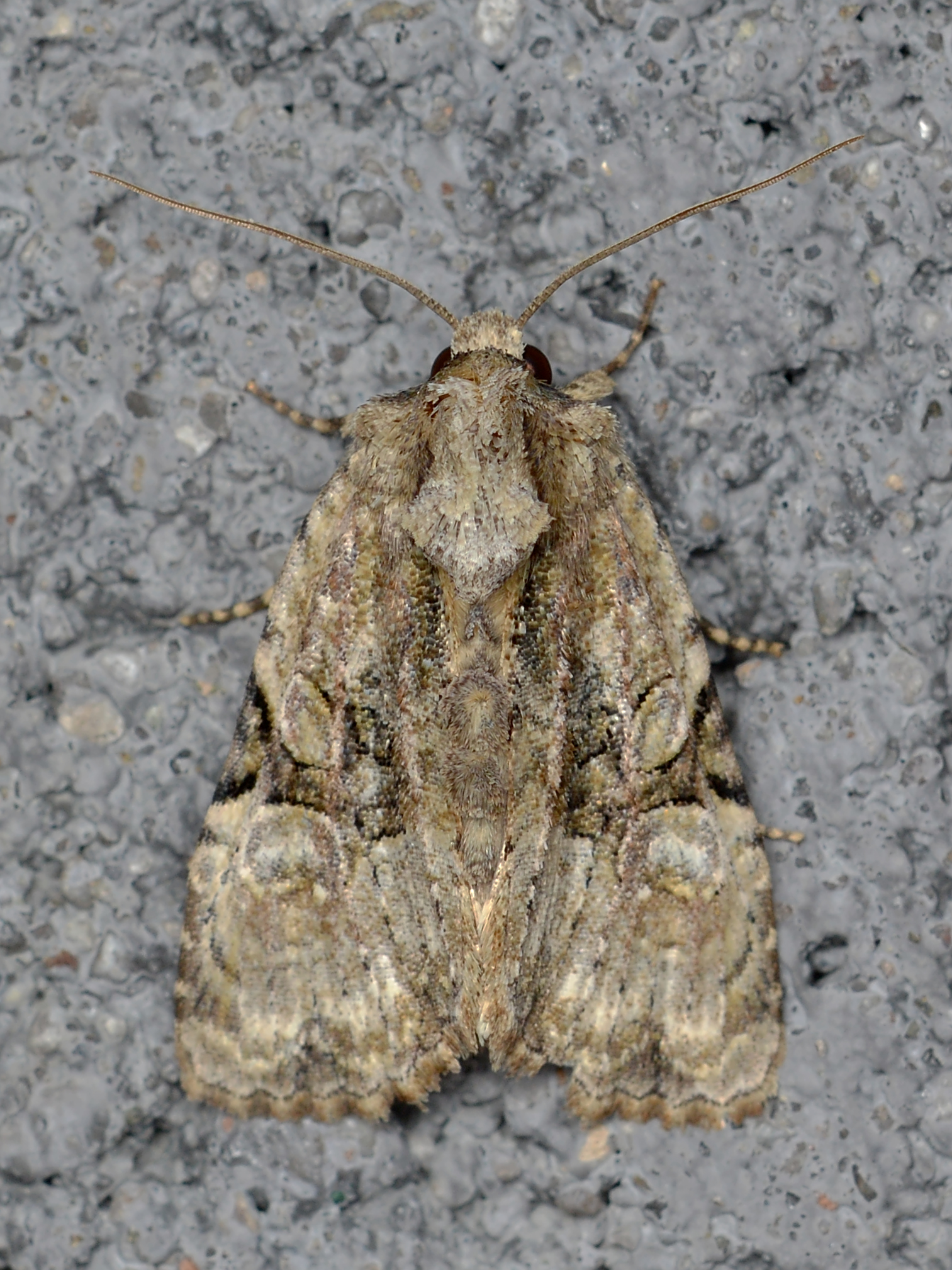

Scientific classification
- Domain: Eukaryota
- Kingdom: Animalia
- Phylum: Arthropoda
- Class: Insecta
- Order: Lepidoptera
- Superfamily: Noctuoidea
- Family: Noctuidae
- Tribe: Apameini
- Genus: Oligia
- Species: O. modica

Binomial name
- Oligia modica (Guenée, 1852)

= Oligia modica =

Species of moth

Oligia modica, the black-banded brocade, is a species of cutworm or dart moth in the family Noctuidae. It is found in North America.

The MONA or Hodges number for Oligia modica is 9404.

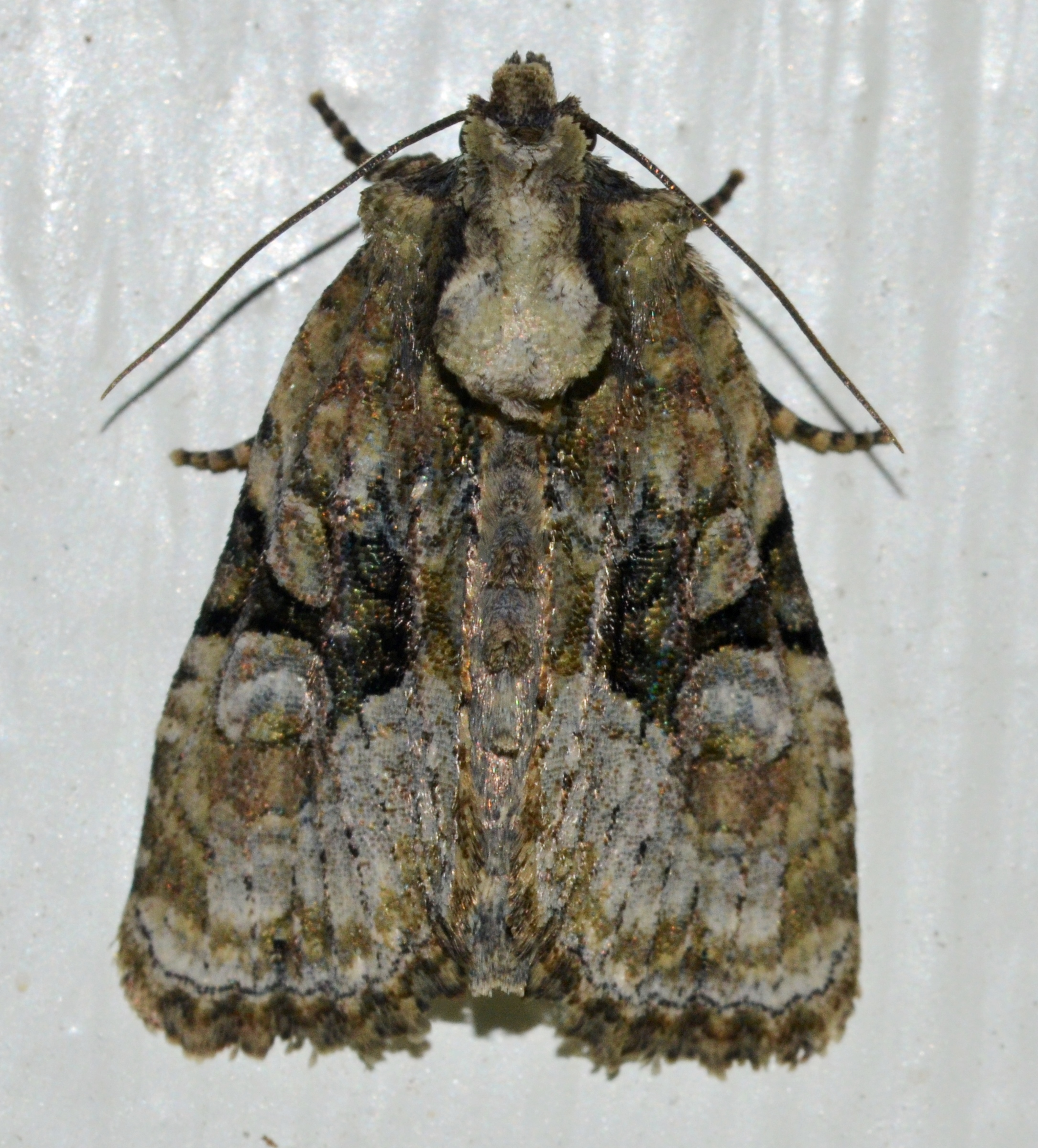
Black-banded brocade, Oligia modica

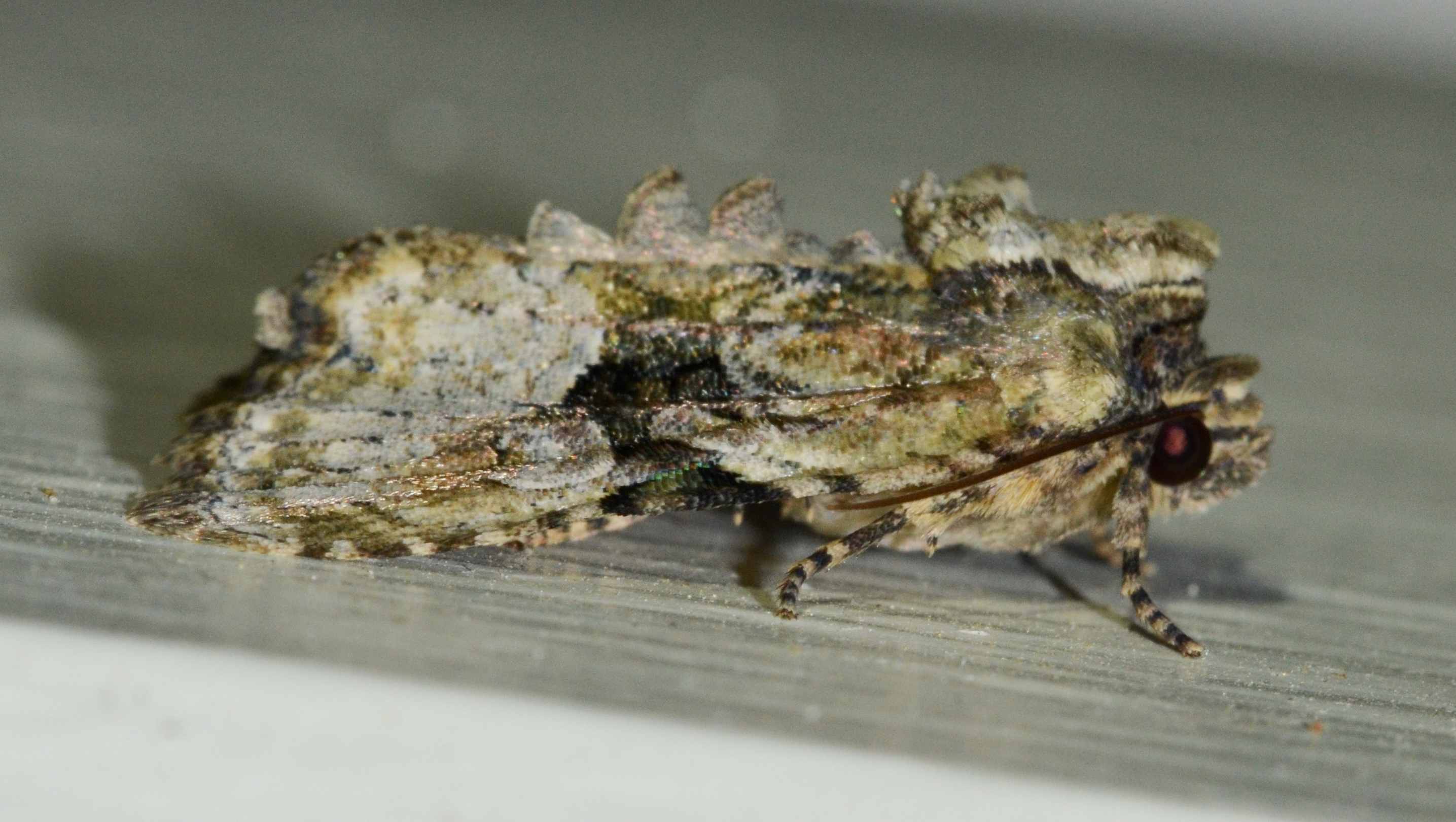
Black-banded brocade, Oligia modica
