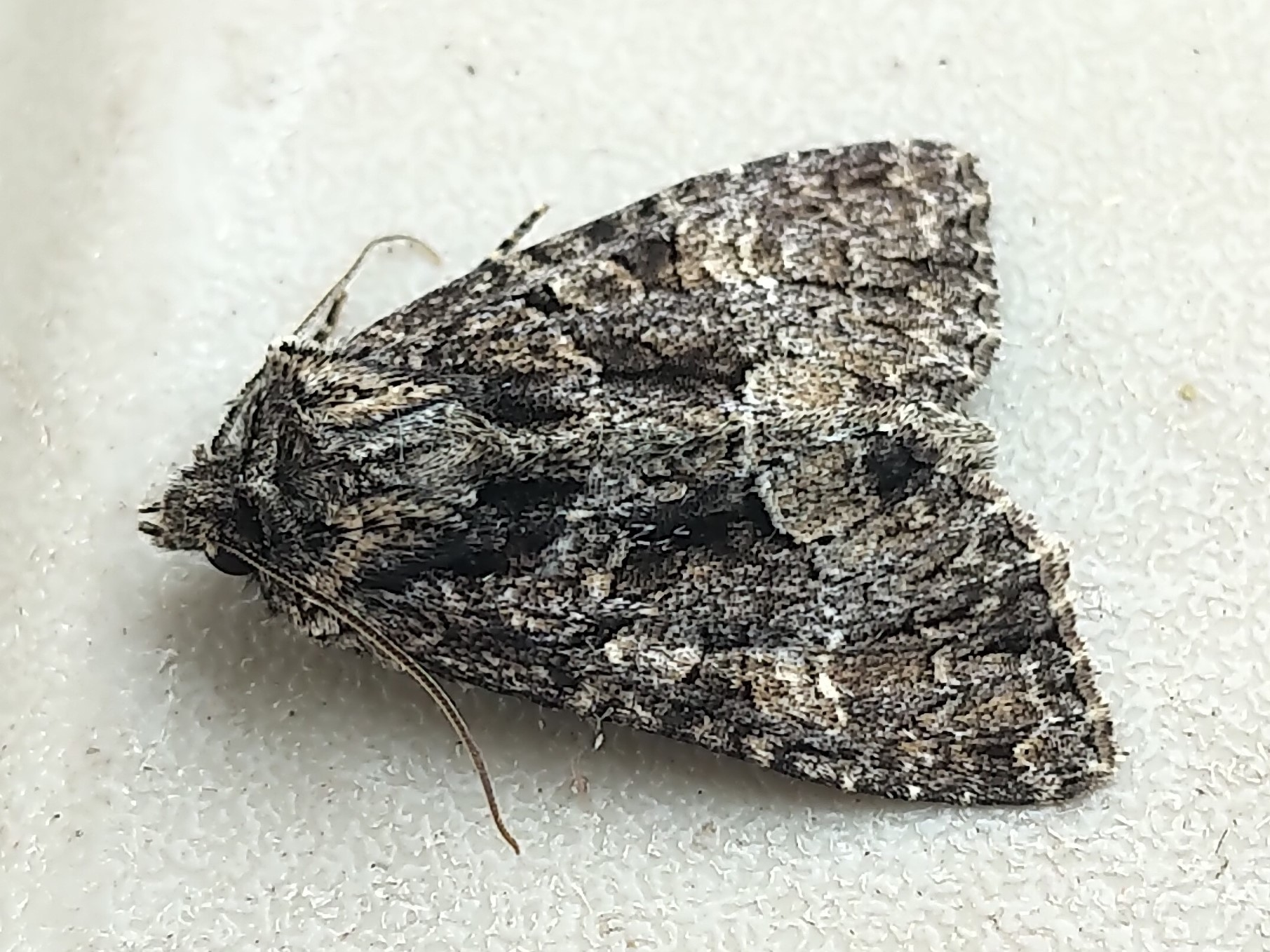

Scientific classification
- Kingdom: Animalia
- Phylum: Arthropoda
- Class: Insecta
- Order: Lepidoptera
- Superfamily: Noctuoidea
- Family: Noctuidae
- Genus: Platypolia
- Species: P. mactata

Binomial name
- Platypolia mactata (Guenée, 1852)

= Platypolia mactata =

Species of moth

Platypolia mactata, the adorable brocade, is a species of cutworm or dart moth in the family Noctuidae. It is found in North America.
