= Mesapamea remmi =

Scientific classification
- Domain: Eukaryota
- Kingdom: Animalia
- Phylum: Arthropoda
- Class: Insecta
- Order: Lepidoptera
- Superfamily: Noctuoidea
- Family: Noctuidae
- Genus: Mesapamea
- Species: M. remmi

Binomial name
- Mesapamea remmi Rezbanyai-Reser, 1985

Species of moth

Mesapamea remmi is a moth belonging to the family Noctuidae. The species was first described by Ladislaus Rezbanyai-Reser in 1985. For diagnosis See Townsend et al.

It is native to Europe.
