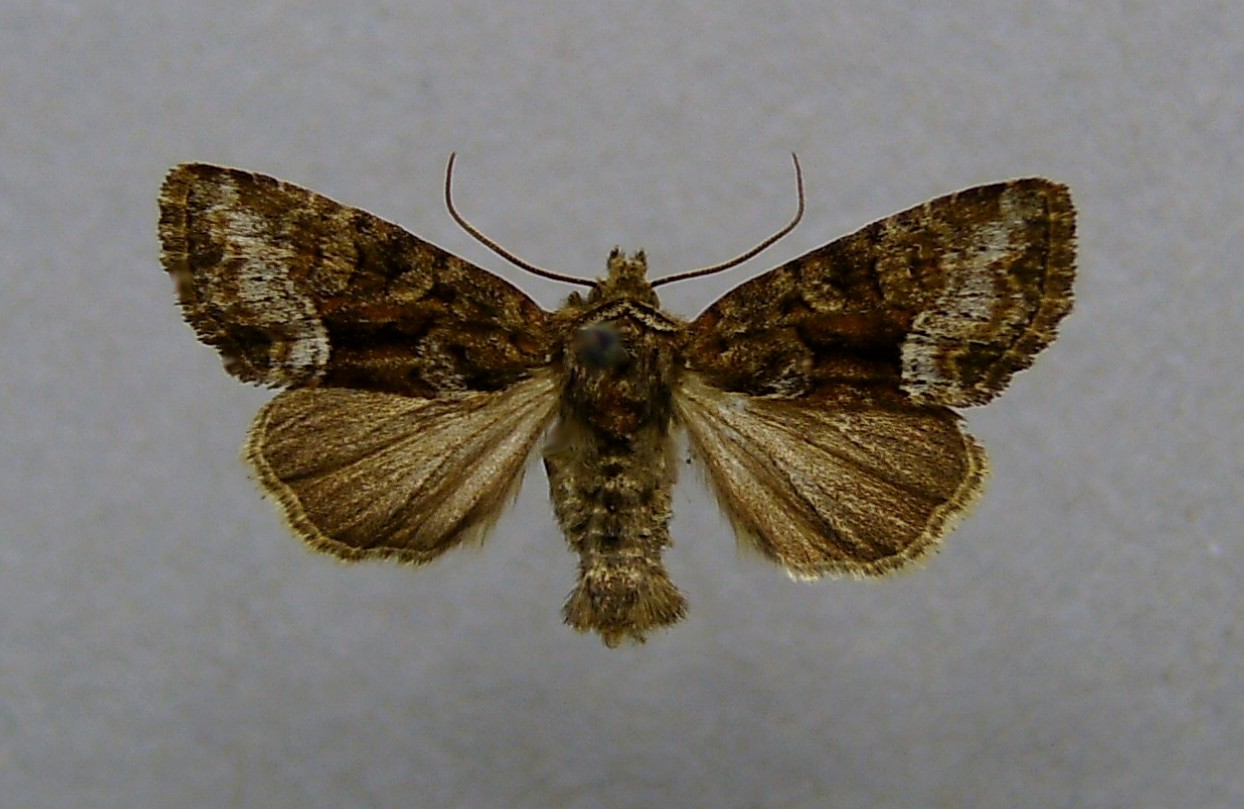

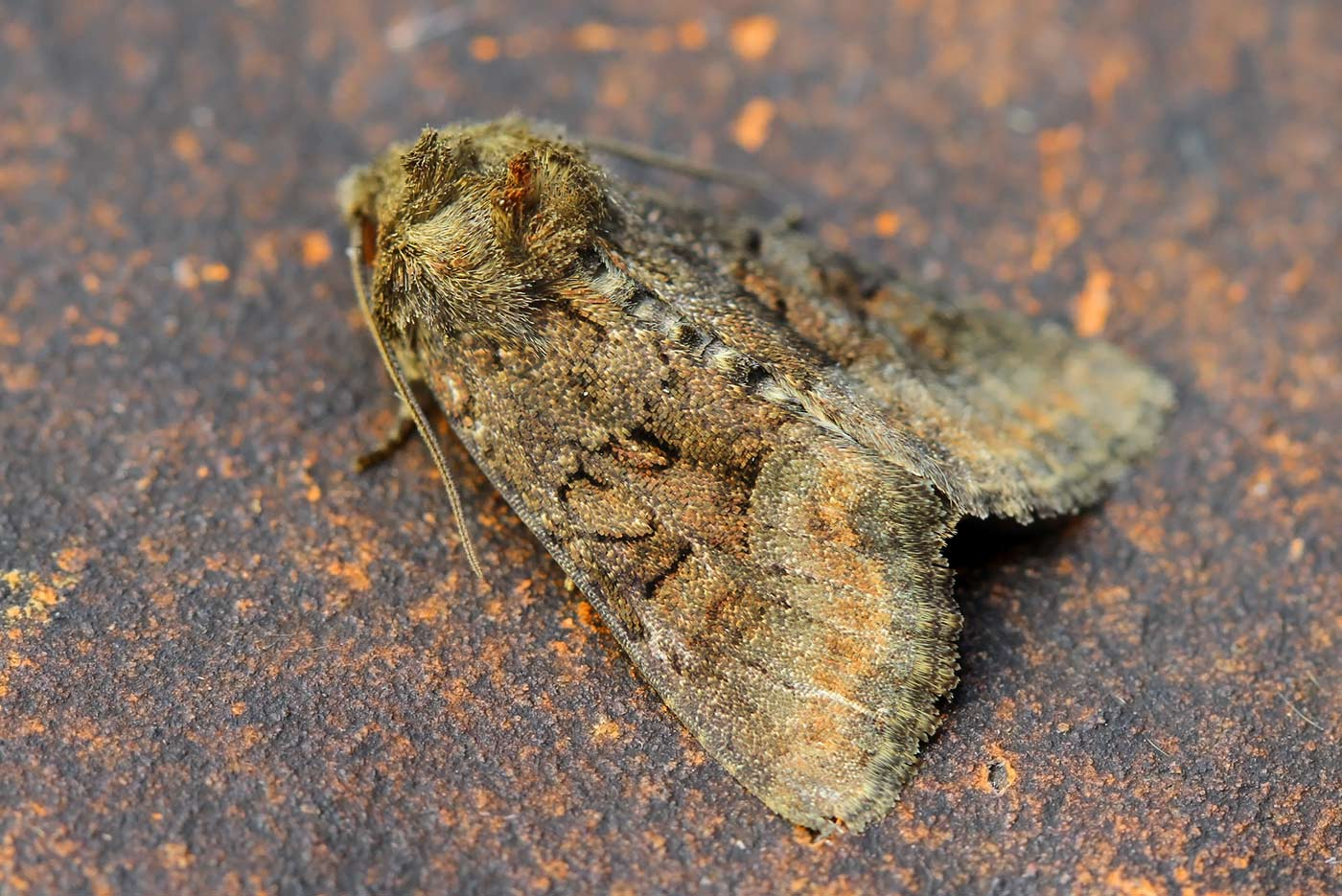

Scientific classification
- Domain: Eukaryota
- Kingdom: Animalia
- Phylum: Arthropoda
- Class: Insecta
- Order: Lepidoptera
- Superfamily: Noctuoidea
- Family: Noctuidae
- Genus: Oligia
- Species: O. versicolor

Binomial name
- Oligia versicolor (Borkhausen, 1792)

= Oligia versicolor =

Rufous minor

Species of moth

Oligia versicolor, the rufous minor, is a species of moth belonging to the family Noctuidae. The species was first described by Moritz Balthasar Borkhausen in 1792. It is distributed throughout Europe from Bulgaria up to the Caucasus in the south. In the north, it is found in southern Scotland, southern Sweden and Estonia through Europe to central Spain, southern Italy.

== Description ==
The wingspan is 24–28 mm. This species is extremely similar to the marbled minor (Oligia strigilis) and the tawny marbled minor (Oligia latruncula) and specific identification usually requires close study of the genitalia. See Townsend et al. for genitalia images and an identification key.O. versicolor has a wingspan of 23–28 mm and often has more brightly coloured forewings than its congeners with rich reddish-brown tones and a grey subterminal band. There is also often one or more tufts of reddish hairs on the thorax, always lacking in its congeners. Although melanism occurs in this species it is much less frequent than in the other two species.

== Biology ==
O. versicolor flies at night in June and July and is attracted to light and sugar. It prefers moist areas. These include, for example, meadows, moors, wet heath and fen, woodland areas, sometimes sandy soils, but not strongly xerothermic habitats.

The larva feeds internally on the stems of various grasses (including Carex species, Luzula luzoloides, Bracilypodium sylvaticum and Poa pratensis), pupating in a cocoon among the roots. This species overwinters as a larva.

1. The flight season refers to the British Isles. This may vary in other parts of the range.
