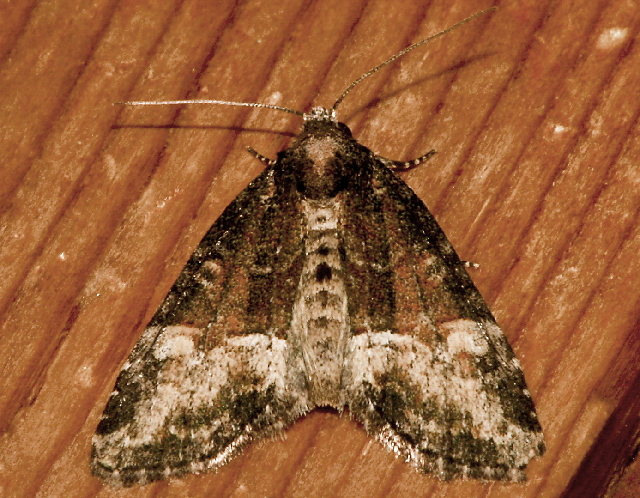

Scientific classification
- Domain: Eukaryota
- Kingdom: Animalia
- Phylum: Arthropoda
- Class: Insecta
- Order: Lepidoptera
- Superfamily: Noctuoidea
- Family: Noctuidae
- Tribe: Apameini
- Genus: Neoligia
- Species: N. subjuncta

Binomial name
- Neoligia subjuncta (Smith, 1898)

Synonyms
- Neoligia laevigata (Smith, 1898)

= Neoligia subjuncta =

Species of moth

Neoligia subjuncta is a species of cutworm or dart moth in the family Noctuidae. It is found in North America.

The MONA or Hodges number for Neoligia subjuncta is 9412.
