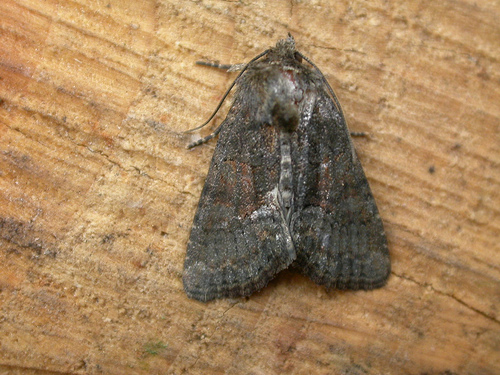

Scientific classification
- Kingdom: Animalia
- Phylum: Arthropoda
- Clade: Pancrustacea
- Class: Insecta
- Order: Lepidoptera
- Superfamily: Noctuoidea
- Family: Noctuidae
- Genus: Oligia
- Species: O. latruncula

Binomial name
- Oligia latruncula (Denis & Schiffermüller, 1775)

= Oligia latruncula =

Tawny marbled minor

Species of moth

Oligia latruncula, the tawny marbled minor, is a species of moth belonging to the family Noctuidae. The species was first described by Michael Denis and Ignaz Schiffermüller in 1775. It is distributed throughout Europe from northern Scotland and middle Fennoscandia in the north and then south to central Spain, Sicily and Greece. In the east, the species ranges to Western Asia. In the Alps it rises to an altitude of 2000 meters.

This species is extremely similar to the marbled minor (Oligia strigilis) and the rufous minor (Oligia versicolor) and specific identification usually requires close study of the genitalia. See Townsend et al. for genitalia images and an identification key. With a wingspan of 24–27 mm, O. latruncula is usually the smallest of the three, although they all overlap in size. Well-marked specimens often have noticeably dark forewings, with a blackish basal area and a coppery brown, rather than whitish, subterminal band. However, melanism is very common in this species and all-dark specimens constitute 100% of the population in some areas. O. latruncula flies at night from May to August and is attracted to light and sugar.

The larva feeds internally on the stems of various grasses including Calamagrostis and Dactylis, pupating in a cocoon among the roots. This species overwinters as a larva.

1. The flight season refers to the British Isles. This may vary in other parts of the range.
