= Mesapamea arbora =

Scientific classification
- Domain: Eukaryota
- Kingdom: Animalia
- Phylum: Arthropoda
- Class: Insecta
- Order: Lepidoptera
- Superfamily: Noctuoidea
- Family: Noctuidae
- Genus: Mesapamea
- Species: M. arbora

Binomial name
- Mesapamea arbora (Barnes & McDunnough, 1912)

Synonyms
- Mesapamea mactatoides (Barnes & McDunnough, 1912)

Species of moth

Mesapamea arbora is a species of cutworm or dart moth in the family Noctuidae first described by William Barnes and James Halliday McDunnough in 1912. It is found in North America.

The MONA or Hodges number for Mesapamea arbora is 9407.
