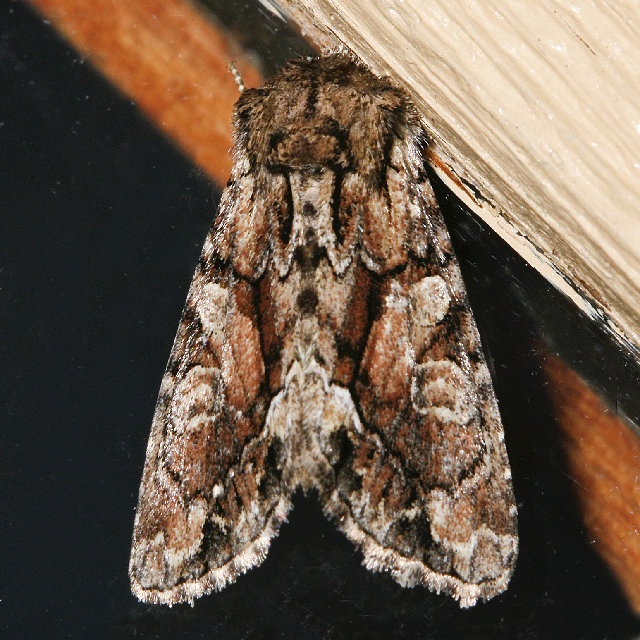

Scientific classification
- Kingdom: Animalia
- Phylum: Arthropoda
- Clade: Pancrustacea
- Class: Insecta
- Order: Lepidoptera
- Superfamily: Noctuoidea
- Family: Noctuidae
- Genus: Oligia
- Species: O. divesta

Binomial name
- Oligia divesta (Grote, 1874)

= Oligia divesta =

Species of moth

Oligia divesta is a species of cutworm or dart moth in the family Noctuidae. It is found in North America.
