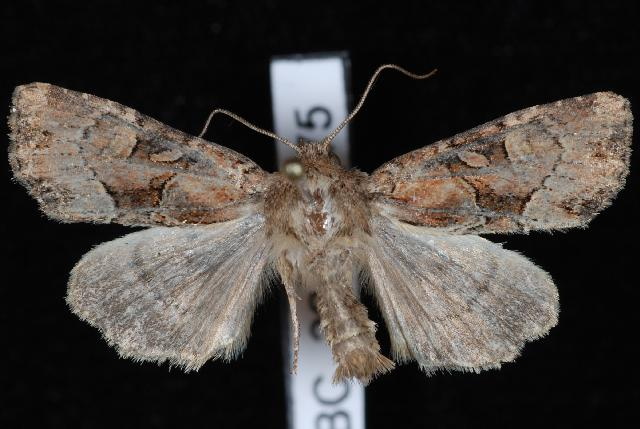

Scientific classification
- Kingdom: Animalia
- Phylum: Arthropoda
- Class: Insecta
- Order: Lepidoptera
- Superfamily: Noctuoidea
- Family: Noctuidae
- Genus: Xylomoia
- Species: X. indirecta

Binomial name
- Xylomoia indirecta (Grote, 1875)

= Xylomoia indirecta =

Species of moth

Xylomoia indirecta, the oblique brocade moth, is a species of cutworm or dart moth in the family Noctuidae.

The MONA or Hodges number for Xylomoia indirecta is 9401.
