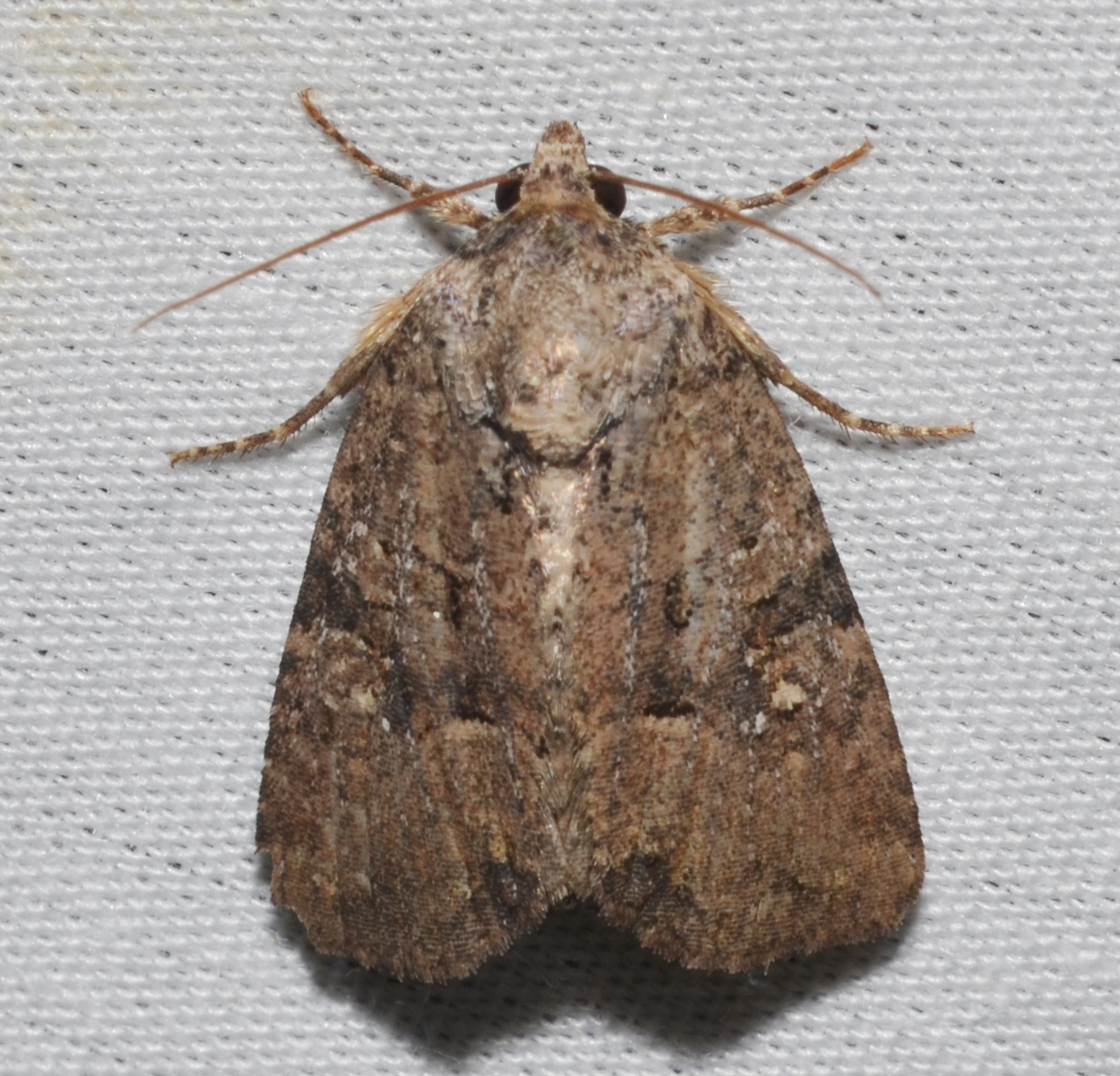

Scientific classification
- Domain: Eukaryota
- Kingdom: Animalia
- Phylum: Arthropoda
- Class: Insecta
- Order: Lepidoptera
- Superfamily: Noctuoidea
- Family: Noctuidae
- Genus: Mesapamea
- Species: M. fractilinea

Binomial name
- Mesapamea fractilinea (Grote, 1874)

= Mesapamea fractilinea =

Species of moth

Mesapamea fractilinea, the broken-lined brocade, is a species of cutworm or dart moth in the family Noctuidae.

The MONA or Hodges number for Mesapamea fractilinea is 9406.
