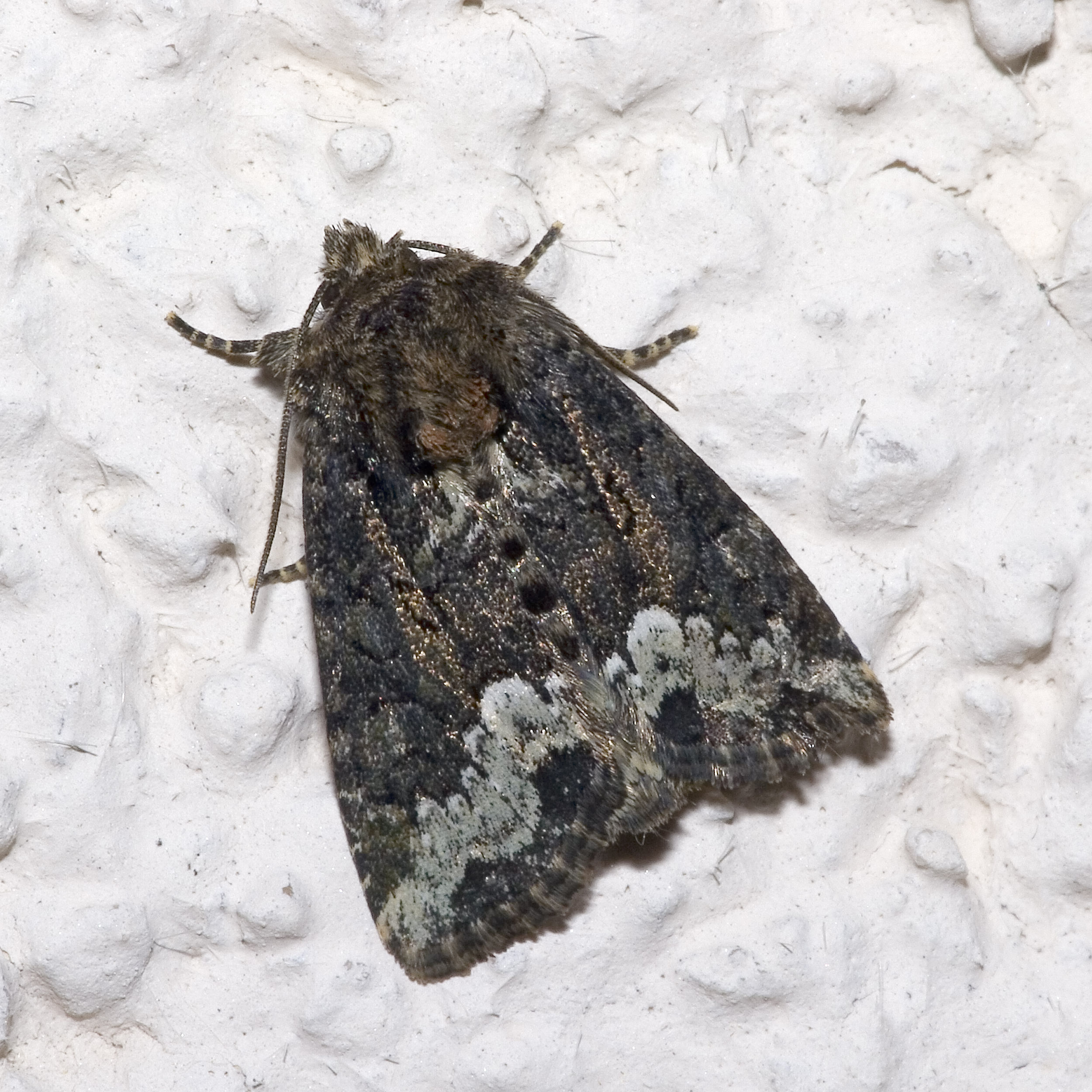

Scientific classification
- Kingdom: Animalia
- Phylum: Arthropoda
- Clade: Pancrustacea
- Class: Insecta
- Order: Lepidoptera
- Superfamily: Noctuoidea
- Family: Noctuidae
- Genus: Oligia
- Species: O. strigilis

Binomial name
- Oligia strigilis (Linnaeus, 1758)

= Marbled minor =

Species of moth

The marbled minor (Oligia strigilis) is a moth of the family Noctuidae. The species was first described by Carl Linnaeus in his 1758 10th edition of Systema Naturae. It is distributed throughout Europe, east through the Palearctic to central Asia and the Altai Mountains. It rises to heights of over 1500 meters in the Alps.

This is a rather small species (wingspan 24–29 mm), the forewings usually being dark brown with a pale subterminal band, the hindwings pale brown. Melanic forms are often encountered, especially in industrial areas.

== Technical description and variation ==
Its wingspan is 24–29 mm. Forewing brownish grey, reddish grey, reddish brown, or blackish; the space between outer and submarginal lines often white or grey, or luteous (muddy yellow), rufous or concolorous with ground colour; the three stigmata ringed with black, either paler than the ground or lost in the dark suffusion; inner and outer lines blackish, conversely edged with paler and dentatelunulate, the pale edging of outer line generally more conspicuous, whitish, below the middle; terminal area dark, forming two blotches one on each fold; a dark costal blotch before submarginal line; a slight black dash from base below cell, and another above inner margin near base; hindwing dark or light fuscous; the type form has the outer band whitish and the ground colour reddish grey or reddish brown.

This species is almost identical to its relatives the rufous minor (O. versicolor) and the tawny marbled minor (O. latruncula) and identification generally requires dissection to study the genitalia. See Townsend et al. for genitalia images and an identification key. This species averages slightly larger than its two cousins but the dimensions of all three species overlap.

== Biology ==
It flies at night from May to July and is attracted to light and sugar.

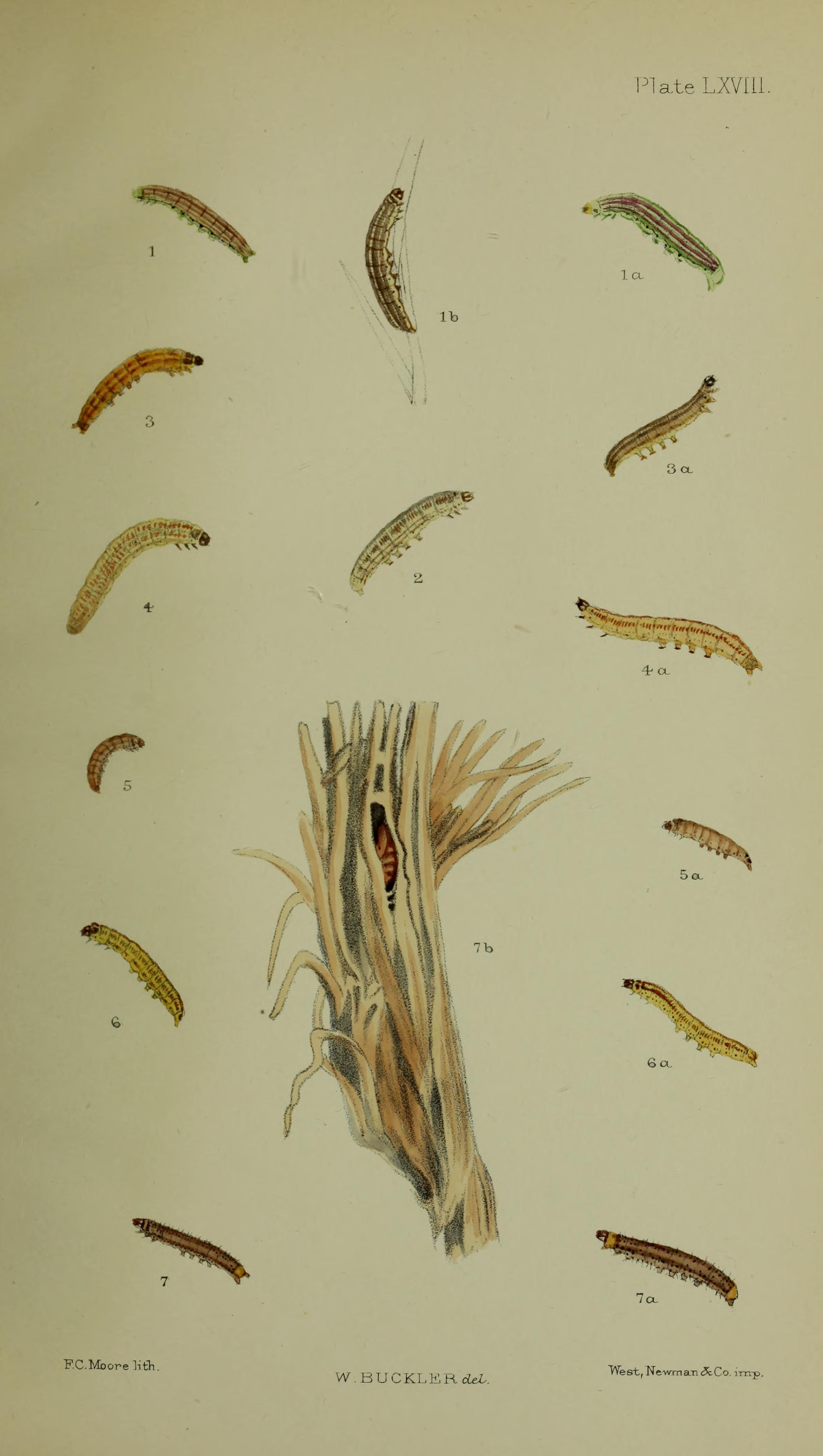
Fig. 1, 1a, 1b larva after last moult

The larva is purplish brown with yellow stripes and feeds internally in various grasses including Agropyron, Dactylis, Elymus (syn. Elytrigia) and Poa. This species overwinters as a larva.

Habitats include, forests, meadows, moors, rocky areas, park-like landscapes, steppe and settlements.

1. The flight season refers to the British Isles. This may vary in other parts of the range.
