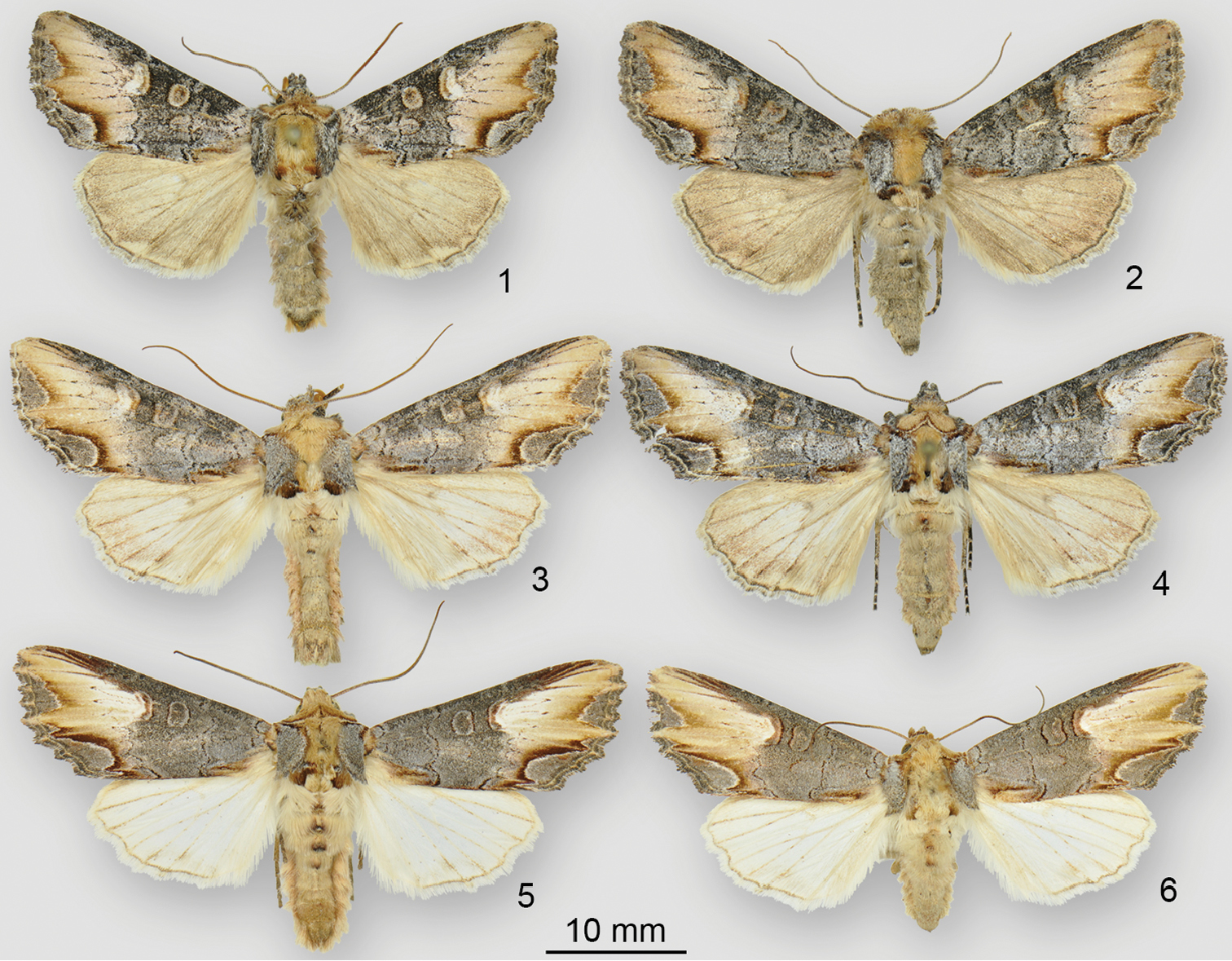

Scientific classification
- Kingdom: Animalia
- Phylum: Arthropoda
- Class: Insecta
- Order: Lepidoptera
- Superfamily: Noctuoidea
- Family: Noctuidae
- Tribe: Orthosiini
- Genus: Admetovis; Grote, 1873

= Admetovis =

Genus of moths

Admetovis is a genus of moths of the family Noctuidae.

== Species ==
- Admetovis oxymorus Grote, 1873
- Admetovis similaris Barnes, 1904
- Admetovis icarus Crabo, 2018
