= Perigonica fulminans =

Scientific classification
- Domain: Eukaryota
- Kingdom: Animalia
- Phylum: Arthropoda
- Class: Insecta
- Order: Lepidoptera
- Superfamily: Noctuoidea
- Family: Noctuidae
- Tribe: Orthosiini
- Genus: Perigonica
- Species: P. fulminans

Binomial name
- Perigonica fulminans Smith, 1890

Species of moth

Perigonica fulminans is a species of cutworm or dart moth in the family Noctuidae. It is found in North America.

The MONA or Hodges number for Perigonica fulminans is 10466.
