= Panolis estheri =

Scientific classification
- Domain: Eukaryota
- Kingdom: Animalia
- Phylum: Arthropoda
- Class: Insecta
- Order: Lepidoptera
- Superfamily: Noctuoidea
- Family: Noctuidae
- Genus: Panolis
- Species: P. estheri

Binomial name
- Panolis estheri Ronkay et al., 2010

Species of moth

Panolis estheri is a species of moth in the family Noctuidae found in China. It is quite similar to Panolis flammea and Panolis japonica.

== Distribution and ecology ==
All specimens have been collected in the Tsinling Mountains. Three females on the Taibaishan Mountain, one female in the Foping County, and three males in the Houzhenzi village. All specimens were caught at an altitude ranging from 1,400–1,500 metres (4,590–4,920 ft). However, the majority were caught at 1,500 metres (4,920 ft). They come in one generation a year (univoltine) in the spring (like all other Panolis species) and they fly from February–March.

== Etymology ==
The specific epithet "estheri" is a tribute to Eszter Illéssy, wife of one of the authors' friends Gábor Pitter.
