= Perigonica angulata =

Scientific classification
- Kingdom: Animalia
- Phylum: Arthropoda
- Class: Insecta
- Order: Lepidoptera
- Superfamily: Noctuoidea
- Family: Noctuidae
- Tribe: Orthosiini
- Genus: Perigonica
- Species: P. angulata

Binomial name
- Perigonica angulata Smith, 1890

Species of moth

Perigonica angulata is a species of cutworm or dart moth in the family Noctuidae. It is found in North America.

The MONA or Hodges number for Perigonica angulata is 10468.
