= Stretchia pictipennis =

Scientific classification
- Domain: Eukaryota
- Kingdom: Animalia
- Phylum: Arthropoda
- Class: Insecta
- Order: Lepidoptera
- Superfamily: Noctuoidea
- Family: Noctuidae
- Tribe: Orthosiini
- Genus: Stretchia
- Species: S. pictipennis

Binomial name
- Stretchia pictipennis McDunnough, 1949

Species of moth

Stretchia pictipennis is a species of cutworm or dart moth in the family Noctuidae. It is found in North America.

The MONA or Hodges number for Stretchia pictipennis is 10472.
