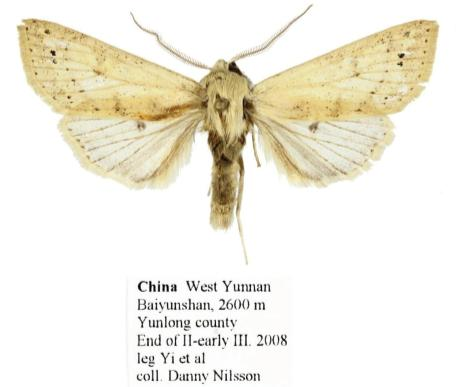
- Male
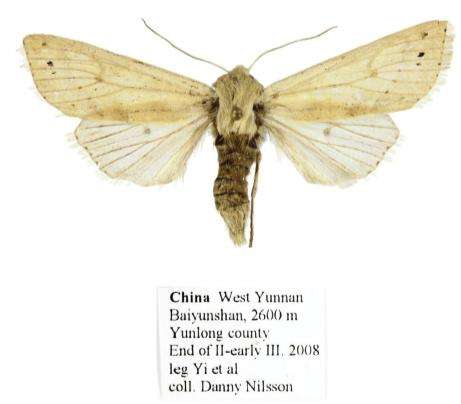
- Female

Scientific classification
- Kingdom: Animalia
- Phylum: Arthropoda
- Clade: Pancrustacea
- Class: Insecta
- Order: Lepidoptera
- Superfamily: Noctuoidea
- Family: Noctuidae
- Genus: Harutaeographa
- Species: H. monimalis

Binomial name
- Harutaeographa monimalis (Draudt, 1950)

Synonyms
- Leucania monimalis Draudt, 1950

= Harutaeographa monimalis =

Species of moth

Harutaeographa monimalis is a moth of the family Noctuidae. It is found in China (Yunnan).
