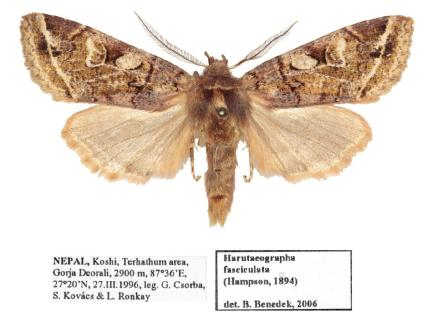
- Male
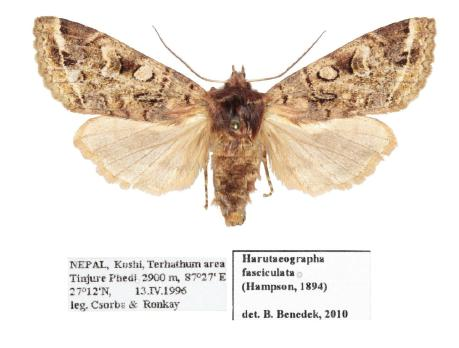
- Female

Scientific classification
- Kingdom: Animalia
- Phylum: Arthropoda
- Clade: Pancrustacea
- Class: Insecta
- Order: Lepidoptera
- Superfamily: Noctuoidea
- Family: Noctuidae
- Genus: Harutaeographa
- Species: H. fasciculata

Binomial name
- Harutaeographa fasciculata (Hampson, 1894)

Synonyms
- Hadena fasciculata Hampson, 1894; Harutaeographa fusciculata nec Hampson, 1894

= Harutaeographa fasciculata =

Species of moth

Harutaeographa fasciculata is a moth of the family Noctuidae. It is found in the Himalaya: Sikkim, northern India, Nepal and northern Vietnam (the Fansipan Mountains).
