= Harutaeographa stangelmaieri =

Scientific classification
- Kingdom: Animalia
- Phylum: Arthropoda
- Clade: Pancrustacea
- Class: Insecta
- Order: Lepidoptera
- Superfamily: Noctuoidea
- Family: Noctuidae
- Genus: Harutaeographa
- Species: H. stangelmaieri

Binomial name
- Harutaeographa stangelmaieri Ronkay, Ronkay, Gyulai & Hacker, 2010

Species of moth

Harutaeographa stangelmaieri is a moth of the family Noctuidae. It is found in China (the Daxue Shan Mountains in Yunnan).
