= Admetovis oxymorus =

Scientific classification
- Kingdom: Animalia
- Phylum: Arthropoda
- Class: Insecta
- Order: Lepidoptera
- Superfamily: Noctuoidea
- Family: Noctuidae
- Genus: Admetovis
- Species: A. oxymorus

Binomial name
- Admetovis oxymorus Grote, 1873

Species of moth

Admetovis oxymorus is a species of cutworm or dart moth in the family Noctuidae. It is found in North America.

The MONA or Hodges number for Admetovis oxymorus is 10269.
