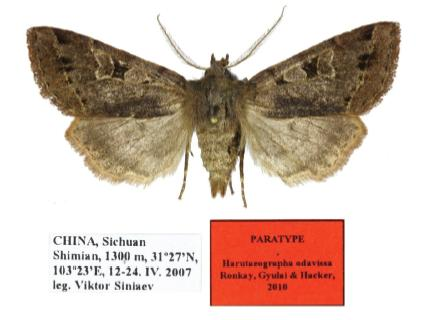
- Male
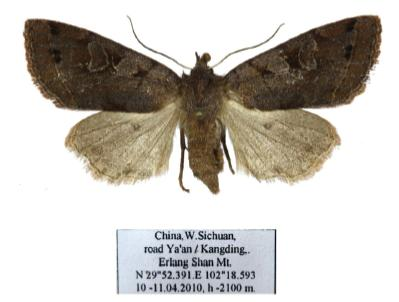
- Female

Scientific classification
- Domain: Eukaryota
- Kingdom: Animalia
- Phylum: Arthropoda
- Class: Insecta
- Order: Lepidoptera
- Superfamily: Noctuoidea
- Family: Noctuidae
- Genus: Harutaeographa
- Species: H. odavissa

Binomial name
- Harutaeographa odavissa Ronkay, Ronkay, Gyulai & Hacker, 2010

= Harutaeographa odavissa =

Species of moth

Harutaeographa odavissa is a moth of the family Noctuidae. It is found in China (Shaanxi: Taibaishan, Tsinling Mts., Hubei: Daba Shan, Sichuan: Daxue Shan, Gongga Shan, Volong Reserve, Siguliang Shan, Qingcheng Shan).
