= Harutaeographa loeffleri =

Scientific classification
- Kingdom: Animalia
- Phylum: Arthropoda
- Clade: Pancrustacea
- Class: Insecta
- Order: Lepidoptera
- Superfamily: Noctuoidea
- Family: Noctuidae
- Genus: Harutaeographa
- Species: H. loeffleri

Binomial name
- Harutaeographa loeffleri Ronkay, Ronkay, Gyulai & Hacker, 2010

Species of moth

Harutaeographa loeffleri is a moth of the family Noctuidae. It is found in Myanmar.
