= Harutaeographa craspedophora =

Scientific classification
- Kingdom: Animalia
- Phylum: Arthropoda
- Clade: Pancrustacea
- Class: Insecta
- Order: Lepidoptera
- Superfamily: Noctuoidea
- Family: Noctuidae
- Genus: Harutaeographa
- Species: H. craspedophora

Binomial name
- Harutaeographa craspedophora (Boursin, 1969)

Synonyms
- Perigrapha craspedophora Boursin, 1969

Species of moth

Harutaeographa craspedophora is a moth of the family Noctuidae. It is found in the Paghman Mountains of Afghanistan.
