= Xylopolia bella =

Scientific classification
- Kingdom: Animalia
- Phylum: Arthropoda
- Clade: Pancrustacea
- Class: Insecta
- Order: Lepidoptera
- Superfamily: Noctuoidea
- Family: Noctuidae
- Genus: Xylopolia
- Species: X. bella

Binomial name
- Xylopolia bella (Butler, 1881)

Synonyms
- Xylomyges bella Butler, 1881; Polia abikonis Matsumura, 1926; Egia bella amamiemsis Kishida & Yoshimoto, 1980

Species of moth

Xylopolia bella is a moth of the family Noctuidae. It is found in China, Korea, Japan (Honshu, Shikoku, and Kyushu; the Amami Islands), and Taiwan.

The wingspan is 38–45 mm.

== Subspecies ==
There are five subspecies:

- Xylopolia bella bella
- Xylopolia bella amamiensia (Kishida & Yoshimoto, 1980)
- Xylopolia bella koreana Kononenko & Ronkay, 1995
- Xylopolia bella taiwanicola Hreblay & Ronkay, 2000 – Taiwan
- Xylopolia bella bellaetani Ronkay, Ronkay, Gyulai & Hacker, 2010 – China (Fujian, Jiangxi)
