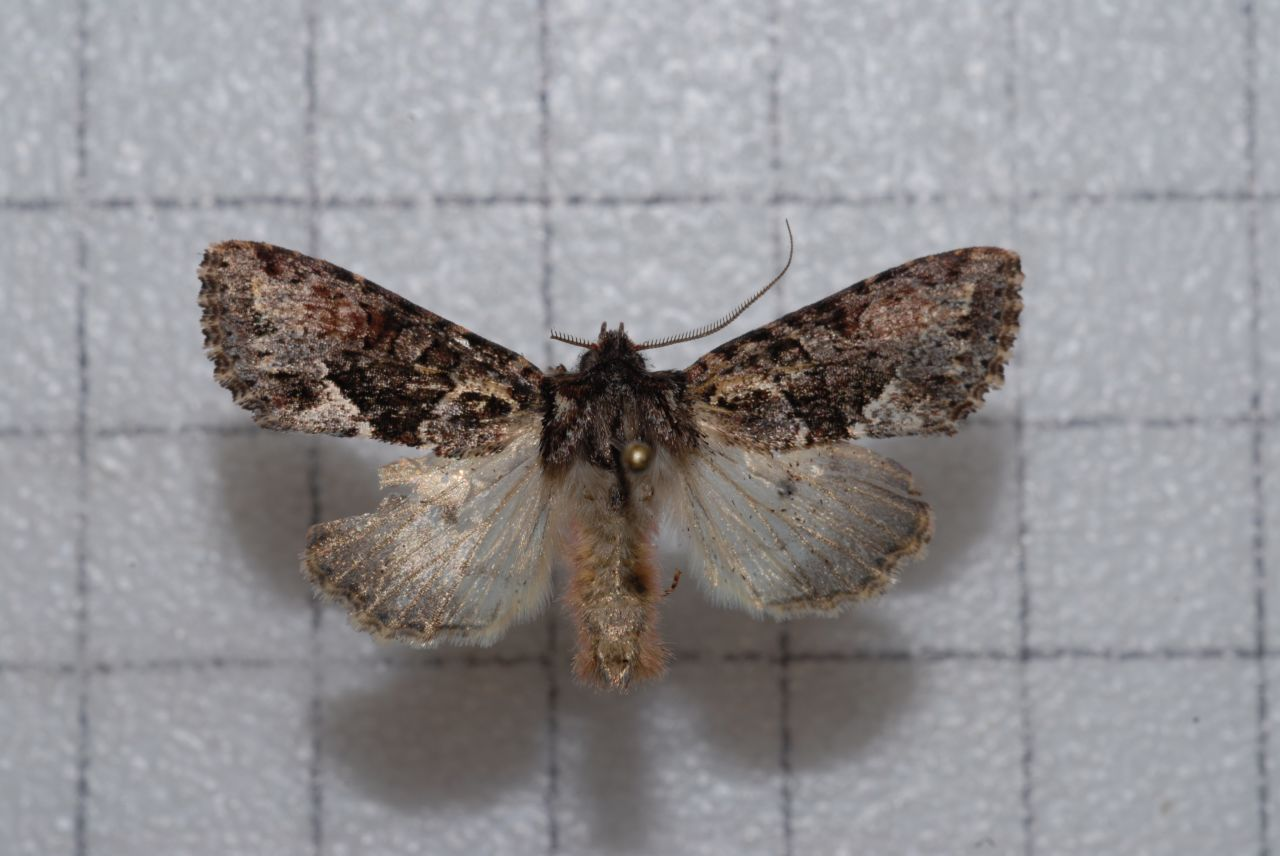

Scientific classification
- Kingdom: Animalia
- Phylum: Arthropoda
- Class: Insecta
- Order: Lepidoptera
- Superfamily: Noctuoidea
- Family: Noctuidae
- Genus: Xylopolia
- Species: X. fulvireniforma

Binomial name
- Xylopolia fulvireniforma Chang, 1991

= Xylopolia fulvireniforma =

Species of moth

Xylopolia fulvireniforma is a species of moth of the family Noctuidae. It is found in Taiwan.
