= Harutaeographa maria =

Scientific classification
- Kingdom: Animalia
- Phylum: Arthropoda
- Clade: Pancrustacea
- Class: Insecta
- Order: Lepidoptera
- Superfamily: Noctuoidea
- Family: Noctuidae
- Genus: Harutaeographa
- Species: H. maria

Binomial name
- Harutaeographa maria Hreblay & Ronkay, 1999

Species of moth

Harutaeographa maria is a moth of the family Noctuidae. It is found in Pakistan (Jammu, Kashmir and Karakorum).
