= Harutaeographa ganeshi =

Scientific classification
- Kingdom: Animalia
- Phylum: Arthropoda
- Clade: Pancrustacea
- Class: Insecta
- Order: Lepidoptera
- Superfamily: Noctuoidea
- Family: Noctuidae
- Genus: Harutaeographa
- Species: H. ganeshi

Binomial name
- Harutaeographa ganeshi Hreblay & Ronkay, 1998

Species of moth

Harutaeographa ganeshi is a moth of the family Noctuidae. It is found in Nepal (Ganesh Himal, Gholjong).
