= Morrisonia triangula =

Scientific classification
- Kingdom: Animalia
- Phylum: Arthropoda
- Clade: Pancrustacea
- Class: Insecta
- Order: Lepidoptera
- Superfamily: Noctuoidea
- Family: Noctuidae
- Genus: Morrisonia
- Species: M. triangula

Binomial name
- Morrisonia triangula Sullivan & Adam, 2009

Species of moth

Morrisonia triangula is a moth of the family Noctuidae. It is found in the south-eastern United States.

== Name ==
Morrisonia triangula Sullivan & Adam, 2009
Type locality: USA, North Carolina, Craven Co., Croatan National Forest, Road 169.
Holotype: USNM. male. 2.IV.2000. J.B. Sullivan.
