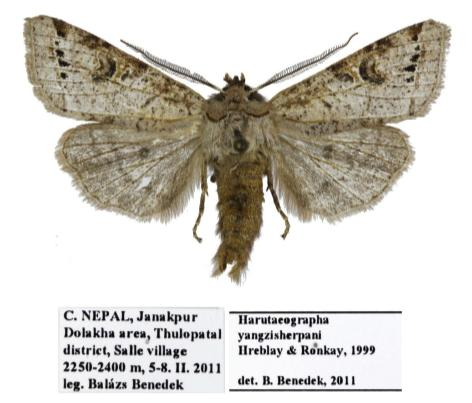

Scientific classification
- Kingdom: Animalia
- Phylum: Arthropoda
- Clade: Pancrustacea
- Class: Insecta
- Order: Lepidoptera
- Superfamily: Noctuoidea
- Family: Noctuidae
- Genus: Harutaeographa
- Species: H. yangzisherpani

Binomial name
- Harutaeographa yangzisherpani Hreblay & Ronkay, 1999

Synonyms
- Harutaeographa yangzisherpani transformis Hreblay & Ronkay, 1999

= Harutaeographa yangzisherpani =

Species of moth

Harutaeographa yangzisherpani is a moth of the family Noctuidae. It is found in Nepal and northern Vietnam.
