= Dioszeghyana =

Scientific classification
- Kingdom: Animalia
- Phylum: Arthropoda
- Clade: Pancrustacea
- Class: Insecta
- Order: Lepidoptera
- Superfamily: Noctuoidea
- Family: Noctuidae
- Tribe: Orthosiini
- Genus: Dioszeghyana; Hreblay, 1993

Genus of moths

Dioszeghyana is a moth genus in the family Noctuidae.

== Species ==
- Dioszeghyana mirabilis (Sugi, 1955)
- Dioszeghyana nigrialba (Yoshimoto, 1993)
- Dioszeghyana schmidtii (Diószeghy, 1935)
