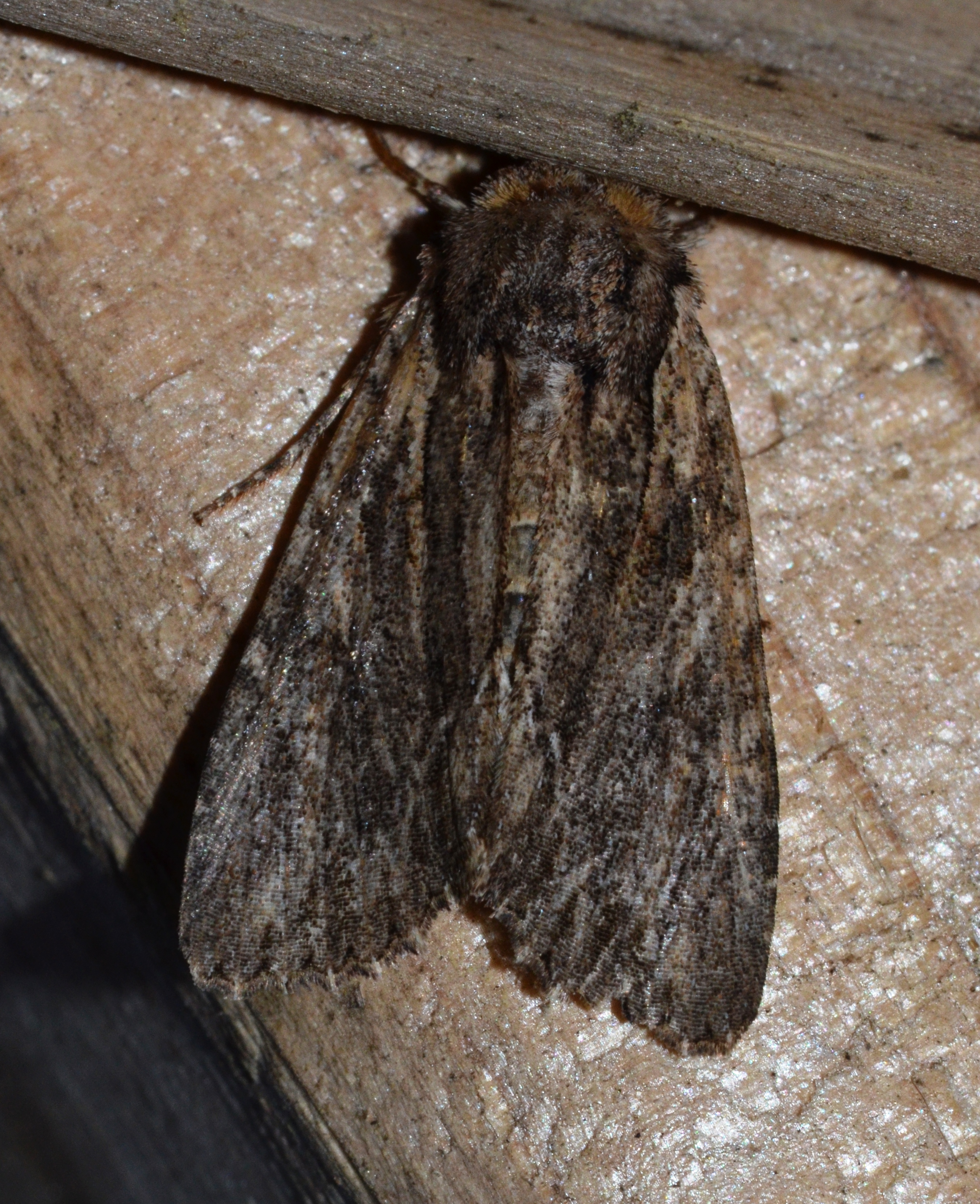

Scientific classification
- Kingdom: Animalia
- Phylum: Arthropoda
- Clade: Pancrustacea
- Class: Insecta
- Order: Lepidoptera
- Superfamily: Noctuoidea
- Family: Noctuidae
- Genus: Morrisonia
- Species: M. confusa

Binomial name
- Morrisonia confusa Hübner, 1831

Synonyms
- Auchmis confusa; Xylina infructuosa

= Morrisonia confusa =

Species of moth

Morrisonia confusa (the confused woodgrain) is a moth of the family Noctuidae. It is found in Eastern North America down to Florida, in the north it can be found up to Nova Scotia, New Brunswick, Quebec and Ontario.

The wingspan is about 35 mm. The moth flies from April to June depending on the location.

The larvae feed on various deciduous trees, including basswood, birch, ironwood, oak, poplar, sweet gale, and wild black cherry.

== Gallery ==
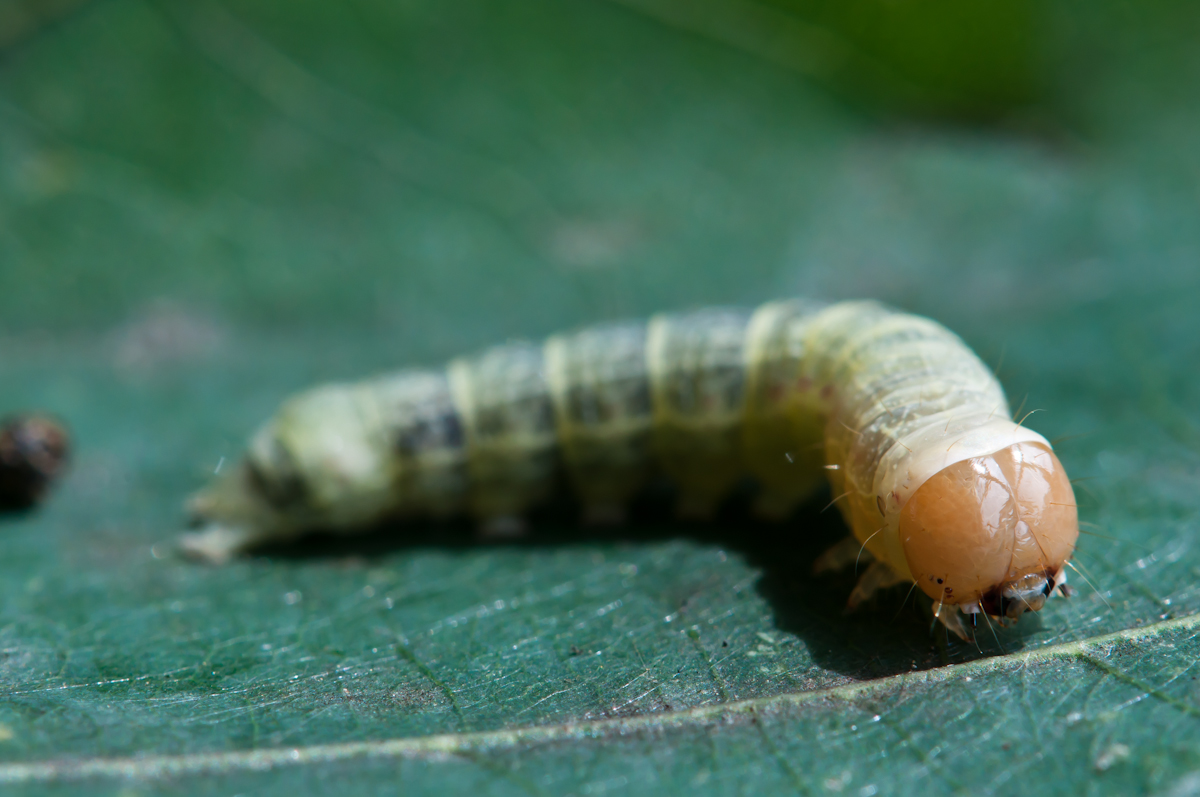
Detailed photograph of Morrisonia confusa head

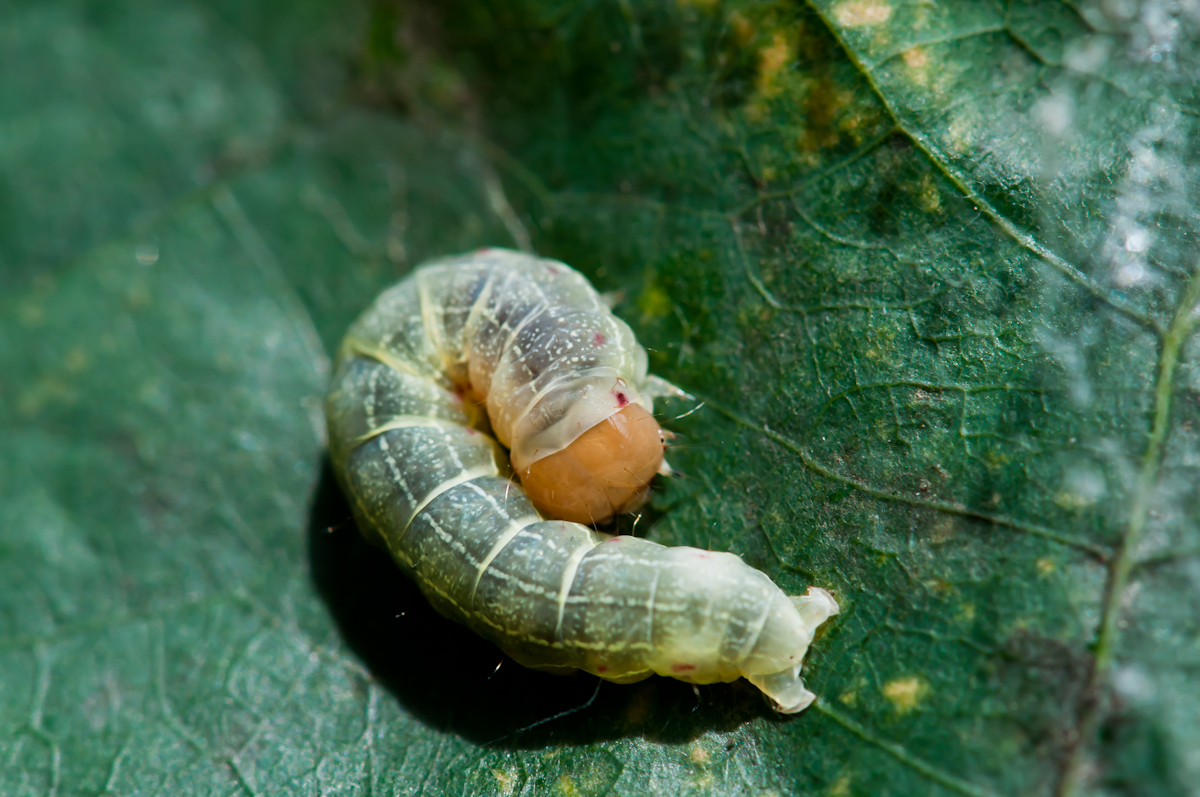
Dorsal photograph of Morrisonia confusa
