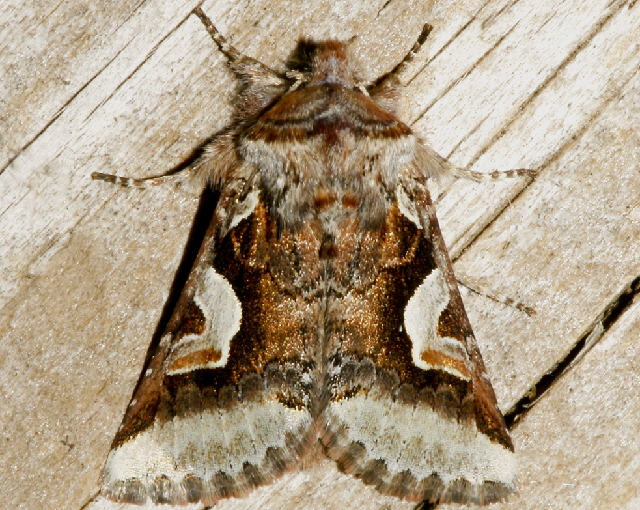

Scientific classification
- Kingdom: Animalia
- Phylum: Arthropoda
- Clade: Pancrustacea
- Class: Insecta
- Order: Lepidoptera
- Superfamily: Noctuoidea
- Family: Noctuidae
- Genus: Stretchia
- Species: S. muricina

Binomial name
- Stretchia muricina (Grote, 1876)

= Stretchia muricina =

Species of moth

Stretchia muricina is a species of moth in the family Noctuidae (owlet moths) first described by Augustus Radcliffe Grote in 1876. It is found in North America.
