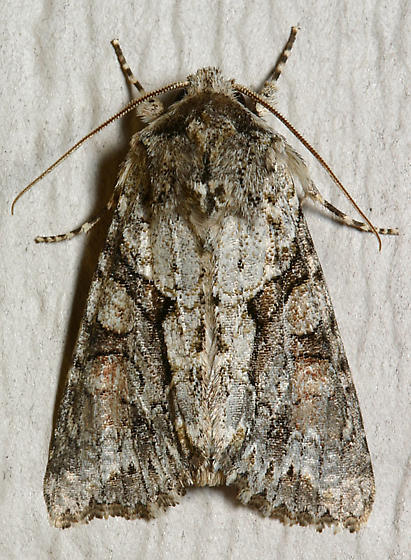
- Achatia distincta

Scientific classification
- Kingdom: Animalia
- Phylum: Arthropoda
- Clade: Pancrustacea
- Class: Insecta
- Order: Lepidoptera
- Superfamily: Noctuoidea
- Family: Noctuidae
- Tribe: Orthosiini
- Genus: Achatia; Hübner, 1813

= Achatia =

Genus of moths

Achatia is a moth genus in the family Noctuidae.

== Species ==
- Achatia confusa Hübner, 1827
- Achatia demissa Walker, 1857
- Achatia distincta Hübner, [1813] – distinct Quaker moth
- Achatia dogmatica Dyar
- Achatia evicta Grote, 1873
- Achatia funebris Köhler, 1947
- Achatia infidelis Grote, 1879
- Achatia infructuosa Walker, 1857
- Achatia latex Guenée, 1852
- Achatia mucens Hübner, 1827
- Achatia multifaria Walker, 1857
- Achatia rileyana Smith, 1890
- Achatia sectilana Strand, 1917
- Achatia sectilis Guenée, 1852
- Achatia spoliata Walker, 1857
- Achatia vitis French, 1879
- Achatia vomerina Grote, 1873
