= Harutaeographa kofka =

Scientific classification
- Kingdom: Animalia
- Phylum: Arthropoda
- Clade: Pancrustacea
- Class: Insecta
- Order: Lepidoptera
- Superfamily: Noctuoidea
- Family: Noctuidae
- Genus: Harutaeographa
- Species: H. kofka

Binomial name
- Harutaeographa kofka Hreblay, 1996

Species of moth

Harutaeographa kofka is a moth of the family Noctuidae. It is found in the Himalaya: Pakistan, northern India and Nepal.
