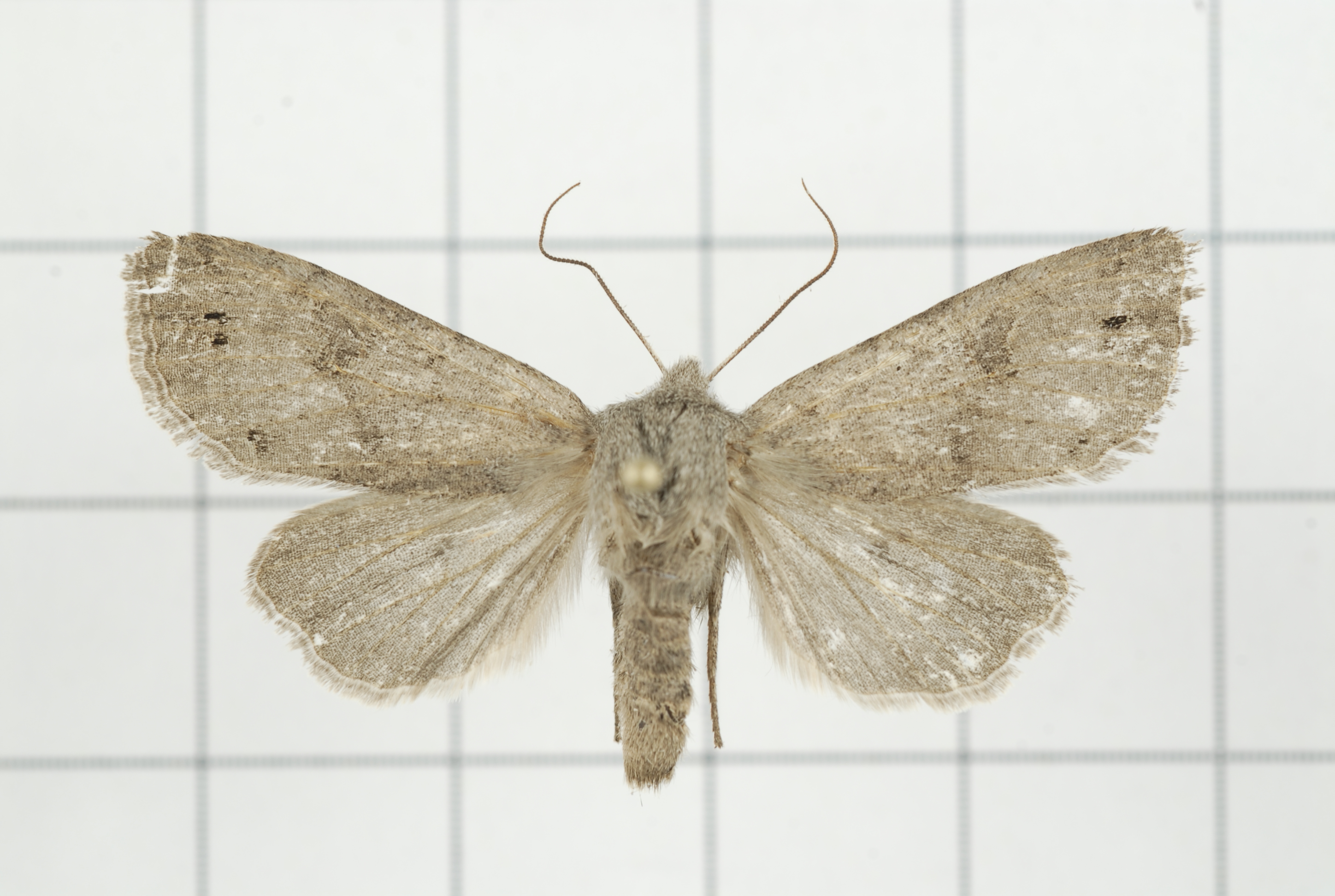
- Anorthoa fabiani

Scientific classification
- Kingdom: Animalia
- Phylum: Arthropoda
- Clade: Pancrustacea
- Class: Insecta
- Order: Lepidoptera
- Superfamily: Noctuoidea
- Family: Noctuidae
- Tribe: Orthosiini
- Genus: Anorthoa; Berio, 1980

= Anorthoa =

Genus of moths

Anorthoa is a moth genus in the family Noctuidae.

== Species ==
- Anorthoa angustipennis (Monima, 1926)
- Anorthoa fabiani (Hreblay & Ronkay, 1998)
- Anorthoa munda – twin-spotted Quaker (Denis & Schiffermüller, 1775)
- Anorthoa rubrocinerea (Hreblay & Ronkay, 1998)
