= Perigonica pectinata =

Scientific classification
- Domain: Eukaryota
- Kingdom: Animalia
- Phylum: Arthropoda
- Class: Insecta
- Order: Lepidoptera
- Superfamily: Noctuoidea
- Family: Noctuidae
- Genus: Perigonica
- Species: P. pectinata

Binomial name
- Perigonica pectinata (Smith, 1888)

Synonyms
- Perigonica johnstoni (McDunnough, 1943)

Species of moth

Perigonica pectinata is a species of cutworm or dart moth in the family Noctuidae. It was described by Smith in 1943 and is found in North America.

The MONA or Hodges number for Perigonica pectinata is 10469.
