= Harutaeographa saba =

Scientific classification
- Kingdom: Animalia
- Phylum: Arthropoda
- Clade: Pancrustacea
- Class: Insecta
- Order: Lepidoptera
- Superfamily: Noctuoidea
- Family: Noctuidae
- Genus: Harutaeographa
- Species: H. saba

Binomial name
- Harutaeographa saba Hreblay & Plante, 1996

Species of moth

Harutaeographa saba is a moth of the family Noctuidae. It is found in Pakistan and Afghanistan.
