= Perigonica =

Scientific classification
- Domain: Eukaryota
- Kingdom: Animalia
- Phylum: Arthropoda
- Class: Insecta
- Order: Lepidoptera
- Superfamily: Noctuoidea
- Family: Noctuidae
- Tribe: Orthosiini
- Genus: Perigonica; Smith, 1890

Genus of moths

Perigonica is a genus of moths of the family Noctuidae.

== Species ==
- Perigonica angulata Smith, 1890
- Perigonica eldana Smith, 1911
- Perigonica fulminans Smith, 1890
- Perigonica pectinata (Smith, 1888) (syn: Perigonica johnstoni (McDunnough, 1943))
- Perigonica tertia Dyar, 1903 (syn: Perigonica fermata Smith, 1911)
