= Harutaeographa eriza =

Scientific classification
- Kingdom: Animalia
- Phylum: Arthropoda
- Clade: Pancrustacea
- Class: Insecta
- Order: Lepidoptera
- Superfamily: Noctuoidea
- Family: Noctuidae
- Genus: Harutaeographa
- Species: H. eriza

Binomial name
- Harutaeographa eriza (Swinhoe, 1901)

Synonyms
- Semiophora eriza Swinhoe, 1901; Orthosia eriza

Species of moth

Harutaeographa eriza is a moth of the family Noctuidae. It is found in the Himalaya, Pakistan and India (Punjab).
