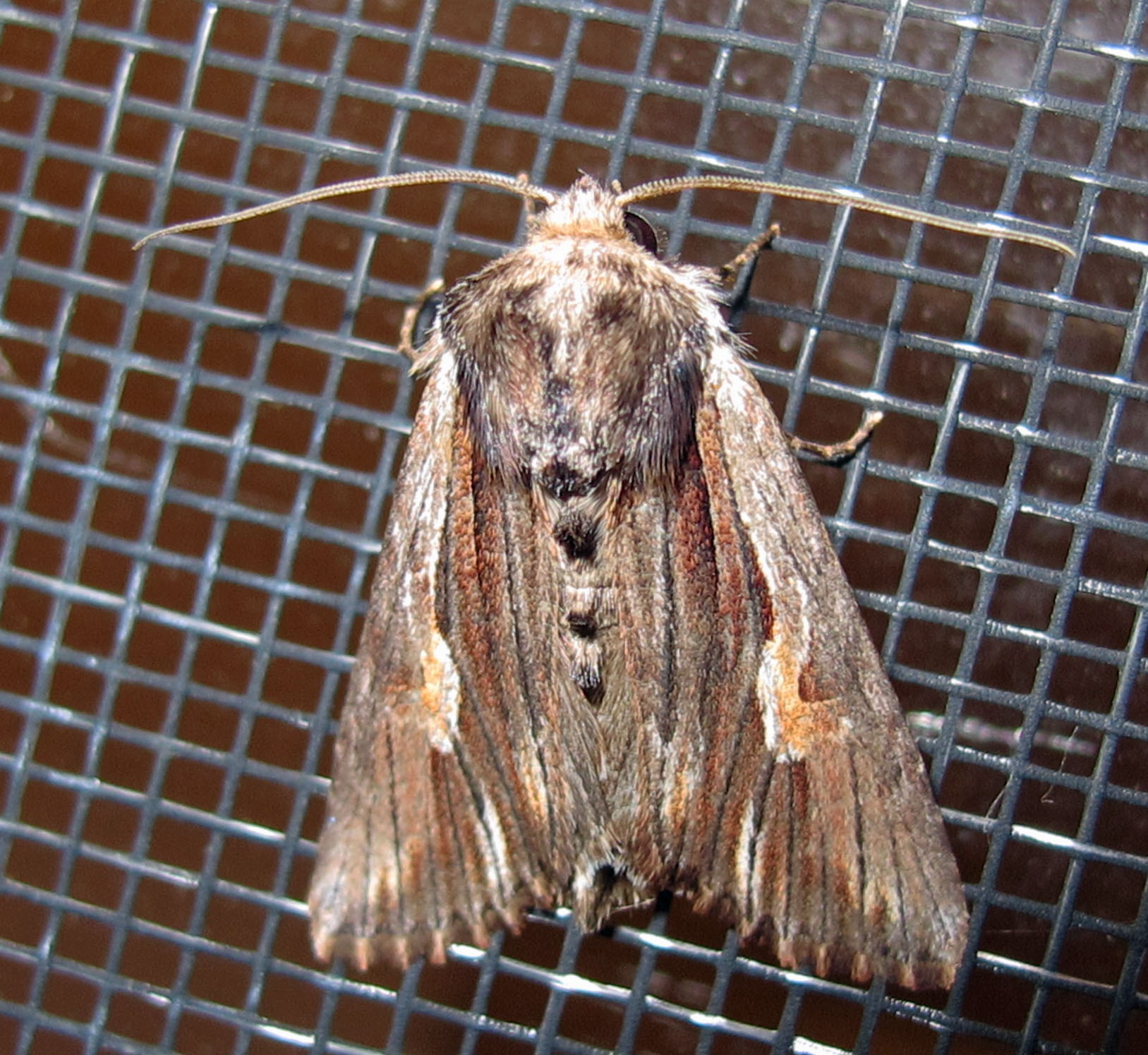

Scientific classification
- Kingdom: Animalia
- Phylum: Arthropoda
- Clade: Pancrustacea
- Class: Insecta
- Order: Lepidoptera
- Superfamily: Noctuoidea
- Family: Noctuidae
- Genus: Morrisonia
- Species: M. evicta

Binomial name
- Morrisonia evicta (Grote, 1873)

Synonyms
- Cloantha evicta Grote, 1873; Cloantha vomerina Grote, 1873; Morrisonia infidelis Grote, 1879

= Morrisonia evicta =

Species of moth

The bicolored woodgrain (Morrisonia evicta) is a species of moth of the family Noctuidae. It is found from Nova Scotia to Virginia, west to Texas and Manitoba.

The wingspan is 30–37 mm. Adults are on wing from April to May.

Larvae have been reared on Prunus virginiana.
