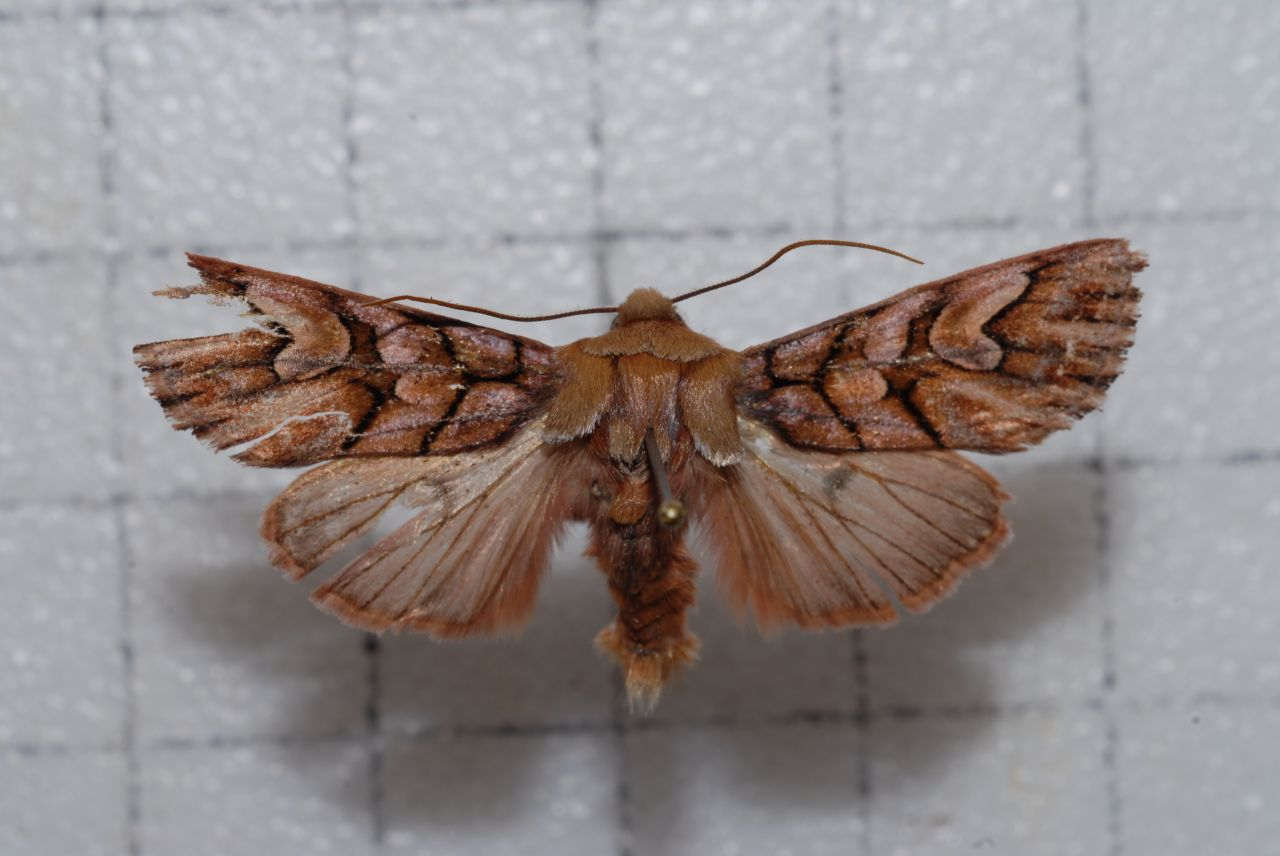

Scientific classification
- Kingdom: Animalia
- Phylum: Arthropoda
- Class: Insecta
- Order: Lepidoptera
- Superfamily: Noctuoidea
- Family: Noctuidae
- Genus: Panolis
- Species: P. variegatoides

Binomial name
- Panolis variegatoides (Poole, 1989)

Synonyms
- Hadena variegatoides Poole, 1989; Hadena variegata Wileman, 1914 (preocc. Hadena abjecta var. variegata Staudinger, 1871)

= Panolis variegatoides =

Species of moth

Panolis variegatoides is a moth of the family Noctuidae. It is found in Taiwan.
