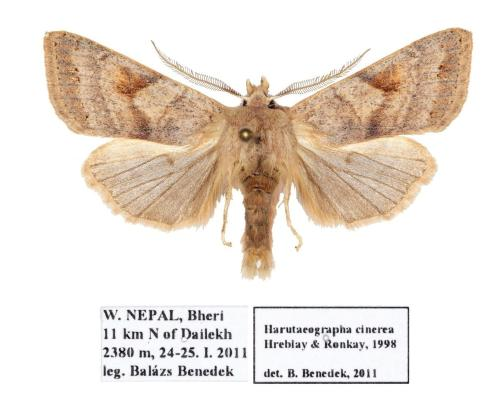
- Harutaeographa cinerea

Scientific classification
- Kingdom: Animalia
- Phylum: Arthropoda
- Clade: Pancrustacea
- Class: Insecta
- Order: Lepidoptera
- Superfamily: Noctuoidea
- Family: Noctuidae
- Subfamily: Noctuinae
- Tribe: Orthosiini
- Genus: Harutaeographa; Yoshimoto, 1993

= Harutaeographa =

Genus of moths

Harutaeographa is a moth genus in the family Noctuidae.

== Species ==
- Harutaeographa adusta Hreblay & Ronkay, 1999
- Harutaeographa akos (Hreblay, 1996)
- Harutaeographa babai (Sugi & Sakurai, 1994)
- Harutaeographa bicolorata Hreblay & Ronkay, 1998
- Harutaeographa bidui (Hreblay & Plante, 1996)
- Harutaeographa brahma Hreblay & Ronkay, 1998
- Harutaeographa brumosa Yoshimoto, 1994
- Harutaeographa caerulea Yoshimoto, 1993
- Harutaeographa castanea Yoshimoto, 1993
- Harutaeographa castaneipennis (Hampson, 1894)
- Harutaeographa cinerea Hreblay & Ronkay, 1998
- Harutaeographa craspedophora (Boursin, 1969)
- Harutaeographa diffusa Yoshimoto, 1994
- Harutaeographa elphinia Hreblay & Ronkay, 1999
- Harutaeographa eriza (Swinhoe, 1901)
- Harutaeographa fasciculata (Hampson, 1894)
- Harutaeographa ferrosticta (Hampson, 1894)
- Harutaeographa ganeshi Hreblay & Ronkay, 1998
- Harutaeographa izabella Hreblay & Ronkay, 1998
- Harutaeographa kofka Hreblay, 1996
- Harutaeographa loeffleri Ronkay, Ronkay, Gyulai & Hacker, 2010
- Harutaeographa maria Hreblay & Ronkay, 1999
- Harutaeographa marpha Hreblay & Ronkay, 1999
- Harutaeographa monimalis (Draudt, 1950)
- Harutaeographa odavissa Ronkay, Ronkay, Gyulai & Hacker, 2010
- Harutaeographa orias Hreblay, 1996
- Harutaeographa pallida Yoshimoto, 1993
- Harutaeographa pinkisherpani Hreblay & Ronkay, 1998
- Harutaeographa rama Hreblay & Plante, 1996
- Harutaeographa rubida (Hampson, 1894)
- Harutaeographa saba Hreblay & Plante, 1996
- Harutaeographa seibaldi Ronkay, Ronkay, Gyulai & Hacker, 2010
- Harutaeographa shui Benedek & Saldaitis, 2012
- Harutaeographa siva Hreblay, 1996
- Harutaeographa stangelmaieri Ronkay, Ronkay, Gyulai & Hacker, 2010
- Harutaeographa stenoptera (Staudinger, 1892)
- Harutaeographa yangzisherpani Hreblay & Ronkay, 1999
