= Harutaeographa castaneipennis =

Scientific classification
- Kingdom: Animalia
- Phylum: Arthropoda
- Clade: Pancrustacea
- Class: Insecta
- Order: Lepidoptera
- Superfamily: Noctuoidea
- Family: Noctuidae
- Genus: Harutaeographa
- Species: H. castaneipennis

Binomial name
- Harutaeographa castaneipennis (Hampson, 1894)

Synonyms
- Semiophora castaneipennis Hampson, 1894; Orthosia castaneipennis

Species of moth

Harutaeographa castaneipennis is a moth of the family Noctuidae. It is found in northern India (Jammu and Kashmir).
