= Harutaeographa caerulea =

Scientific classification
- Kingdom: Animalia
- Phylum: Arthropoda
- Clade: Pancrustacea
- Class: Insecta
- Order: Lepidoptera
- Superfamily: Noctuoidea
- Family: Noctuidae
- Genus: Harutaeographa
- Species: H. caerulea

Binomial name
- Harutaeographa caerulea Yoshimoto, 1993

Species of moth

Harutaeographa caerulea is a moth of the family Noctuidae. It is found in Nepal and Thailand.

== Subspecies ==
- Harutaeographa caerulea caerulea (Nepal: Kathmandu Valley)
- Harutaeographa caerulea rubrigrapha Hreblay & Ronkay, 1999 (Thailand: Chiang Mai)
