= Harutaeographa seibaldi =

Scientific classification
- Kingdom: Animalia
- Phylum: Arthropoda
- Clade: Pancrustacea
- Class: Insecta
- Order: Lepidoptera
- Superfamily: Noctuoidea
- Family: Noctuidae
- Genus: Harutaeographa
- Species: H. seibaldi

Binomial name
- Harutaeographa seibaldi Ronkay, Ronkay, Gyulai & Hacker, 2010

Species of moth

Harutaeographa seibaldi is a moth of the family Noctuidae. It is found in Myanmar.
