= Harutaeographa stenoptera =

Scientific classification
- Kingdom: Animalia
- Phylum: Arthropoda
- Clade: Pancrustacea
- Class: Insecta
- Order: Lepidoptera
- Superfamily: Noctuoidea
- Family: Noctuidae
- Genus: Harutaeographa
- Species: H. stenoptera

Binomial name
- Harutaeographa stenoptera (Staudinger, 1892)

Synonyms
- Taeniocampa stenoptera Staudinger, 1892; Orthosia stenoptera

Species of moth

Harutaeographa stenoptera is a moth of the family Noctuidae. It is found in Russia (south-eastern Siberia, Amur, Ussuri, Primorje), Korea and China (Shaanxi).
