= Harutaeographa orias =

Scientific classification
- Kingdom: Animalia
- Phylum: Arthropoda
- Clade: Pancrustacea
- Class: Insecta
- Order: Lepidoptera
- Superfamily: Noctuoidea
- Family: Noctuidae
- Genus: Harutaeographa
- Species: H. orias

Binomial name
- Harutaeographa orias Hreblay, 1996

Species of moth

Harutaeographa orias is a moth of the family Noctuidae. It is found in Nepal, India, Pakistan, Indochina and Thailand.

== Subspecies ==
- Harutaeographa orias orias (northern India: Sikkim, West Bengal, Darjeeling)
- Harutaeographa orias yoshimotoi Hacker & Hreblay, 1996 (Pakistan: Kashmir, northern India: Himachal Pradesh, Sikkim, Nepal, Indochina, Thailand: Chiang Mai)
