= Perigonica tertia =

Scientific classification
- Kingdom: Animalia
- Phylum: Arthropoda
- Class: Insecta
- Order: Lepidoptera
- Superfamily: Noctuoidea
- Family: Noctuidae
- Genus: Perigonica
- Species: P. tertia

Binomial name
- Perigonica tertia Dyar, 1903

Synonyms
- Perigonica fermata Smith, 1911

Species of moth

Perigonica tertia is a species of cutworm or dart moth in the family Noctuidae. It is found in North America.

The MONA or Hodges number for Perigonica tertia is 10464.
