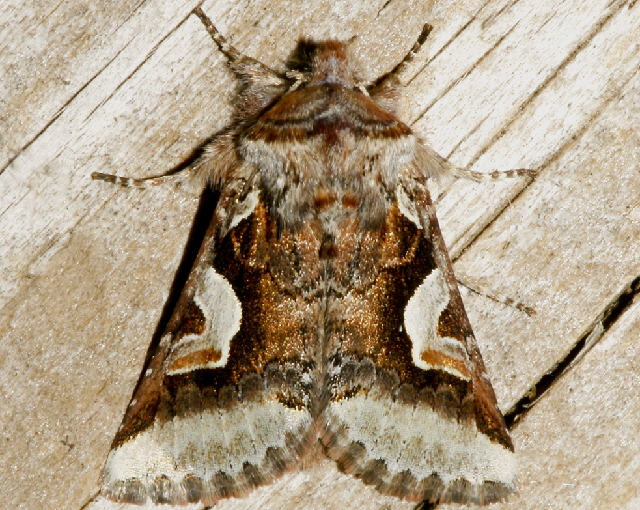
- Stretchia muricina

Scientific classification
- Kingdom: Animalia
- Phylum: Arthropoda
- Clade: Pancrustacea
- Class: Insecta
- Order: Lepidoptera
- Superfamily: Noctuoidea
- Family: Noctuidae
- Tribe: Orthosiini
- Genus: Stretchia; H.Edwards, 1874

= Stretchia =

Genus of moths

Stretchia is a moth genus in the family Noctuidae.

== Species ==
- Stretchia inferior (Smith, 1888)
- Stretchia muricina (Grote, 1876)
- Stretchia pacifica McDunnough, 1949
- Stretchia pictipennis McDunnough, 1949
- Stretchia plusiaeformis H. Edwards, 1874
- Stretchia prima (Smith, 1891)
