= Harutaeographa bidui =

Scientific classification
- Kingdom: Animalia
- Phylum: Arthropoda
- Clade: Pancrustacea
- Class: Insecta
- Order: Lepidoptera
- Superfamily: Noctuoidea
- Family: Noctuidae
- Genus: Harutaeographa
- Species: H. bidui

Binomial name
- Harutaeographa bidui Hreblay & Plante, 1996

Species of moth

Harutaeographa bidui is a moth of the family Noctuidae. It is found in Pakistan.

== Subspecies ==
- Harutaeographa bidui bidui (northern Pakistan)
- Harutaeographa bidui kaghanensis Hreblay & Ronkay, 1999 (Pakistan: Kaghan valley)
