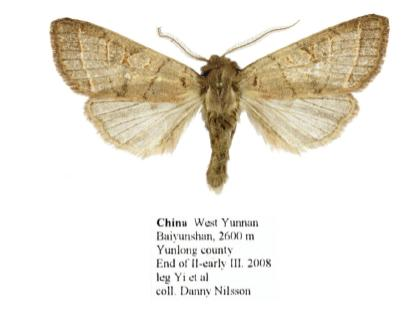

Scientific classification
- Kingdom: Animalia
- Phylum: Arthropoda
- Clade: Pancrustacea
- Class: Insecta
- Order: Lepidoptera
- Superfamily: Noctuoidea
- Family: Noctuidae
- Genus: Harutaeographa
- Species: H. pallida

Binomial name
- Harutaeographa pallida Yoshimoto, 1993

= Harutaeographa pallida =

Species of moth

Harutaeographa pallida is a moth of the family Noctuidae. It is found in Nepal and China (Yunnan).
