= Harutaeographa brumosa =

Scientific classification
- Kingdom: Animalia
- Phylum: Arthropoda
- Clade: Pancrustacea
- Class: Insecta
- Order: Lepidoptera
- Superfamily: Noctuoidea
- Family: Noctuidae
- Genus: Harutaeographa
- Species: H. brumosa

Binomial name
- Harutaeographa brumosa Yoshimoto, 1994

Species of moth

Harutaeographa brumosa is a moth of the family Noctuidae. It is found in Nepal (the Terhathum district).
