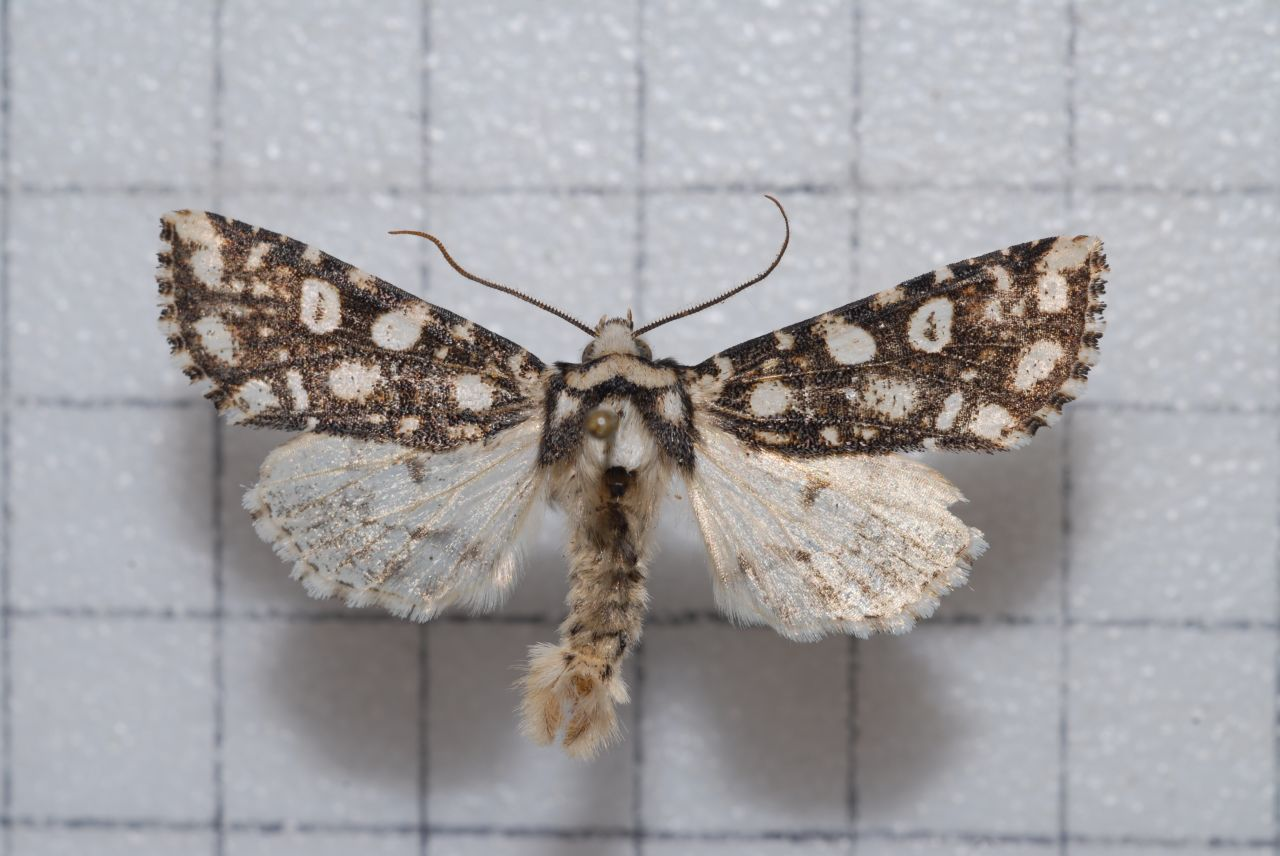

Scientific classification
- Kingdom: Animalia
- Phylum: Arthropoda
- Clade: Pancrustacea
- Class: Insecta
- Order: Lepidoptera
- Superfamily: Noctuoidea
- Family: Noctuidae
- Tribe: Orthosiini
- Genus: Houlberthosia; G. Ronkay, L. Ronkay, P. Gyulai & Hacker, 2010
- Species: H. ornatissima

Binomial name
- Houlberthosia ornatissima (Wileman, 1911)

Synonyms
- Gaurenopsis ornatissima Wileman, 1911; Gaurenopsis insularis Houlbert, 1921; Gaurenopsis conspicua ornatissima

= Houlberthosia =

Genus of moths

Houlberthosia is a genus of moths in the family Noctuidae. It contains only one species, Houlberthosia ornatissima, which is found in Vietnam and Taiwan.

== Subspecies ==
- Houlberthosia ornatissima ornatissima (Taiwan)
- Houlberthosia ornatissima speideli G. Ronkay, L. Ronkay, P. Gyulai & Hacker, 2010 (Vietnam)
