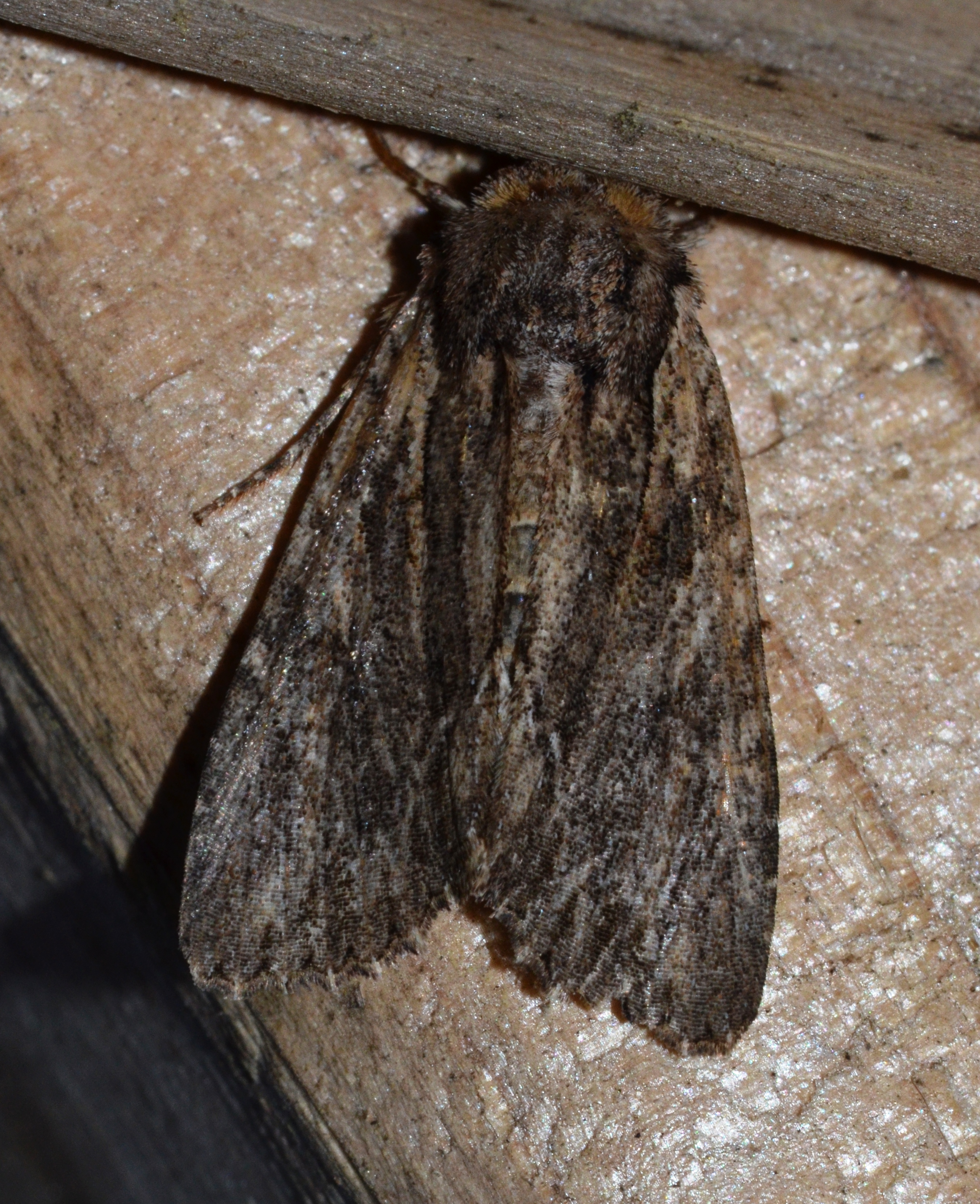
- Morrisonia confusa

Scientific classification
- Kingdom: Animalia
- Phylum: Arthropoda
- Clade: Pancrustacea
- Class: Insecta
- Order: Lepidoptera
- Superfamily: Noctuoidea
- Family: Noctuidae
- Tribe: Orthosiini
- Genus: Morrisonia; Grote, 1874

= Morrisonia =

Genus of moths

Morrisonia is a moth genus in the family Noctuidae.

== Species ==
- Morrisonia confusa - Confused Woodgrain (Hübner, [1831])
- Morrisonia evicta (Grote, 1873)
- Morrisonia latex - Fluid Arches (Guenée, 1852)
- Morrisonia mucens (Hübner, [1831])
- Morrisonia triangula Sullivan & Adam, 2009
