= Harutaeographa ferrosticta =

Scientific classification
- Kingdom: Animalia
- Phylum: Arthropoda
- Clade: Pancrustacea
- Class: Insecta
- Order: Lepidoptera
- Superfamily: Noctuoidea
- Family: Noctuidae
- Genus: Harutaeographa
- Species: H. ferrosticta

Binomial name
- Harutaeographa ferrosticta (Hampson, 1894)

Synonyms
- Semiophora ferrosticta Hampson, 1894; Orthosia ferrosticta

Species of moth

Harutaeographa ferrosticta is a moth of the family Noctuidae. It is found in the Himalaya, Pakistan and northern India (Jammu and Kashmir).
