= Harutaeographa castanea =

Scientific classification
- Kingdom: Animalia
- Phylum: Arthropoda
- Clade: Pancrustacea
- Class: Insecta
- Order: Lepidoptera
- Superfamily: Noctuoidea
- Family: Noctuidae
- Genus: Harutaeographa
- Species: H. castanea

Binomial name
- Harutaeographa castanea Yoshimoto, 1993

Species of moth

Harutaeographa castanea is a moth of the family Noctuidae. It is found in Nepal (the Kathmandu Valley).
