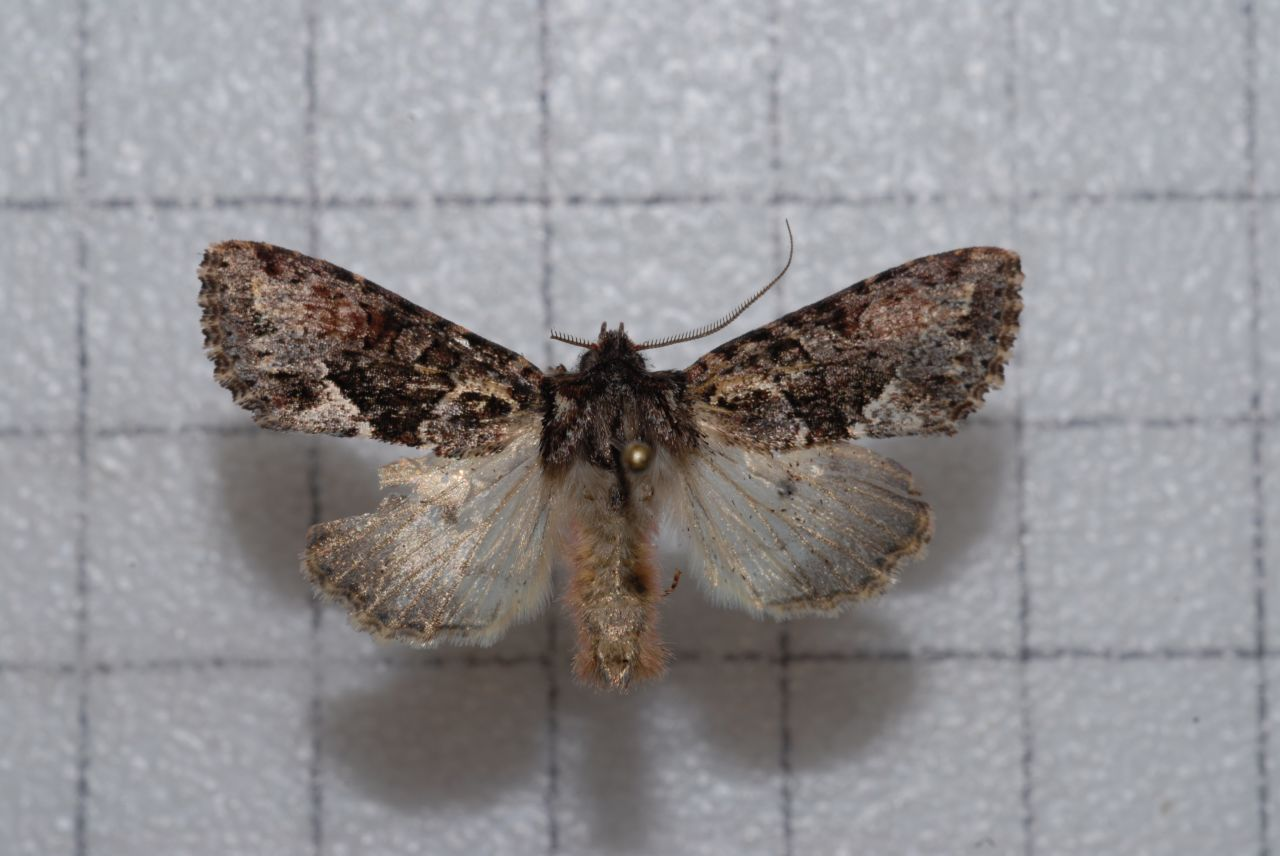
- Xylopolia fulvireniforma

Scientific classification
- Kingdom: Animalia
- Phylum: Arthropoda
- Clade: Pancrustacea
- Class: Insecta
- Order: Lepidoptera
- Superfamily: Noctuoidea
- Family: Noctuidae
- Tribe: Orthosiini
- Genus: Xylopolia; Sugi, 1982

= Xylopolia =

Genus of moths

Xylopolia is a moth genus in the family Noctuidae.

== Species ==
- Xylopolia bella (Butler, 1881)
- Xylopolia fulvireniforma Chang, 1991
