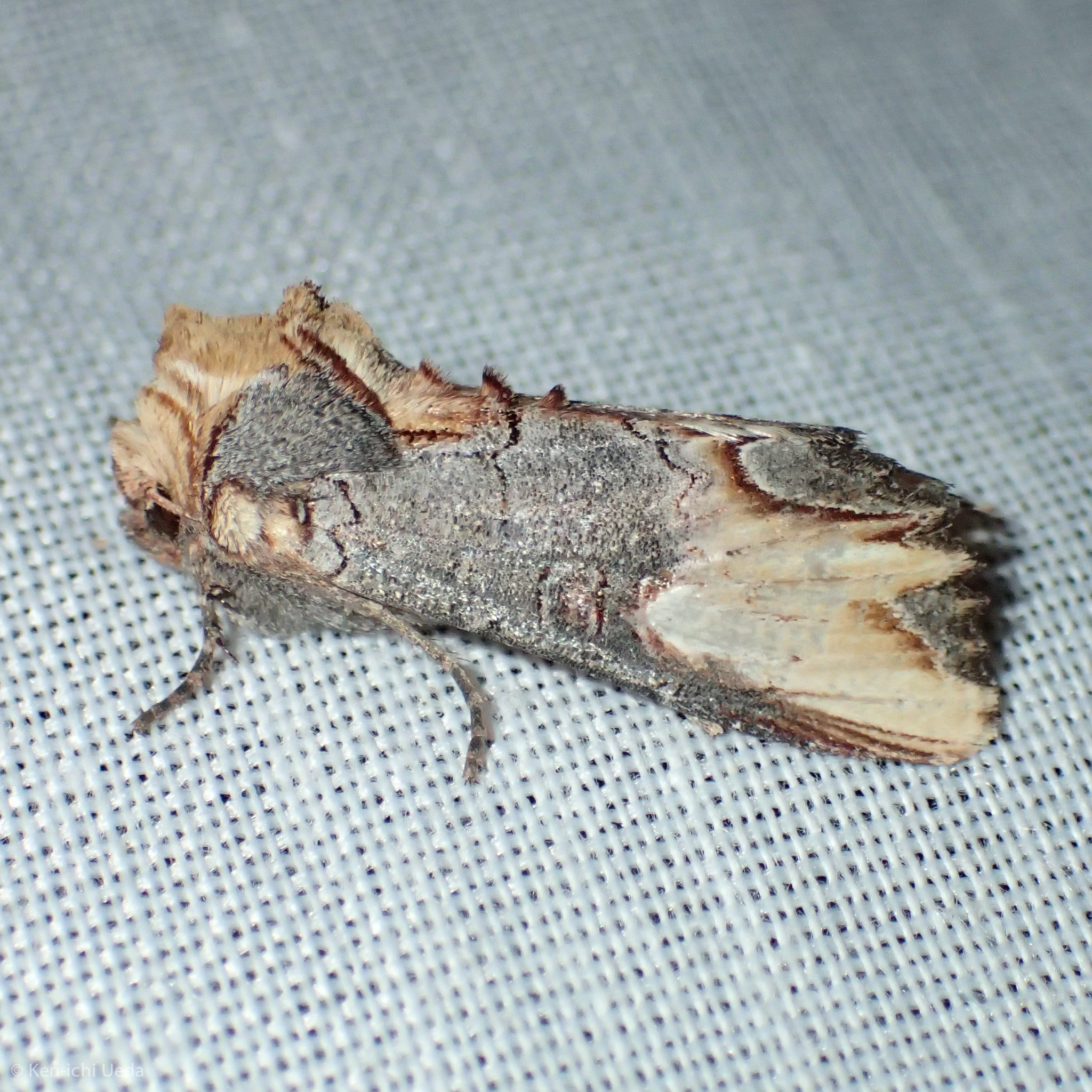

Scientific classification
- Domain: Eukaryota
- Kingdom: Animalia
- Phylum: Arthropoda
- Class: Insecta
- Order: Lepidoptera
- Superfamily: Noctuoidea
- Family: Noctuidae
- Genus: Admetovis
- Species: A. similaris

Binomial name
- Admetovis similaris Barnes, 1904

= Admetovis similaris =

Species of moth

Admetovis similaris is a species of cutworm or dart moth in the family Noctuidae first described by William Barnes in 1904. It is found in North America.
