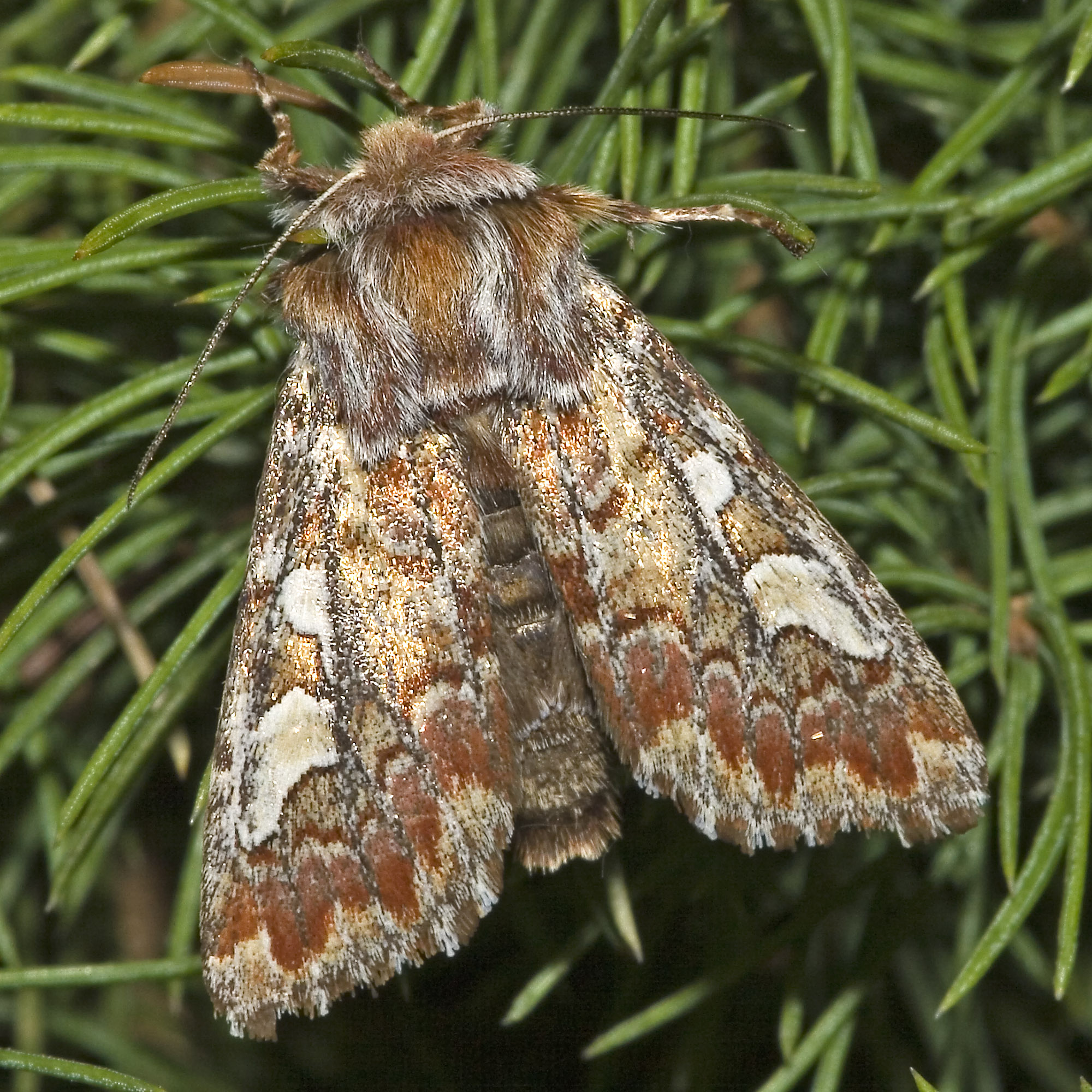
- Panolis flammea

Scientific classification
- Kingdom: Animalia
- Phylum: Arthropoda
- Clade: Pancrustacea
- Class: Insecta
- Order: Lepidoptera
- Superfamily: Noctuoidea
- Family: Noctuidae
- Tribe: Orthosiini
- Genus: Panolis; Hübner, 1821

Type species
- Noctua flammea Denis & Schiffermüller

= Panolis =

Genus of moths

Panolis is a genus of moth in the family Noctuidae.

== Species ==
The following species are included in the genus

- Panolis exquisita Draudt, 1950
- Panolis flammea (Denis & Schiffermüller, 1775)
- Panolis japonica Draudt, 1935
- Panolis pinicortex Draudt, 1950
- Panolis variegatoides (Poole, 1989)
- Panolis ningshan Wang et al., 2014
- Panolis estheri Ronkay et al., 2010
