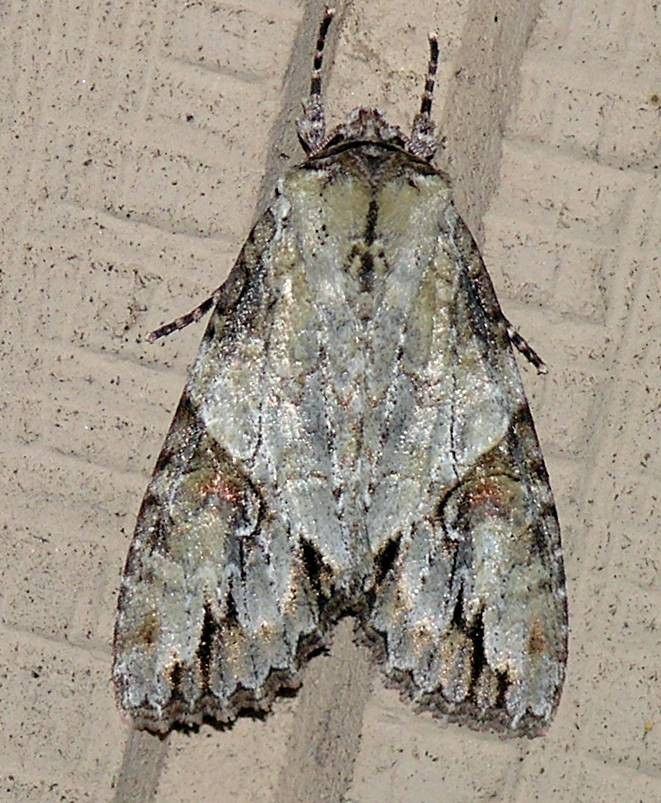

Scientific classification
- Kingdom: Animalia
- Phylum: Arthropoda
- Clade: Pancrustacea
- Class: Insecta
- Order: Lepidoptera
- Superfamily: Noctuoidea
- Family: Noctuidae
- Genus: Morrisonia
- Species: M. latex

Binomial name
- Morrisonia latex Guenée, 1852

Synonyms
- Aplecta latex; Apamea demissa; Polia latex

= Morrisonia latex =

Species of moth

Morrisonia latex, the fluid arches, is a moth of the family Noctuidae. The species was first described by Achille Guenée in 1852. It is found in North America from Nova Scotia to South Carolina, west to Arkansas, and north to Manitoba.

The moth flies from May to July depending on the location.

The larvae feed on Acer rubrum, Acer saccharum, Acer saccharinum, Acer nigrum, Prunus serotina, Betula lenta, Betula nigra, Betula lutea, Betula papyrifera, Ulmus americana, Nyssa sylvatica, Quercus alba, Quercus rubra, Quercus prinus, Quercus velutina and Sassafras albidum.
