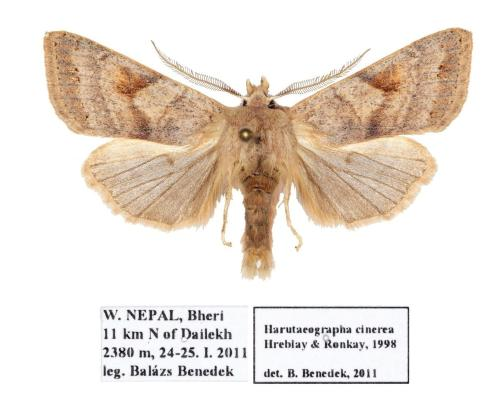
- Male
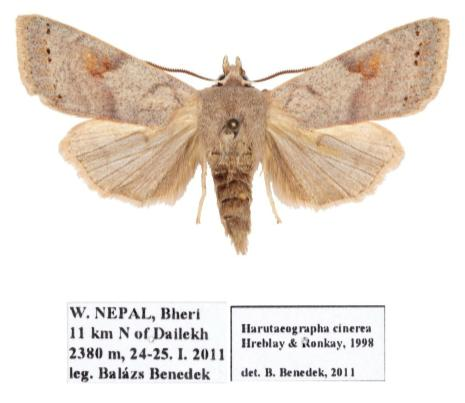
- Female

Scientific classification
- Kingdom: Animalia
- Phylum: Arthropoda
- Clade: Pancrustacea
- Class: Insecta
- Order: Lepidoptera
- Superfamily: Noctuoidea
- Family: Noctuidae
- Genus: Harutaeographa
- Species: H. cinerea

Binomial name
- Harutaeographa cinerea Hreblay & Ronkay, 1998

= Harutaeographa cinerea =

Species of moth

Harutaeographa cinerea is a moth of the family Noctuidae. It is found in Nepal.
