= Harutaeographa rubida =

Scientific classification
- Kingdom: Animalia
- Phylum: Arthropoda
- Clade: Pancrustacea
- Class: Insecta
- Order: Lepidoptera
- Superfamily: Noctuoidea
- Family: Noctuidae
- Genus: Harutaeographa
- Species: H. rubida

Binomial name
- Harutaeographa rubida (Hampson, 1894)

Synonyms
- Bombycia rubida Hampson, 1894; Harutaeographa bipuncta Yoshimoto, 1993

Species of moth

Harutaeographa rubida is a moth of the family Noctuidae. It is found in Nepal and northern India (Sikkim).
