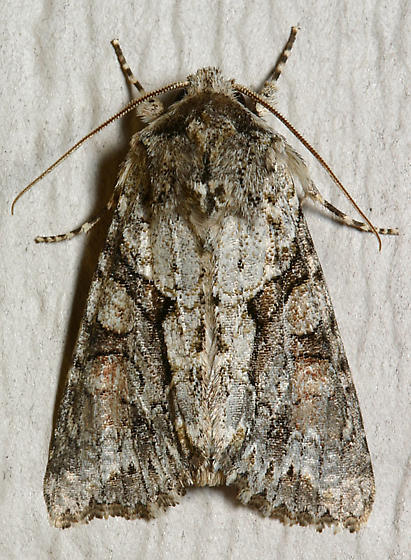

Scientific classification
- Kingdom: Animalia
- Phylum: Arthropoda
- Clade: Pancrustacea
- Class: Insecta
- Order: Lepidoptera
- Superfamily: Noctuoidea
- Family: Noctuidae
- Genus: Achatia
- Species: A. distincta

Binomial name
- Achatia distincta Hübner, [1813]

Synonyms
- Dicopis vitis French, 1879

= Achatia distincta =

Distinct quaker

Species of moth

Achatia distincta, the distinct quaker, is a moth of the family Noctuidae. The species was first described by Jacob Hübner in 1813. It is found from coast to coast in most of United States and south-eastern Canada (from Quebec to Manitoba).

The wingspan is 30–37 mm. Adults are on wing from late March to early May. There is one generation per year.

The larvae feed on the leaves of ash, birch, butternut, flowering crabapple, grape, hickory, maple and oak.
