= Morrisonia mucens =

- Morrisonia mucens

Scientific classification
- Kingdom: Animalia
- Phylum: Arthropoda
- Clade: Pancrustacea
- Class: Insecta
- Order: Lepidoptera
- Superfamily: Noctuoidea
- Family: Noctuidae
- Genus: Morrisonia
- Species: M. mucens

Binomial name
- Morrisonia mucens (Hübner, [1831])

Synonyms
- Septis mucens Hübner, [1831]; Xylina multifaria Walker, 1857; Xylina spoliata Walker, 1857; Xylophasia sectilis Guenée, 1852; Morrisonia rileyana Smith, 1890; Morrisonia sectilana Strand, 1917

Species of moth

Morrisonia mucens, the gray woodgrain, is a moth of the family Noctuidae. The species was first described by Jacob Hübner in 1831. It is found in the United States from coastal Massachusetts south to Florida and west to Texas.

The wingspan is about 29 mm. There is one generation per year.

Larvae have been reared on Quercus nigra.
