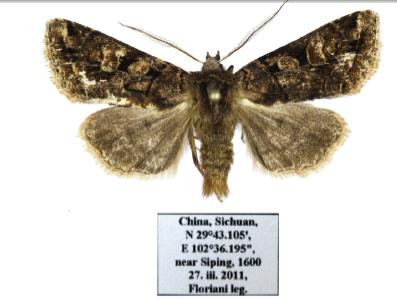
- Male
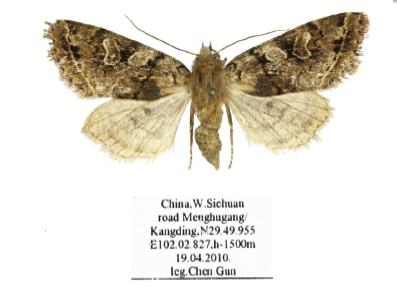
- Female

Scientific classification
- Kingdom: Animalia
- Phylum: Arthropoda
- Clade: Pancrustacea
- Class: Insecta
- Order: Lepidoptera
- Superfamily: Noctuoidea
- Family: Noctuidae
- Genus: Harutaeographa
- Species: H. shui

Binomial name
- Harutaeographa shui Benedek & Saldaitis, 2012

= Harutaeographa shui =

Species of moth

Harutaeographa shui is a moth of the family Noctuidae. It is found in China (Sichuan), on the eastern edge of Tibetan Plateau. The habitat consists of mountain virgin mixed forests dominated by various broad-leaved trees, rhododendrons and bamboos.

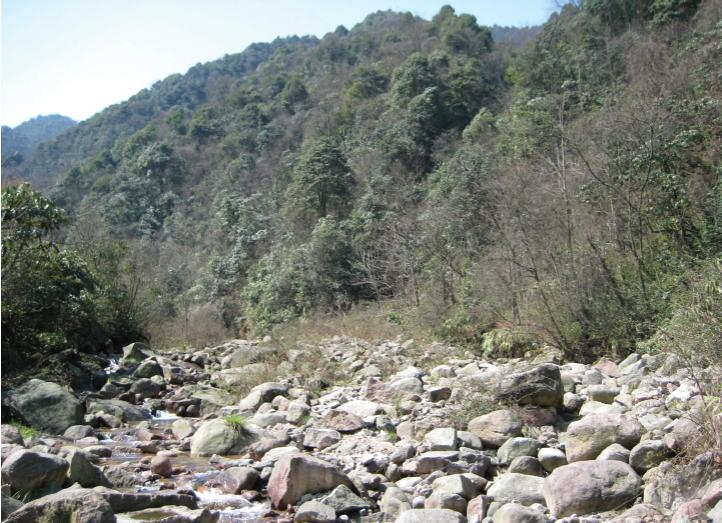
Type locality, China, Sichuan near Siping

The wingspan is 37–42 millimetres (1.5–1.7 in). The forewings are richly decorated with dark coppery-brown patterns distinctly marked with black scales. The outer margin and cilia are lighter golden yellow. The hindwings have an intensive dark suffusion, which is especially wide on the outer margin, the discal spot and the well-marked postmedial fascia.

Adults have been collected from the end of March to the beginning of April at altitudes ranging from 1,500–1,600 metres (4,900–5,200 ft).

== Etymology ==
The specific name refers to the Shu (state), which is now Chengdu, the capital of China's Sichuan province.
