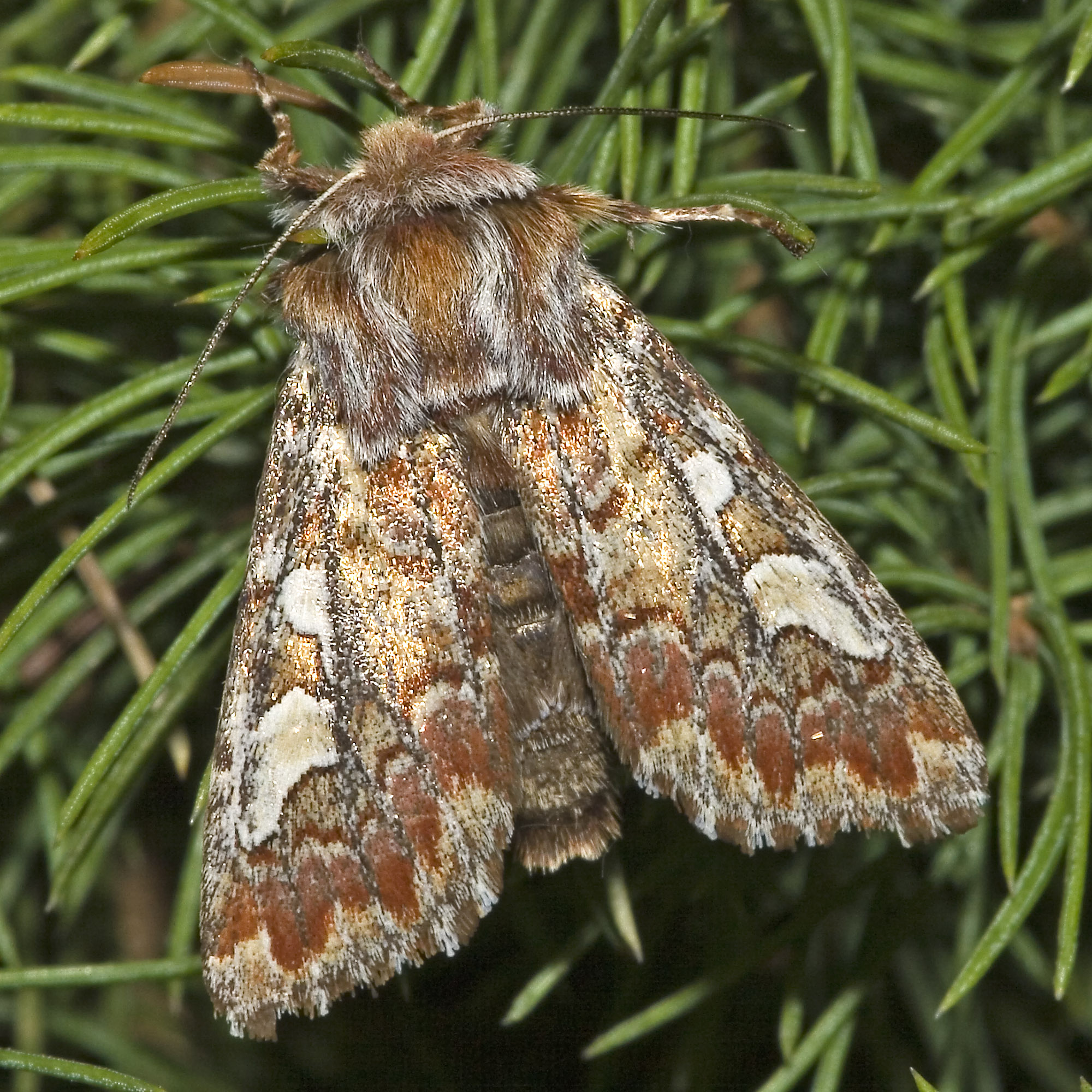

Scientific classification
- Domain: Eukaryota
- Kingdom: Animalia
- Phylum: Arthropoda
- Class: Insecta
- Order: Lepidoptera
- Superfamily: Noctuoidea
- Family: Noctuidae
- Genus: Panolis
- Species: P. flammea

Binomial name
- Panolis flammea (Denis & Schiffermüller, 1775)

= Pine beauty =

Species of moth

The pine beauty (Panolis flammea) is a moth of the family Noctuidae. It is a common species of pine woods in Europe. The distribution area extends from Portugal to western Siberia, the Caucasus and Asia Minor. In the north it extends to the Arctic Circle, in the south it is found in Ceuta in Northern Africa in and southern Italy (including Sicily and Sardinia).

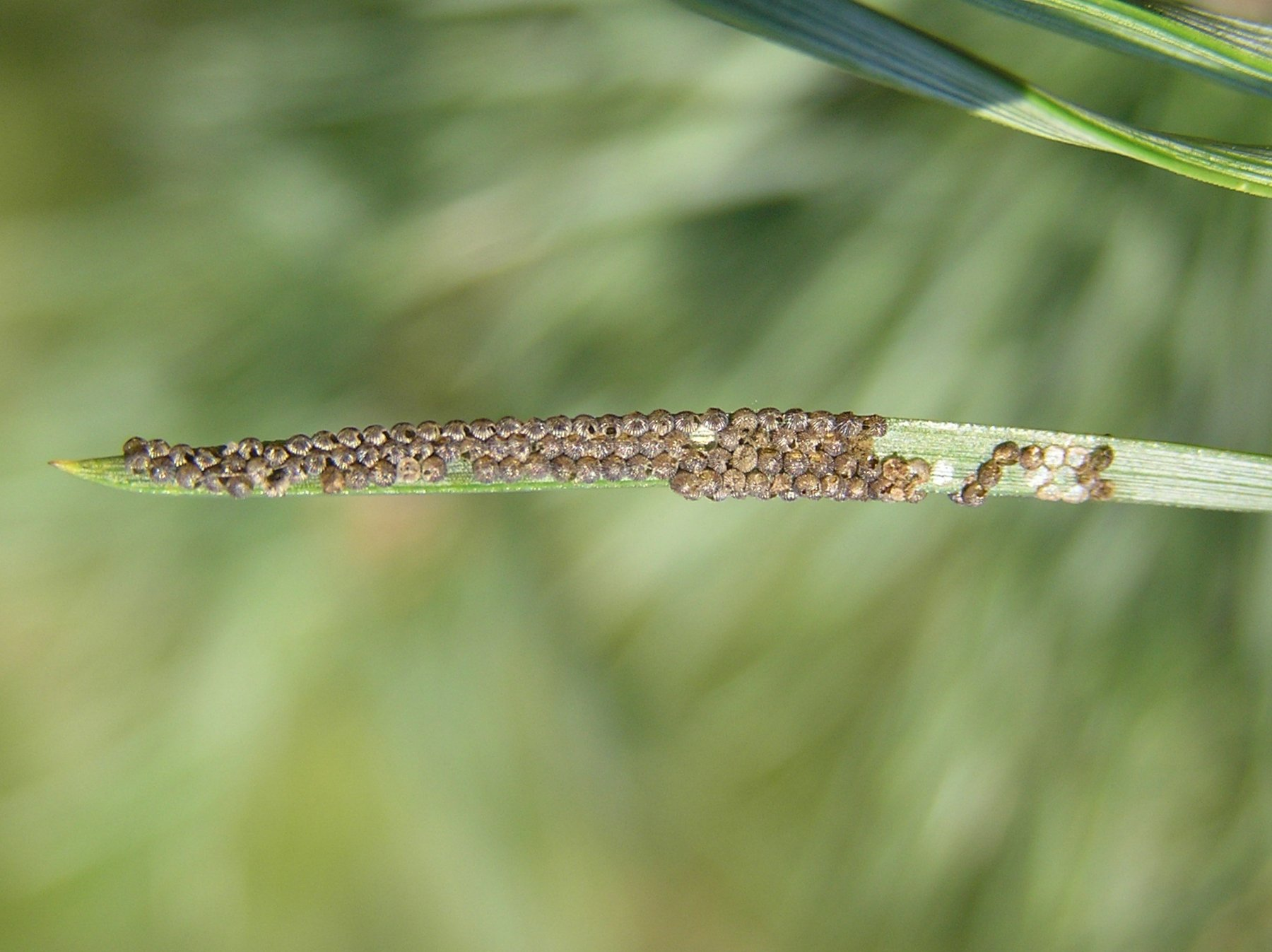
Eggs

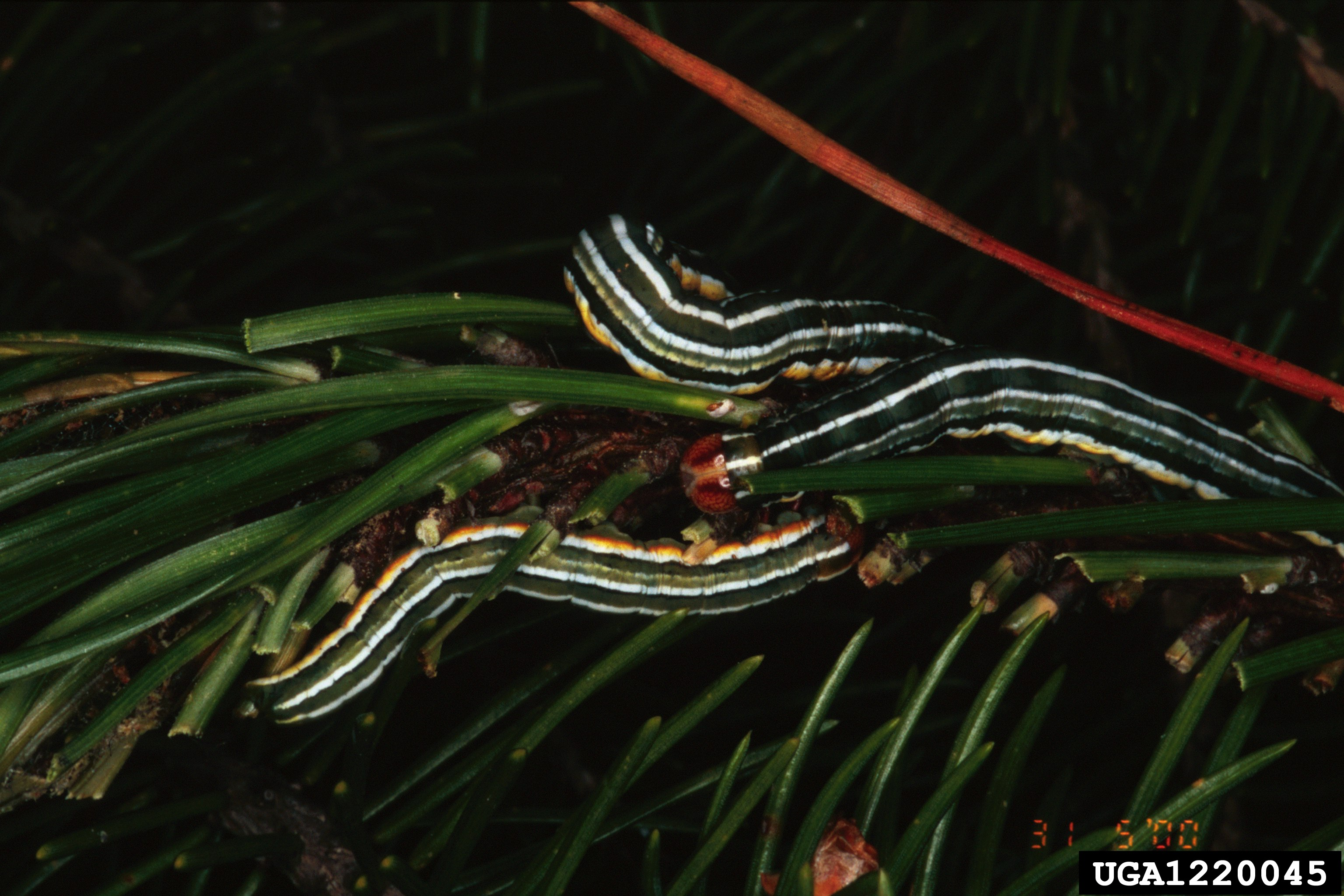
Caterpillar

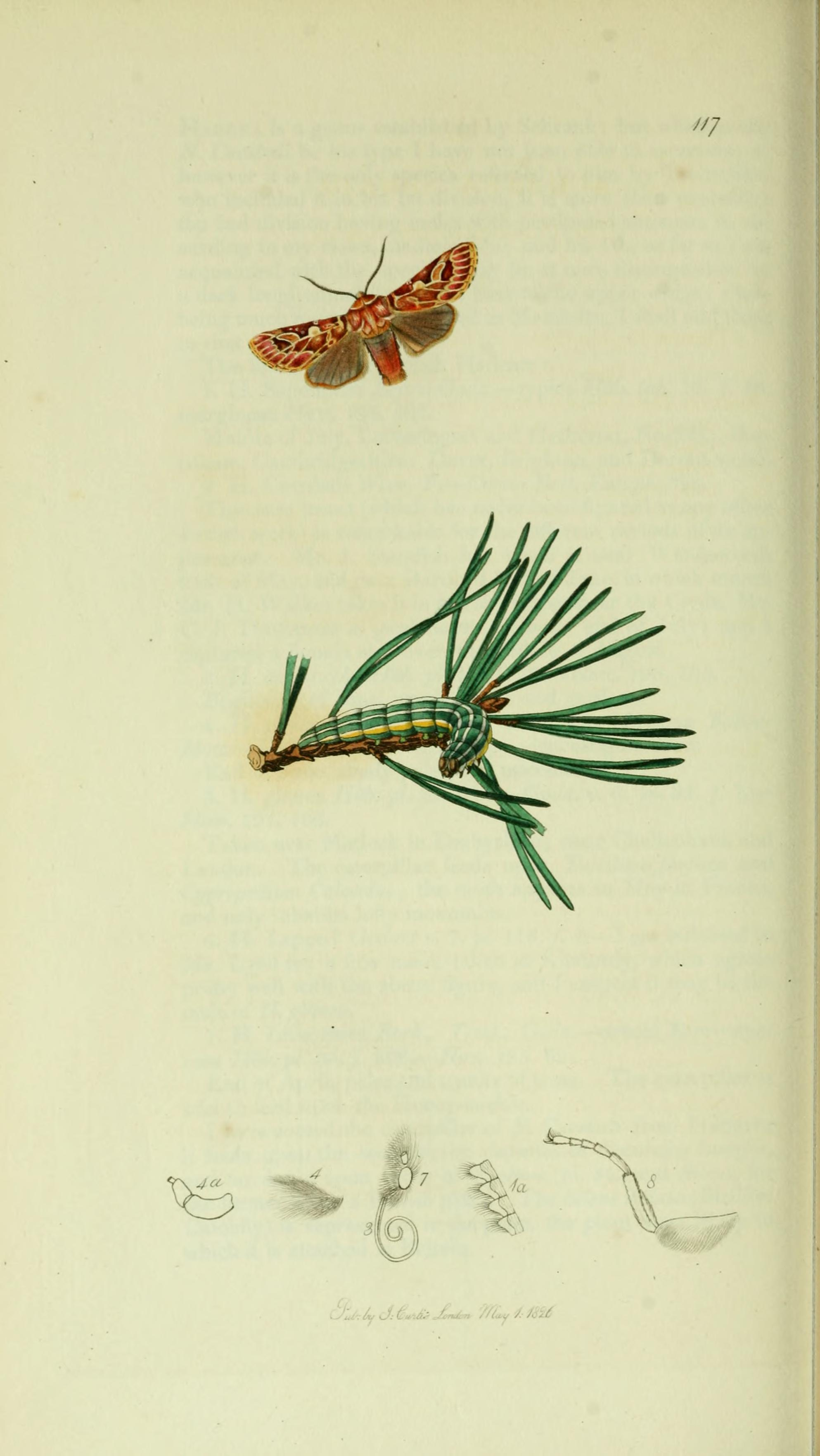
Illustration from John Curtis's British Entomology Volume 5

The forewings are typically rich orange brown, but sometimes are dark grey, with two large pale stigmata and fine streaks along the termen. The hindwings are brown or blackish.

== Technical description and variation ==
The wingspan is 32–40 mm. Forewing orange rufous with some ochreous admixture; the veins dotted grey and white; the inner and outer lines deeper rufous, conversely edged with white, and dentate lunulate; submarginal line pale, preceded by a dentate rufous shade; the terminal area often paler; stigmata large, irregular; the claviform with some pale and brown scales at its extremity; orbicular and reniform pale rufous with deeper centres, the orbicular flattened, its lower edge often produced along median vein as a streak and connected with reniform, which is large with the upper end angularly produced outwards; fringe mottled rufous and white hindwing fuscous, often with a reddish tinge; the ab. griseovariegata Goeze has the rufous tints obscured by glaucous grey and fuscous.

== Biology ==
This moth flies at night from March to May and is attracted to light and sallow blossom.

Larva bright green with the lines broadly white edged with deep green; spiracular line edged below with yellow. It feeds on the needles of Pinus sylvestris and other pines, but sometimes on other trees (see list below), and can be a serious pest in forests. The species overwinters as a pupa.

1. The flight season refers to the British Isles. This may vary in other parts of the range.

== Recorded food plants ==
- Abies – fir
- Betula – birch
- Chamaecyparis
- Juniperus – juniper
- Larix – larch
- Picea – spruce
- Pinus – pine
- Pseudotsuga – Douglas-fir
- Quercus – oak

See Robinson, G. S. et al.
