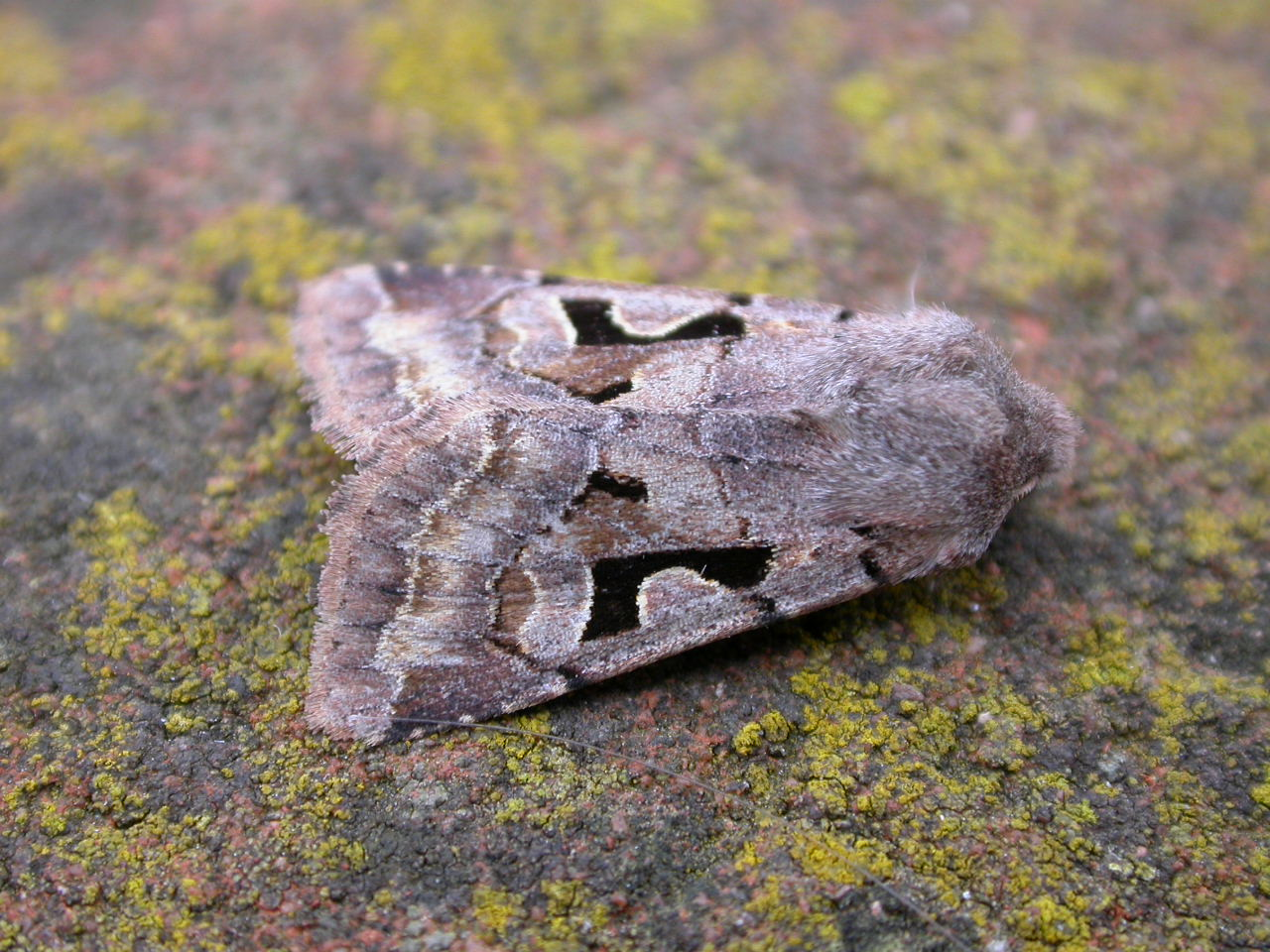
- Hebrew character (Orthosia gothica)

Scientific classification
- Kingdom: Animalia
- Phylum: Arthropoda
- Clade: Pancrustacea
- Class: Insecta
- Order: Lepidoptera
- Superfamily: Noctuoidea
- Family: Noctuidae
- Subfamily: Noctuinae
- Tribe: Orthosiini; Guenée, 1837

= Orthosiini =

Tribe of moths

The Orthosiini are a mid-sized tribe of noctuid moths in the subfamily Noctuinae. The tribe was erected by Achille Guenée in 1837. It was previously included in the former subfamily Hadeninae before being moved.

Genera include:

- Achatia
- Anorthoa
- Dioszeghyana
- Egira
- Harutaeographa
- Houlberthosia
- Kisegira
- Lacinipolia
- Lithopolia
- Morrisonia
- Orthosia
- Panolis
- Perigonica
- Perigrapha
- Stretchia
- Xylopolia
