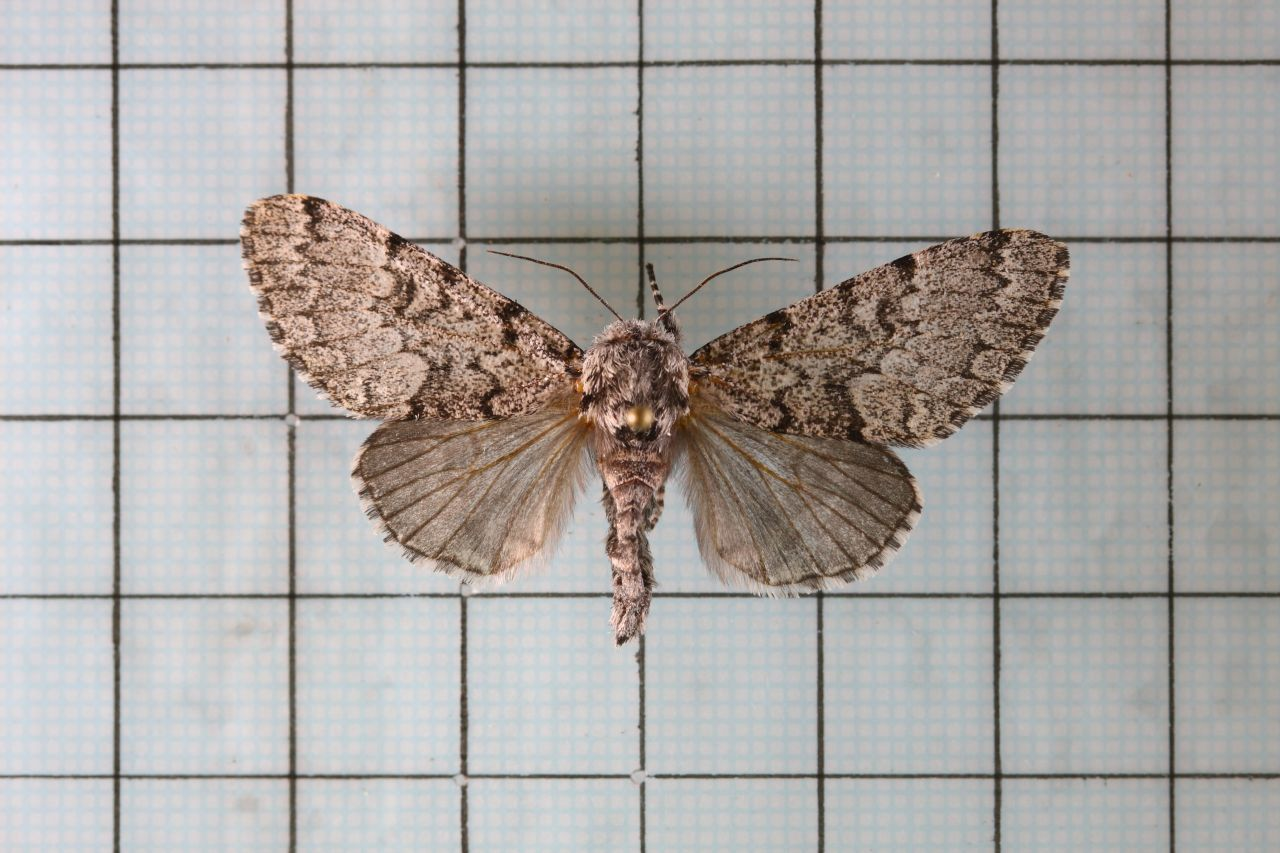

Scientific classification
- Kingdom: Animalia
- Phylum: Arthropoda
- Clade: Pancrustacea
- Class: Insecta
- Order: Lepidoptera
- Superfamily: Noctuoidea
- Family: Noctuidae
- Genus: Panthea
- Species: P. grisea

Binomial name
- Panthea grisea Wileman, 1910

= Panthea grisea =

Species of moth

Panthea grisea is a moth of the family Noctuidae. It is found in Taiwan.
