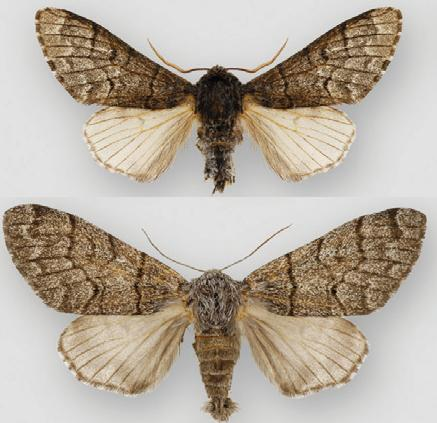
- Panthea gigantea male (top), female (bottom)

Scientific classification
- Kingdom: Animalia
- Phylum: Arthropoda
- Clade: Pancrustacea
- Class: Insecta
- Order: Lepidoptera
- Superfamily: Noctuoidea
- Family: Noctuidae
- Genus: Panthea
- Species: P. gigantea

Binomial name
- Panthea gigantea (French, 1890)

Synonyms
- Platycerura gigantea French, 1890; Diphthera gigantea

= Panthea gigantea =

Species of moth

Panthea gigantea is a moth of the family Noctuidae. It is found throughout much of the warmer and drier regions of western North America from south-central British Columbia, south to the state of Durango in Mexico and from the Black Hills of South Dakota, western Nebraska and the Texas Panhandle west to Washington, Oregon and the coast of California.

Panthea gigantea is on average the largest New World species of Panthea with some females having a wingspan in excess of 60 mm.
