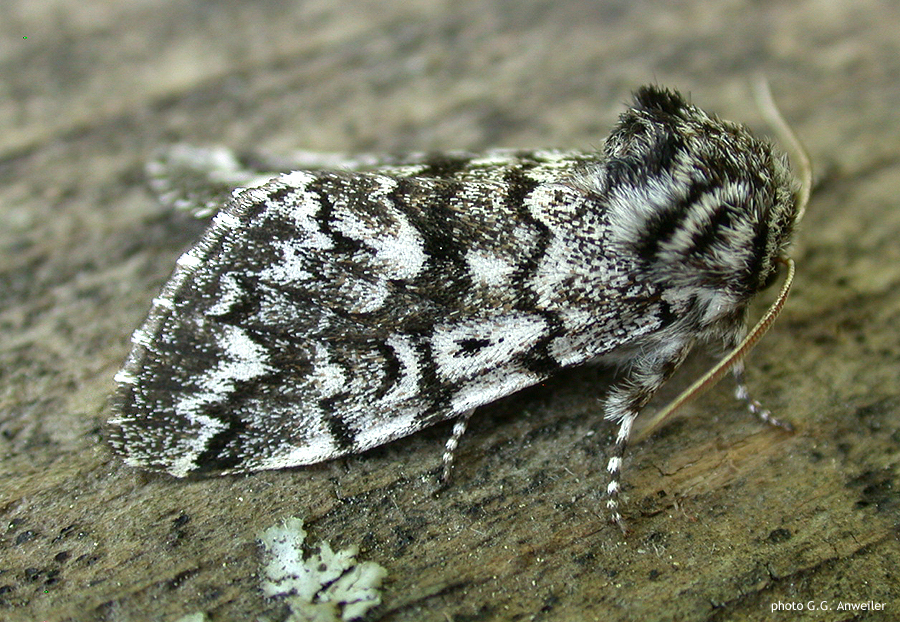
- Black zigzag (P. acronyctoides)

Scientific classification
- Kingdom: Animalia
- Phylum: Arthropoda
- Clade: Pancrustacea
- Class: Insecta
- Order: Lepidoptera
- Superfamily: Noctuoidea
- Family: Noctuidae
- Subfamily: Pantheinae
- Genus: Panthea; Hübner, 1820

= Panthea =

Genus of moths

Panthea is a genus of the owlet moth family, Noctuidae. The word Panthea is from Greek, meaning "all of gods" .

== Species ==
- Panthea acronyctoides – Black zigzag, tufted spruce caterpillar
- Panthea apanthea
- Panthea coenobita
- Panthea furcilla – Eastern panthea, tufted white pine caterpillar
- Panthea gigantea
- Panthea greyi
- Panthea grisea
- Panthea guatemala
- Panthea hoenei (Draudt 1950)
- Panthea judyae
- Panthea reducta
- Panthea roberti (de Johannis, 1928)
- Panthea virginarius – Cascades panthea
