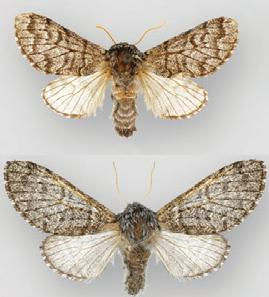
- Panthea apanthea male (top), female (bottom)

Scientific classification
- Kingdom: Animalia
- Phylum: Arthropoda
- Clade: Pancrustacea
- Class: Insecta
- Order: Lepidoptera
- Superfamily: Noctuoidea
- Family: Noctuidae
- Genus: Panthea
- Species: P. apanthea

Binomial name
- Panthea apanthea Anweiler, 2009

= Panthea apanthea =

Species of moth

Panthea apanthea is a moth of the family Noctuidae. The species is found in three areas of the south-western United States, Coconino County and Apache County (White Mountains) in Arizona, and El Paso County in east-central Colorado.

The wingspan is about 30 mm for males and about 36 mm for females. Adults are on wing in early August.
