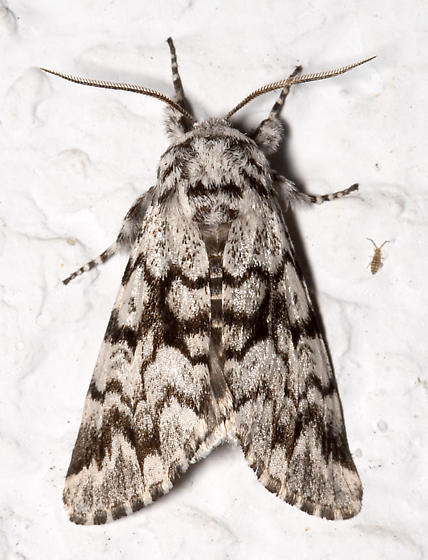

Scientific classification
- Kingdom: Animalia
- Phylum: Arthropoda
- Clade: Pancrustacea
- Class: Insecta
- Order: Lepidoptera
- Superfamily: Noctuoidea
- Family: Noctuidae
- Genus: Panthea
- Species: P. acronyctoides

Binomial name
- Panthea acronyctoides (Walker, 1861)

Synonyms
- Audela acronyctoides Walker, 1861; Panthea leucomelana Morrison, 1876; Diphthera acronyctoides Walker, 1861, Draudt, 1924 in Seitz, 1924; Panthea albosuffusa McDunnough, 1937 (form)

= Panthea acronyctoides =

Species of moth

Panthea acronyctoides, the black zigzag or tufted spruce caterpillar, is a moth of the family Noctuidae. The species was first described by Francis Walker in 1861. It is found in North America from Newfoundland to British Columbia and adjacent northern states, south in the west to Colorado, south in the east to New England and Kentucky.

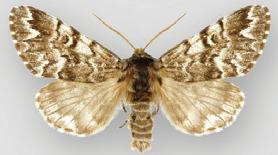
Male Panthea acronyctoides acronyctoides

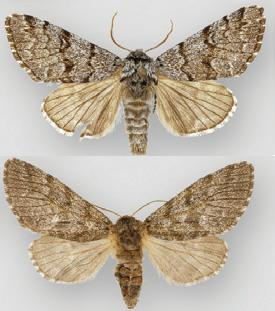
Male (top) and female Panthea acronyctoides nigra

The wingspan is 30–35 mm. The moth flies from May to August depending on the location.

The larvae feed on balsam fir, eastern hemlock, eastern larch, pines, and spruces.

== Subspecies ==
There are two recognised subspecies:

- Panthea acronyctoides acronyctoides (Walker, 1861)
- Panthea acronyctoides nigra Anweiler, 2009
