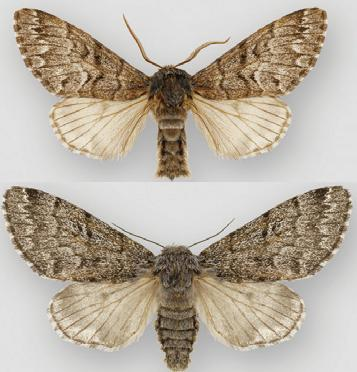
- Panthea virginarius male (top), female (bottom)

Scientific classification
- Kingdom: Animalia
- Phylum: Arthropoda
- Clade: Pancrustacea
- Class: Insecta
- Order: Lepidoptera
- Superfamily: Noctuoidea
- Family: Noctuidae
- Genus: Panthea
- Species: P. virginarius

Binomial name
- Panthea virginarius (Grote, 1880)

Synonyms
- Panthea potlandia; Biston virginarius Grote, 1880; Lycia virginaria; Panthea virginaria (Grote, 1880); Panthea angelica (Dyar, 1921); Panthea portlandia (Grote, 1896); Panthea suffusa McDunnough, 1942

= Panthea virginarius =

Species of moth

Panthea virginarius, the Cascades panthea, is a moth of the family Noctuidae. It is mainly found west and north of the Great Basin, from the coast of southern California northward to the Queen Charlotte Islands of British Columbia and the Alaskan Panhandle, eastward to central California, northern Nevada, Idaho, north-western Wyoming, western Montana, and south-western Alberta. A disjunct population is found in the Cypress Hills of Alberta and Saskatchewan.

The species is highly variable in both size and colour; the angelica and portlandia forms for example were considered separate species up to 2009.

The larvae feed on Pseudotsuga menziesii and other conifers.
