= Protapamea danieli =

Scientific classification
- Kingdom: Animalia
- Phylum: Arthropoda
- Class: Insecta
- Order: Lepidoptera
- Superfamily: Noctuoidea
- Family: Noctuidae
- Tribe: Apameini
- Genus: Protapamea
- Species: P. danieli

Binomial name
- Protapamea danieli Quinter, 2009

Species of moth

Protapamea danieli is a species of cutworm or dart moth in the family Noctuidae. It is endemic to the United States.
