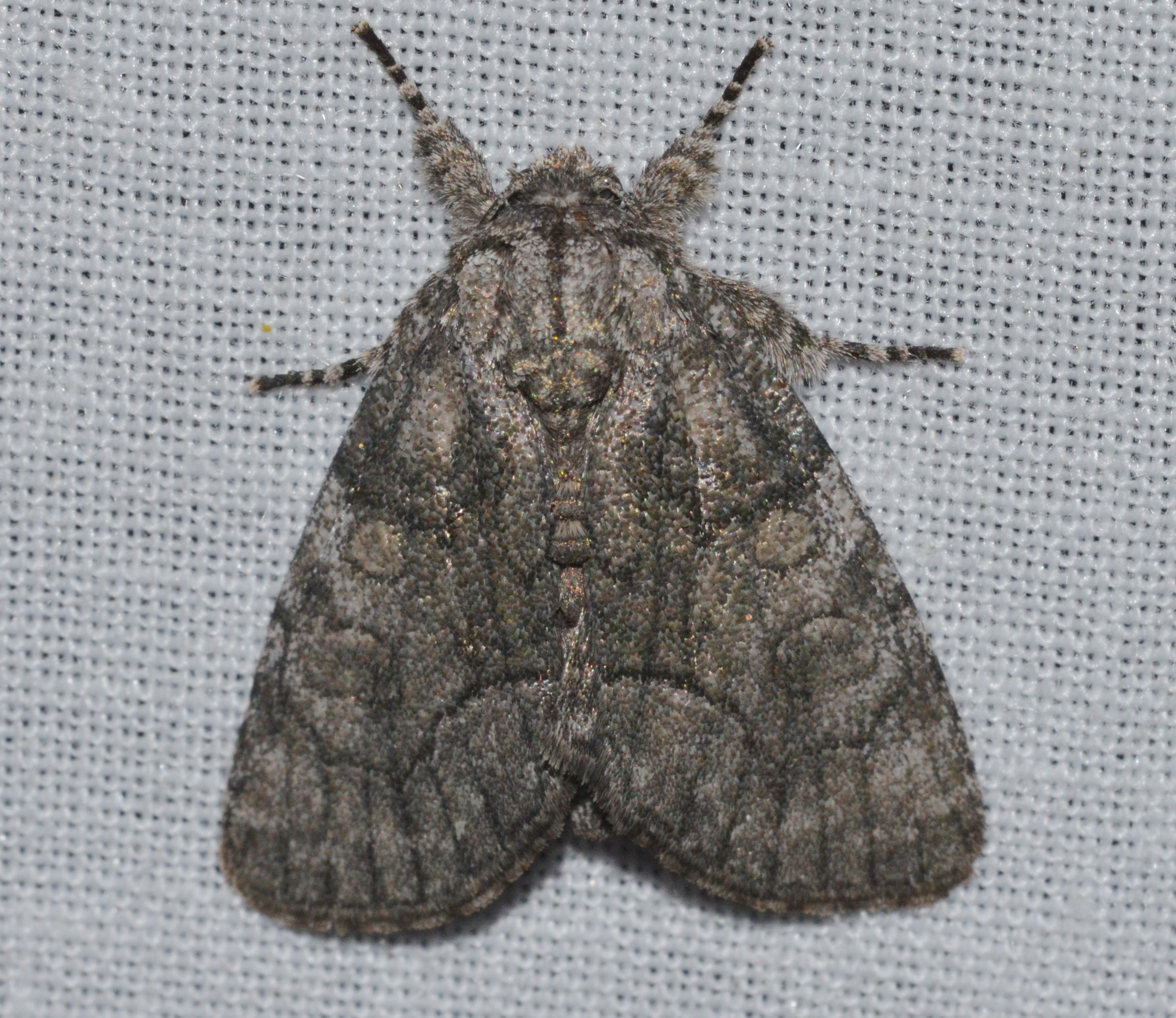

Scientific classification
- Kingdom: Animalia
- Phylum: Arthropoda
- Clade: Pancrustacea
- Class: Insecta
- Order: Lepidoptera
- Superfamily: Noctuoidea
- Family: Noctuidae
- Genus: Raphia
- Species: R. frater

Binomial name
- Raphia frater Grote, 1864

Synonyms
- Raphia personata (Walker, 1865); Certila flexuosa Walker, 1865; Raphia frater var. coloradensis Putnam-Cramer, 1886; Raphia pallula H. Edwards, 1886; Raphia cinderella Smith, 1903; Raphia elbea Smith, 1908; Raphia piazzi Hill, 1927

= Raphia frater =

Species of moth

Raphia frater, the brother moth or simply the brother, is a moth of the family Noctuidae. It is found from Nova Scotia west, across the forested regions of Canada to British Columbia, south to Mississippi in the east. The southern limits in the west are uncertain due to confusion with several closely related species or forms.

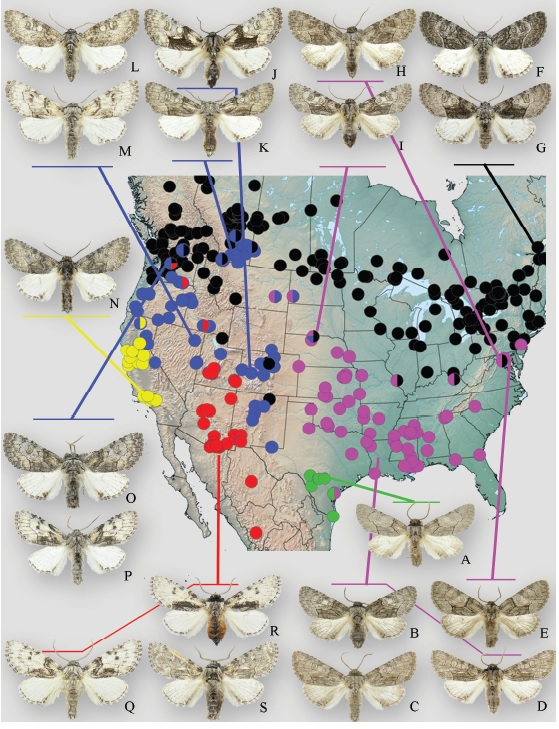
Geographic distribution and phenotypic variation of Raphia frater subspecies: green – subsp. piazzi; pink – subsp. abrupta; black – subsp. frater; blue – subsp. coloradensis; yellow – subsp. cinderella. Multi-coloured circles indicate transitional populations and/or phenotypically intermediate specimens between respective subspecies. a R. f. piazzi; b R. f. abrupta; c R. f. abrupta; d R. f. abrupta; e R. f. abrupta; f, g R. f. frater; h R. f. abrupta – frater intermediate i R. f. abrupta – frater – coloradensis intermediate from highly variable population in Cherry Co., NE; j R. f. coloradensis; k R. f. coloradensis; l R. f. coloradensis; m R. f. coloradensis; n R. f. cinderella; o, p R. f. coloradensis – frater intermediates; q R. f. elbea; r R. f. elbea; s R. f. elbea. All specimens are males.

The wingspan is 38–44 mm. Adults are on wing from April or May to August. There is one or two generations per year.

The larvae mainly feed on aspen, but have also been recorded from alder, birch, cottonwood, and willow.

== Subspecies ==
- Raphia frater frater (Prairie Provinces, in the east south of the Great Lakes region into Pennsylvania, Ohio and Indiana; In the West, it occurs south along mid-elevation mountain ranges of the Pacific Northwest into Washington, and southward along the Rocky Mountains. Specimens from high elevations in Colorado and New Mexico)
- Raphia frater abrupta Grote, 1864 (Maryland, Oklahoma and Texas)
- Raphia frater cinderella Smith, 1903 (central and southern California west of the Sierra Nevada)
- Raphia frater coloradensis Putnam-Cramer, 1886 (from British Columbia, south in the mountains to at least Colorado and Utah and northeast to southern Alberta)
- Raphia frater elbea Smith, 1908 (from south-eastern Utah and western New Mexico southward through Arizona into northern Mexico)
- Raphia frater piazzi Hill, 1927 (central and southern Texas)

== Gallery ==
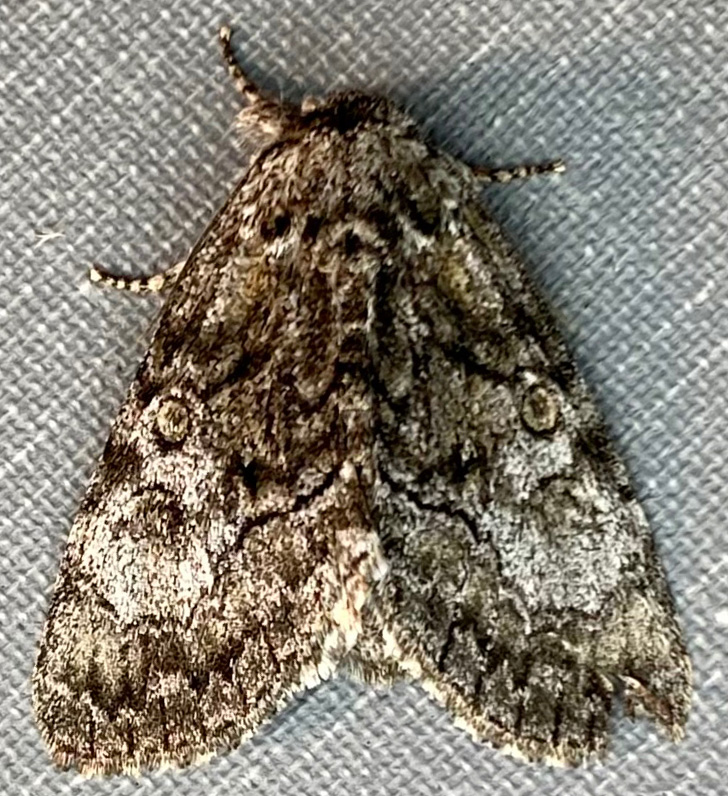
'Raphia frater' found in Oregon

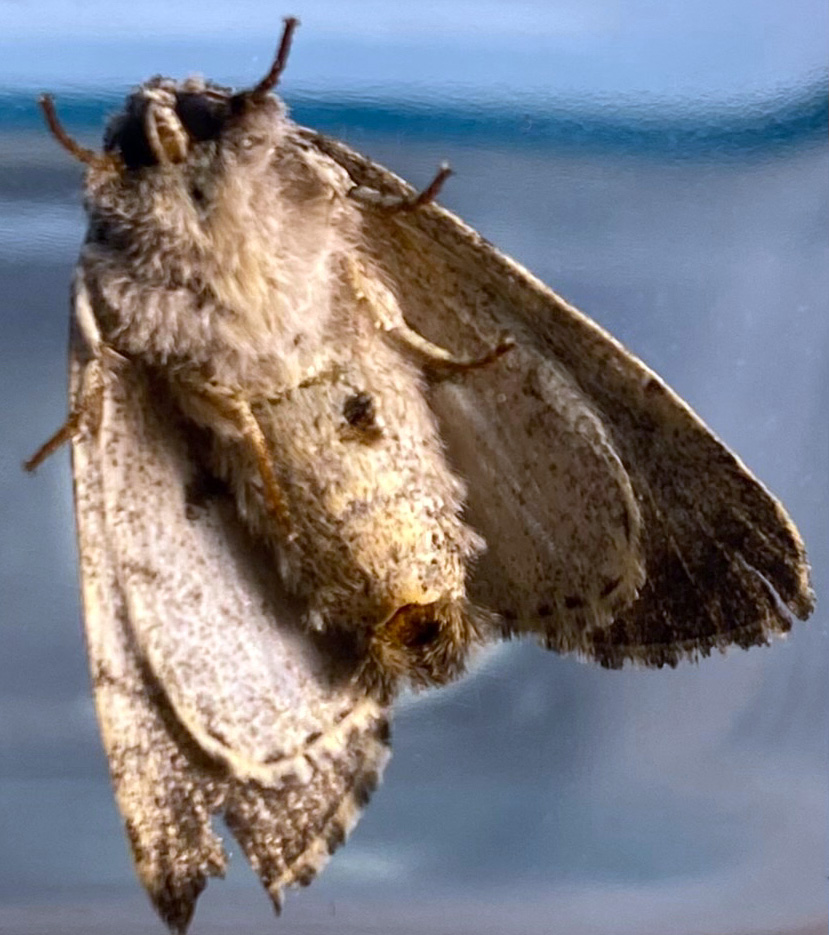
Raphia frater viewed from below

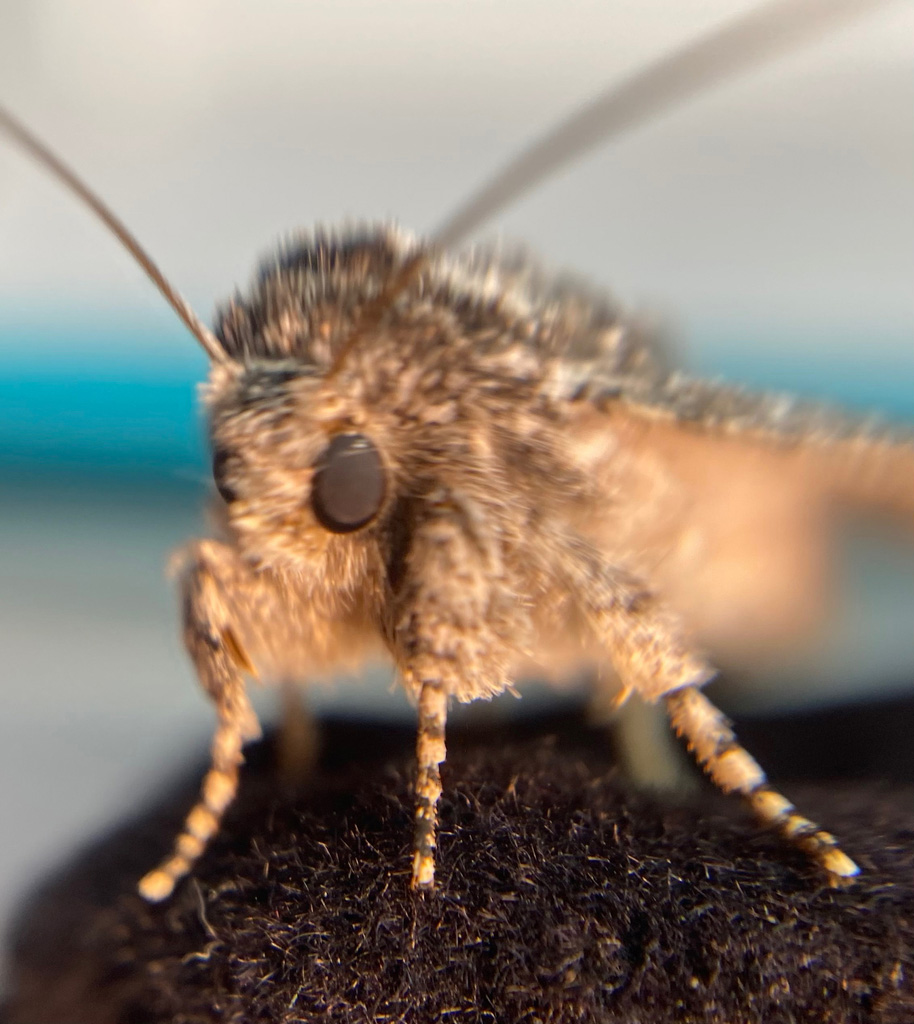
Raphia frater close up view of face
