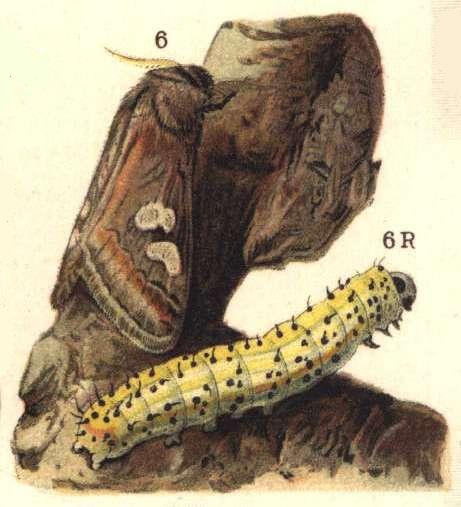

Scientific classification
- Kingdom: Animalia
- Phylum: Arthropoda
- Class: Insecta
- Order: Lepidoptera
- Superfamily: Noctuoidea
- Family: Noctuidae
- Genus: Diloba
- Species: D. caeruleocephala

Binomial name
- Diloba caeruleocephala (Linnaeus, 1758)

= Diloba caeruleocephala =

Species of moth

Diloba caeruleocephala, the figure of eight, is a moth of the family Noctuidae. It is found in the Palearctic.

== Distribution ==
Diloba caeruleocephala is found in most of Europe except northern Scandinavia, the northern part of the British Isles and the North of Russia.

In the South, it occurs in North Africa, the Middle East (Lebanon, Israel, Jordan), Asia Minor, Iran and Kazakhstan. It is largely missing in Portugal.

== Description ==
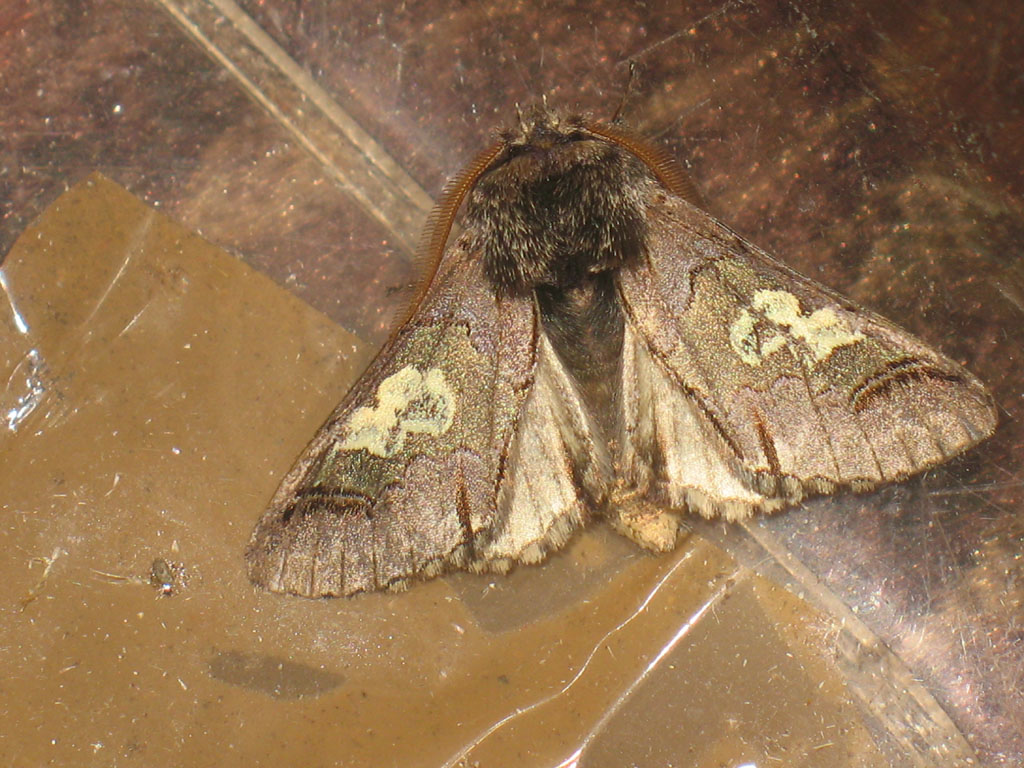
Diloba caeruleocephala Moscow oblast

The wingspan is 30–40 mm. The length of the forewings is 15–19 mm. The heavily combed antennae of the male and the thick, woolly-hairy body of the female is atypical for Noctuidae. The forewings are grey or grey-brown with a purple sheen. The reniform and orbicular stigmata are both in the shape of a figure 8 enclosed in yellowish white. The post median and subterminal lines are black. There is a black tornal streak. The hindwing is an ochreous white. The cilia are greyish brown with a wedge-shaped black tornal mark.

The egg is hemispherical and initially white; later it becomes yellowish and is yellowish brown right before hatching. It has in the fresh state 13 to 16 wide, greenish longitudinal ribs.

The larvae are relatively thick at all stages, relatively short and roundish in cross-section. The first instar is light to dark brown and has long bristles on the entire top of the body. The second instar is black with yellow dorsal lines. The head is cream with two black, dorsal stripes. The third instar is blue-grey with yellowish, subdorsal bands. The head is now grey-blue with two large black spots. The penultimate instar resembles the third . In the last instar, the caterpillar is greenish to bluish and has a series of yellow spots on the back and on the side, which are so close together in some specimens that they result arranged in three longitudinal stripes. Distributed all over the body are black warts with individual bristles. The head is blue with two black dots. The adult caterpillar is up to 40 millimeters long.

The pupa is relatively short and thick. It is reddish brown with a slight shade of blue. At the rear end there are two lateral protrusions, on each of which four bristles sit.

The moth flies in one generation from late August to mid-November in Belgium and The Netherlands; and late September to mid-November in the UK.

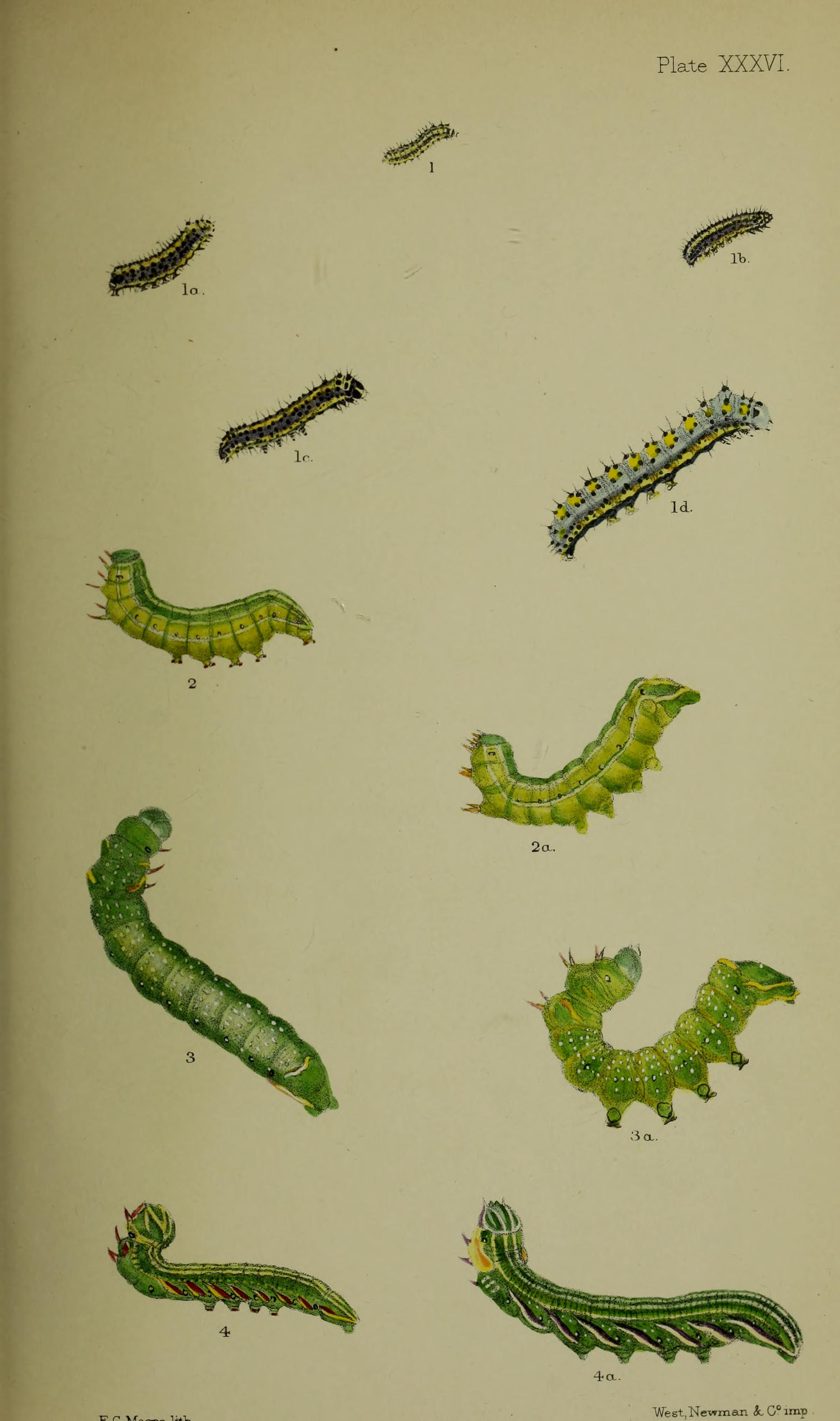
Figs.1 young larva after first moult; 1a larva after second moult; 1b, 1c larva after third moult;1d larvae after last moult

The larvae feed on various deciduous trees and shrubs, mainly Sorbus, Prunus spinosa and Crataegus. .
