= Raphiinae =

Raphiinae may refer to:

- Raphiinae (moth), a subfamily of moths in the family Noctuidae
- Raphiinae (plant), a subtribe of plants in the family Arecaceae
