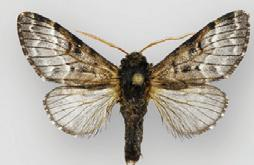

Scientific classification
- Kingdom: Animalia
- Phylum: Arthropoda
- Clade: Pancrustacea
- Class: Insecta
- Order: Lepidoptera
- Superfamily: Noctuoidea
- Family: Noctuidae
- Genus: Panthea
- Species: P. reducta

Binomial name
- Panthea reducta Anweiler, 2009

= Panthea reducta =

Species of moth

Panthea reducta is a moth of the family Noctuidae. It has been collected at an elevation of 1,800 m (5,900 ft) in a Hispaniolan pine forest in Sierra de Bahoruco National Park in the Dominican Republic.

The larvae probably feed on Pinus occidentalis.
