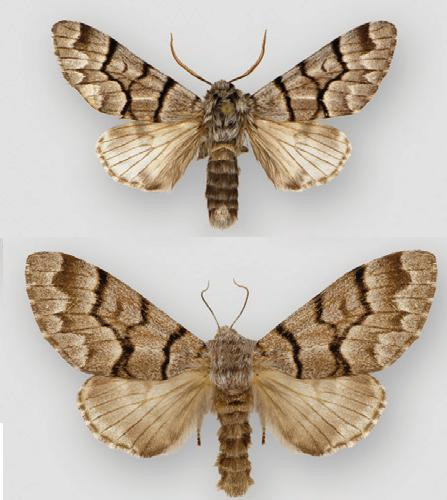
- Panthea guatemala male (top), female (bottom)

Scientific classification
- Kingdom: Animalia
- Phylum: Arthropoda
- Clade: Pancrustacea
- Class: Insecta
- Order: Lepidoptera
- Superfamily: Noctuoidea
- Family: Noctuidae
- Genus: Panthea
- Species: P. guatemala

Binomial name
- Panthea guatemala Anweiler, 2009

= Panthea guatemala =

Species of moth

Panthea guatemala is a moth of the family Noctuidae. It has been collected in the mountains of Guatemala and the states of Oaxaca and Chiapas in adjacent southern Mexico at elevations of 1580–1850 m.
