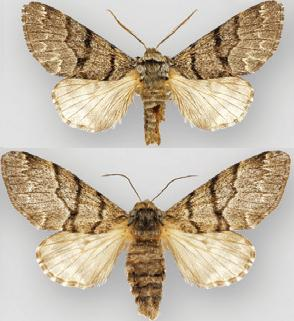
- Panthea greyi male (top), female (bottom)

Scientific classification
- Kingdom: Animalia
- Phylum: Arthropoda
- Clade: Pancrustacea
- Class: Insecta
- Order: Lepidoptera
- Superfamily: Noctuoidea
- Family: Noctuidae
- Genus: Panthea
- Species: P. greyi

Binomial name
- Panthea greyi Anweiler, 2009

= Panthea greyi =

Species of moth

Panthea greyi is a moth of the family Noctuidae. It has been collected in the mountains of Arizona, New Mexico, Colorado and southern Utah, at elevations of 1524–2545 m.

The wingspan is 38–45 mm for males and 42–50 mm for females. Adults are on wing from June to September.
