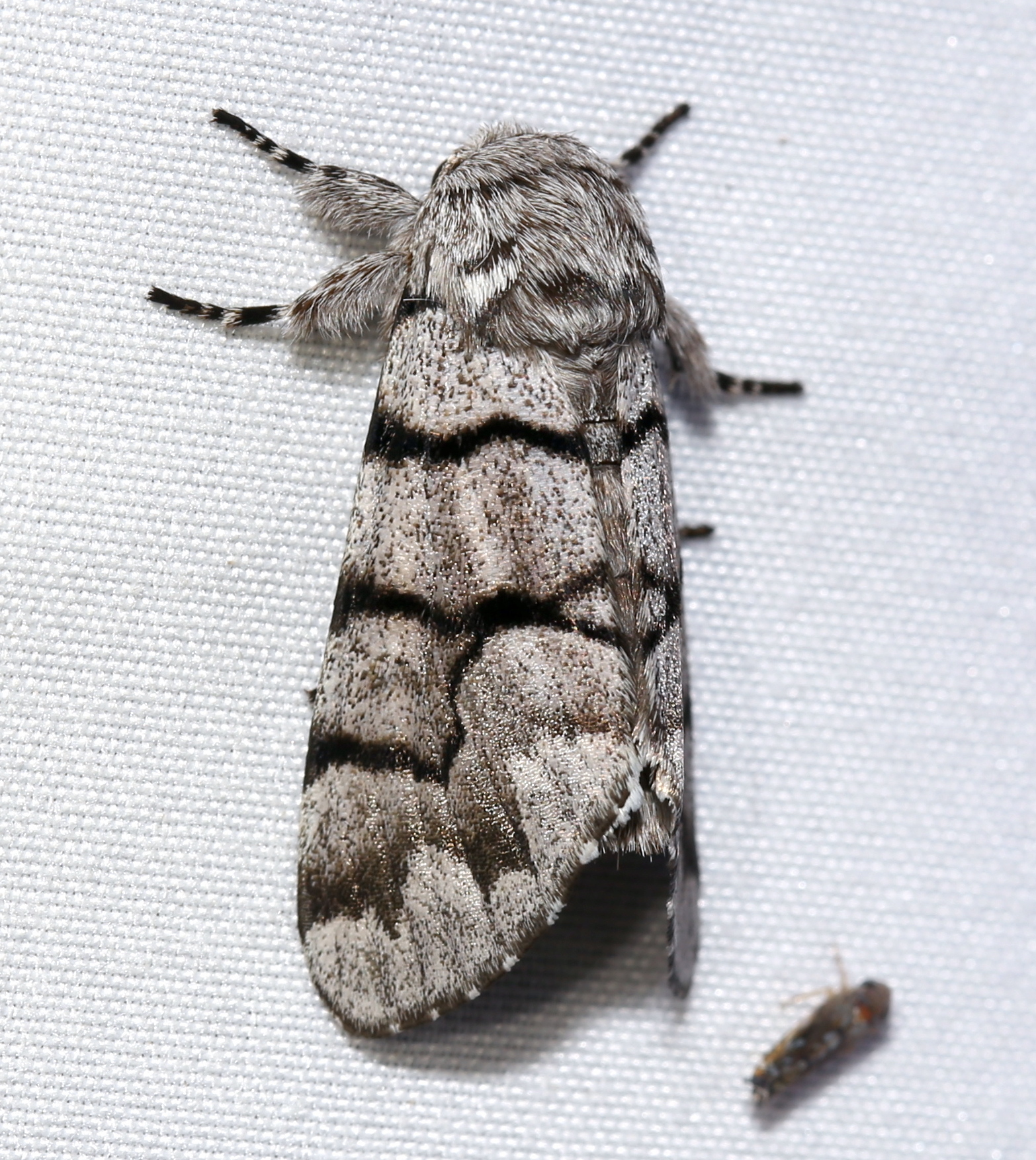

Scientific classification
- Kingdom: Animalia
- Phylum: Arthropoda
- Clade: Pancrustacea
- Class: Insecta
- Order: Lepidoptera
- Superfamily: Noctuoidea
- Family: Noctuidae
- Genus: Panthea
- Species: P. furcilla

Binomial name
- Panthea furcilla (Packard, 1864)

Synonyms
- Platycerura furcilla; Panthea pallescens McDunnough, 1937; Panthea atrescens McDunnough, 1942 (form); Panthea centralis McDunnough, 1942

= Panthea furcilla =

Species of moth

Panthea furcilla (tufted white pine caterpillar or eastern panthea) is a species of moth of the family Noctuidae. It is found across the boreal forest region of Canada west to the Rocky Mountains, and in the eastern parts of the United States, from Maine to Florida, west to Texas, north to Indiana and Ohio.

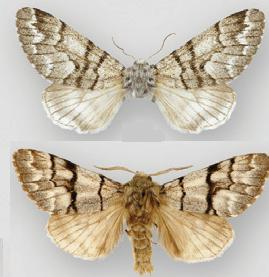
Panthea furcilla furcilla female (top), male (bottom)

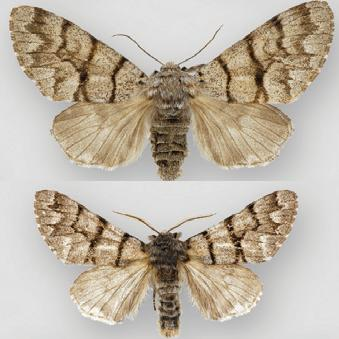
Panthea furcilla australis female (top), male (bottom)

It has a wingspan of 33–50 mm. The moth flies from June to August in a single brood in Canada, but in two or more generations in the southern United States, depending on the location.

The larvae feed on eastern larch, pines, and Spruces.

== Subspecies ==
There are two recognised subspecies:

- Panthea furcilla australis Anweiler, 2009
- Panthea furcilla furcilla (Packard, 1864)

The supposed species P. pallescens is today considered a form of P. furcilla with no taxonomic standing.
