= Lanatopyga =

Scientific classification
- Kingdom: Animalia
- Phylum: Arthropoda
- Class: Insecta
- Order: Lepidoptera
- Superfamily: Noctuoidea
- Family: Noctuidae
- Subfamily: Xyleninae
- Genus: Lanatopyga; Gyulai & Ronkay, 2002

Genus of moths

Lanatopyga is a genus of moths of the family Noctuidae.

== Species ==
- Lanatopyga ronkaygabori Gyulai & Ronkay, 2002
