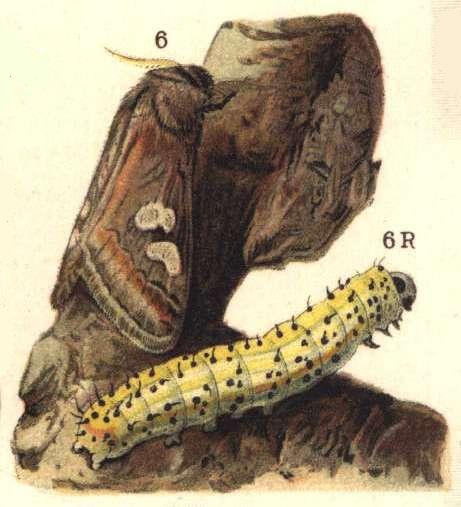

Scientific classification
- Domain: Eukaryota
- Kingdom: Animalia
- Phylum: Arthropoda
- Class: Insecta
- Order: Lepidoptera
- Superfamily: Noctuoidea
- Family: Noctuidae
- Subfamily: Dilobinae; Aurivillius, 1889
- Genus: Diloba; Boisduval, 1840

= Diloba =

Genus of moths

Diloba is a genus of moths of the family Noctuidae. It is the only genus in subfamily Dilobinae.

== Species ==
- Diloba caeruleocephala – figure of eight moth Linnaeus, 1758
