= Stiriina =

Former subtribe of moths

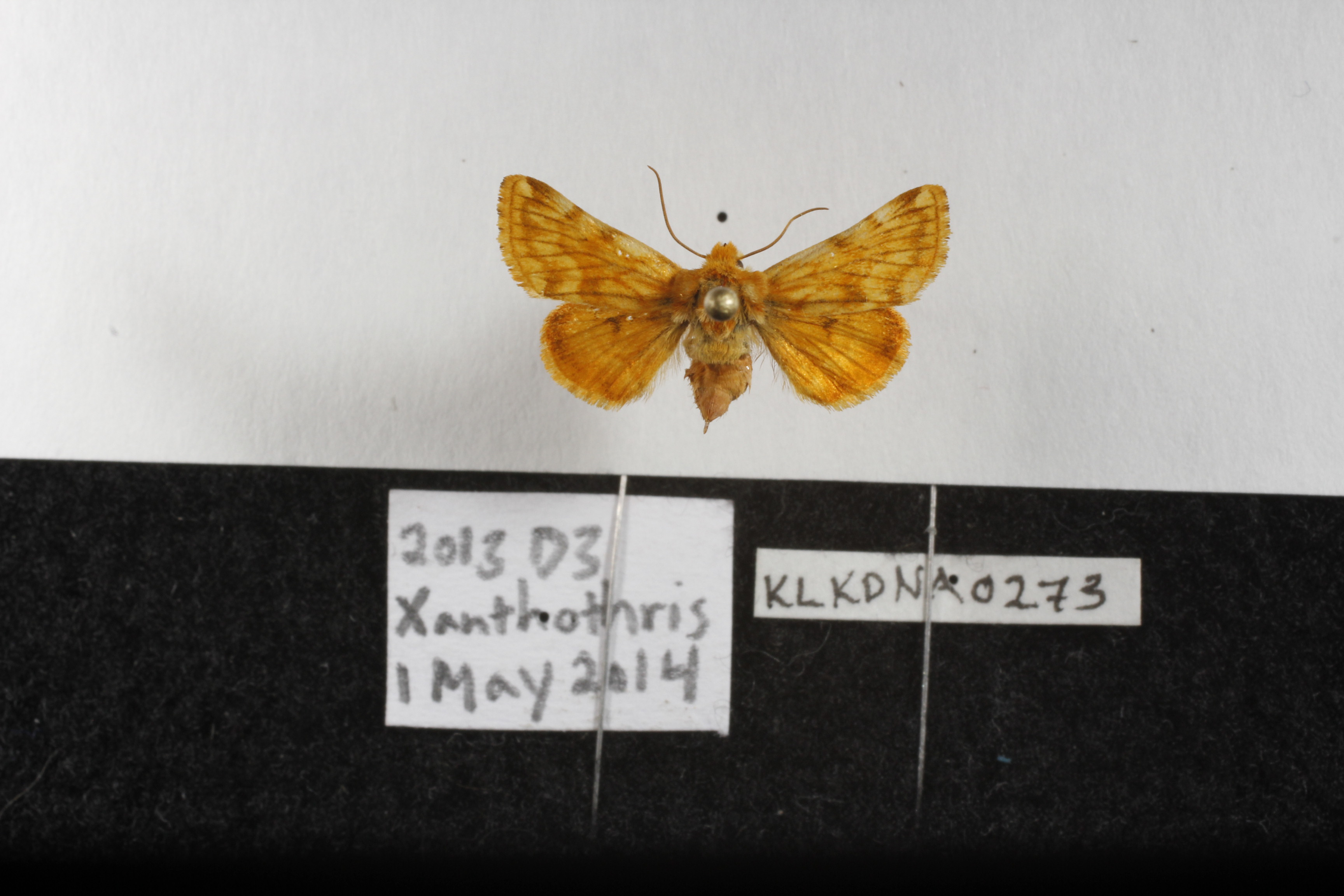
Xanthothrix neumoegeni

Stiriina is the name of a former subtribe of moths in the Noctuidae family. It was elevated in rank to the subfamily Stiriinae as a result of phylogenetic research published in 2019 by Keegan, et al.
