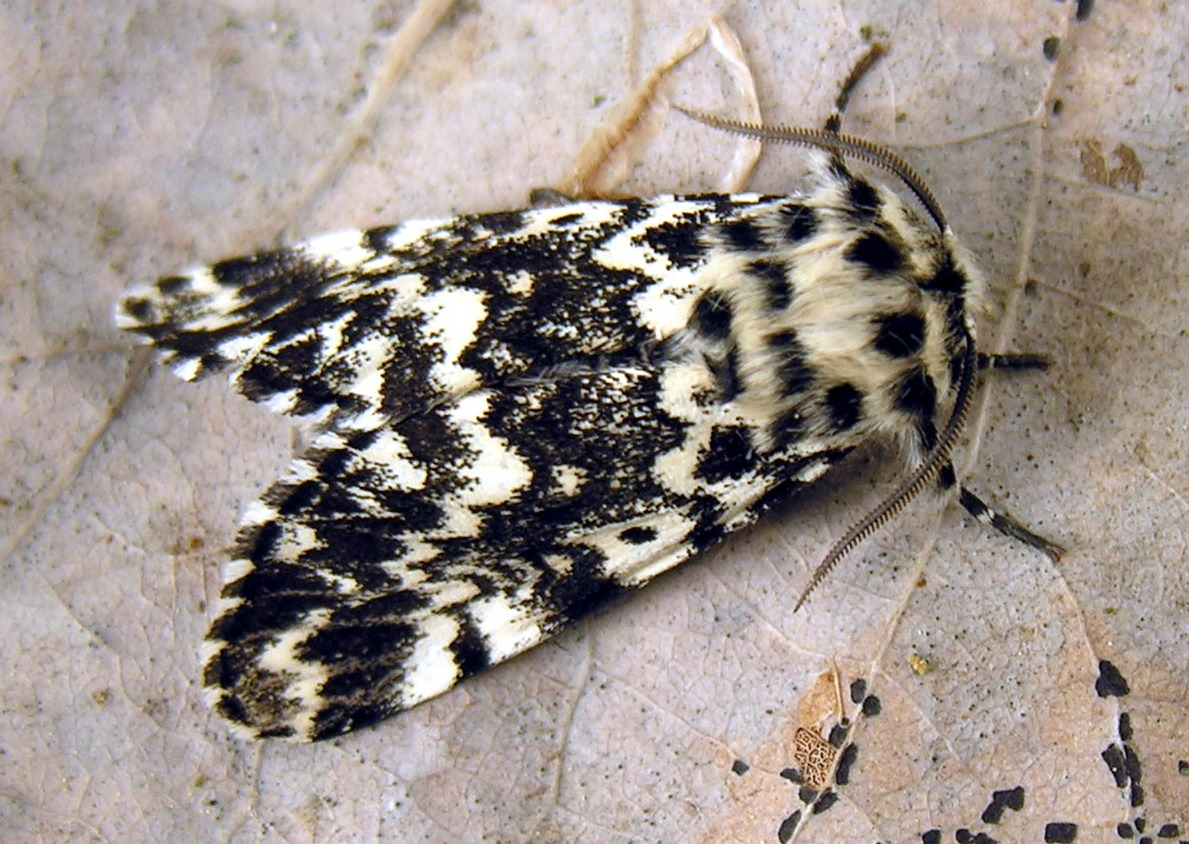

Scientific classification
- Kingdom: Animalia
- Phylum: Arthropoda
- Class: Insecta
- Order: Lepidoptera
- Superfamily: Noctuoidea
- Family: Noctuidae
- Genus: Panthea
- Species: P. coenobita

Binomial name
- Panthea coenobita (Esper, 1785)

Synonyms
- Phalaena Bombyx coenobita Esper, 1785; Bombyx coenobita Esper, 1785; Panthea coenobita f. latefasciata; Panthea coenobita ssp. ussuriensis; Panthea coenobita f. kotschubeyi; Panthea coenobita f. immaculata; Panthea coenobita idae

= Panthea coenobita =

Species of moth

Panthea coenobita is a species of moth of the family Noctuidae. It is found in North Europe, East Europe and Southern Europe, the central and northern European part of Russia, Japan, Korea, northern China, the Russian Far East (Primorye, Khabarovsk, Amur region, Sakhalin, southern Kuriles), southern and western Siberia (Transbaikalia, Baikal area, Altai) and Turkey.

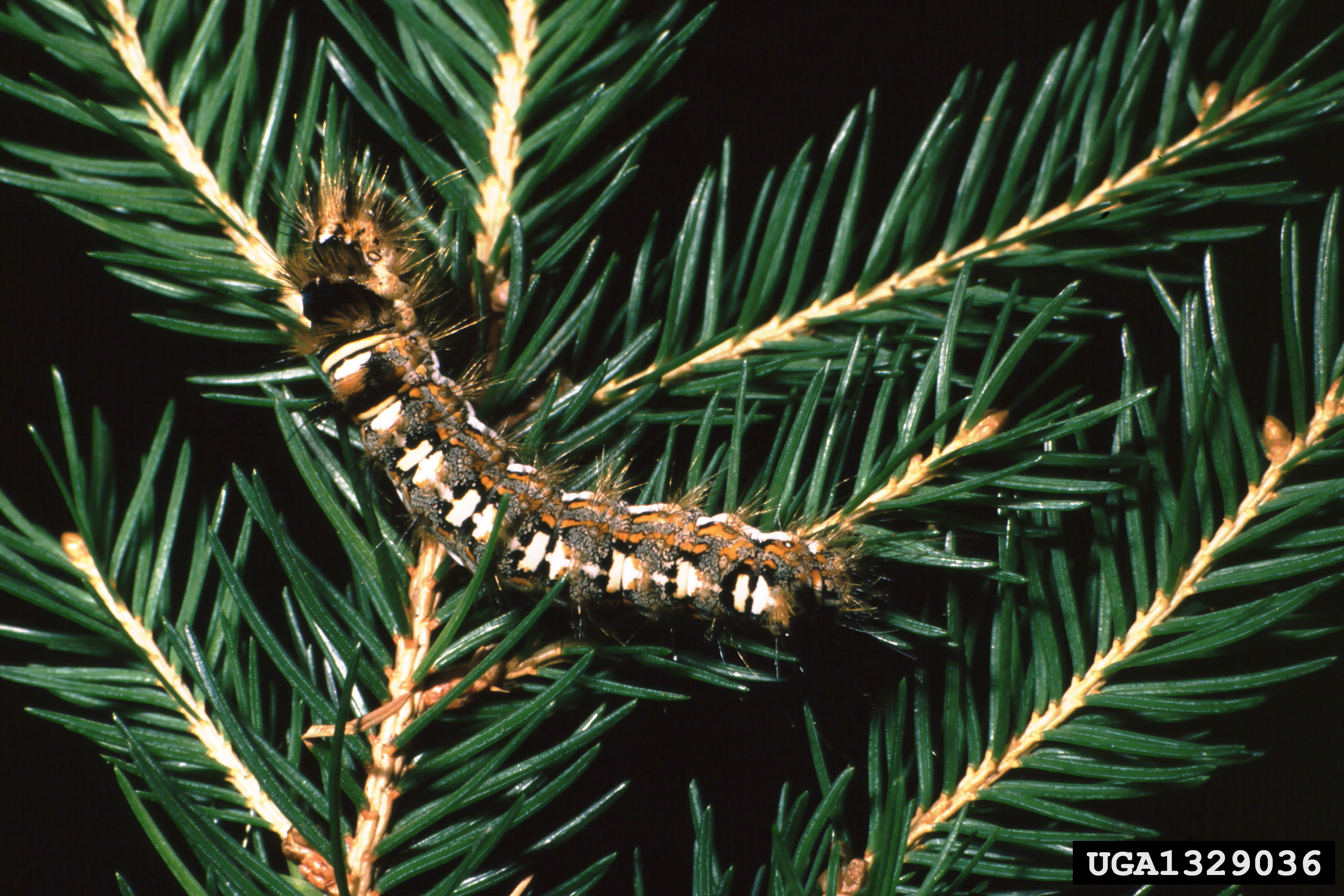
Caterpillar

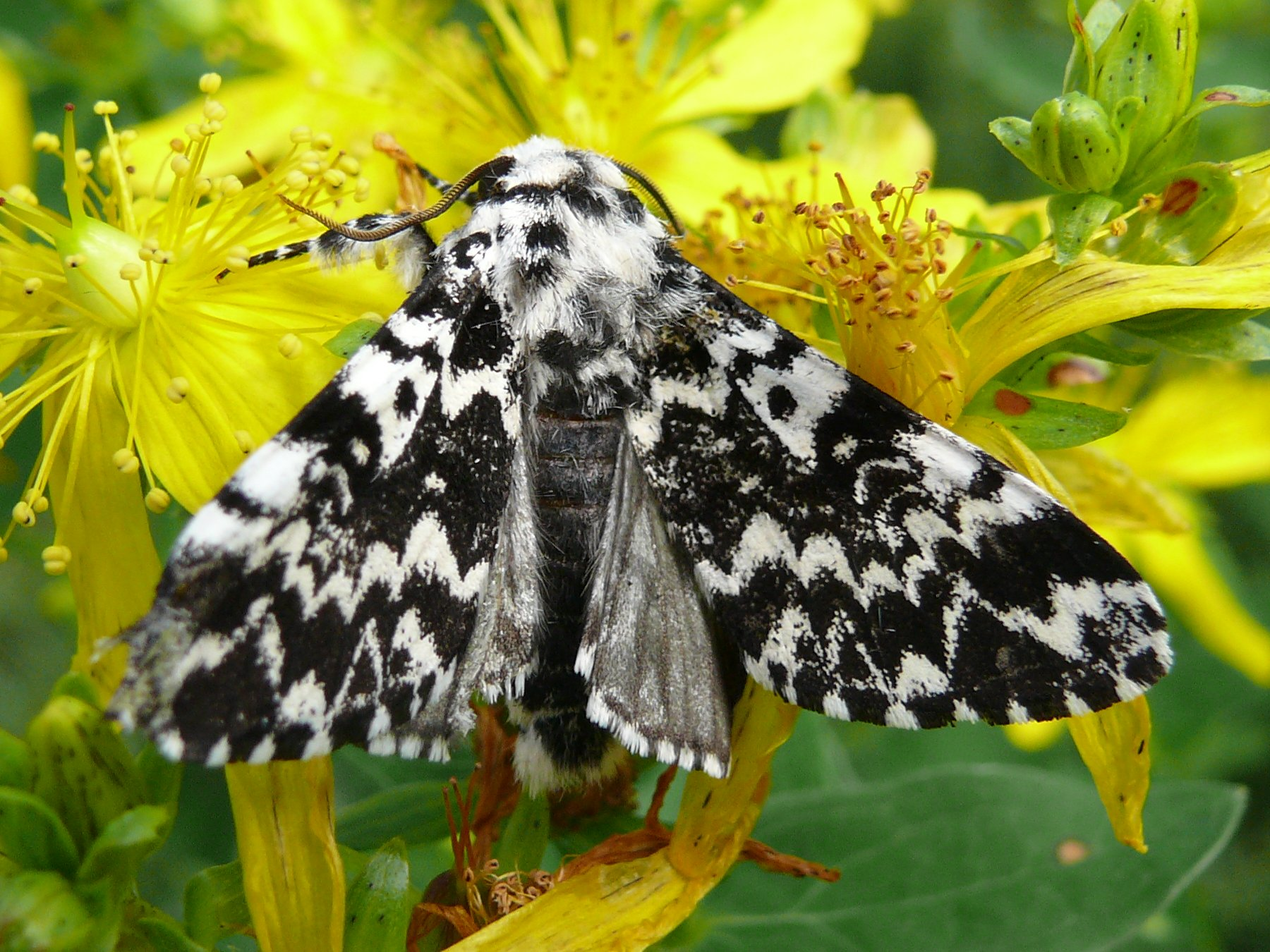

The wingspan is 40–50 mm. The moth flies from May to July depending on the location.

The larvae feed on Pine, Fir and Larch.
