= Protapamea =

Scientific classification
- Domain: Eukaryota
- Kingdom: Animalia
- Phylum: Arthropoda
- Class: Insecta
- Order: Lepidoptera
- Superfamily: Noctuoidea
- Family: Noctuidae
- Tribe: Apameini
- Genus: Protapamea; Quinter, 2009

Genus of moths

Protapamea is a genus of moths of the family Noctuidae. It is endemic to the United States.

== Species ==
There are two recognized species:

- Protapamea danieli Quinter, 2009
- Protapamea louisae Quinter, 2009
