= Azeniina =

Scientific classification
- Kingdom: Animalia
- Phylum: Arthropoda
- Clade: Pancrustacea
- Class: Insecta
- Order: Lepidoptera
- Superfamily: Noctuoidea
- Family: Noctuidae
- Subfamily: Stiriinae
- Tribe: Stiriini
- Subtribe: Azeniina; Poole, 1995

Subtribe of moths

Azeniina is a subtribe of owlet moths in the family Noctuidae. There are at least 10 described species in Azeniina.

== Genera ==
- Aleptinoides Barnes & McDunnough, 1912
- Azenia Grote, 1882
- Narthecophora Smith, 1900
- Tristyla Smith, 1893
