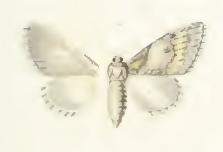
- Raphia hybris

Scientific classification
- Kingdom: Animalia
- Phylum: Arthropoda
- Class: Insecta
- Order: Lepidoptera
- Superfamily: Noctuoidea
- Family: Noctuidae
- Subfamily: Raphiinae; Beck, 1996
- Genus: Raphia; Hübner, 1821

Synonyms
- Certila Walker, 1865; Saligena Walker, 1865; Anodonta Rambur, 1858 (preoccup. Lamarck, 1799)

= Raphia (moth) =

Genus of moths

Raphia is a genus of moths of the family Noctuidae. It is the only genus under subfamily Raphiinae. They occur in southern Europe, temperate Asia, and North America.

== Species ==
- Raphia aethiops
- Raphia approximata
- Raphia corax
- Raphia frater Grote, 1864
- Raphia hybris Hübner, 1813
- Raphia illarioni
- Raphia obsoleta
- Raphia peusteria Püngeler, 1907
