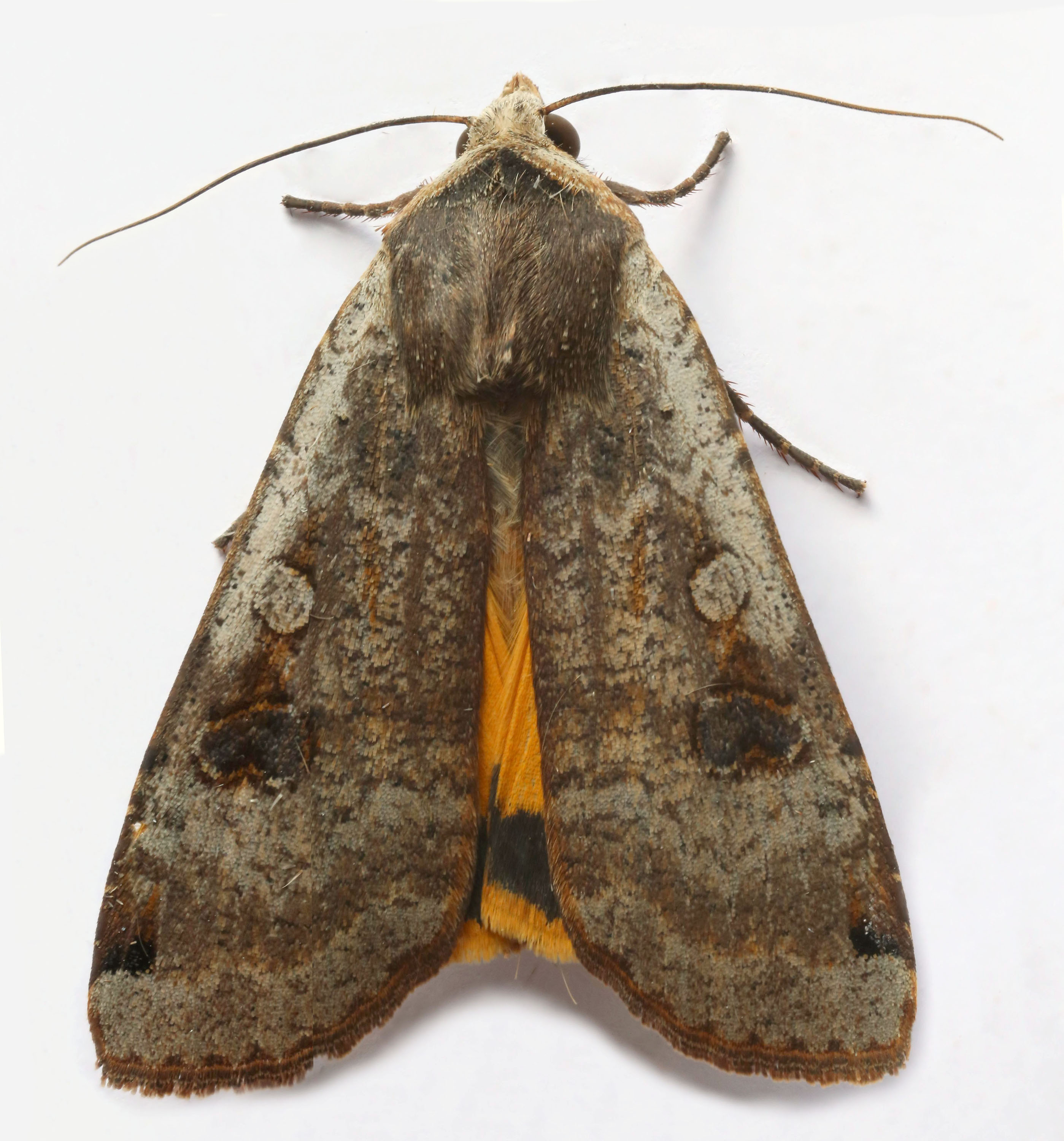
- Noctua pronuba
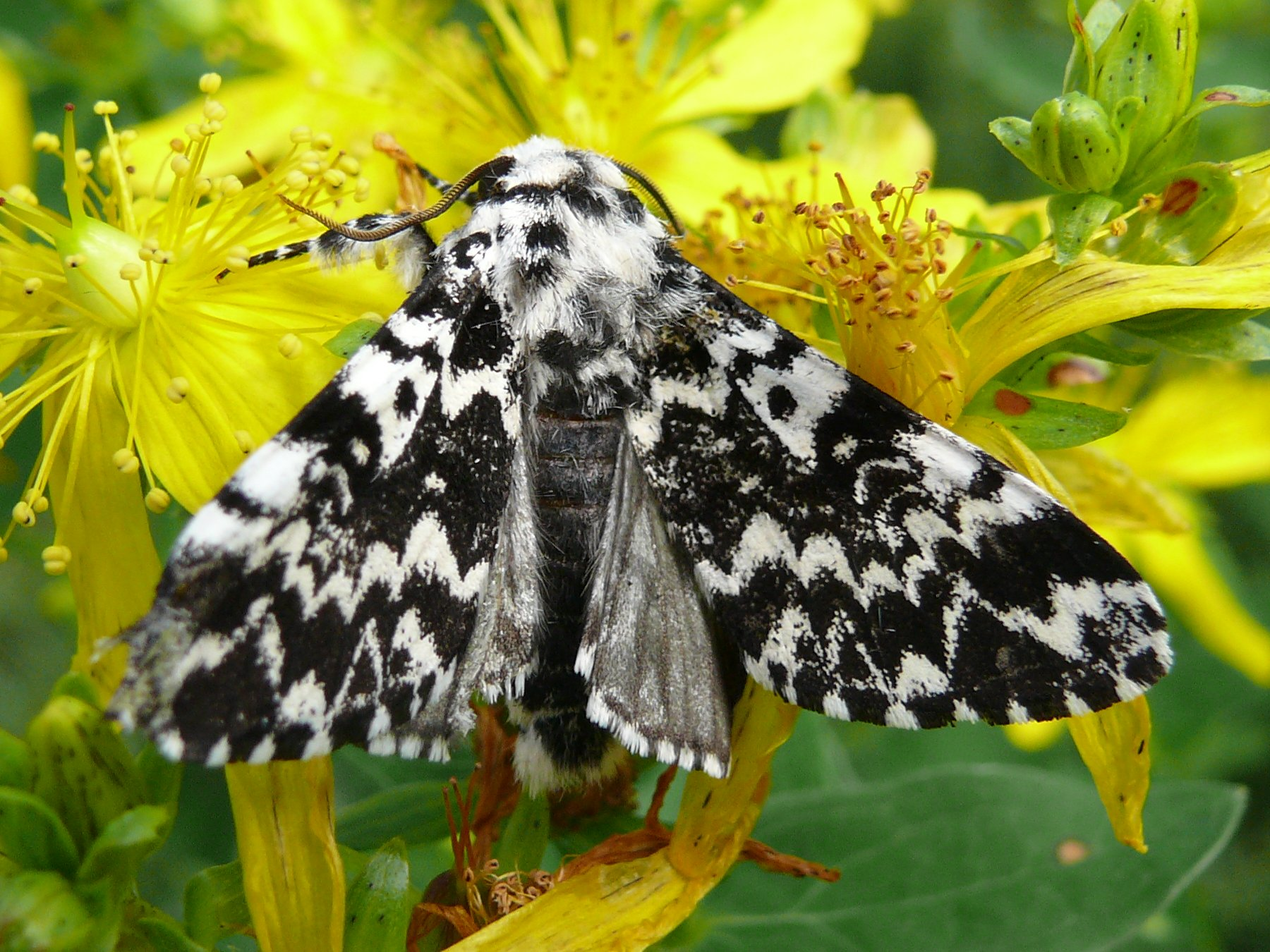
- Panthea coenobita

Scientific classification
- Kingdom: Animalia
- Phylum: Arthropoda
- Clade: Pancrustacea
- Class: Insecta
- Order: Lepidoptera
- Superfamily: Noctuoidea
- Family: Noctuidae; Latreille, 1809

Type species
- Noctua pronuba

Subfamilies
- Acontiinae Guenée, 1841 Acronictinae Harris, 1841 Aediinae Agaristinae Boisduval, 1833 Amphipyrinae Guenée, 1837 Bagisarinae Crumb, 1956 Balsinae Grote, 1896 Bryophilinae Guenée, 1852 Cobubathinae Wagner & Keegan, 2021 Condicinae Poole, 1995 Cropiinae Keegan & Wagner, 2021 Cuculliinae Herrich-Schäffer, 1850 Dilobinae Dyopsinae Eriopinae Herrich-Schäffer, 1851 Eucocytiinae Eustrotiinae Grote, 1882 Grotellinae Heliothinae Boisduval, 1828 Metoponiinae Herrich-Schäffer, 1851 Noctuinae Latreille, 1809 Oncocnemidinae Forbes & Franclemont, 1954 Pantheinae Smith, 1898 Plusiinae Boisduval, 1828 Raphiinae Beck, 1996 Stiriinae

Diversity
- About 11,772 species

= Noctuidae =

Noctuid moths

Family of moths

The Noctuidae, commonly known as noctuid moths or owlet moths, and their caterpillars as cutworms or armyworms, are a family of moths. Taxonomically, they are considered the most difficult family in the superfamily Noctuoidea because the classification of many of the clades is constantly changing with new research, along with that of other families of the Noctuoidea. It was considered the largest family in Lepidoptera for a long time, but after regrouping Lymantriinae, Catocalinae and Calpinae within the family Erebidae, the latter holds this title now. Currently, Noctuidae is the second largest family in Noctuoidea, with about 1,089 genera and 11,772 species. This classification is still unsettled, as more changes continue to appear between Noctuidae and Erebidae.

== Description ==
Noctuidae wing venation (highlighting features specific to subfamily Pantheinae)

Adult: Most noctuid adults have wings with a variety of shades of brown, grey, and other varied shades and colours but some subfamilies, such as Acronictinae and Agaristinae, are very brightly coloured, especially those from tropical regions (e.g. Baorisa hieroglyphica). They are characterised by a structure in the metathorax called the nodular sclerite or epaulette, which separates the tympanum and the conjunctiva in the tympanal organ. It functions to keep parasites (Acari) out of the tympanal cavity. Another characteristic in this group is trifine hindwing venation, by reduction or absence of the second medial vein (M2).

Markings present on the wings of noctuid adults can be helpful in distinguishing species. From the basal location to the outer edge (proximal to distal) on the forewing, there is a horizontally oriented claviform (club-shaped) stigma located posterior to a discal (round) stigma. These are followed distally by a reniform (kidney-shaped) stigma, whose exact shape may vary, but is found on the distal edge of the forewing's cell. It is often not possible to discern all of the stigmata on all specimens or species. Crossbands or crosslines may be present, oriented longitudinally from the leading to the trailing edge of the wing.

Larva: Commonly green or brown; some species present bright colours, such as the camphorweed cucullia moth (Cucullia alfarata). Most are pudgy and smooth with rounded short heads and few setae, but there are some exceptions in some subfamilies (e.g. Acronictinae and Pantheinae).

The pupae range from shiny brown to dark brown. When they newly pupate they are bright brownish orange, but after a few days start to get darker.

The eggs vary in colour, but all have a spherical shape.

== Etymology ==
The word Noctuidae is derived from the name of the type genus Noctua, which is the Latin name for the little owl, and the patronymic suffix -idae used typically to form taxonomic family names in animals.

The common name "owlet" originally means a small or young owl. The names "armyworms" and "cutworms" are based on the behaviour of the larvae of this group, which can occur in destructive swarms and cut the stems of plants.

== Ecology ==
=== Distribution and diversity ===
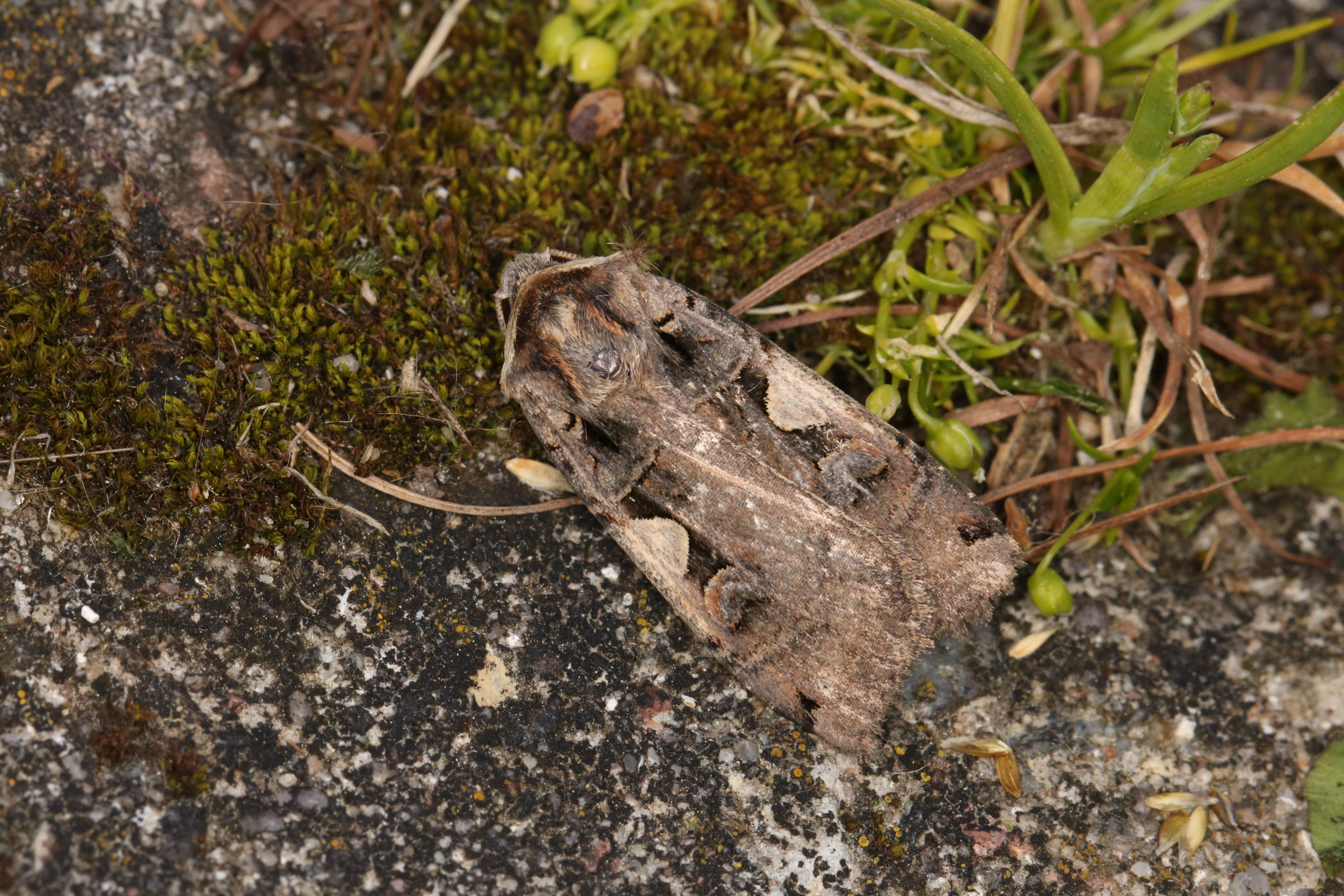
Setaceous Hebrew character

This family is cosmopolitan and can be found worldwide except in the Antarctic region. Some species, such as the setaceous Hebrew character (Xestia c-nigrum), can be found in the Arctic Circle, specifically in the Yukon territory of western Canada, with an elevation 1,702 m above sea level, where the temperature fluctuates between 23/-25 °C (73/-13 °F). Many species of dart moths have been recorded in elevations as high as 4,000 m above sea level (e.g. Xestia elisabetha). Among the places where the number of species has been counted are North America and northern Mexico, with about 2,522 species. 1,576 species are found in Europe, while the other species are distributed worldwide.

=== Mutualism ===
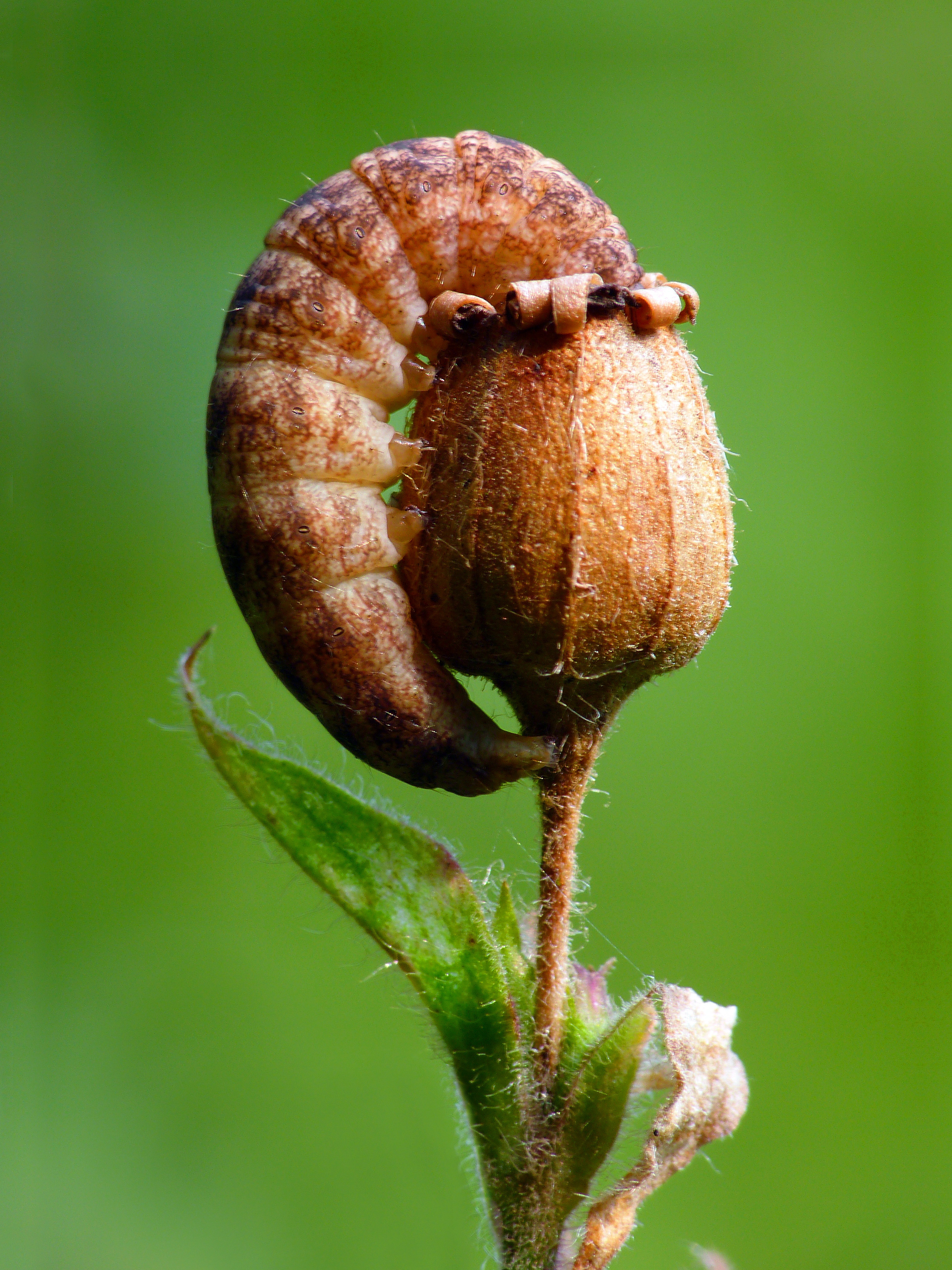
A Lychnis moth caterpillar feeding on the seeds of red campion (Silene dioica).

Members of Noctuidae, like other butterflies and moths, perform an important role in plant pollination. Some species have developed a stronger connection with their host plants. For example, the lychnis moth (Hadena bicruris) has a strange mutualistic relationship with pink plants or carnation plants (Caryophyllaceae), in that larvae feed on the plant while the adults pollinate the flowers.

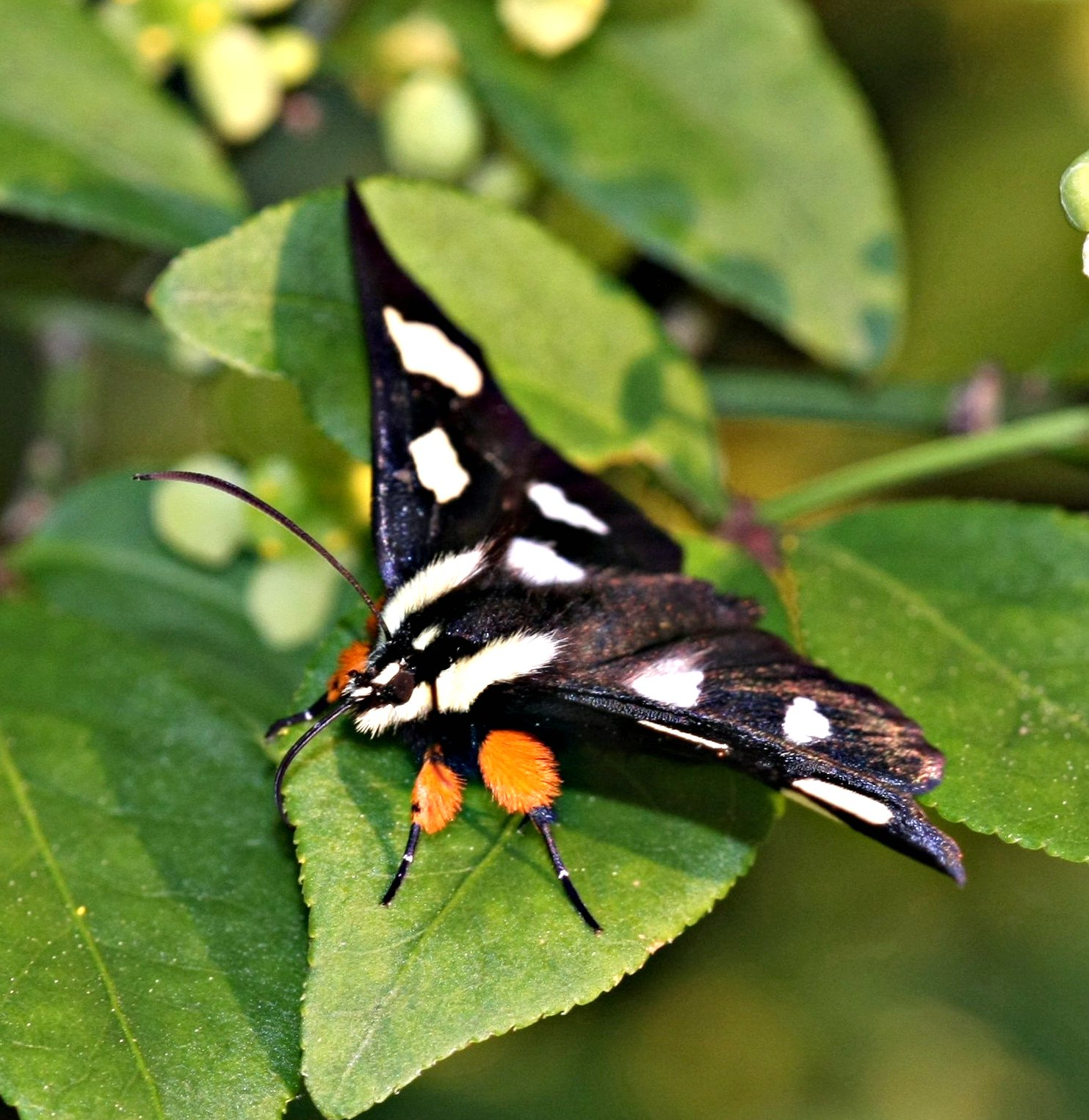
The eight-spotted forester moth (Alypia octomaculata) puddling on water from a leaf of firebush (Croton lucidus).

=== Food guilds ===
Herbivory: Caterpillars of most Noctuidae feed on plants; some feed on poisonous plants and are unaffected by their chemical defences; for example, the splendid brocade moth (Lacanobia splendens) feeds on cowbane (Cicuta virosa), a plant that is notoriously toxic to vertebrates.

Predation and cannibalism: During the larval stage, some cutworms readily feed on other insects. One such species is the shivering pinion (Lithophane querquera), whose larvae commonly feed on other lepidopteran larvae. Moreover, many noctuid larvae, such as those of the fall armyworm (Spodoptera frugiperda) and of genera such as Heliothis and Helicoverpa, aggressively eat their siblings and often other species of caterpillar.

Nectarivory and puddling: Like many Lepidoptera, many species of adult Noctuidae visit flowers for their nectar. They also seek other liquid food resources such as plant juices, honeydew, dung, urea and mud, among others.

=== Reproduction ===
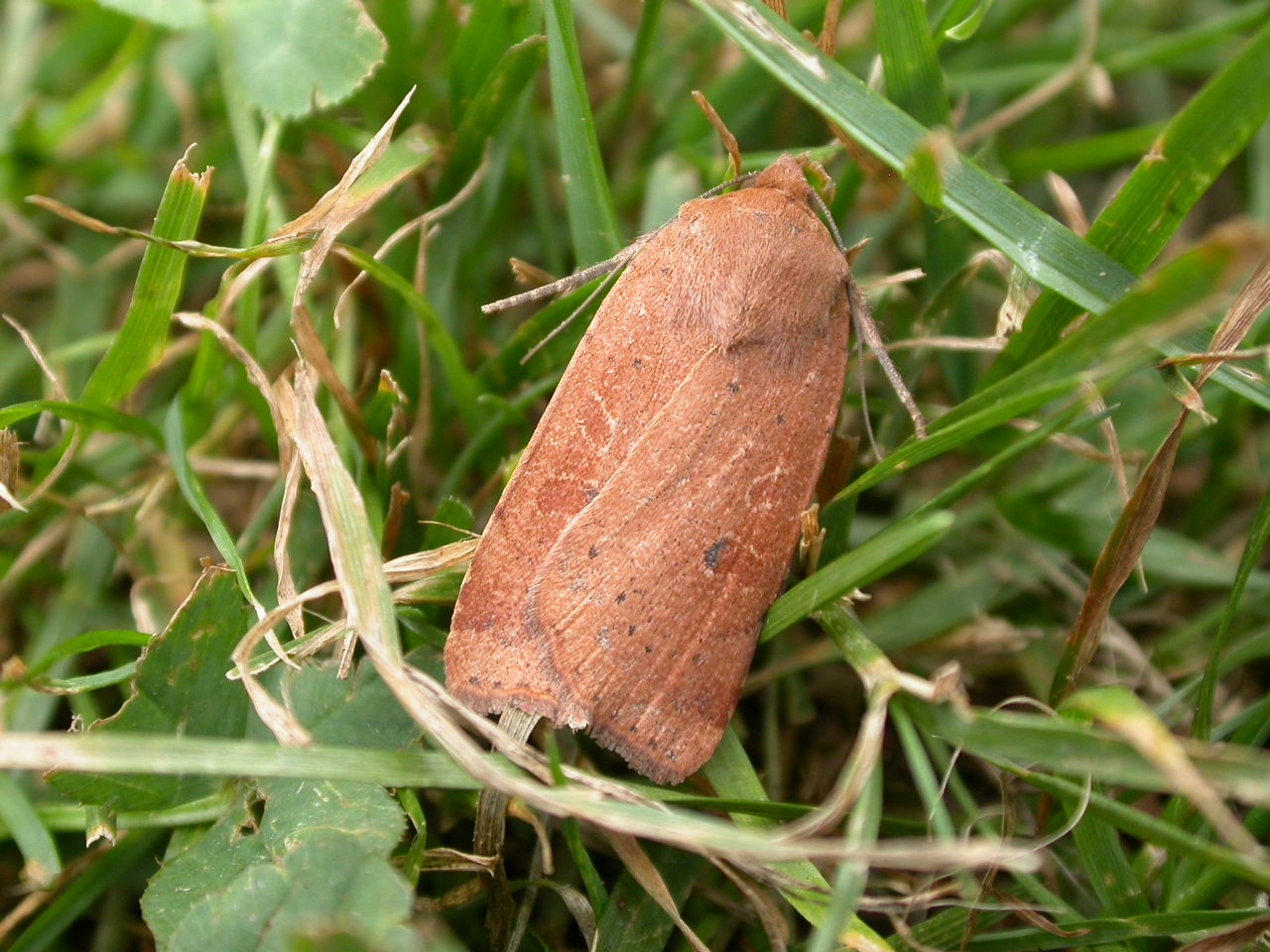
Lesser yellow underwing

Noctuid moths commonly begin the reproductive season from spring to fall, and mostly are multivoltine, such as the eastern panthea moth (Panthea furcilla), which reproduces over the year. Nevertheless, some species have just one brood of offspring (univoltine); among the best known is the lesser yellow underwing (Noctua comes).

As is common in members of the order Lepidoptera, courtship in many Noctuidae includes a set of movements in which the female evaluates the male's reproductive fitness.

Most noctuid moths produce pheromones that attract the opposite sex. Female pheromones that attract males occur widely and have long been studied, but the study of male pheromones has further to go.

=== Defence ===
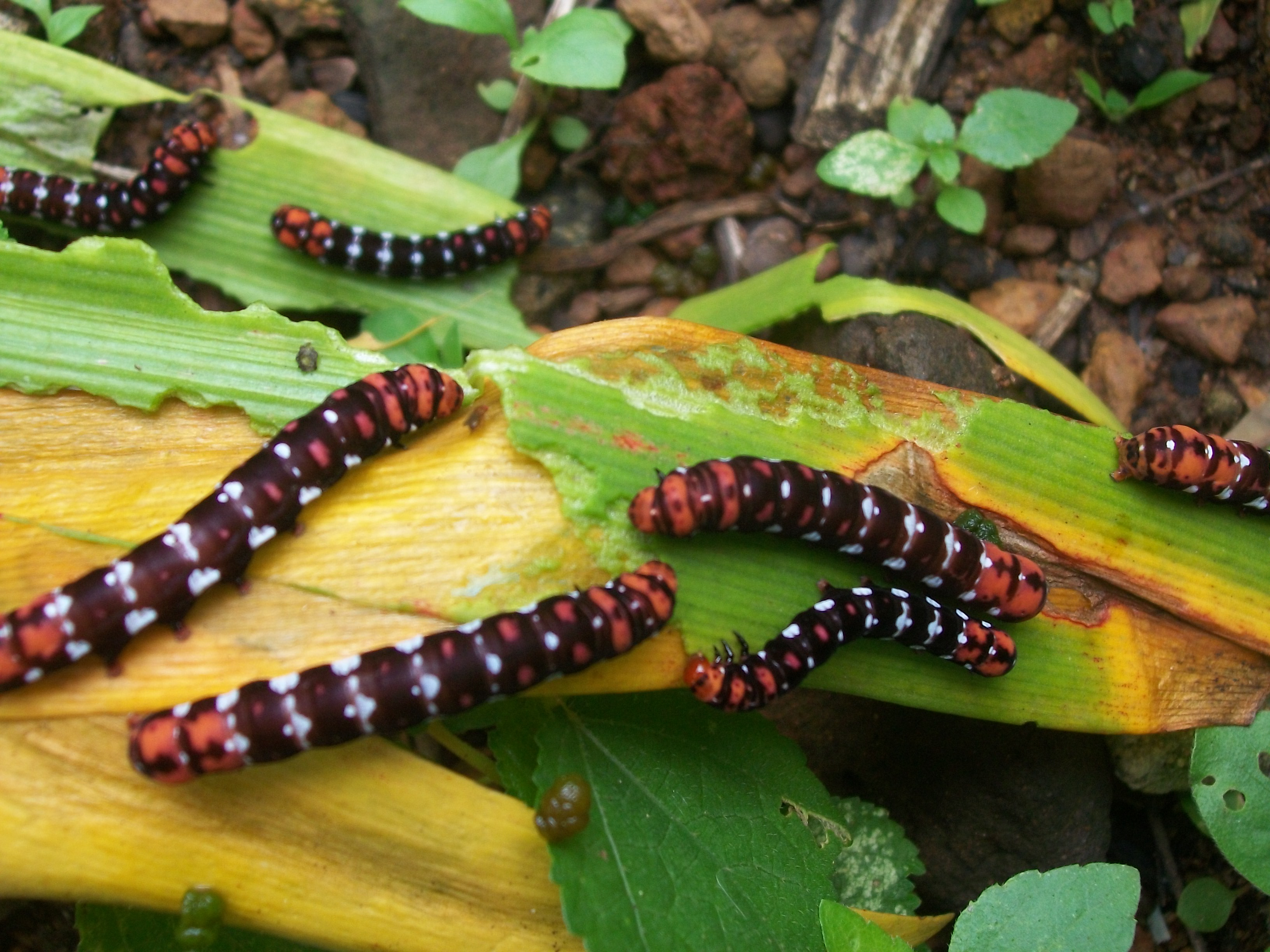
Polytela gloriosae caterpillars feeding on Amaryllis sp.

This group has a wide range of both chemical and physical defence. Among the chemical defences three types stand out. First, the pyrrolizidine alkaloid sequestration usually present in Arctiinae is also found in a few species of noctuids, including the Spanish moth (Xanthopastis timais). Another chemical defence is formic acid production, which was thought to be present only in Notodontidae, but later was found in caterpillars of Trachosea champa. Finally, the last type of chemical defence is regurgitation of plant compounds, often used by many insects, but the cabbage palm caterpillar (Litoprosopus futilis) produces a toxin called toluquinone that deters predators.

On the other hand, the main physical defence in caterpillars and adults alike is mimicry. Most noctuid moths have drab colours with a variety of patterns suitable to camouflage their bodies. The second physical defence consists in thousands of secondary setae that surround the body. The subfamilies that present this mechanism are Pantheinae and Acronictinae. The third is aposematism, represented by species of Cucullinae. Finally, all adults have another mechanism for defence, a tympanal organ available to detect the echolocation produced by bats, so the moths can avoid them.

== Human importance ==
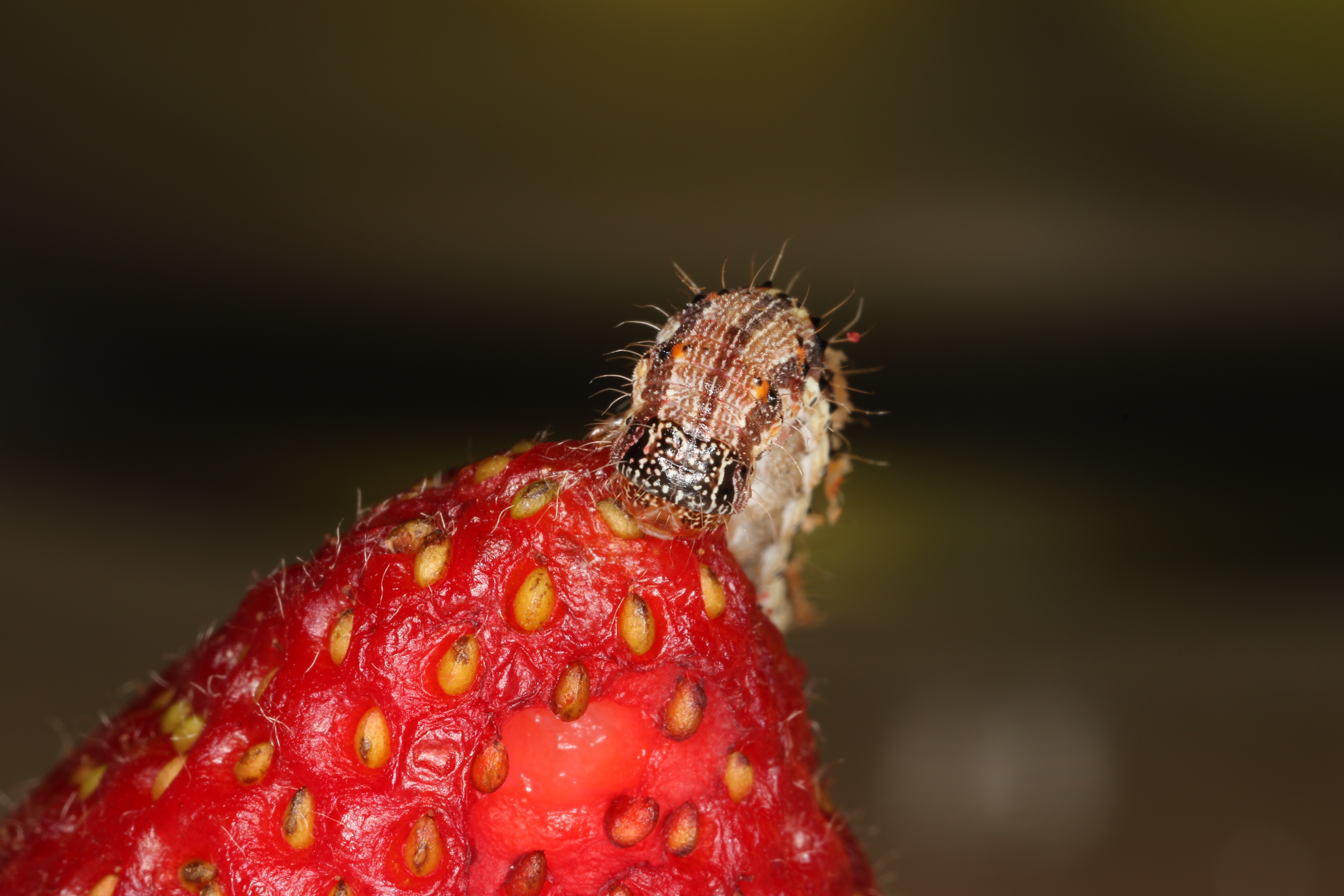
A Helicoverpa armigera caterpillar feeding on a strawberry.

=== Agriculture ===
Many species are considered agricultural problems around the world. Their larvae are typically known as "cutworms" or "armyworms" due to swarms that destroy crops, orchards and gardens every year. The scarce bordered straw Helicoverpa armigera produces losses in agriculture every year that exceed US$2 billion. Additionally, the variegated cutworm (Peridroma saucia) is described by many as one of the most damaging pests to vegetables.

In West Africa, species including Busseola fusca, Heliocheilus albipunctella, Sesamia calamistis, Helicoverpa armigera, and Spodoptera exempta are major pests of staple crops such as pearl millet, sorghum, and maize.

== Systematics ==
Since molecular analysis began to play a larger role in systematics, the structure of many Lepidoptera groups has been changing and Noctuidae is not an exception. Most recent studies have shown that Noctuidae sensu stricto is a monophyletic group, mainly based on trifine venation. Some clades within Noctuidae sensu lato have yet to be studied. This taxonomic division represents the subfamilies, tribes and subtribes considered so far.

Family Noctuidae Latreille, 1809
Subfamily Acontiinae Guenée, 1841

Tribe Acontiini Guenée, 1841
Tribe Armadini
Tribe Chamaecleini

Subfamily Acronictinae Harris, 1841
Subfamily Aediinae
Subfamily Agaristinae Boisduval, 1833
Subfamily Amphipyrinae Guenée, 1837

Tribe Amphipyrini Guenée, 1837
Tribe Psaphidini Grote, 1896

Subtribe Feraliina Poole, 1995
Subtribe Nocloina Poole, 1995
Subtribe Psaphidina Grote, 1896
Subtribe Triocnemidina Poole, 1995

Subfamily Bagisarinae Crumb, 1956
Subfamily Balsinae Grote, 1896
Subfamily Bryophilinae Guenée, 1852
Subfamily Cobubathinae Wagner & Keegan, 2021
Subfamily Condicinae Poole, 1995

Tribe Condicini Poole, 1995
Tribe Leuconyctini Poole, 1995

Subfamily Cropiinae Keegan & Wagner, 2021
Subfamily Cuculliinae Herrich-Schäffer, 1850
Subfamily Dilobinae
Subfamily Dyopsinae
Subfamily Eriopinae Herrich-Schäffer, 1851
Subfamily Eucocytiinae
Subfamily Eustrotiinae Grote, 1882
Subfamily Grotellinae
Subfamily Heliothinae Boisduval, 1828
Subfamily Metoponiinae Herrich-Schäffer, 1851

Tribe Cydosiini Kitching & Rawlins, 1998

Subfamily Noctuinae Latreille, 1809

Tribe Actinotiini Beck, 1996
Tribe Apameini Guenée, 1841
Tribe Arzamini Grote, 1883
Tribe Caradrinini Boisduval, 1840

Subtribe Athetiina Fibiger & Lafontaine, 2005
Subtribe Caradrinina Boisduval, 1840

Tribe Dypterygiini Forbes, 1954
Tribe Elaphriini Beck, 1996
Tribe Episemini
Tribe Eriopygini Fibiger & Lafontaine, 2005
Tribe Glottulini Guenée, 1852
Tribe Hadenini Guenée, 1837
Tribe Leucaniini Guenée, 1837
Tribe Noctuini Latreille, 1809

Subtribe Agrotina Harris, 1841
Subtribe Axyliina
Subtribe Noctuina Latreille, 1809

Tribe Orthosiini Guenée, 1837
Tribe Phlogophorini Hampson, 1918
Tribe Phosphilini Poole, 1995
Tribe Prodeniini Forbes, 1954
Tribe Pseudeustrotiini Beck, 1996
Tribe Tholerini Beck, 1996
Tribe Xylenini Guenée, 1837

Subtribe Antitypina Forbes & Franclemont, 1954
Subtribe Cosmiina Guenée, 1852
Subtribe Ufeina Crumb, 1956
Subtribe Xylenina Guenée, 1837

Subfamily Oncocnemidinae Forbes & Franclemont, 1954
Subfamily Pantheinae Smith, 1898
Subfamily Plusiinae Boisduval, 1828

Tribe Abrostolini Eichlin & Cunningham, 1978
Tribe Argyrogrammatini Eichlin & Cunningham, 1978
Tribe Plusiini Boisduval, 1828

Subtribe Autoplusiina Kitching, 1987
Subtribe Euchalciina Chou & Lu, 1979
Subtribe Plusiina Boisduval, 1828

Subfamily Raphiinae
Subfamily Stiriinae

Tribe Annaphilini
Tribe Stiriini Grote, 1882

Subtribe Annaphilina Mustelin, 2006
Subtribe Azeniina Poole, 1995
Subtribe Grotellina Poole, 1995
Subtribe Stiriina Grote, 1882

Genera with intervening taxonomy not available include:

- Alastria
- Epilitha
- Fabula
- Lanatopyga
- Lenisa
- Neoligia
- Orohadena
- Orthomoia
- Protapamea
- Proxenus
- Pseudluperina
