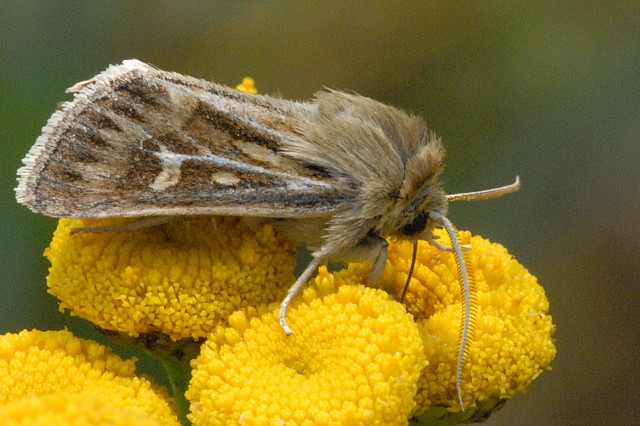
- Cerapteryx graminis

Scientific classification
- Domain: Eukaryota
- Kingdom: Animalia
- Phylum: Arthropoda
- Class: Insecta
- Order: Lepidoptera
- Superfamily: Noctuoidea
- Family: Noctuidae
- Subfamily: Noctuinae
- Tribe: Tholerini
- Genus: Cerapteryx; Curtis, 1833

= Cerapteryx =

Genus of moths

Cerapteryx is a genus of moths of the family Noctuidae.

== Species ==
- Cerapteryx graminis – antler moth (Linnaeus, 1758)
- Cerapteryx megala (Alphéraky, 1882)
