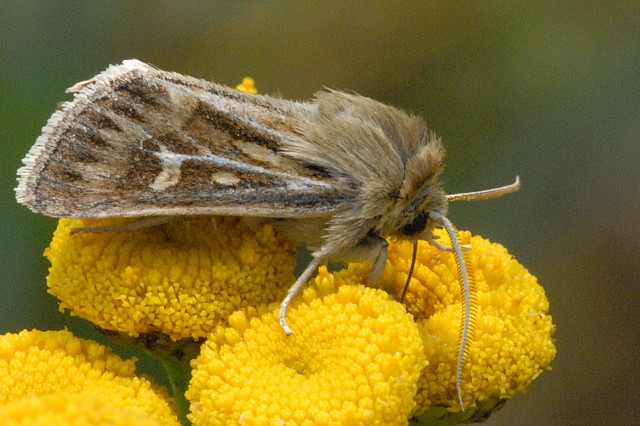

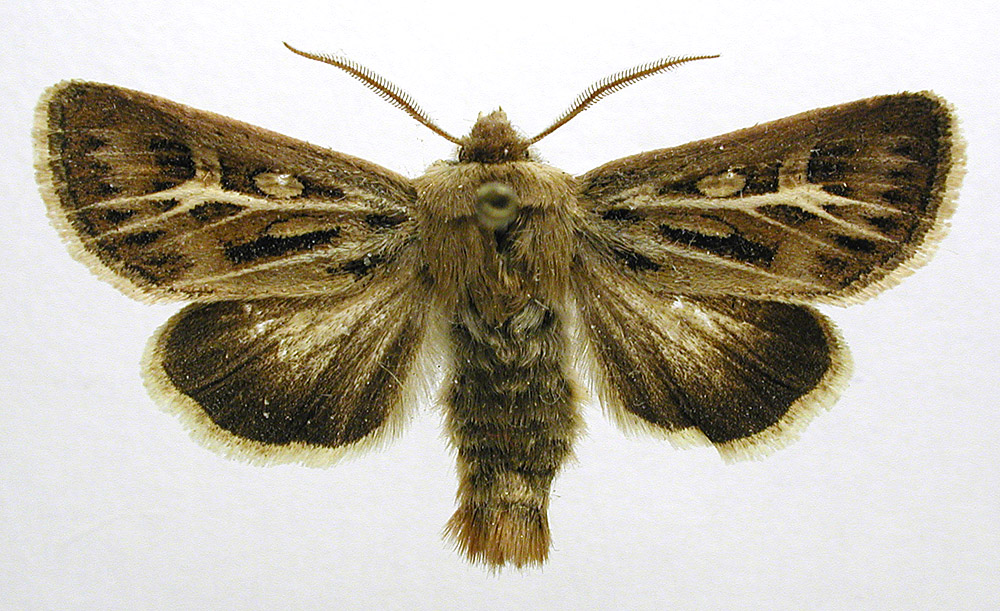

Scientific classification
- Kingdom: Animalia
- Phylum: Arthropoda
- Class: Insecta
- Order: Lepidoptera
- Superfamily: Noctuoidea
- Family: Noctuidae
- Genus: Cerapteryx
- Species: C. graminis

Binomial name
- Cerapteryx graminis (Linnaeus, 1758)

Synonyms
- Charaeas graminis Linnaeus, 1758; Heliophobus graminis Linnaeus, 1758; Phalaena graminis Linnaeus, 1758

= Cerapteryx graminis =

Antler moth

Species of moth

Cerapteryx graminis, the antler moth, is a moth of the family Noctuidae. It is a common species throughout most of Europe but is lacking in the very dry southern regions. The northernmost occurrence is Iceland, and above the Arctic Circle. It also occurs in Siberia and in North Mongolia. The species has been introduced to North America. In the Alps it rises to an altitude of 2100 meters.

== Description ==
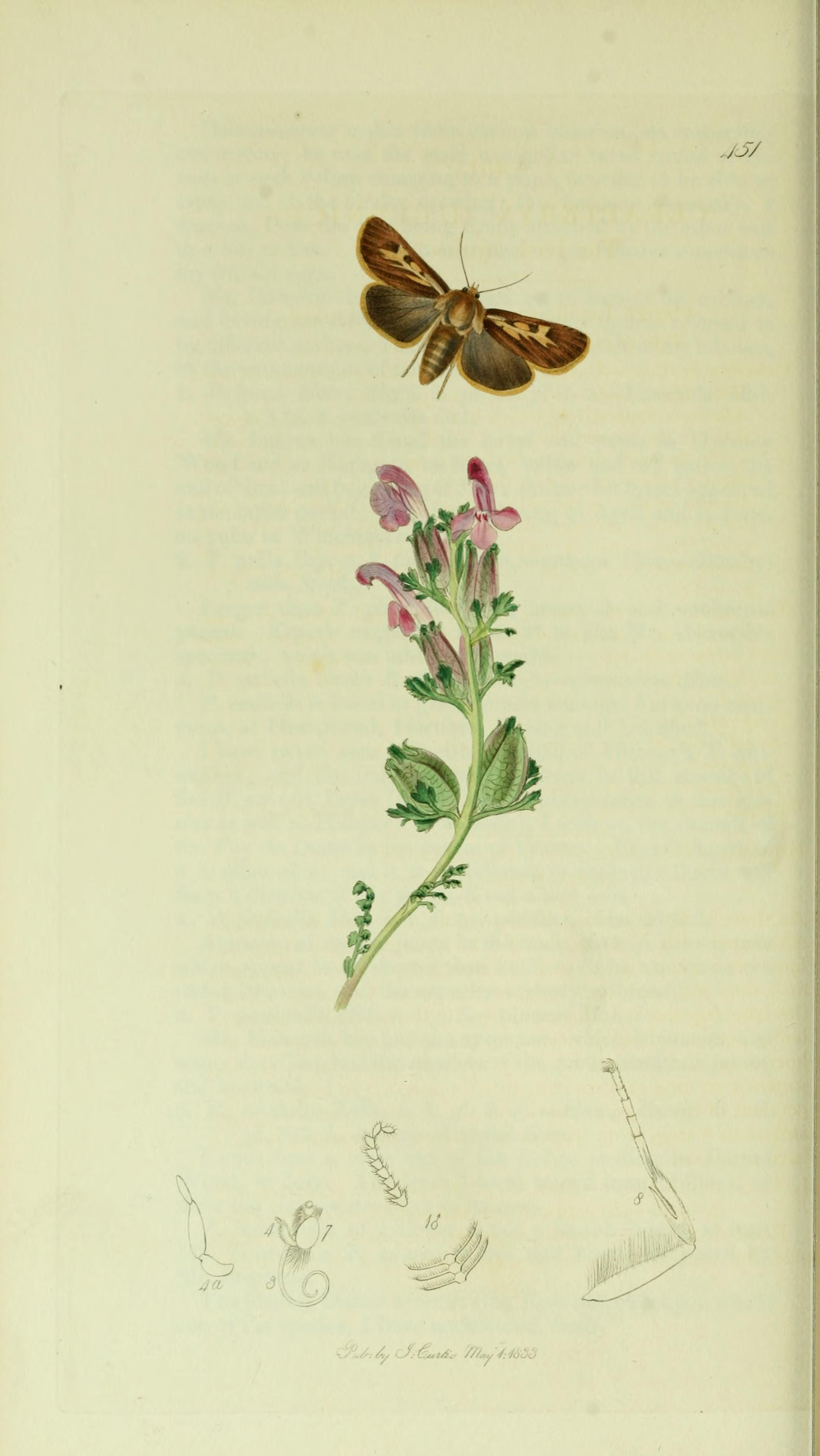
Illustration from John Curtis's British Entomology Volume 5

This species is unusual for a noctuid in that there is marked sexual dimorphism. The male has a wingspan of 27–32 mm but the female is larger with a wingspan of 35–39 mm. The forewings are brown, speckled with black and marked with a bold white branched basal streak which gives the species its common name. The hindwings are dark brown with a white fringe.

Larvae feed on a variety of grasses.

== Technical description and variation ==
Forewing olive grey or olive rufous, or olive fuscous; median and marginal areas sometimes deeper coloured, otherwise the 3 lines are undefined; stigmata pale, especially the reniform, which at base is white, emitting a ray basewards along the median vein, and two externally along veins 3 and 4; claviform elongate; orbicular flattened; hindwing dark fuscous grey, with the basal area pale, sometimes whitish; the fringe white; - in the form tricuspis male Esp. the reniform with its trifid lower end is more strongly developed than usual; - of this obsoleta Tutt is only an extreme form in which the other markings are obsolete; - rufocosta Tutt is a grey form with red costal streak, from the Hebrides; -in hibernicus Curt. the base of cell of forewing bears a pale, elongated, sometimes forked patch; - in albipuncta Sven the white lower end of reniform is entire, without pale ramification: - gramineus Haw. has all the veins whitish, the intervals dark olive, without any rufous mixture, the stigmata and base of cell more conspicuously pale: the submarginal line prominently pale and dentate along the veins, the teeth alternating with the dark teeth of the marginal area: this is the commoner form in the North of Britain, of which the form pallida Tutt is evidently an extreme development, the pale claviform, median vein, and two upper stigmata coalescing to form a broad white band from base; - grisea Spul. from N. Germany is a grey form with the median area well-defined, and may be only an offshoot of graminis [gramineis in text], which is not much known on the continent.

This moth often flies during the day, especially in warm weather, and is attracted to a range of flowers. It also flies at night and is attracted to light. The adults are on the wing from July to September.

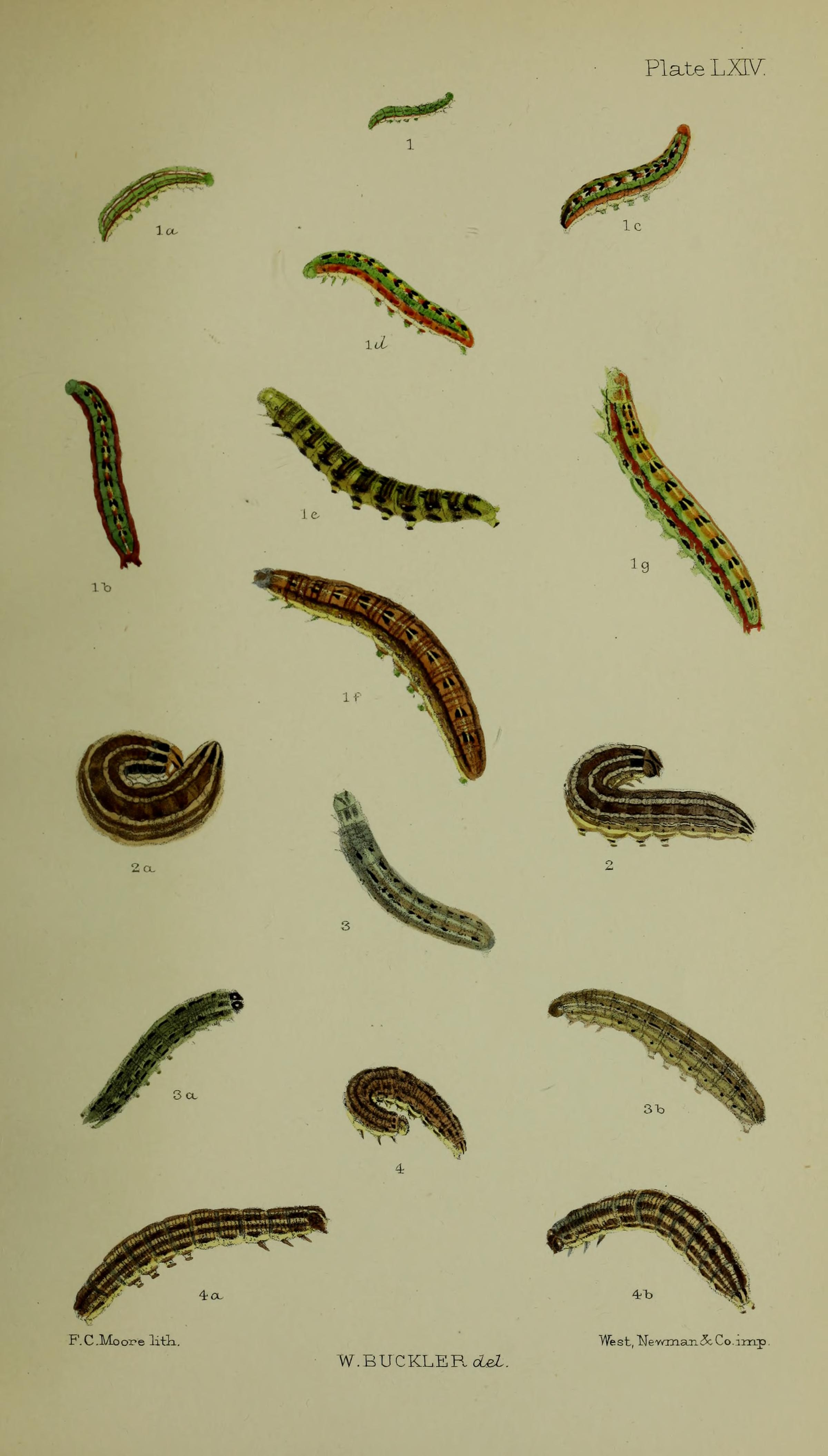
Figs 4, 4a, 4b larva after last moult

== Life cycle ==
Young larvae are greenish and change their colour with age to grey-brown to brown. They then appear clumsy and have a roller shape. They also show pale lines as well as black spiracles. The underside and legs are light brown. The head is shiny brownish. The feed on various grasses including Deschampsia, Festuca and Nardus. It is sometimes so common that it damages pastures. The species overwinters as an egg.

== Gallery ==
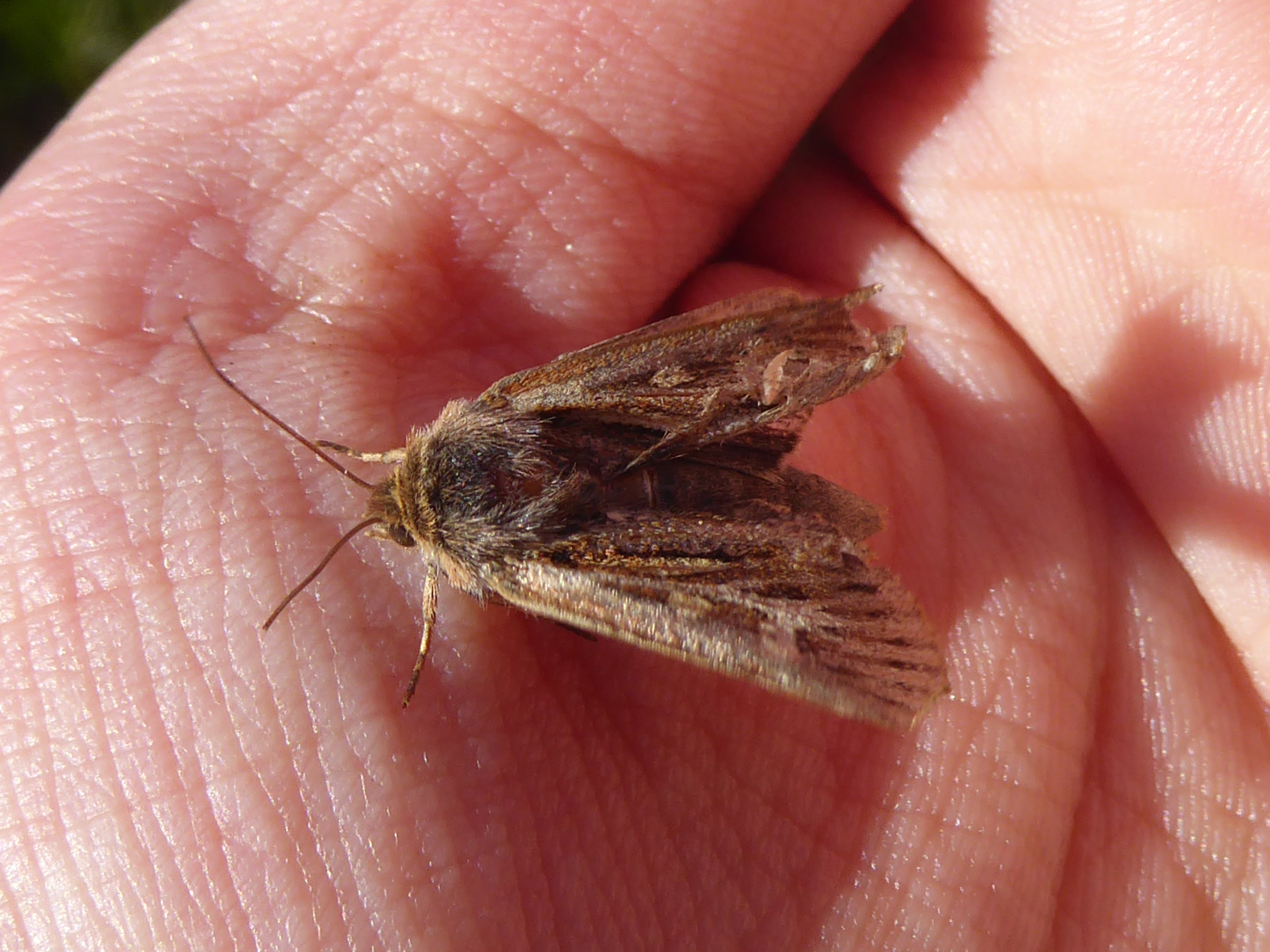

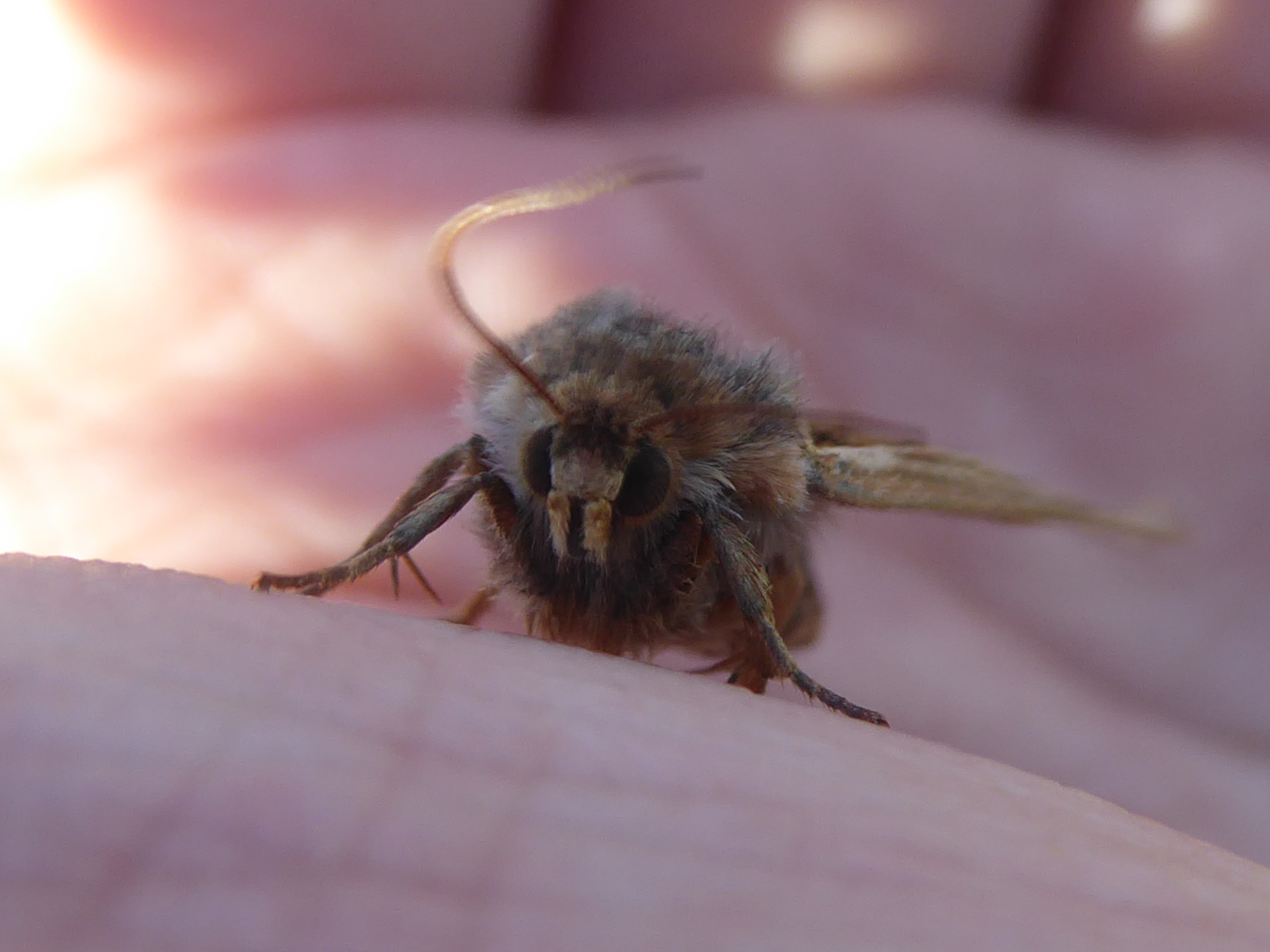

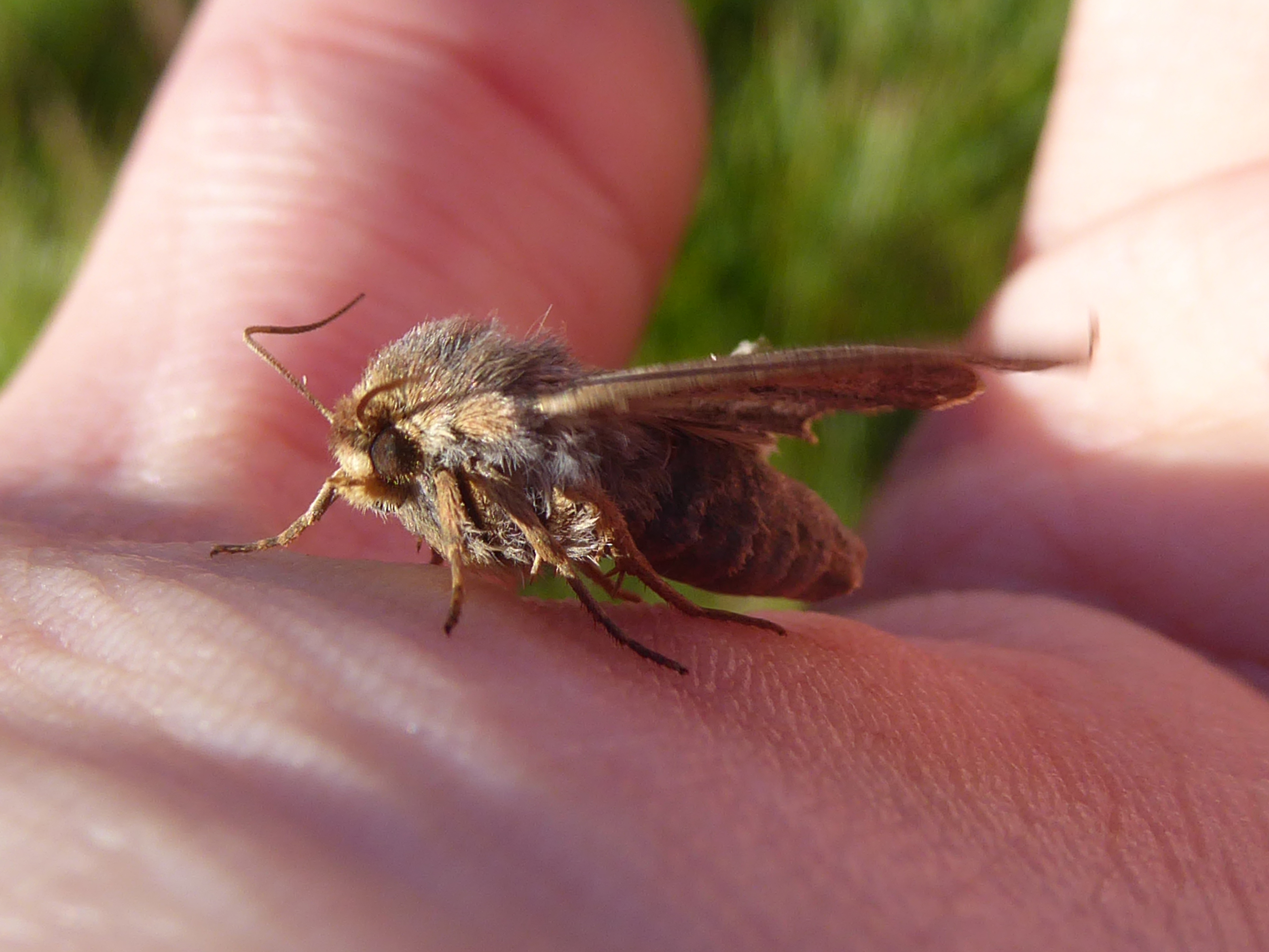

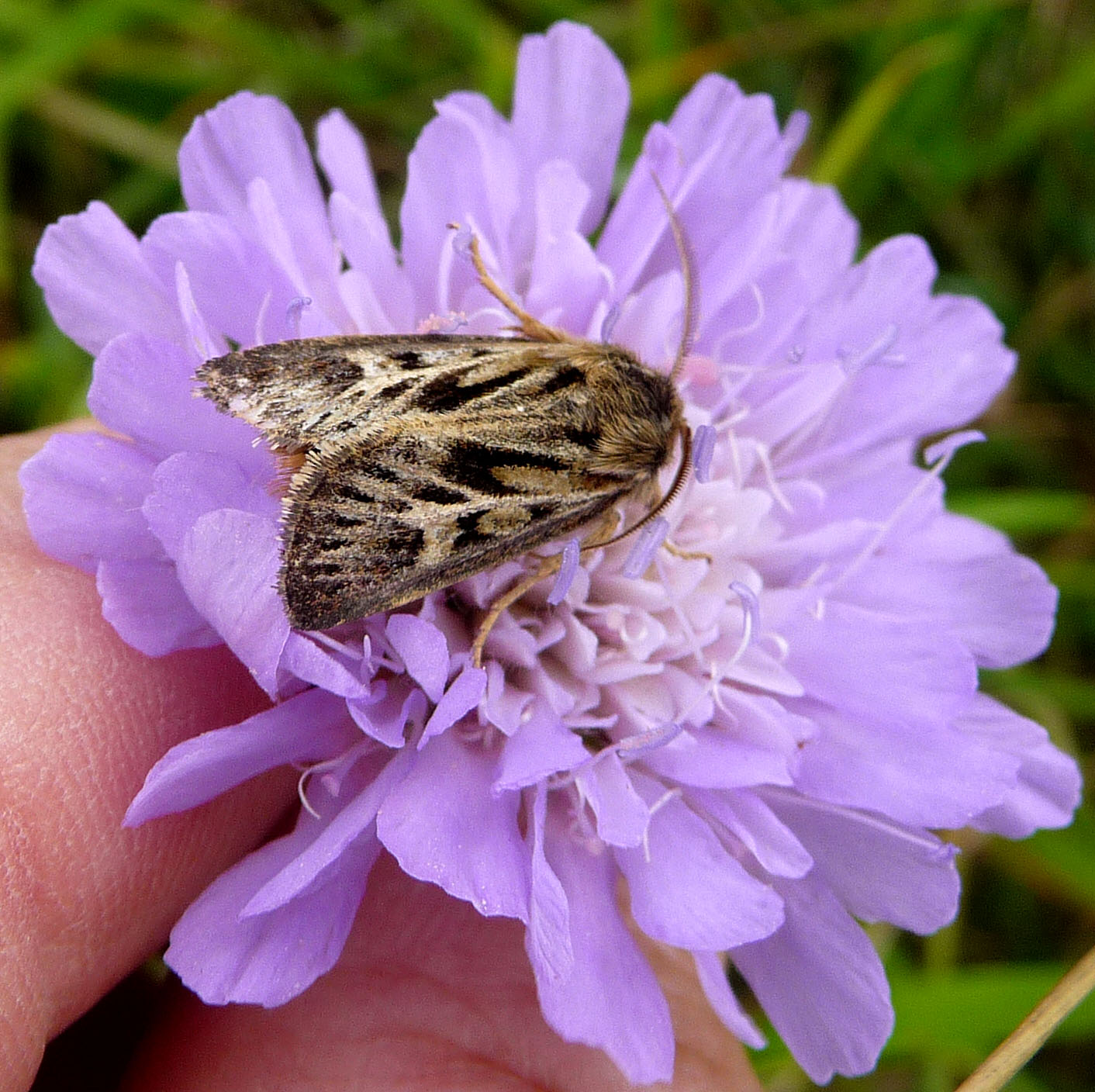

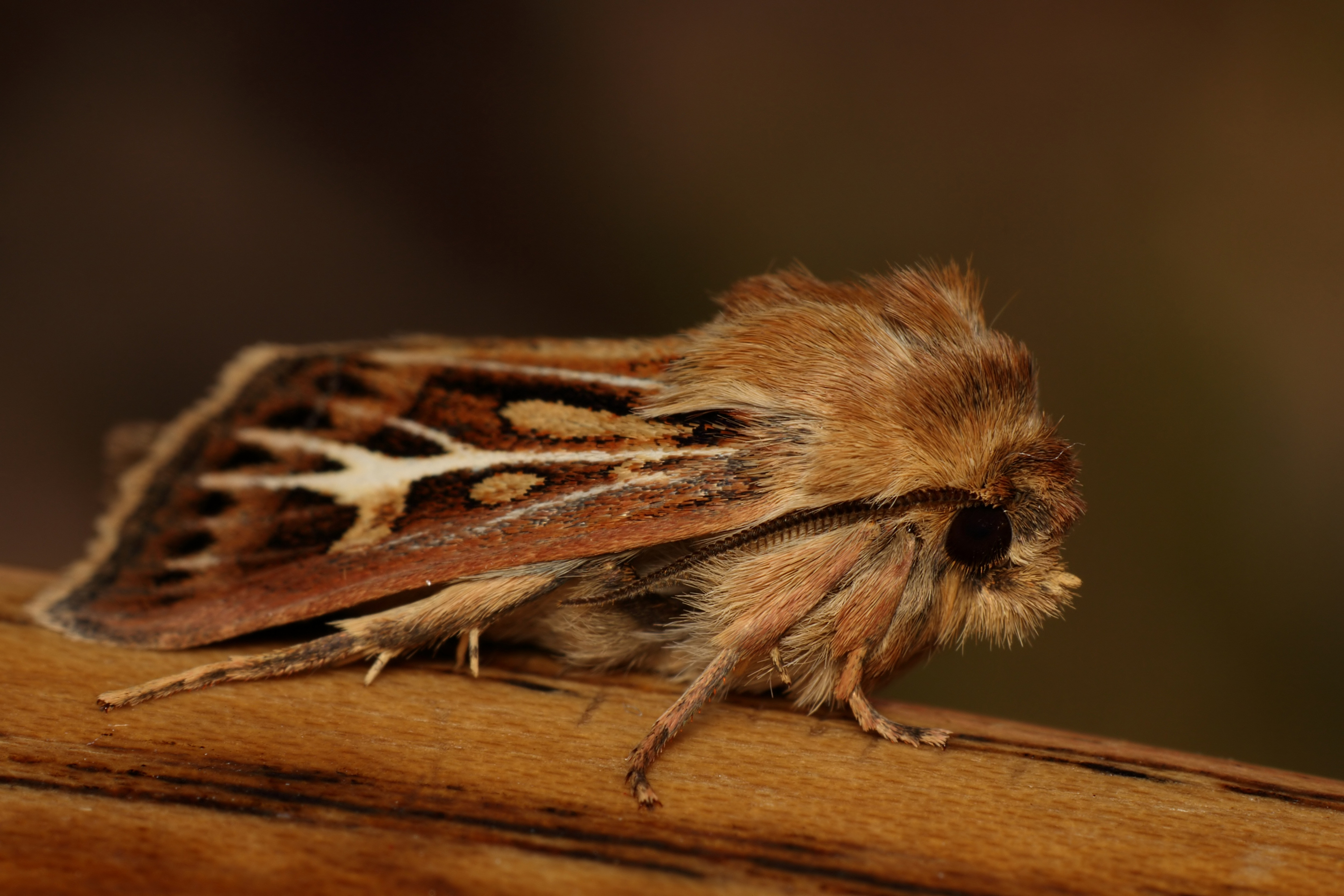

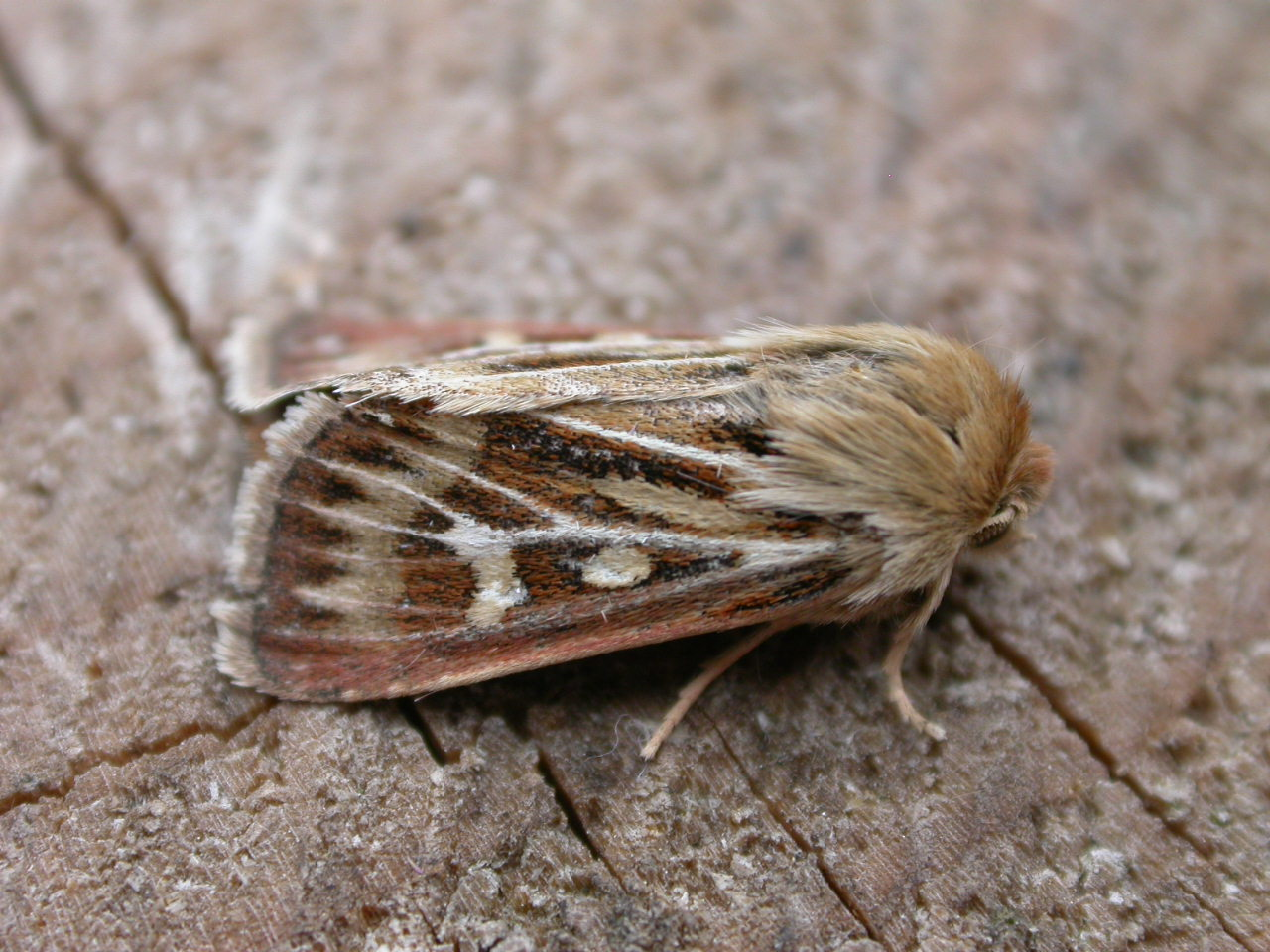

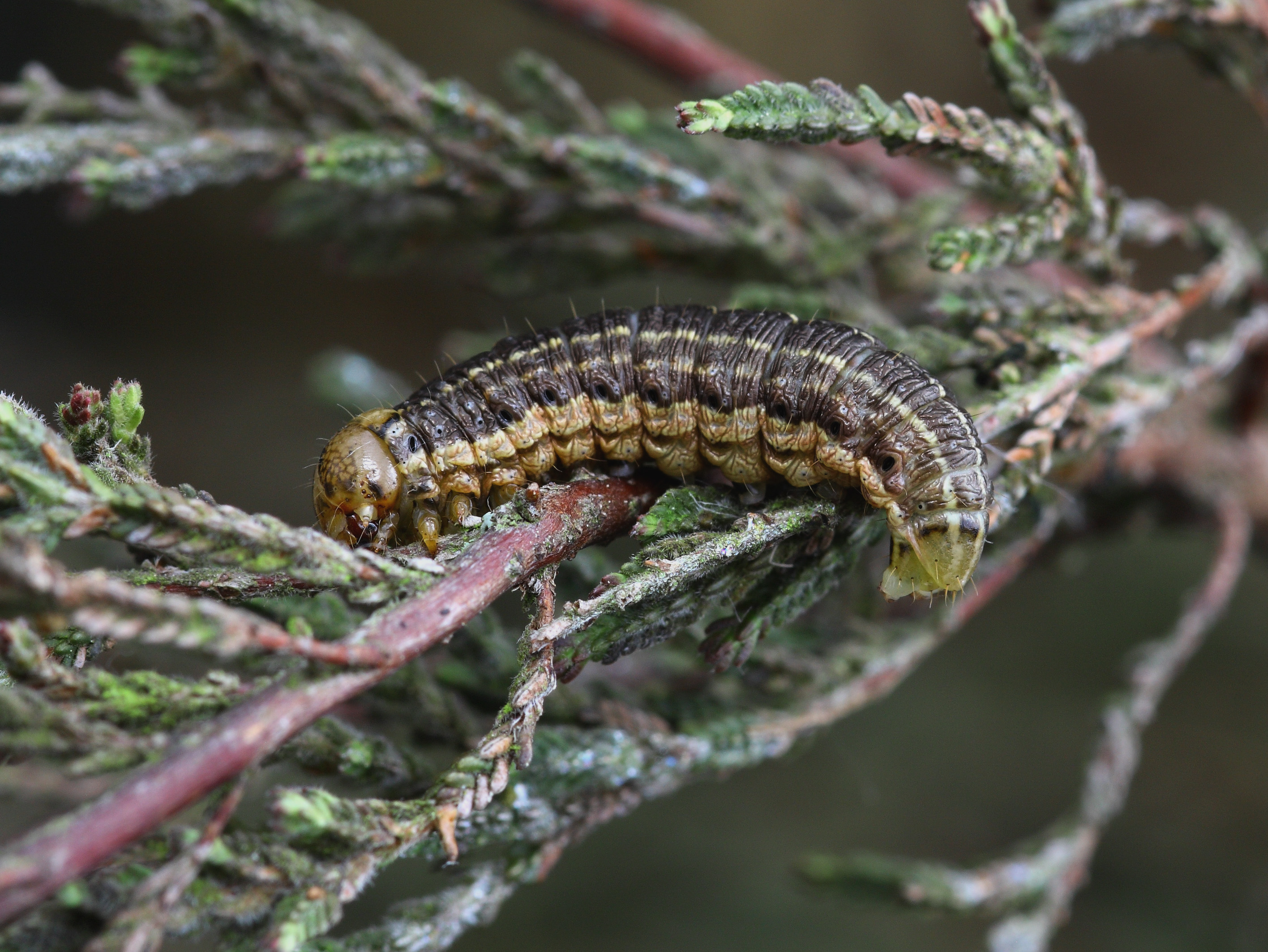

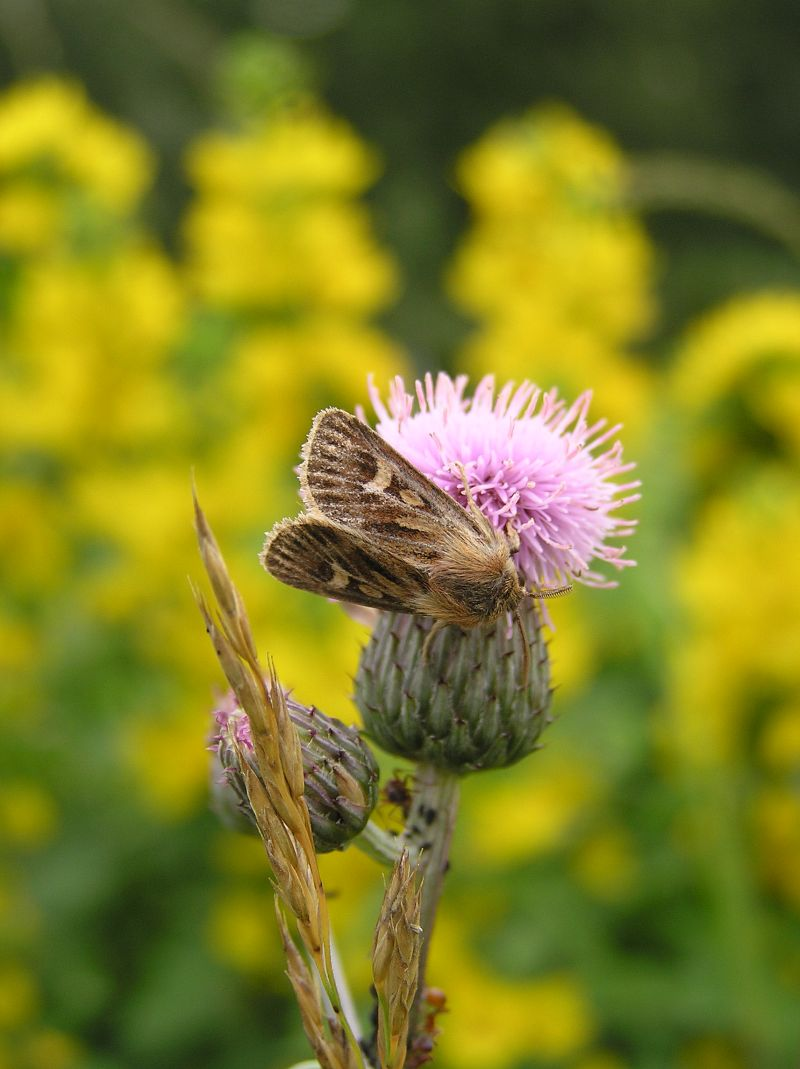

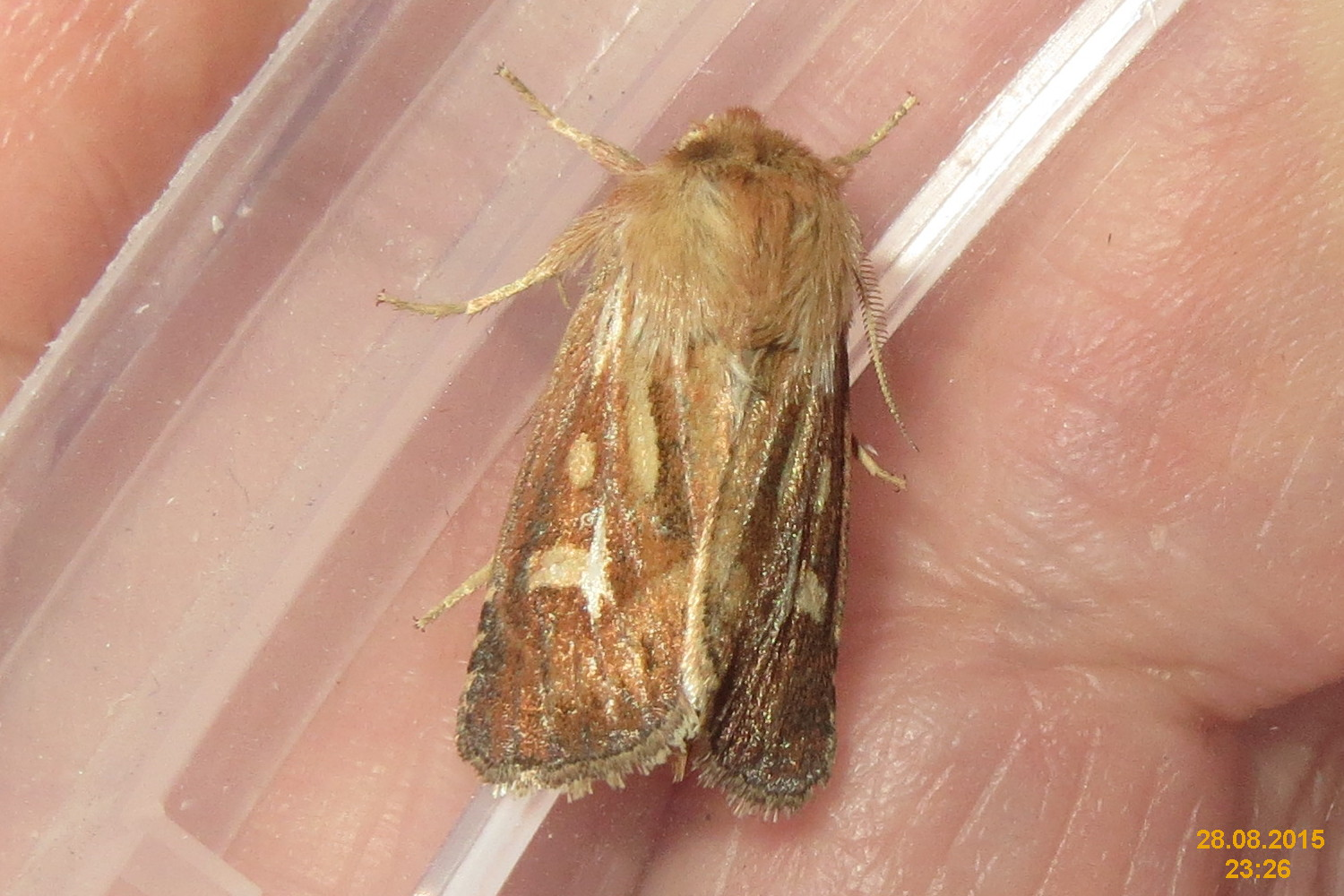

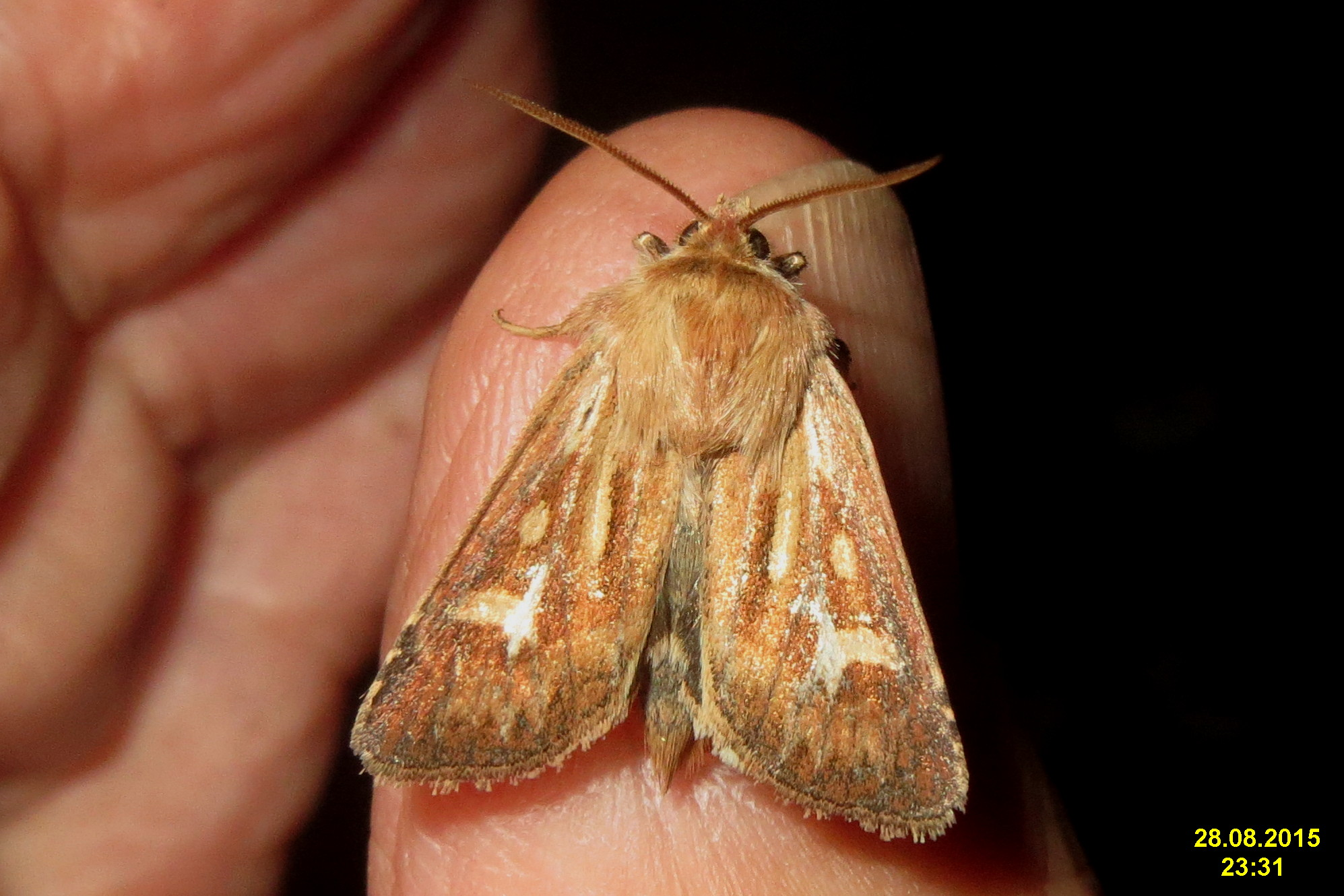
