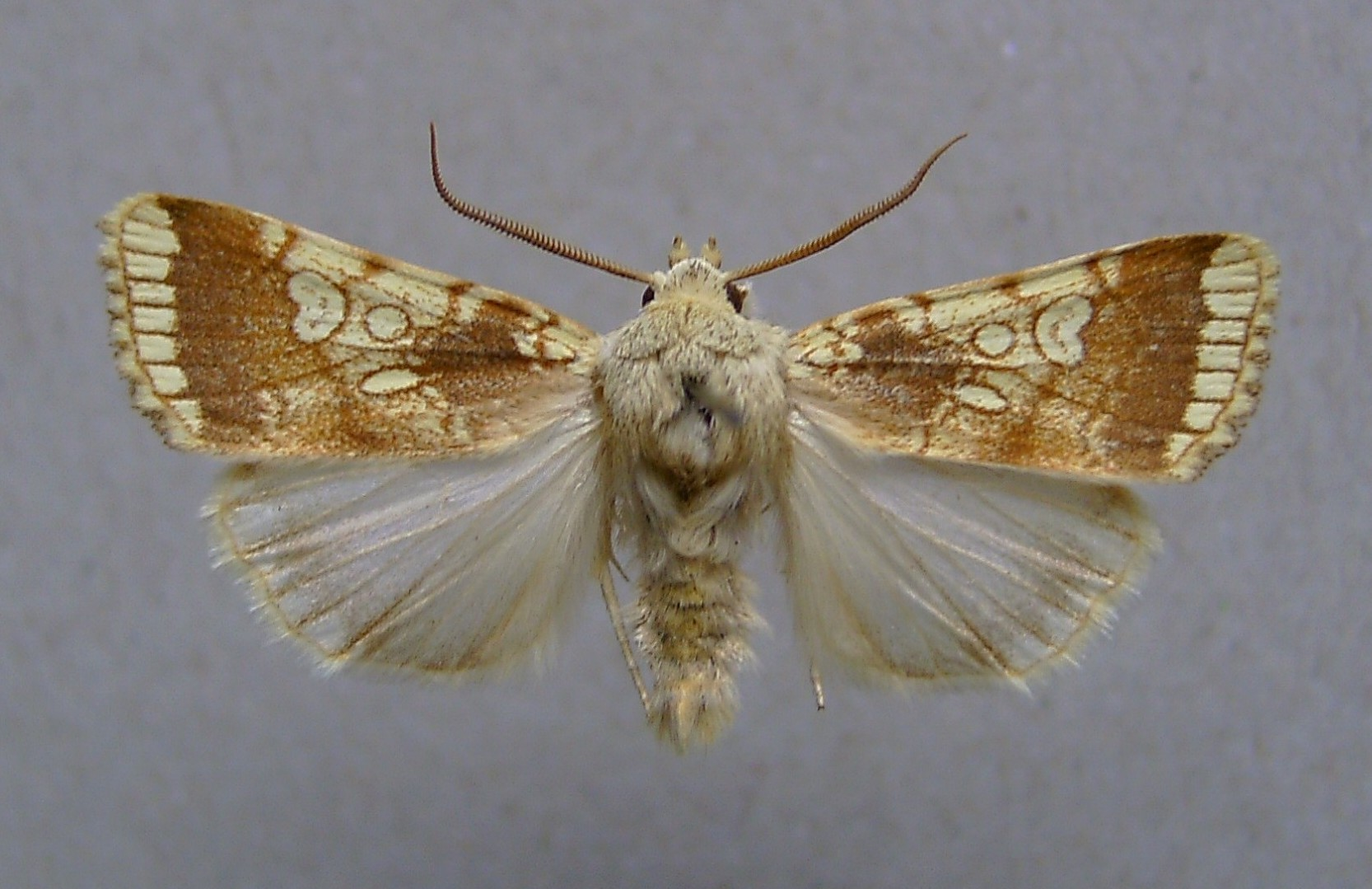
- Dicycla oo

Scientific classification
- Kingdom: Animalia
- Phylum: Arthropoda
- Class: Insecta
- Order: Lepidoptera
- Superfamily: Noctuoidea
- Family: Noctuidae
- Genus: Dicycla; Guenée, 1852

= Dicycla =

Genus of moths

Dicycla is a genus of moths of the family Noctuidae.

== Species ==
- Dicycla oo (Linnaeus, 1758)
