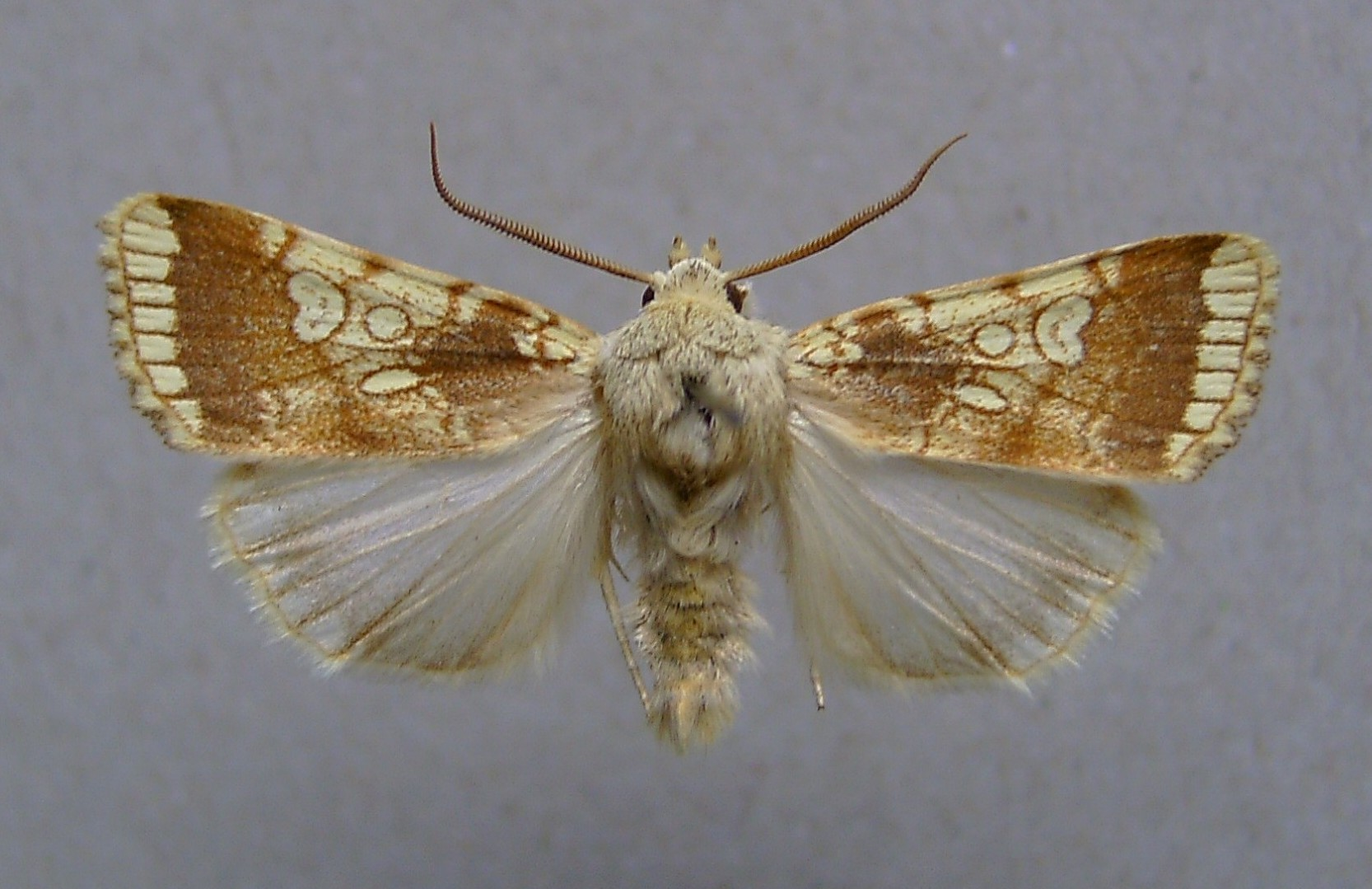
- Male

Scientific classification
- Kingdom: Animalia
- Phylum: Arthropoda
- Class: Insecta
- Order: Lepidoptera
- Superfamily: Noctuoidea
- Family: Noctuidae
- Genus: Dicycla
- Species: D. oo

Binomial name
- Dicycla oo (Linnaeus, 1758)

Synonyms
- Phalaena oo Linnaeus, 1758; Phalaena Bombyx oo Linnaeus, 1758; Noctua ferruginago Hübner, [1803]; Noctua renago Haworth, 1809

= Dicycla oo =

Heart moth

Species of moth

Dicycla oo, the heart moth, is a species of moth of the family Noctuidae. It is found locally in Europe. It is also present in Turkey, Transcaucasia, the Caucasus, Israel, Iran and Iraq.

== Technical description and variation ==
D. oo L. (47 k). Forewing pale yellow, slightly dusted with ferruginous; veins and lines and outlines of stigmata ferruginous: fringe mottled with the same colour; hindwing yellowish white, washed with grey and darker before termen; in the form ferruginago Hbn. the base and the space between outer and submarginal lines are dark: in the ab. renago Haw. (47 k) there is a ferruginous fascia before inner line and between median shade and submarginal line, united along inner margin; sulphurea Stgr. is wholly sulphur yellow: the ferruginous scales are sometimes replaced by grey = ab. griseago Schultz. Larva black-brown, clotted with white; lines white; the dorsal irregularly blotched: the subdorsal slender; the spiracular broad. The wingspan is 32–39 mm.

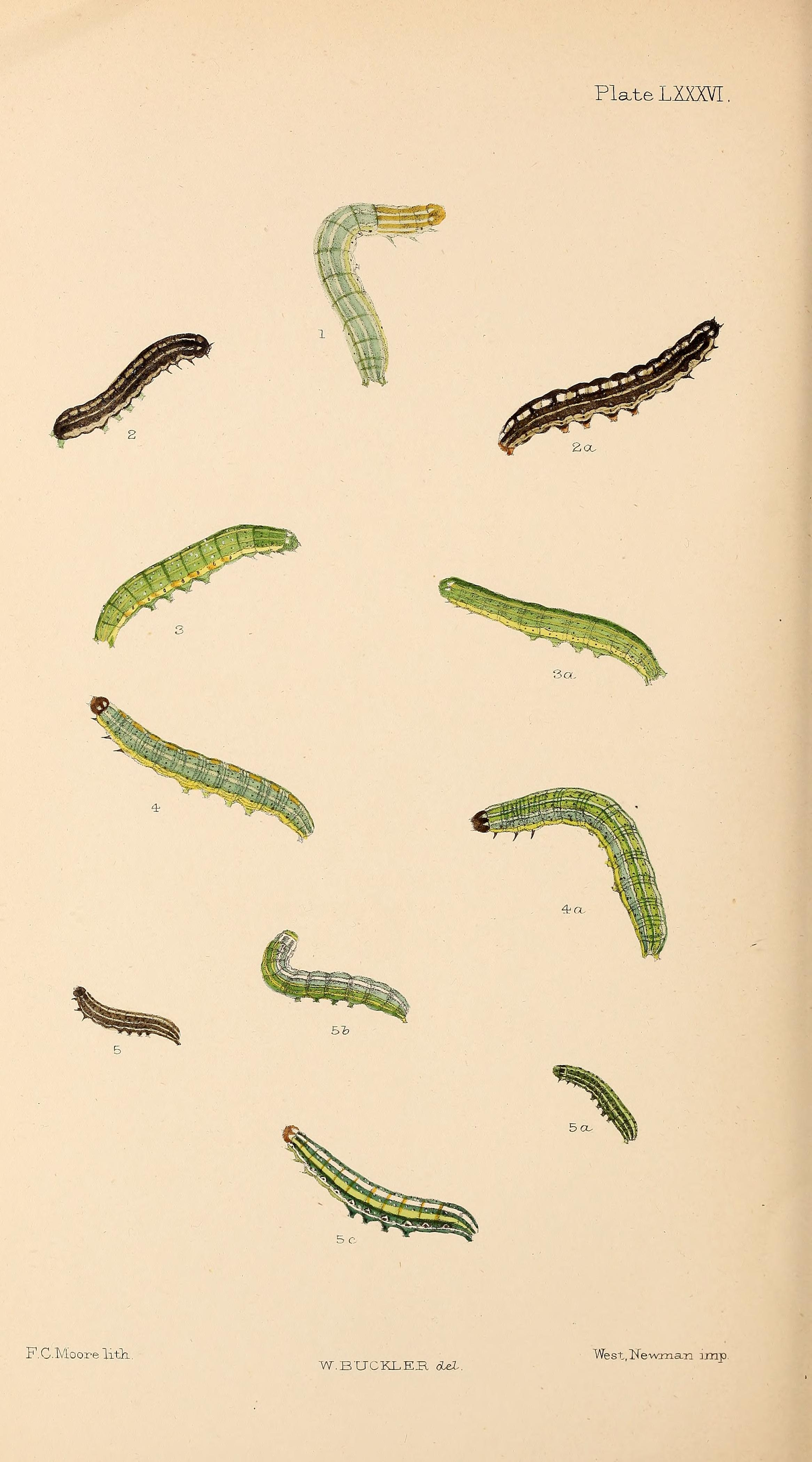
Figs 2, 2a larvae

== Biology ==
Adults are on wing from June to August.

The larvae feed on united leaves of Quercus species. Larvae can be found from May to June. The species overwinters as an egg.
