= Chasminodes bremeri =

Scientific classification
- Kingdom: Animalia
- Phylum: Arthropoda
- Class: Insecta
- Order: Lepidoptera
- Superfamily: Noctuoidea
- Family: Noctuidae
- Genus: Chasminodes
- Species: C. bremeri

Binomial name
- Chasminodes bremeri Sugi & Kononenko, 1981

Species of moth

Chasminodes bremeri is a species of moth in the family Noctuidae. It was first described in 1981 by Shigero Sugi and Vladimir Stepanovich Kononenko.

It is found on the Korean Peninsula, and in Japan.
