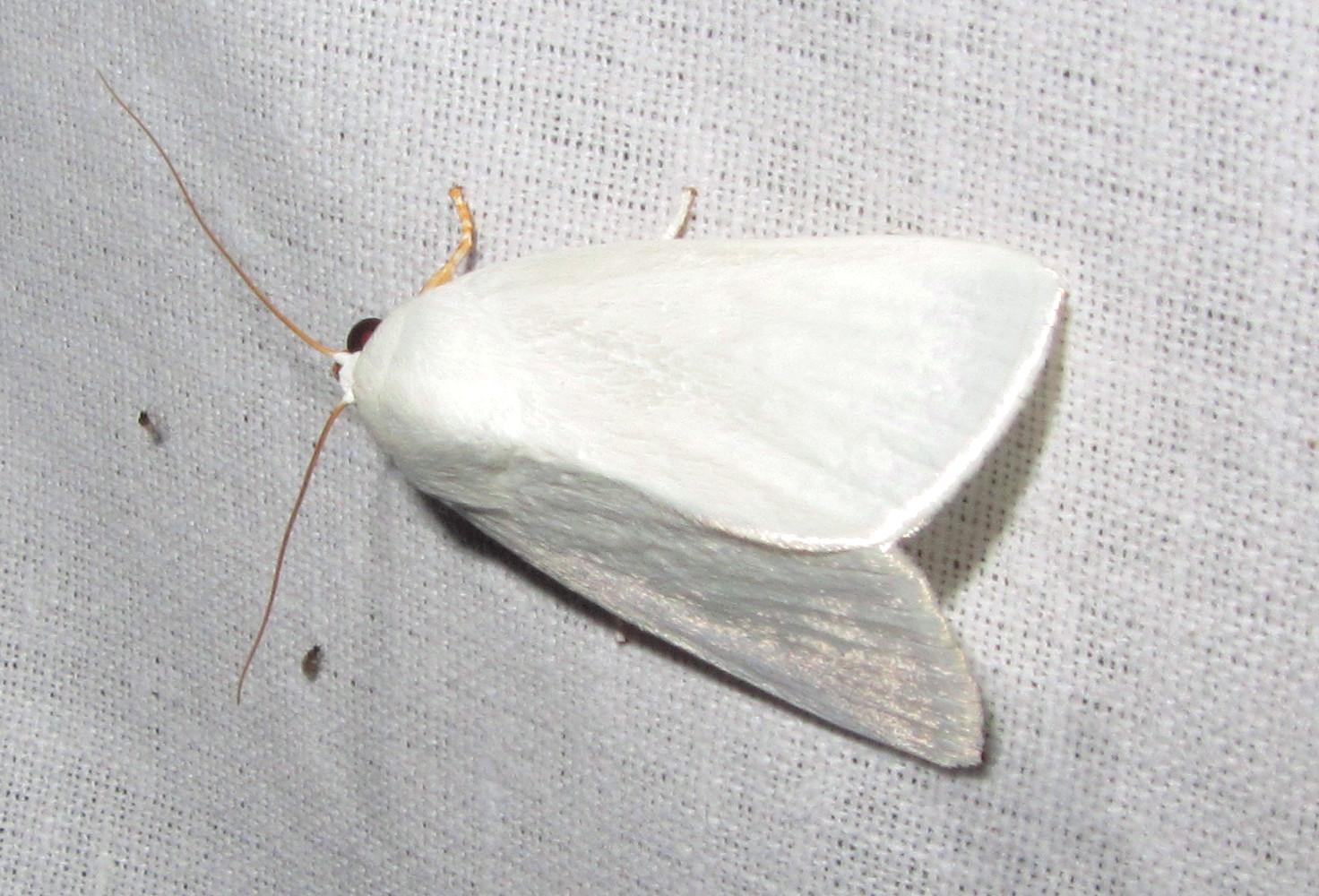

Scientific classification
- Kingdom: Animalia
- Phylum: Arthropoda
- Class: Insecta
- Order: Lepidoptera
- Superfamily: Noctuoidea
- Family: Noctuidae
- Subfamily: Xyleninae
- Genus: Chasminodes; Hampson, 1910

Type species
- Chasminodes albonitens

= Chasminodes =

Genus of moths

Chasminodes is a genus of moths of the family Noctuidae, first described by George F. Hampson in 1910. The type species is Chasminodes albitonens.

== Species ==
- Chasminodes aino Sugi, 1956
- Chasminodes albonitens Bremer
- Chasminodes annamica
- Chasminodes atrata Butler
- Chasminodes behouneki Kononenko, 2009
- Chasminodes bremeri
- Chasminodes cilia Staudinger
- Chasminodes japonica
- Chasminodes nervosa Butler
- Chasminodes nigrifascia
- Chasminodes nigrilinea Leech
- Chasminodes nigrostigma
- Chasminodes niveus
- Chasminodes pseudalbonitens Sugi
- Chasminodes sugii Koronenko
- Chasminodes unipuncta Sugi
- Chasminodes ussurica
