= List of noctuid genera: T =

The huge moth family Noctuidae contains the following genera:

A B C D E F G H I J K L M N O P Q R S T U V W X Y Z

- Tabomeeres
- Tachosa
- Tadaxa
- Taenerema
- Taeniopyga
- Taeniosea
- Tafalla
- Taivaleria
- Talapa
- Talapoptera
- Talariga
- Talmela
- Tamba
- Tamila
- Tamseale
- Tamseuxoa
- Tamsia
- Tamsola
- Tandilia
- Tanocryx
- Tantura
- Taphonia
- Tarache
- Tarachephia
- Tarachidia
- Taraconica
- Taramina
- Targalla
- Targallodes
- Tarista
- Tarsicopia
- Taseopteryx
- Tathodelta
- Tathorhynchus
- Tatorinia
- Tautobriga
- Taveta
- Tavia
- Tavila
- Taviodes
- Technemon
- Tectorea
- Tegarpagon
- Tegiapa
- Tegteza
- Teinoletis
- Teinoptera
- Telmia
- Telorta
- Temnoptera
- Tendarba
- Tephrialia
- Tephrias
- Tephrinops
- Tephriopis
- Tephrochares
- Teratocera
- Teratoglaea
- Tesagrotis
- Tesomonoda
- Tetanolita
- Tetracme
- Tetrapyra
- Tetrapyrgia
- Tetrargentia
- Tetrastictypena
- Tetrisia
- Teucocranon
- Thalatha
- Thalathoides
- Thalatta
- Thalerastria
- Thalomicra
- Thalpophila
- Thargelia
- Thaumasiodes
- Thausgea
- Thecamichtis
- Thegalea
- Thelidora
- Thelxinoa
- Themma
- Theotinus
- Therasea
- Thermesia
- Thermosara
- Thiachroia
- Thiacidas
- Thiochroa
- Thiona
- Thioptera
- Tholera
- Tholeropsis
- Tholocoleus
- Tholomiges
- Thopelia
- Thoracolopha
- Thoracolophotos
- Thria
- Throana
- Thurberiphaga
- Thurnerichola
- Thursania
- Thyas
- Thyatirina
- Thyatirodes
- Thyreion
- Thyrestra
- Thyria
- Thyridospila
- Thyriodes
- Thyrostipa
- Thysania
- Thysanoplusia
- Tibiocillaria
- Tibracana
- Tigrana
- Tigreana
- Tiliacea
- Timora
- Tineocephala
- Tinnodoa
- Tinolius
- Tipasa
- Tipasodes
- Tipra
- Tiracola
- Tiridata
- Tiruvaca
- Tisagronia
- Tmetolophota
- Toana
- Toanodes
- Toanopsis
- Tochara
- Tolnaodes
- Toanopsis
- Tolnosphingia
- Tolpia
- Tolpiodes
- Tornacontia
- Tornosinus
- Tosacantha
- Toxocampa
- Toxonprucha
- Toxophleps
- Trachea
- Tracheoides
- Tracheplexia
- Trachodopalpus
- Trachysmatis
- Tracta
- Tranoses
- Transbryoleuca
- Transeuplexia
- Translatix
- Transsimyra
- Trapezoptera
- Trauaxa
- Treitschkendia
- Triaena
- Trichagrotis
- Trichanarta
- Trichanua
- Trichestra
- Tricheurois
- Trichobathra
- Trichoblemma
- Trichocerapoda
- Trichoclea
- Trichocosmia
- Trichofeltia
- Trichogatha
- Tricholita
- Tricholonche
- Trichopalpina
- Trichophotia
- Trichoplexia
- Trichoplusia
- Trichopolia
- Trichopolydesma
- Trichoptya
- Trichordestra
- Trichorhiza
- Trichoridia
- Trichorthosia
- Trichosellus
- Trichosilia
- Trichospolas
- Trichotarache
- Trichypena
- Tricopis
- Tricraterifrontia
- Tridentifrons
- Tridepia
- Trigeminostola
- Trigonephra
- Trigonistis
- Trigonochrostia
- Trigonodes
- Trigonodesma
- Trigonophora
- Trilophia
- Trilophonota
- Tringilburra
- Triocnemis
- Triommatodes
- Triphaenopsis
- Tripseuxoa
- Tripudia
- Trisateles
- Trispila
- Trissernis
- Trissophaes
- Tristyla
- Trisula
- Trisulana
- Trisulopsis
- Tritomoceras
- Troctoptera
- Trogacontia
- Trogatha
- Trogoblemma
- Trogocraspis
- Trogogonia
- Trogotorna
- Tropidtamba
- Trothisa
- Trotosema
- Trudestra
- Trumuspis
- Tschetwerikovia
- Tuerta
- Tuertella
- Tumidifrontia
- Tunocaria
- Tunza
- Turacina
- Turanica
- Turbula
- Tycomarptes
- Tycracona
- Tympanobasis
- Tyrissa
- Tyta
- Tytroca
