= Tinoliinae =

Scientific classification
- Kingdom: Animalia
- Phylum: Arthropoda
- Clade: Pancrustacea
- Class: Insecta
- Order: Lepidoptera
- Superfamily: Noctuoidea
- Family: Erebidae
- Subfamily: Tinoliinae; Moore, [1885]

Subfamily of moths

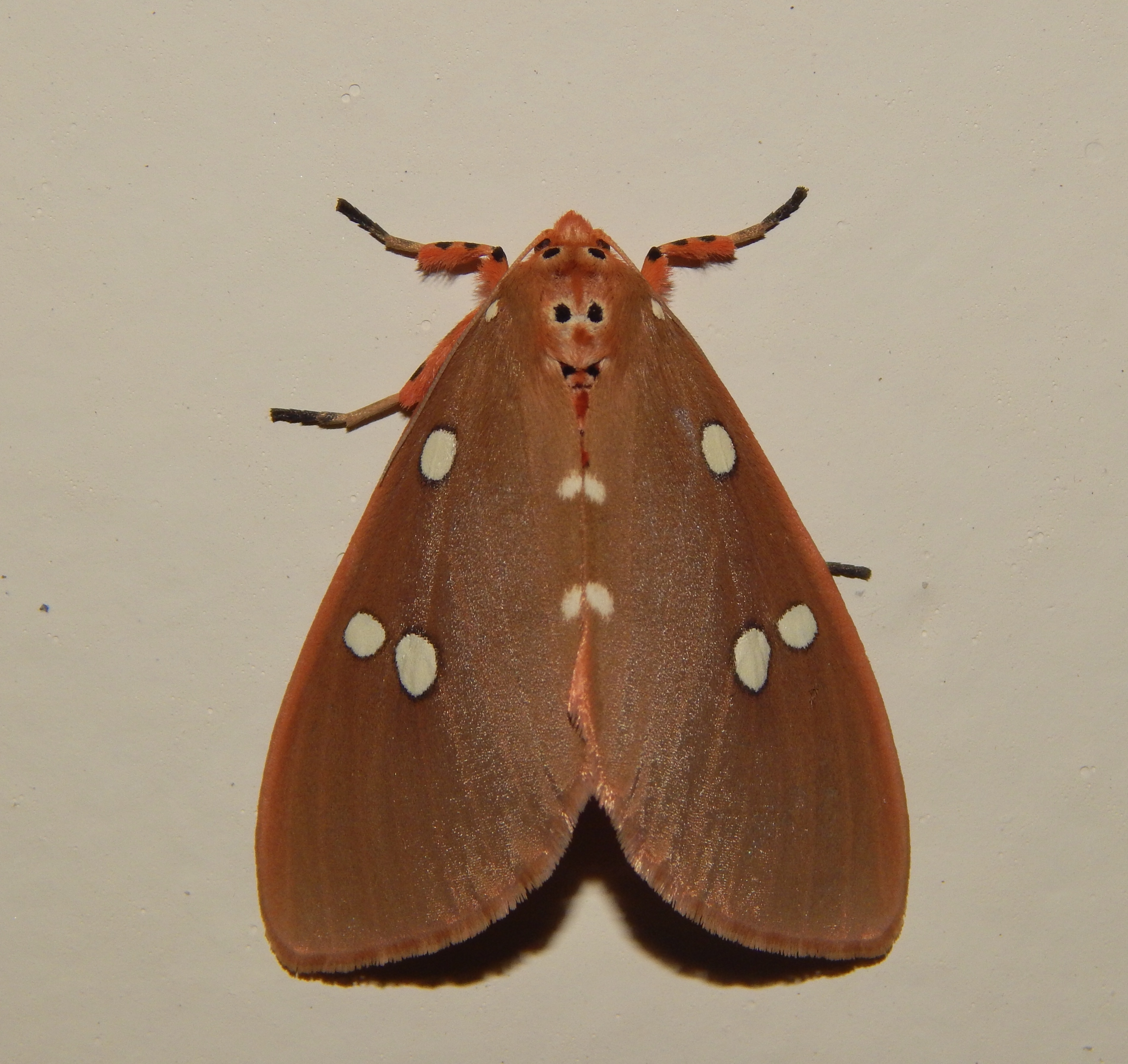
Tinolius eburneigutta, from Coorg, India

The Tinoliinae are a subfamily of moths in the family Erebidae.

== Taxonomy ==
Phylogenetic analysis only weakly supports the subfamily as a clade. The subfamily may be significantly revised after further study.

== Genera ==
- Poeta
- Tamsia
- Tinolius
