= Taveta =

Taveta may refer to:

- Taveta people of Southeast Africa
- Taveta language
- Taita-Taveta County, Kenya, formerly Taita-Taveta District
- Taveta, Kenya, a town at the border with Tanzania
- Taveta Constituency, a parliamentary constituency in Kenya
- Taveta (moth), a genus of the family Erebidae
