= Tisagronia pexa =

Scientific classification
- Kingdom: Animalia
- Phylum: Arthropoda
- Class: Insecta
- Order: Lepidoptera
- Superfamily: Noctuoidea
- Family: Noctuidae
- Genus: Tisagronia
- Species: T. pexa

Binomial name
- Tisagronia pexa (Berg, 1877)

Synonyms
- Agrotis pexa Berg, 1877

Species of moth

Tisagronia pexa is a moth of the family Noctuidae. It is found in the Maule and Magallanes and Antartica Chilena Regions of Chile and Patagonia in Argentina

The wingspan is about 42 mm. Adults are on wing in January
