= Tipasa omariusalis =

Scientific classification
- Kingdom: Animalia
- Phylum: Arthropoda
- Clade: Pancrustacea
- Class: Insecta
- Order: Lepidoptera
- Superfamily: Noctuoidea
- Family: Erebidae
- Genus: Tipasa
- Species: T. omariusalis

Binomial name
- Tipasa omariusalis Walker, 1859

Species of moth

Tipasa omariusalis is a moth of the family Erebidae.
