= Teinoptera culminifera =

Scientific classification
- Domain: Eukaryota
- Kingdom: Animalia
- Phylum: Arthropoda
- Class: Insecta
- Order: Lepidoptera
- Superfamily: Noctuoidea
- Family: Erebidae
- Genus: Teinoptera
- Species: T. culminifera

Binomial name
- Teinoptera culminifera Calberla, 1891

Synonyms
- Copiphana kraussi (Rebel, 1895); Calophasia kraussi Rebel, 1895; Copiphana craussi (Hampson, 1906); Copiphana mahuzzim (Oberthür, 1913)

Species of moth

Teinoptera culminifera is a moth of the family Noctuidae. The species was first described by H. Calberla in 1891. It is found in North Africa, the central Arabian deserts, the Sinai in Egypt, Jordan and Israel.

Adults are on wing from February to April. There is one generation per year.
