= Tripudia limbatus =

Scientific classification
- Domain: Eukaryota
- Kingdom: Animalia
- Phylum: Arthropoda
- Class: Insecta
- Order: Lepidoptera
- Superfamily: Noctuoidea
- Family: Noctuidae
- Genus: Tripudia
- Species: T. limbatus

Binomial name
- Tripudia limbatus (H. Edwards, 1881)

Species of moth

Tripudia limbatus is a species of moth in the family Noctuidae (the owlet moths).

The MONA or Hodges number for Tripudia limbatus is 9011.
