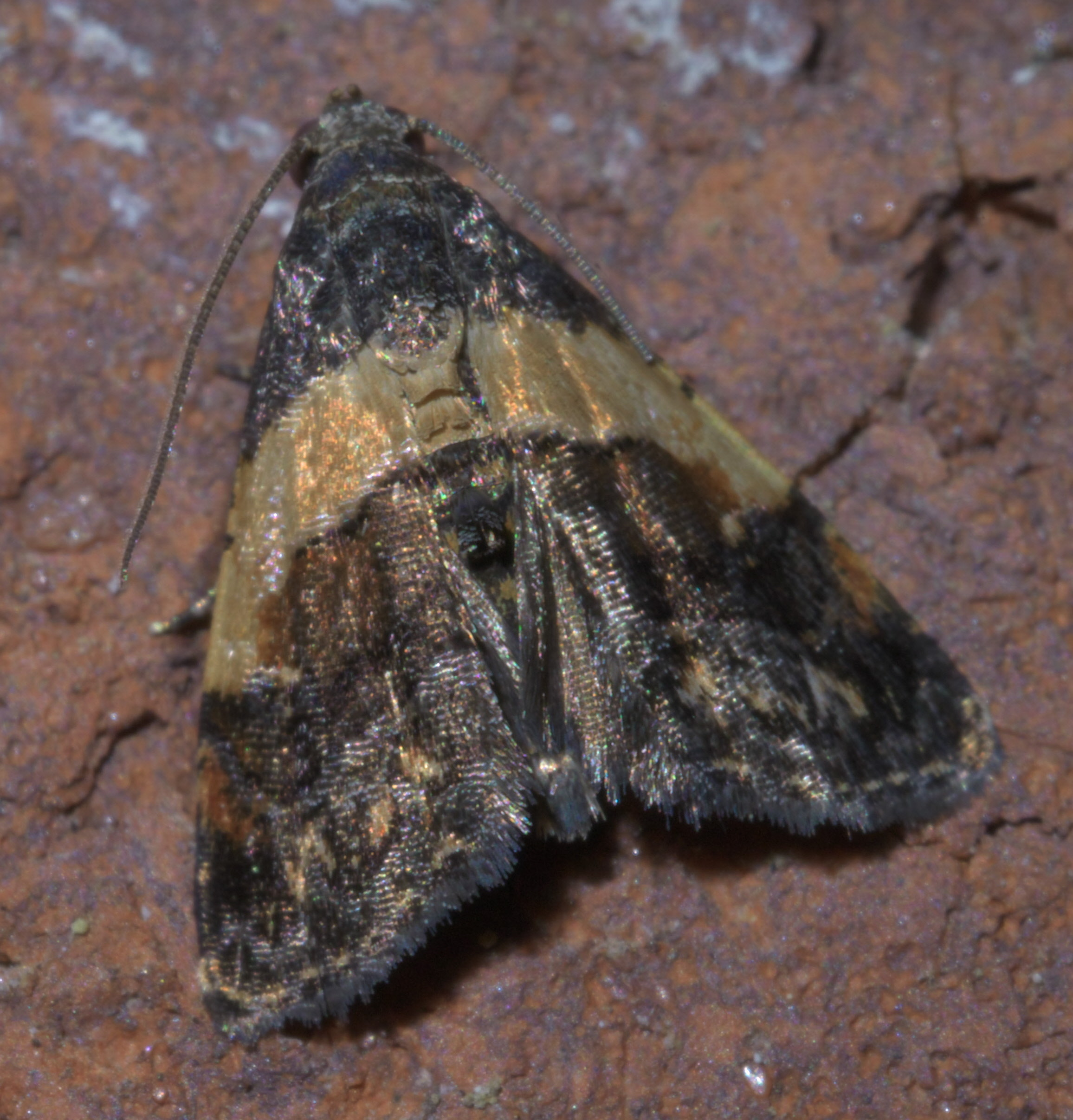

Scientific classification
- Kingdom: Animalia
- Phylum: Arthropoda
- Class: Insecta
- Order: Lepidoptera
- Superfamily: Noctuoidea
- Family: Noctuidae
- Genus: Tripudia
- Species: T. flavofasciata

Binomial name
- Tripudia flavofasciata Grote, 1877

= Tripudia flavofasciata =

Species of moth

Tripudia flavofasciata is a species of moth in the family Noctuidae (the owlet moths). It is found in North America.

The MONA or Hodges number for Tripudia flavofasciata is 9009.
