= Teinoptera oliva =

Scientific classification
- Domain: Eukaryota
- Kingdom: Animalia
- Phylum: Arthropoda
- Class: Insecta
- Order: Lepidoptera
- Superfamily: Noctuoidea
- Family: Erebidae
- Genus: Teinoptera
- Species: T. oliva

Binomial name
- Teinoptera oliva (Staudinger, 1895)

Synonyms
- Copiphana oliva (Staudinger, 1895); Cleophana oliva Staudinger, 1895

Species of moth

Teinoptera oliva is a moth of the family Noctuidae. It is found in Greece, Turkey, Syria, Armenia and Transcaucasia.

Adults are on wing from May to July.
