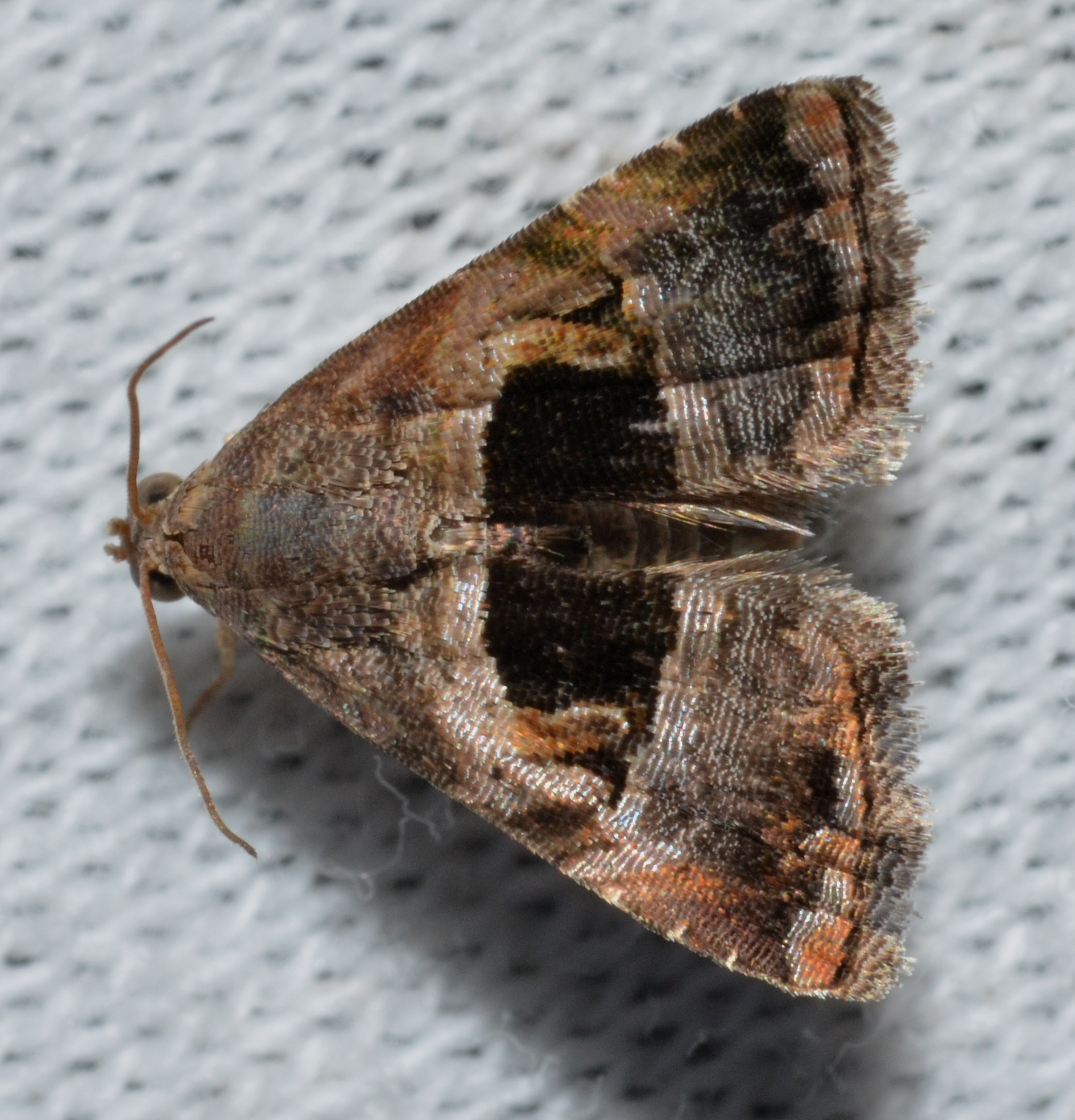

Scientific classification
- Domain: Eukaryota
- Kingdom: Animalia
- Phylum: Arthropoda
- Class: Insecta
- Order: Lepidoptera
- Superfamily: Noctuoidea
- Family: Noctuidae
- Subfamily: Cobubathinae
- Genus: Tripudia
- Species: T. rectangula

Binomial name
- Tripudia rectangula Pogue, 2009

= Tripudia rectangula =

Species of moth

Tripudia rectangula is a moth in the family Noctuidae. It is found in North America, where it has been recorded from Alabama, Florida, Georgia, Illinois, Indiana, Iowa, Louisiana, Maryland, Mississippi, North Carolina, Ohio, Oklahoma, South Carolina and Tennessee.

The wingspan is about 14 mm.

The larvae feed on Ruellia species.
