= Tripudia luda =

Scientific classification
- Domain: Eukaryota
- Kingdom: Animalia
- Phylum: Arthropoda
- Class: Insecta
- Order: Lepidoptera
- Superfamily: Noctuoidea
- Family: Noctuidae
- Genus: Tripudia
- Species: T. luda

Binomial name
- Tripudia luda (H. Druce, 1898)

Species of moth

Tripudia luda is a species of moth in the family Noctuidae (the owlet moths).

The MONA or Hodges number for Tripudia luda is 9006.
