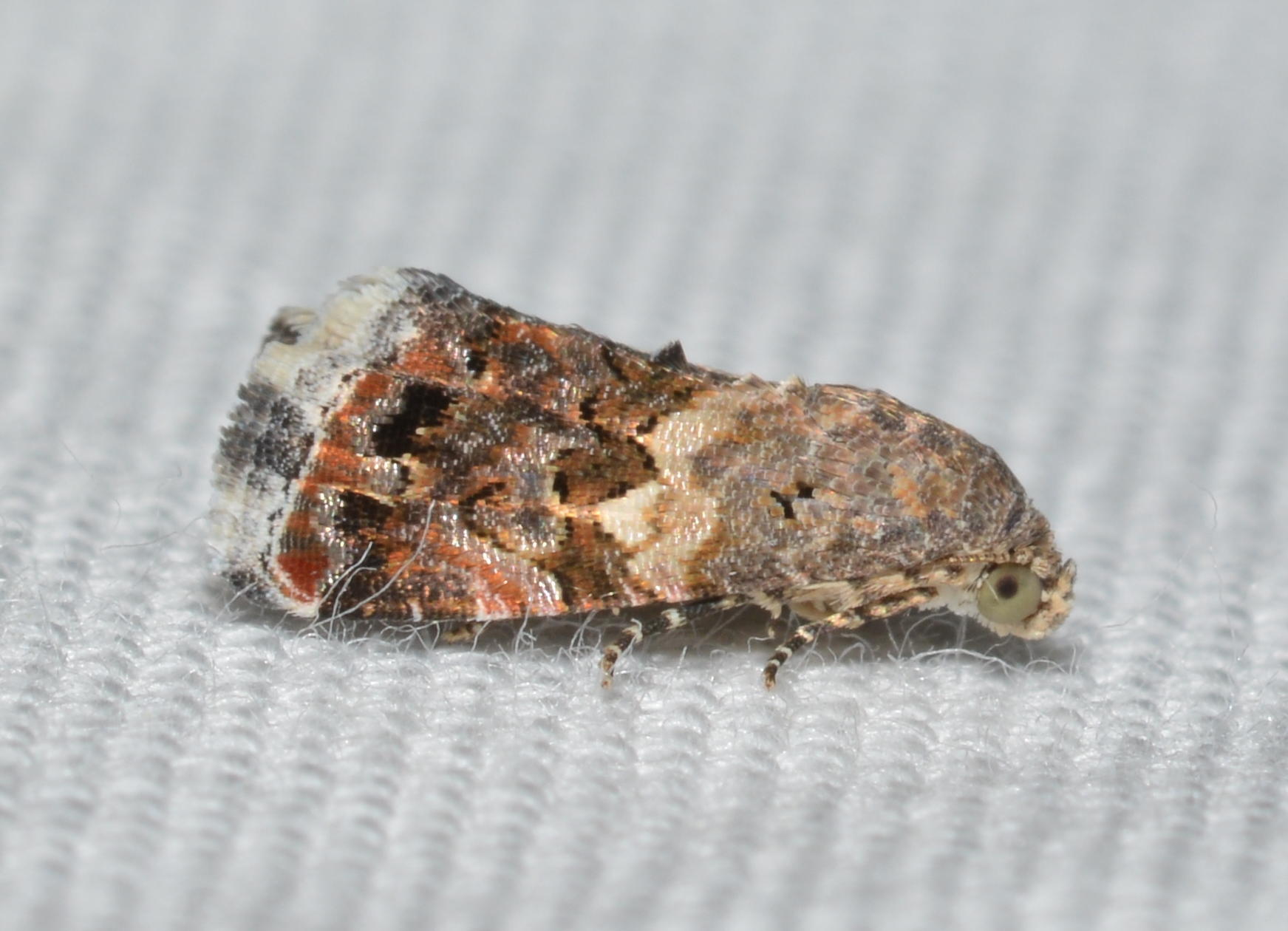

Scientific classification
- Domain: Eukaryota
- Kingdom: Animalia
- Phylum: Arthropoda
- Class: Insecta
- Order: Lepidoptera
- Superfamily: Noctuoidea
- Family: Noctuidae
- Genus: Tripudia
- Species: T. luxuriosa

Binomial name
- Tripudia luxuriosa Smith, 1900

= Tripudia luxuriosa =

Species of moth

Tripudia luxuriosa is a moth in the family Noctuidae (the owlet moths) first described by Smith in 1900. It is found in North America.

The MONA or Hodges number for Tripudia luxuriosa is 9008.

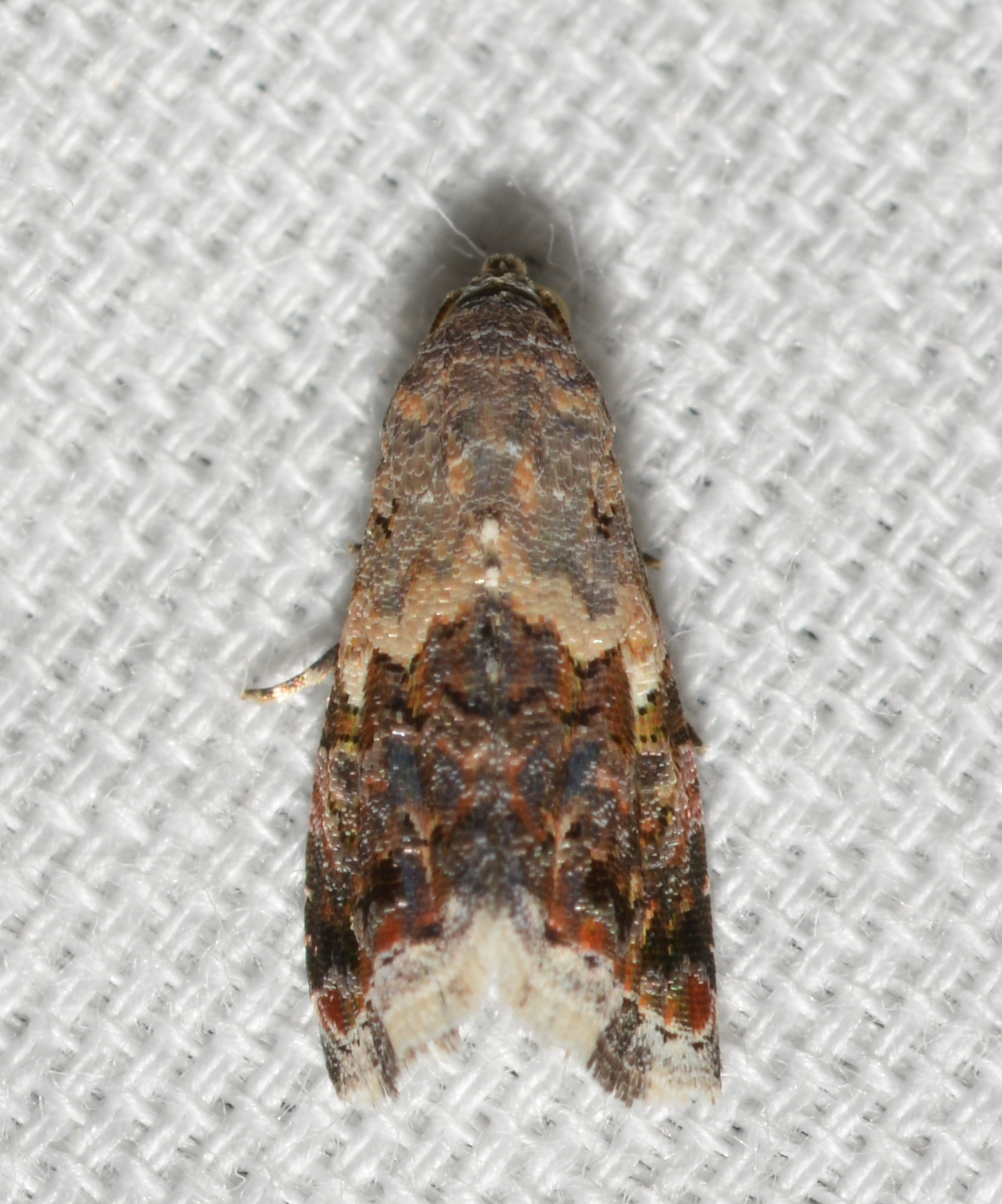
