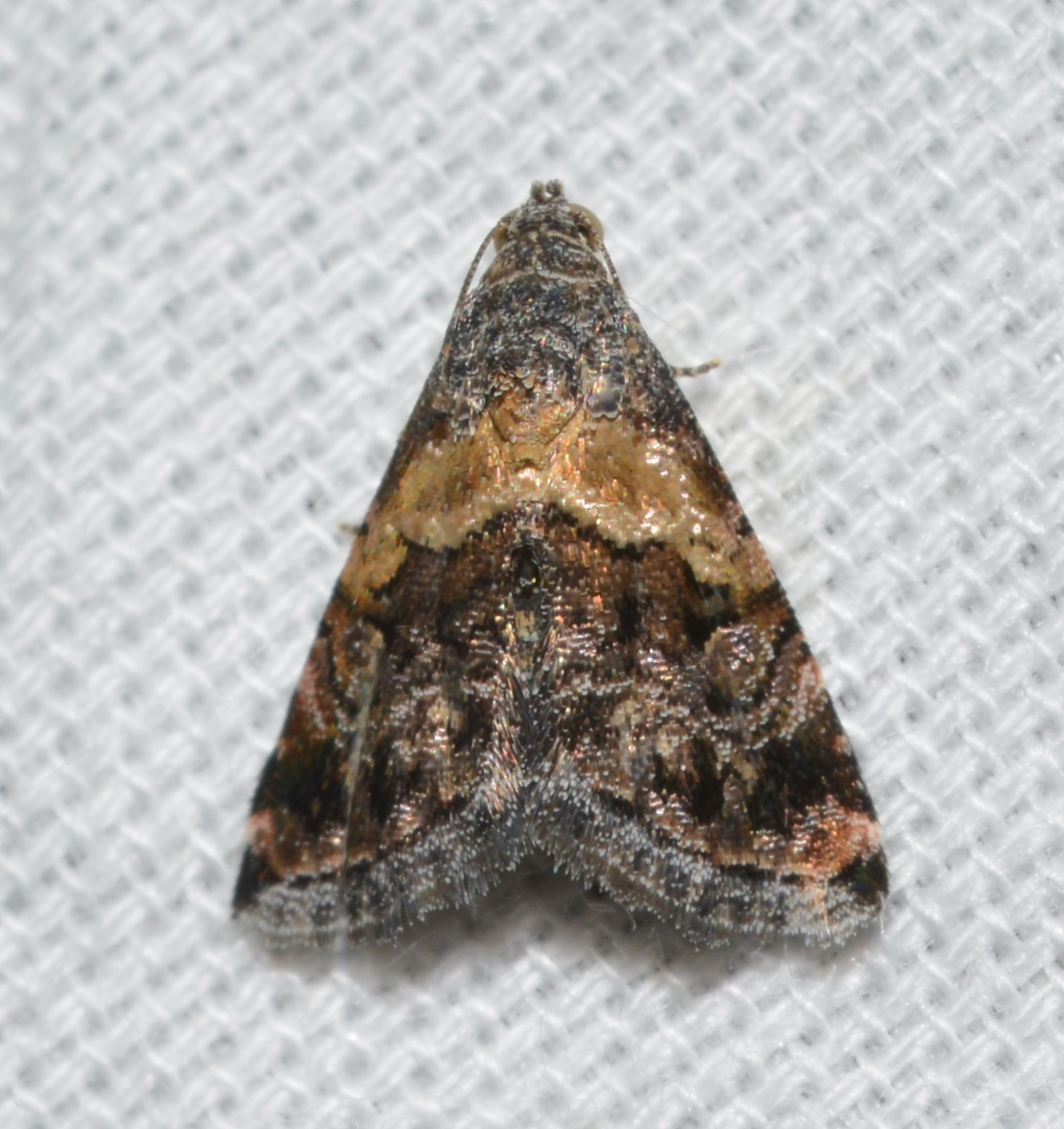

Scientific classification
- Domain: Eukaryota
- Kingdom: Animalia
- Phylum: Arthropoda
- Class: Insecta
- Order: Lepidoptera
- Superfamily: Noctuoidea
- Family: Noctuidae
- Genus: Tripudia
- Species: T. balteata

Binomial name
- Tripudia balteata Smith, 1900

= Tripudia balteata =

Species of moth

Tripudia balteata is a moth in the family Noctuidae (the owlet moths). The species was first described by Smith in 1900. It is found in North America.

The MONA or Hodges number for Tripudia balteata is 9005.
