= Tripudia grapholithoides =

Scientific classification
- Domain: Eukaryota
- Kingdom: Animalia
- Phylum: Arthropoda
- Class: Insecta
- Order: Lepidoptera
- Superfamily: Noctuoidea
- Family: Noctuidae
- Genus: Tripudia
- Species: T. grapholithoides

Binomial name
- Tripudia grapholithoides (Möschler, 1890)

Species of moth

Tripudia grapholithoides is a species of moth in the family Noctuidae (the owlet moths). It is found in the Caribbean Sea, North America, and South America.

The MONA or Hodges number for Tripudia grapholithoides is 9004.
