= Tripudia goyanensis =

Scientific classification
- Kingdom: Animalia
- Phylum: Arthropoda
- Class: Insecta
- Order: Lepidoptera
- Superfamily: Noctuoidea
- Family: Noctuidae
- Genus: Tripudia
- Species: T. goyanensis

Binomial name
- Tripudia goyanensis (Hampson, 1910)

Synonyms
- Tripudia olivacea (Grossbeck, 1917)

Species of moth

Tripudia goyanensis is a species of moth in the family Noctuidae (the owlet moths).

The MONA or Hodges number for Tripudia goyanensis is 9010.1.
