= Teinoptera olivina =

Scientific classification
- Domain: Eukaryota
- Kingdom: Animalia
- Phylum: Arthropoda
- Class: Insecta
- Order: Lepidoptera
- Superfamily: Noctuoidea
- Family: Erebidae
- Genus: Teinoptera
- Species: T. olivina

Binomial name
- Teinoptera olivina (Herrich-Schäffer, 1852)

Synonyms
- Copiphana olivina (Herrich-Schäffer, 1852); Cleophana olivina Herrich-Schäffer, 1852; Copiphana ferrieri (Bellier, 1857); Cleophana ferrieri Bellier, 1857

Species of moth

Teinoptera olivina is a moth of the family Noctuidae. It is found in Morocco, Spain, France, Switzerland, Italy, Austria, Yugoslavia, North Macedonia, Romania, Bulgaria, Albania, Greece, Turkey, Algeria, Tunisia, Arabia and Saudi Arabia.

Adults are on wing from May to July.

The larvae feed on Dianthus and Acantholiman species

== Subspecies ==
- Teinoptera olivina olivina
- Teinoptera olivina deliblatica (eastern Europe)
- Teinoptera olivina pseudoliva (Turkey)
