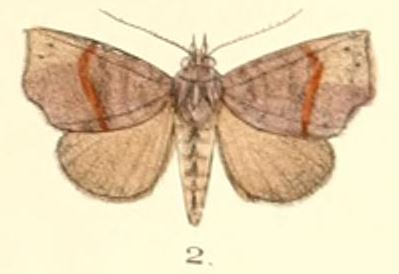

Scientific classification
- Domain: Eukaryota
- Kingdom: Animalia
- Phylum: Arthropoda
- Class: Insecta
- Order: Lepidoptera
- Superfamily: Noctuoidea
- Family: Erebidae
- Genus: Thalatta
- Species: T. fasciosa

Binomial name
- Thalatta fasciosa Moore, 1882

= Thalatta fasciosa =

Species of moth

Thalatta fasciosa is a moth of the family Erebidae first described by Frederic Moore in 1882. It is found in India and in Taiwan.

== Host plants ==
The larvae feed on Hiptage benghalensis (Malpighiaceae), Aspidopterys species and Combretum species (Combretaceae).
