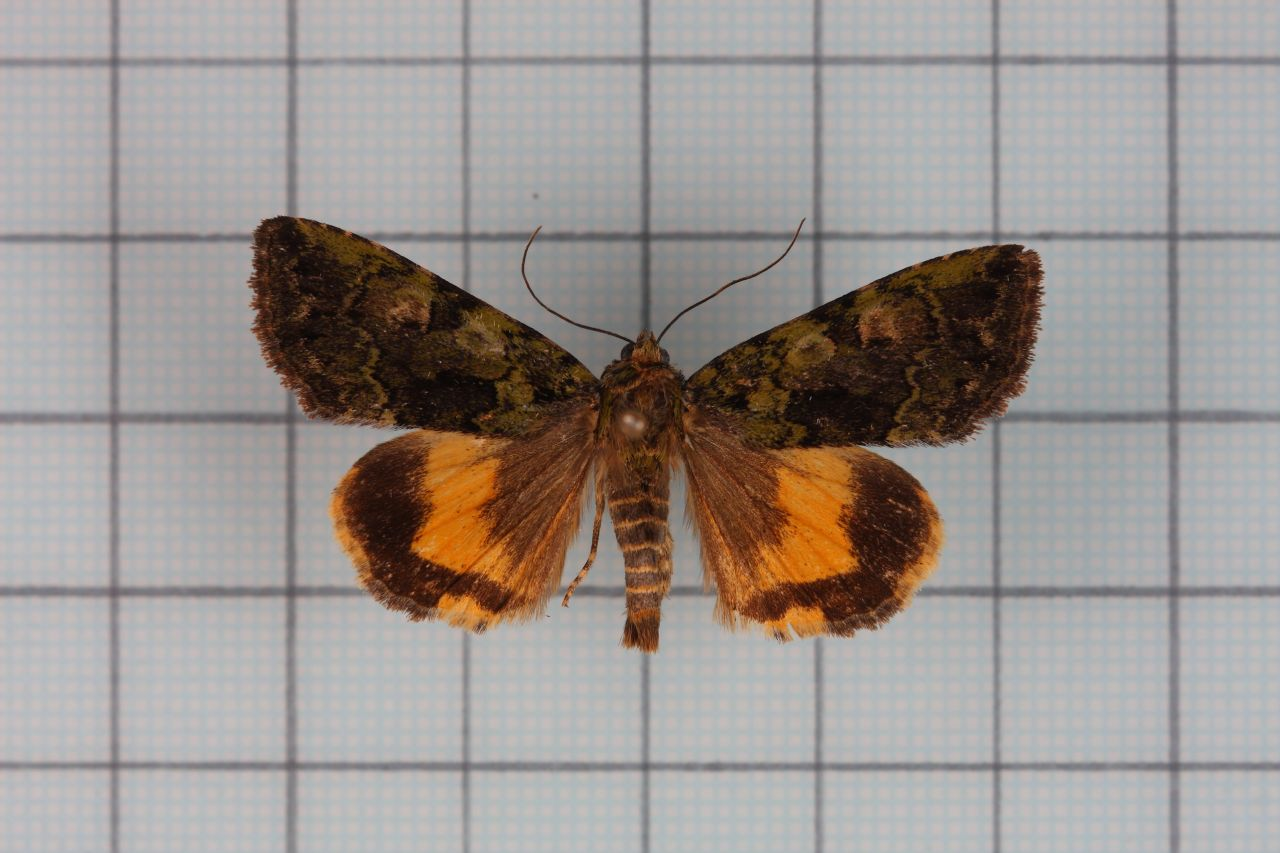

Scientific classification
- Kingdom: Animalia
- Phylum: Arthropoda
- Clade: Pancrustacea
- Class: Insecta
- Order: Lepidoptera
- Superfamily: Noctuoidea
- Family: Noctuidae
- Genus: Triphaenopsis
- Species: T. jezoensis

Binomial name
- Triphaenopsis jezoensis Sugi, 1962

= Triphaenopsis jezoensis =

Species of moth

Triphaenopsis jezoensis is a species of moth of the family Noctuidae. It is found in Japan and Taiwan.
