= Tripudia paraplesia =

Scientific classification
- Domain: Eukaryota
- Kingdom: Animalia
- Phylum: Arthropoda
- Class: Insecta
- Order: Lepidoptera
- Superfamily: Noctuoidea
- Family: Noctuidae
- Subfamily: Cobubathinae
- Genus: Tripudia
- Species: T. paraplesia

Binomial name
- Tripudia paraplesia Pogue, 2009

Species of moth

Tripudia paraplesia is a moth in the family Noctuidae first described by Michael G. Pogue in 2009. It is found in north-eastern Mexico. A single specimen was collected in the US state of Louisiana in 1994.
