= Teinoptera lunaki =

Scientific classification
- Domain: Eukaryota
- Kingdom: Animalia
- Phylum: Arthropoda
- Class: Insecta
- Order: Lepidoptera
- Superfamily: Noctuoidea
- Family: Erebidae
- Genus: Teinoptera
- Species: T. lunaki

Binomial name
- Teinoptera lunaki (Boursin, 1940)

Synonyms
- Copiphana lunaki Boursin, 1940

Species of moth

Teinoptera lunaki is a moth of the family Noctuidae. It is found in Yugoslavia, North Macedonia, Bulgaria and Greece.

Adults are on wing from May to June.

== Subspecies ==
- Teinoptera lunaki lunaki
- Teinoptera lunaki boursini (Greece)
- Teinoptera lunaki moreana (Greece)
