= Teinoptera gafsana =

Scientific classification
- Domain: Eukaryota
- Kingdom: Animalia
- Phylum: Arthropoda
- Class: Insecta
- Order: Lepidoptera
- Superfamily: Noctuoidea
- Family: Erebidae
- Genus: Teinoptera
- Species: T. gafsana

Binomial name
- Teinoptera gafsana (Blachier, 1905)

Synonyms
- Teinoptera gafsana (Blachier, 1905); Cleophana gafsana Blachier, 1905

Species of moth

Teinoptera gafsana is a moth of the family Noctuidae first described by Charles Theodore Blachier in 1905. It is found from Morocco through all north-western Africa to Libya. It is also found in the central Arabian deserts, Iraq and Israel.

Adults are on wing from February to April. There is one generation per year.
