= Tripudia munna =

Scientific classification
- Kingdom: Animalia
- Phylum: Arthropoda
- Clade: Pancrustacea
- Class: Insecta
- Order: Lepidoptera
- Superfamily: Noctuoidea
- Family: Noctuidae
- Genus: Tripudia
- Species: T. munna

Binomial name
- Tripudia munna (Dyar, 1916)

Species of moth

Tripudia munna is a species of moth in the family Noctuidae (the owlet moths).
