= Tadaxa bijungens =

Scientific classification
- Kingdom: Animalia
- Phylum: Arthropoda
- Clade: Pancrustacea
- Class: Insecta
- Order: Lepidoptera
- Superfamily: Noctuoidea
- Family: Erebidae
- Genus: Tadaxa
- Species: T. bijungens

Binomial name
- Tadaxa bijungens (Walker, 1865)

Synonyms
- Daxata bijungens Walker, 1865

Species of moth

Tadaxa bijungens is a moth of the family Noctuidae first described by Francis Walker in 1865. It is found in Sri Lanka.

Labial palps are longer, slender and upcurved. Antennae of male are fasciculate or ciliate.
