= Tathodelta purpurascens =

Scientific classification
- Kingdom: Animalia
- Phylum: Arthropoda
- Class: Insecta
- Order: Lepidoptera
- Superfamily: Noctuoidea
- Family: Erebidae
- Genus: Tathodelta
- Species: T. purpurascens

Binomial name
- Tathodelta purpurascens Hampson, 1893

Synonyms
- Tathodelta malayana Hampson, 1926

Species of moth

Tathodelta purpurascens is a moth of the family Noctuidae first described by George Hampson in 1893. It is found in India, Sri Lanka, Borneo and Bali.

Its forewings have a uniform purplish tinge. Pale postmedial strongly curved subcostally. The caterpillar is greenish. Head is glossy and whitish green. Pupa lacks a bloom. Larval host plant is Allophylus.
