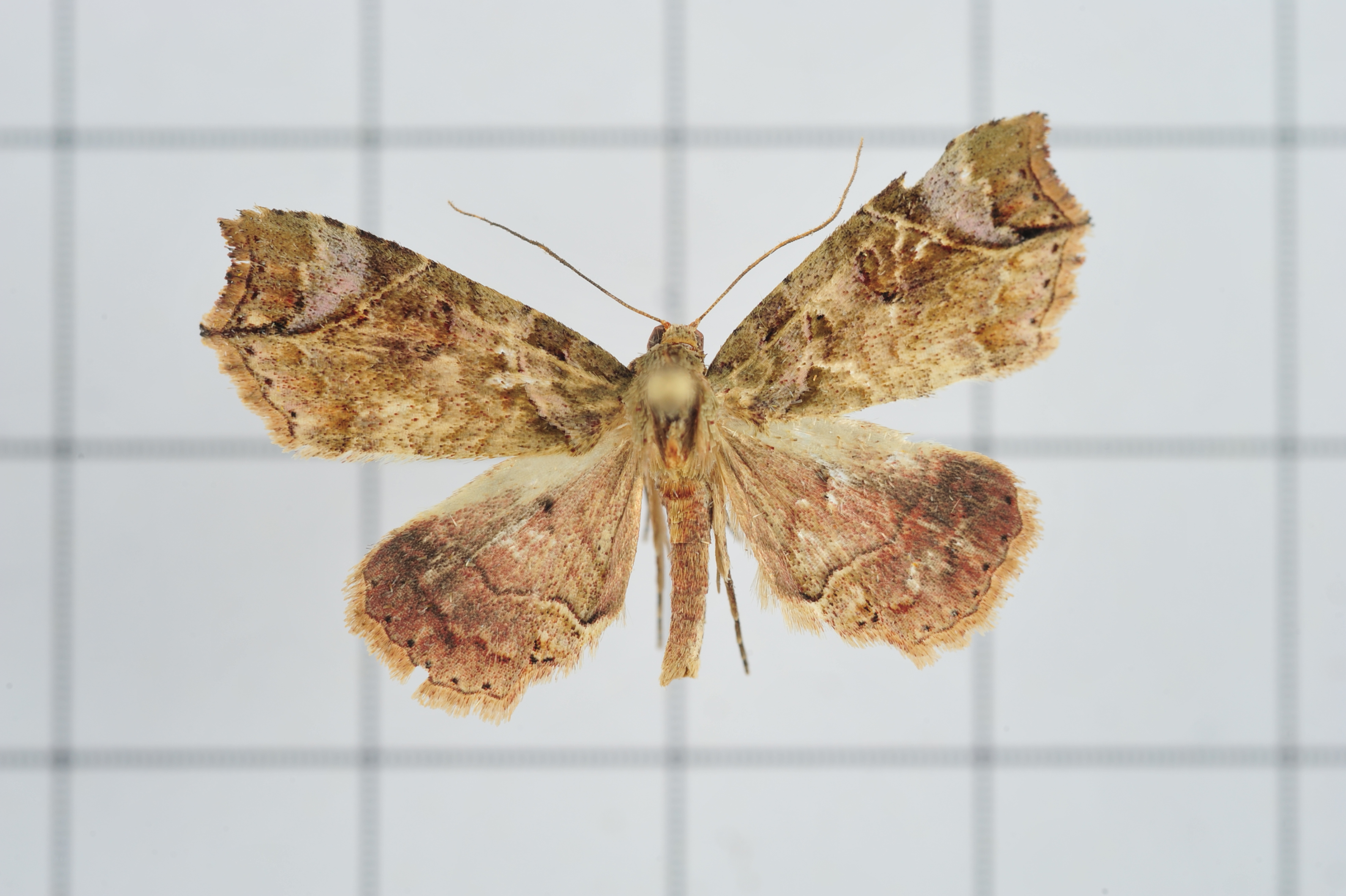

Scientific classification
- Kingdom: Animalia
- Phylum: Arthropoda
- Clade: Pancrustacea
- Class: Insecta
- Order: Lepidoptera
- Superfamily: Noctuoidea
- Family: Erebidae
- Genus: Tipasa
- Species: T. renalis

Binomial name
- Tipasa renalis Moore, 1885

Synonyms
- Corgatha renalis Moore, [1885]

= Tipasa renalis =

Species of moth

Tipasa renalis is a moth of the family Noctuidae first described by Frederic Moore in 1885. It is found in Sri Lanka, Taiwan and Borneo.

A subapical dark brown triangle is found on the costa. An irregular, pale zigzag submarginal encloses a dark brown area in the interior half of the marginal zone.
