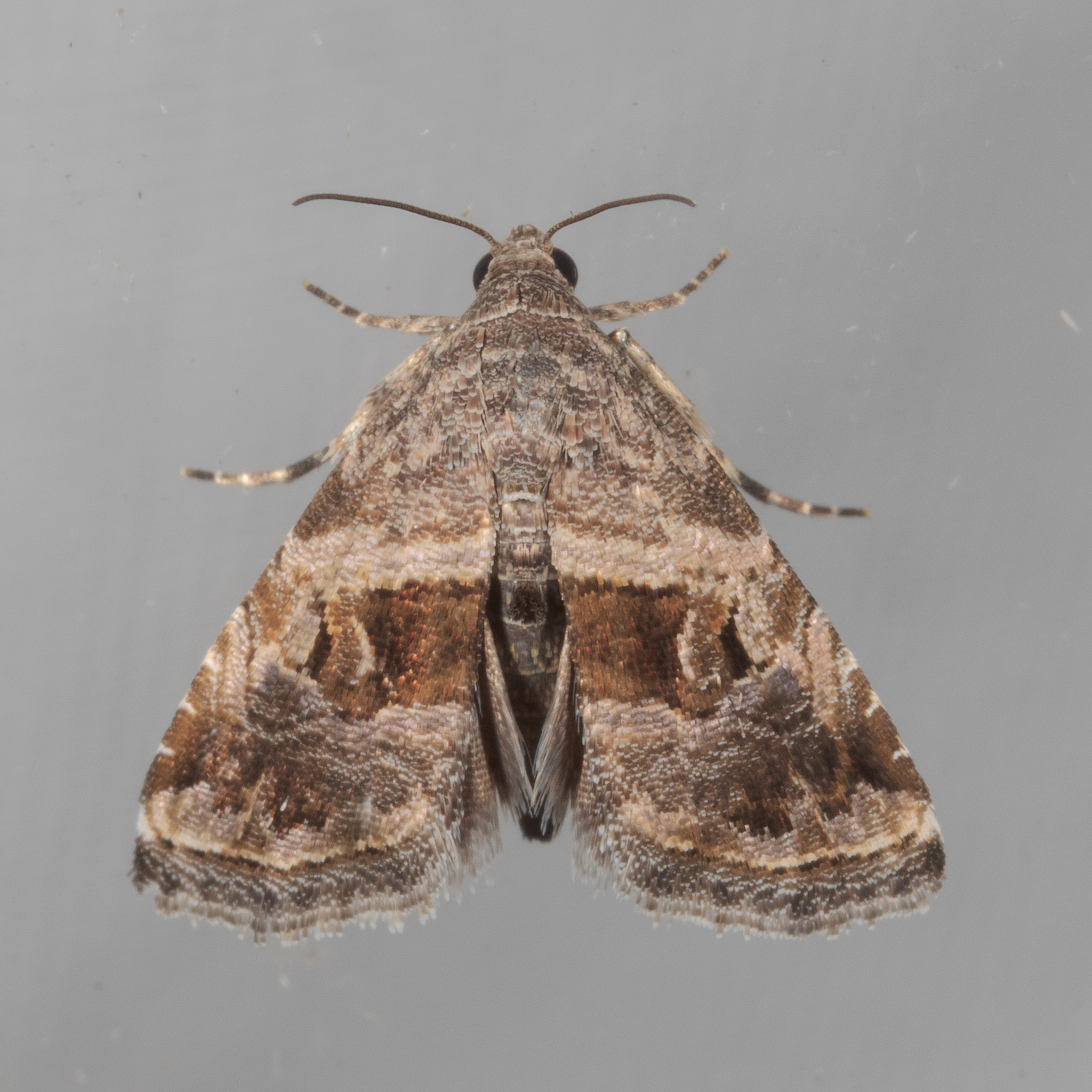

Scientific classification
- Kingdom: Animalia
- Phylum: Arthropoda
- Clade: Pancrustacea
- Class: Insecta
- Order: Lepidoptera
- Superfamily: Noctuoidea
- Family: Noctuidae
- Genus: Tripudia
- Species: T. quadrifera

Binomial name
- Tripudia quadrifera (Zeller, 1874)

= Tripudia quadrifera =

Species of moth

Tripudia quadrifera is a species of moth in the family Noctuidae (the owlet moths).
