= Cophanta funestalis =

Scientific classification
- Kingdom: Animalia
- Phylum: Arthropoda
- Class: Insecta
- Order: Lepidoptera
- Superfamily: Noctuoidea
- Family: Noctuidae
- Genus: Cophanta
- Species: C. funestalis

Binomial name
- Cophanta funestalis Walker, 1864

Synonyms
- Erastria anthracina Snellen, 1880; Tarache optiva Swinhoe, 1890

Species of moth

Cophanta funestalis is a moth of the family Noctuidae first described by Francis Walker in 1864. It is found in Indo-Australian tropics of India, Sri Lanka, Thailand, Borneo, New Guinea and Australia.

Forewings brownish with variable pale spots and dark bands. Hindwings whitish without markings.
