= Tripudia chihuahua =

Scientific classification
- Domain: Eukaryota
- Kingdom: Animalia
- Phylum: Arthropoda
- Class: Insecta
- Order: Lepidoptera
- Superfamily: Noctuoidea
- Family: Noctuidae
- Genus: Tripudia
- Species: T. chihuahua

Binomial name
- Tripudia chihuahua A. Blanchard & Knudson, 1984

Species of moth

Tripudia chihuahua is a species of moth in the family Noctuidae (the owlet moths). It is found in North America.

The MONA or Hodges number for Tripudia chihuahua is 9004.1.
