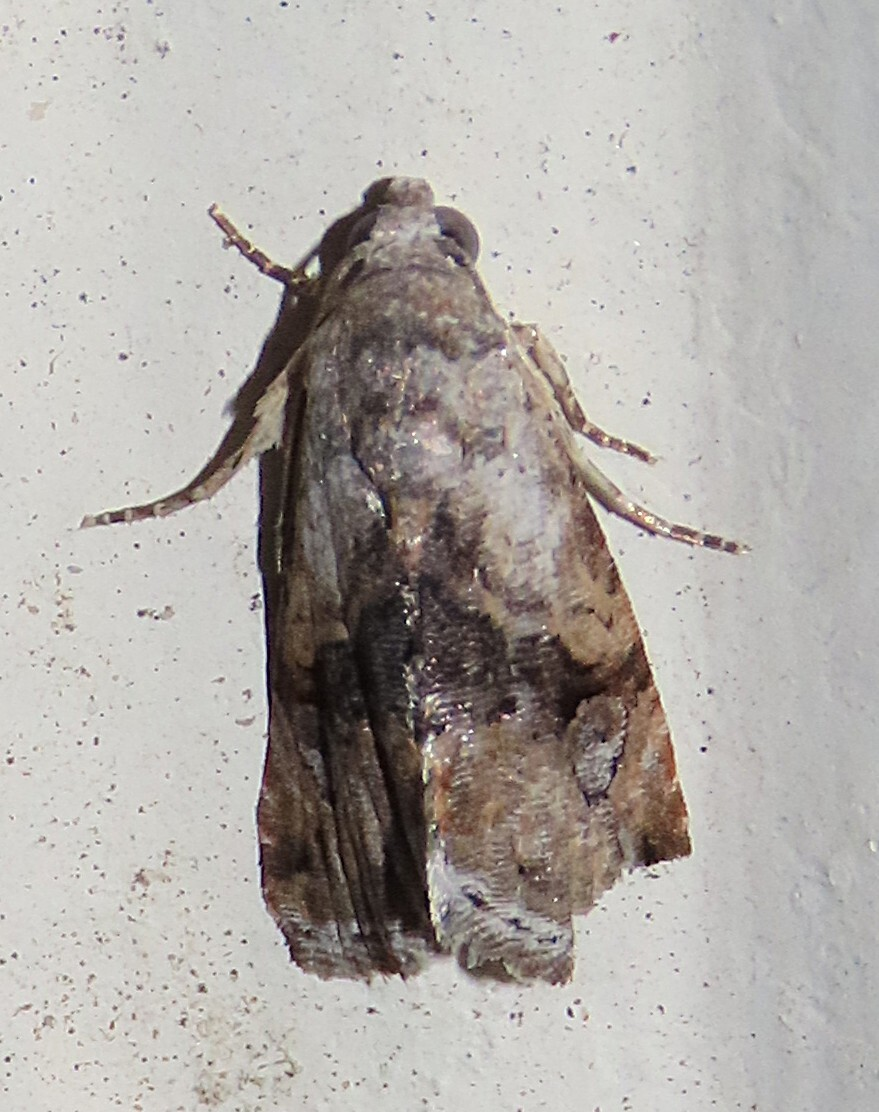

Scientific classification
- Kingdom: Animalia
- Phylum: Arthropoda
- Clade: Pancrustacea
- Class: Insecta
- Order: Lepidoptera
- Superfamily: Noctuoidea
- Family: Noctuidae
- Genus: Tripudia
- Species: T. damozela

Binomial name
- Tripudia damozela (Dyar, 1914)

Synonyms
- Tripudia inquaesita (Barnes & Benjamin, 1924)

= Tripudia damozela =

Species of moth

Tripudia damozela is a species of moth in the family Noctuidae (the owlet moths). It was first described by Harrison Gray Dyar Jr. in 1914 and it is found in Central and North America.
