= Toxophleps =

Scientific classification
- Kingdom: Animalia
- Phylum: Arthropoda
- Class: Insecta
- Order: Lepidoptera
- Superfamily: Noctuoidea
- Family: Noctuidae
- Subfamily: Acontiinae
- Genus: Toxophleps; Hampson, 1893

Genus of moths

Toxophleps is a genus of moths of the family Noctuidae erected by George Hampson in 1893. The species are transferred in to Tarache. The Global Lepidoptera Names Index and Lepidoptera and Some Other Life Forms describe this genus as a synonym of Cophanta.

== Description ==
Palpi are upturned, where the second joint reaches the vertex of the head, and roughly scaled. The third joint is short. The antennae are minutely ciliated in male. The thorax is smoothly scaled. Abdomen with dorsal tufts on proximal segments. The tibia is naked. Forewings with nearly rectangular apex. Veins 7 to 9 stalked. Hindwings with veins 6 and 7 stalked.
