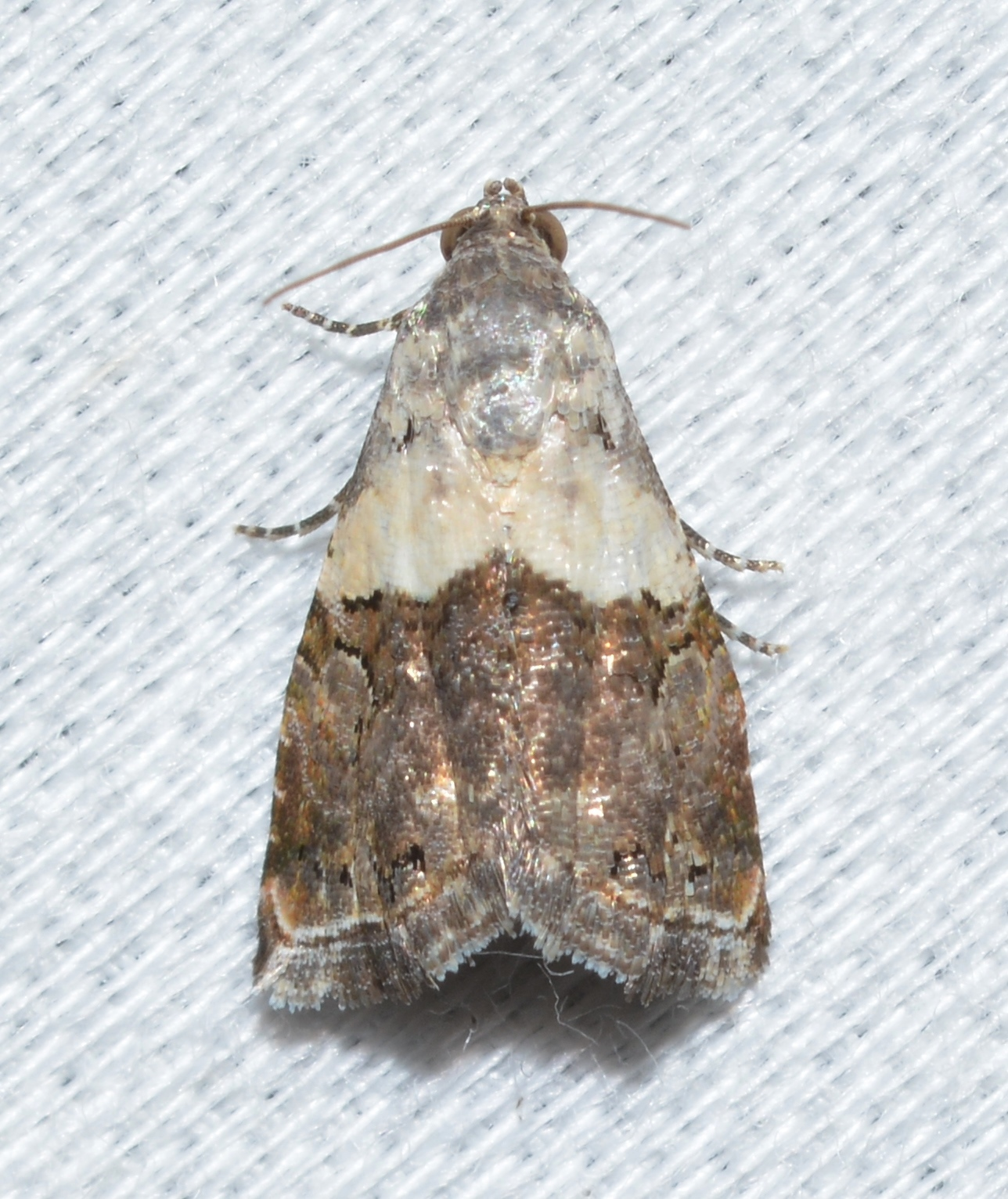

Scientific classification
- Domain: Eukaryota
- Kingdom: Animalia
- Phylum: Arthropoda
- Class: Insecta
- Order: Lepidoptera
- Superfamily: Noctuoidea
- Family: Noctuidae
- Genus: Tripudia
- Species: T. dimidata

Binomial name
- Tripudia dimidata (Smith, 1905)

= Tripudia dimidata =

Species of moth

Tripudia dimidata is a moth in the family Noctuidae (the owlet moths) first described by Smith in 1905.

The MONA or Hodges number for Tripudia dimidata is 9007.
