= Trichoblemma =

Scientific classification
- Kingdom: Animalia
- Phylum: Arthropoda
- Class: Insecta
- Order: Lepidoptera
- Superfamily: Noctuoidea
- Family: Erebidae
- Subfamily: Calpinae
- Genus: Trichoblemma; Hampson, 1926

Genus of moths

Trichoblemma is a genus of moths of the family Erebidae. The genus was erected by George Hampson in 1926.

== Species ==
- Trichoblemma badia (Swinhoe, 1903) Peninsular Malaysia, Sumatra, Borneo
- Trichoblemma lophophora (Hampson, 1895) Myanmar
- Trichoblemma major Roepke, 1938 Sulawesi
