= Thursania =

Scientific classification
- Domain: Eukaryota
- Kingdom: Animalia
- Phylum: Arthropoda
- Class: Insecta
- Order: Lepidoptera
- Superfamily: Noctuoidea
- Family: Erebidae
- Subfamily: Herminiinae
- Genus: Thursania; Schaus, 1913

Genus of moths

Thursania is a genus of moths of the family Erebidae. The genus was described by William Schaus in 1913.

== Species ==
- Thursania aristarioides Schaus, 1916 Cuba
- Thursania chiriqualis Schaus, 1916 Panama
- Thursania costigutta (Herrich-Schäffer, 1870) Cuba
- Thursania decocta Schaus, 1913 Costa Rica
- Thursania espiritualis Schaus, 1916 Brazil (Espírito Santo)
- Thursania grandirenalis Schaus, 1916 Venezuela
- Thursania hobsonalis Schaus, 1916 Cuba
- Thursania lycas (H. Druce, 1891) Guatemala
- Thursania lycimnia (H. Druce, 1891) Mexico
- Thursania mallalialis Dognin, 1914 Guyana
- Thursania miaralis Schaus, 1916 Cuba
- Thursania ordenalis (Schaus, 1906) Brazil (São Paulo)
- Thursania servilis Schaus, 1913 Costa Rica
- Thursania tigurialis Schaus, 1916 Peru
- Thursania voodoalis Schaus, 1916 Cuba
