= Tipra latipes =

Scientific classification
- Kingdom: Animalia
- Phylum: Arthropoda
- Class: Insecta
- Order: Lepidoptera
- Superfamily: Noctuoidea
- Family: Erebidae
- Genus: Tipra; Walker, 1869
- Species: T. latipes

Binomial name
- Tipra latipes Walker, 1869

Species of moth

Tipra latipes is the only species in the monotypic moth genus Tipra of the family Erebidae. It is found in Guiana. Both the genus and species were first described by Francis Walker in 1869.
