= Teinoptera =

Scientific classification
- Domain: Eukaryota
- Kingdom: Animalia
- Phylum: Arthropoda
- Class: Insecta
- Order: Lepidoptera
- Superfamily: Noctuoidea
- Family: Erebidae
- Subfamily: Calpinae
- Genus: Teinoptera; Calberla, 1891

Synonyms
- Copiphana Hampson, 1906

Genus of moths

Teinoptera is a genus of moths of the family Noctuidae.

== Species ==
- Teinoptera culminifera Calberla, 1891
- Teinoptera gafsana (Blachier, 1905)
- Teinoptera lunaki Boursin, 1940
- Teinoptera oliva Staudinger, 1895
- Teinoptera olivina (Herrich-Schäffer, 1852)
