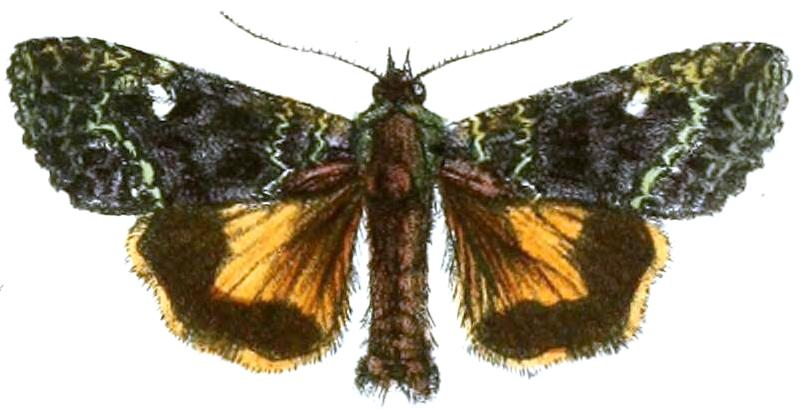

Scientific classification
- Kingdom: Animalia
- Phylum: Arthropoda
- Class: Insecta
- Order: Lepidoptera
- Superfamily: Noctuoidea
- Family: Noctuidae
- Genus: Triphaenopsis; Butler, 1878

= Triphaenopsis =

Genus of moths

Triphaenopsis is a genus of moths of the family Noctuidae.

== Species ==
- Triphaenopsis cinerescens Butler, 1855
- Triphaenopsis diminuta Butler, 1889
- Triphaenopsis ella Strand, 1920
- Triphaenopsis indica (Moore, 1881)
- Triphaenopsis inepta Butler, 1889
- Triphaenopsis insolita Remm, 1983
- Triphaenopsis jezoensis Sugi, 1962
- Triphaenopsis lucilla Butler, 1878
- Triphaenopsis postflava (Leech, 1900)
