= Tympanobasis =

Scientific classification
- Kingdom: Animalia
- Phylum: Arthropoda
- Class: Insecta
- Order: Lepidoptera
- Superfamily: Noctuoidea
- Family: Erebidae
- Subfamily: Calpinae
- Genus: Tympanobasis; Hampson, 1926

Genus of moths

Tympanobasis (Ancient Greek: τύμπανο + βάσις) is a genus of moths of the family Noctuidae. The genus was erected by George Hampson in 1926. The three described species live in Central America.

== Species ==
- Tympanobasis pterogoneis Hampson, 1926
- Tympanobasis thyrsipalpis Hampson, 1926
- Tympanobasis tumidicosta Hampson, 1926
