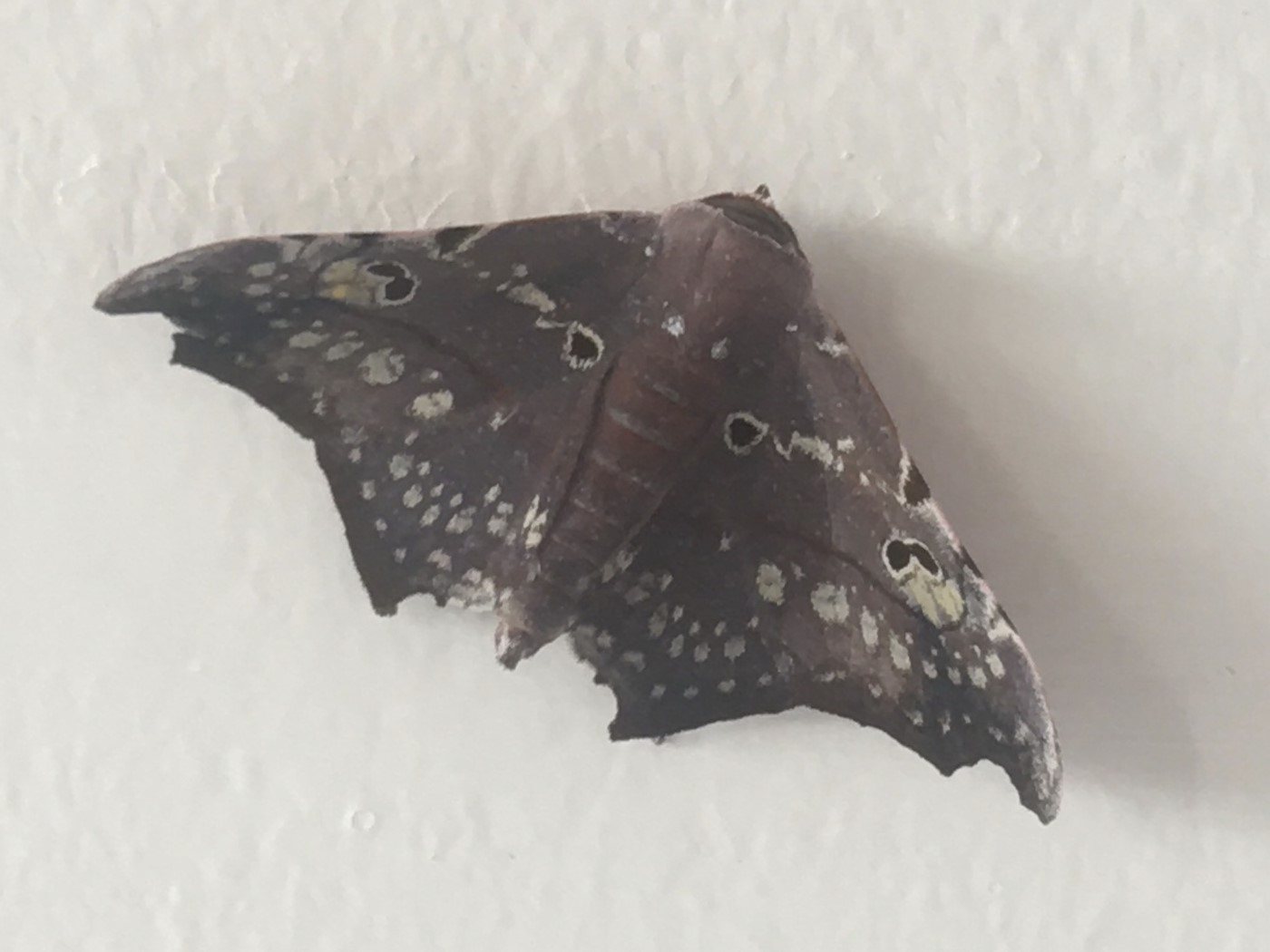
- Tautobriga euspila

Scientific classification
- Kingdom: Animalia
- Phylum: Arthropoda
- Class: Insecta
- Order: Lepidoptera
- Superfamily: Noctuoidea
- Family: Erebidae
- Subfamily: Calpinae
- Genus: Tautobriga; Walker, 1869

= Tautobriga =

Genus of moths

Tautobriga is a genus of moths in the family Erebidae. The genus was erected by Francis Walker in 1869.

== Species ==
- Tautobriga erythropus (Felder & Rogenhofer, 1874) Colombia
- Tautobriga euspila Walker, 1869 Honduras
- Tautobriga glaucopis Hampson, 1926 Peru
