= Tigreana =

Scientific classification
- Domain: Eukaryota
- Kingdom: Animalia
- Phylum: Arthropoda
- Class: Insecta
- Order: Lepidoptera
- Superfamily: Noctuoidea
- Family: Noctuidae (?)
- Subfamily: Catocalinae
- Genus: Tigreana; Laporte, 1991

Genus of moths

Tigreana is a genus, of moths, of the family Noctuidae. The genus was described by Bernard Laporte in 1991.

== Species ==
Species from Africa:

- Tigreana elodiae Laporte, 1991
- Tigreana nathaliannae Laporte, 1991
- Tigreana sandrae Laporte, 1991
- Tigreana superba Laporte, 1991
