= Tolnaodes =

Scientific classification
- Kingdom: Animalia
- Phylum: Arthropoda
- Class: Insecta
- Order: Lepidoptera
- Superfamily: Noctuoidea
- Family: Noctuidae (?)
- Subfamily: Catocalinae
- Genus: Tolnaodes; Hampson, 1913
- Species: T. dasynota

Binomial name
- Tolnaodes dasynota Felder, 1874

Genus of moths

Tolnaodes is a monotypic moth genus of the family Noctuidae erected by George Hampson in 1913. Its only species, Tolnaodes dasynota, was first described by Felder in 1874. It is found in French Guiana.

== Subspecies ==
- Tolnaodes dasynota calocraspeda Prout, 1919
