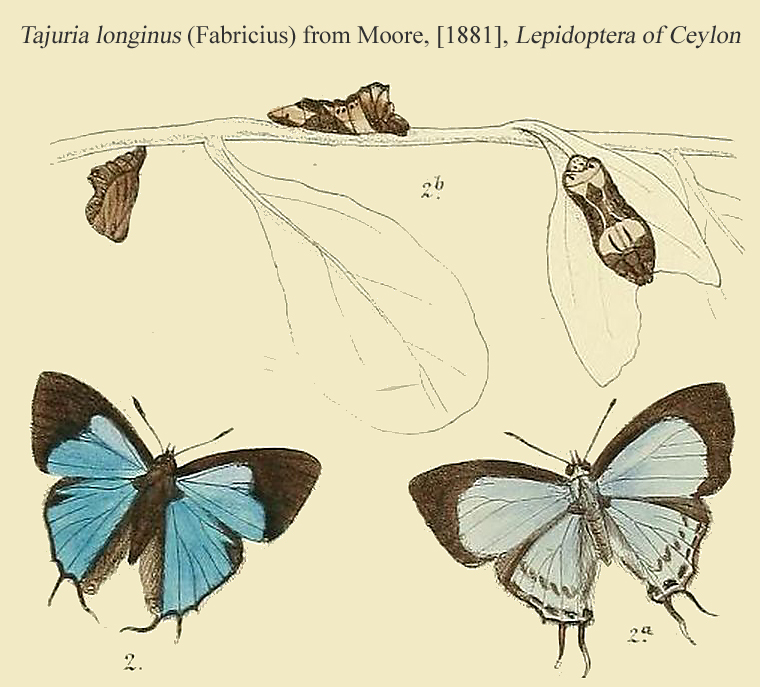

Scientific classification
- Kingdom: Animalia
- Phylum: Arthropoda
- Class: Insecta
- Order: Lepidoptera
- Superfamily: Noctuoidea
- Family: Noctuidae
- Subfamily: Acontiinae
- Genus: Cophanta; Walker, 1864

= Cophanta =

Genus of moths

Cophanta is a genus of moths of the family Noctuidae.

== Species ==
- Cophanta funestalis Walker, 1864
- Cophanta occidentalis Hampson, 1910
