= Taseopteryx =

Scientific classification
- Kingdom: Animalia
- Phylum: Arthropoda
- Class: Insecta
- Order: Lepidoptera
- Superfamily: Noctuoidea
- Family: Noctuidae
- Subfamily: Acontiinae
- Genus: Taseopteryx; Butler, 1883
- Species: T. sericea

Binomial name
- Taseopteryx sericea Butler, 1883

Genus of moths

Taseopteryx is a monotypic moth genus of the family Noctuidae. Its only species, Taseopteryx sericea, is found in Chile. Both the genus and species were first described by Arthur Gardiner Butler in 1883.
