= Tegiapa =

Scientific classification
- Domain: Eukaryota
- Kingdom: Animalia
- Phylum: Arthropoda
- Class: Insecta
- Order: Lepidoptera
- Superfamily: Noctuoidea
- Family: Noctuidae
- Subfamily: Acontiinae
- Genus: Tegiapa; Nye, 1975

Synonyms
- Pagetia A. E. Prout, 1922

Genus of moths

Tegiapa is a genus of moths of the family Noctuidae. The genus was described by Nye in 1975.

== Species ==
- Tegiapa aarviki Hacker, 2019 Gabon, Uganda, Ethiopia
- Tegiapa aberdarensis Hacker, 2019 Kenya
- Tegiapa agassizi Hacker, 2019 Ethiopia, Kenya, Tanzania, South Africa
- Tegiapa ambiguosa Hacker, Fiebig & Stadie, 2019 Ethiopia
- Tegiapa catalai Hacker, 2019 Madagascar
- Tegiapa comorana (Viette, 1981) Comoros
- Tegiapa craspedica (Hampson, 1910) Ghana, Nigeria, Congo, Equatorial Guinea, Gabon, Angola, Uganda
- Tegiapa forsteri Hacker, 2019 Tanzania
- Tegiapa goateri Hacker, 2019 South Africa, Swaziland, Zimbabwe
- Tegiapa griseaxea Hacker, 2019 Kenya, Uganda
- Tegiapa kingstoni Hacker, 2019 Kenya, Uganda, Zimbabwe
- Tegiapa larentiodes (Prout, 1922) South Africa, Zaire, Ghana
- Tegiapa lenzi Hacker, 2019 Zimbabwe
- Tegiapa melanochra Hacker, 2019 São Tomé & Principe
- Tegiapa melanoleuca Hacker, 2019 Zambia, South Africa
- Tegiapa microplexia (Viette, 1962) Madagascar
- Tegiapa nana Hacker, 2019 South Africa
- Tegiapa nigrilineata (Hampson, 1916) Somalia
- Tegiapa obliqua Hacker, Fiebig & Stadie, 2019 Ethiopia, Kenya
- Tegiapa politzari Hacker, 2019 Ethiopia, Kenya, Uganda, Malawi, Rwanda, Tanzania
- Tegiapa schreieri Hacker, 2019 Ethiopia, Tanzania, Uganda, Cameroon
- Tegiapa steganioides Hacker, Fiebig & Stadie, 2019 Nigeria, Gabon, Ethiopia, Uganda, Tanzania
- Tegiapa ugandana Hacker, 2019 Uganda
- Tegiapa vanjamanitra (Viette, 1981) Madagascar
- Tegiapa virescens (Hampson, 1910) South Africa
