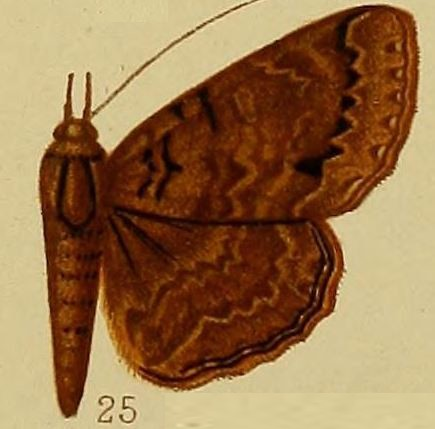
- Tavia plicata

Scientific classification
- Kingdom: Animalia
- Phylum: Arthropoda
- Class: Insecta
- Order: Lepidoptera
- Superfamily: Noctuoidea
- Family: Erebidae
- Subfamily: Calpinae
- Genus: Tavia; Walker, 1858

= Tavia =

Genus of moths

Tavia is a genus of moths of the family Erebidae. The genus was erected by Francis Walker in 1858.

== Species ==
- Tavia albilinea Walker, 1865 Bengal
- Tavia instruens Walker, 1858 Zaire, Kenya, South Africa
- Tavia latebra Hampson, 1926 Mozambique, South Africa
- Tavia nana Hampson, 1926 southern Nigeria
- Tavia nycterina (Boisduval, 1833) São Tome, Cameroon, Zaire, Kenya, Mozambique, South Africa, Zambia, Madagascar
- Tavia nyctombra Hampson, 1926 Sierra Leone
- Tavia plicata Hampson, 1910
- Tavia polycyma Hampson, 1926 Sierra Leone, Cameroon, Zaire
