= Trachysmatis =

Scientific classification
- Domain: Eukaryota
- Kingdom: Animalia
- Phylum: Arthropoda
- Class: Insecta
- Order: Lepidoptera
- Superfamily: Noctuoidea
- Family: Erebidae
- Subfamily: Herminiinae
- Genus: Trachysmatis; Schaus, 1916

Genus of moths

Trachysmatis is a genus of moths of the family Erebidae. The genus was described by William Schaus in 1916.

== Species ==
- Trachysmatis ignobilis Schaus, 1916 Panama
- Trachysmatis mogia Schaus, 1916 French Guiana
