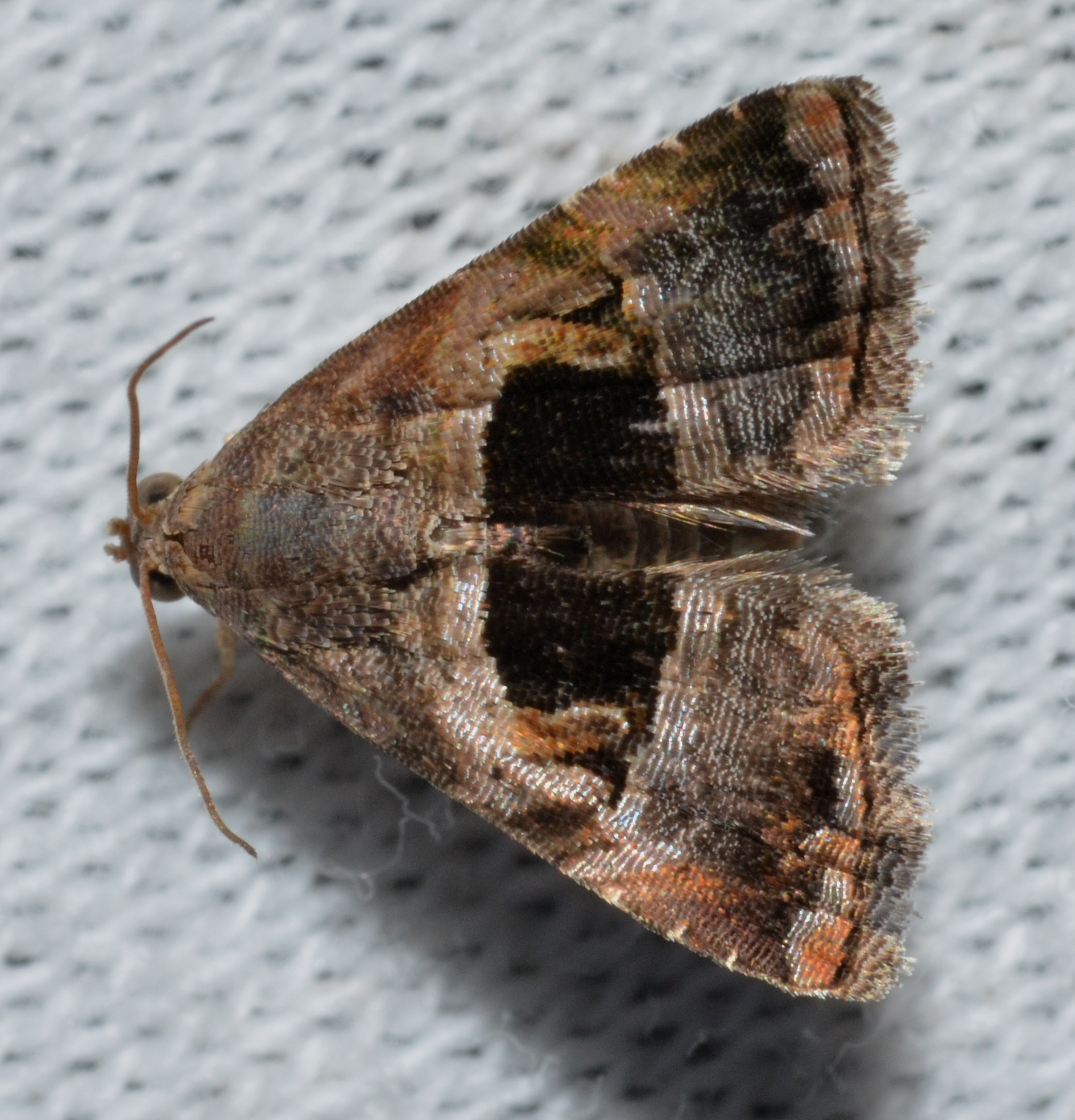
- Tripudia rectangula

Scientific classification
- Kingdom: Animalia
- Phylum: Arthropoda
- Class: Insecta
- Order: Lepidoptera
- Superfamily: Noctuoidea
- Family: Noctuidae
- Subfamily: Cobubathinae
- Genus: Tripudia; Grote, 1877

= Tripudia =

Genus of moths

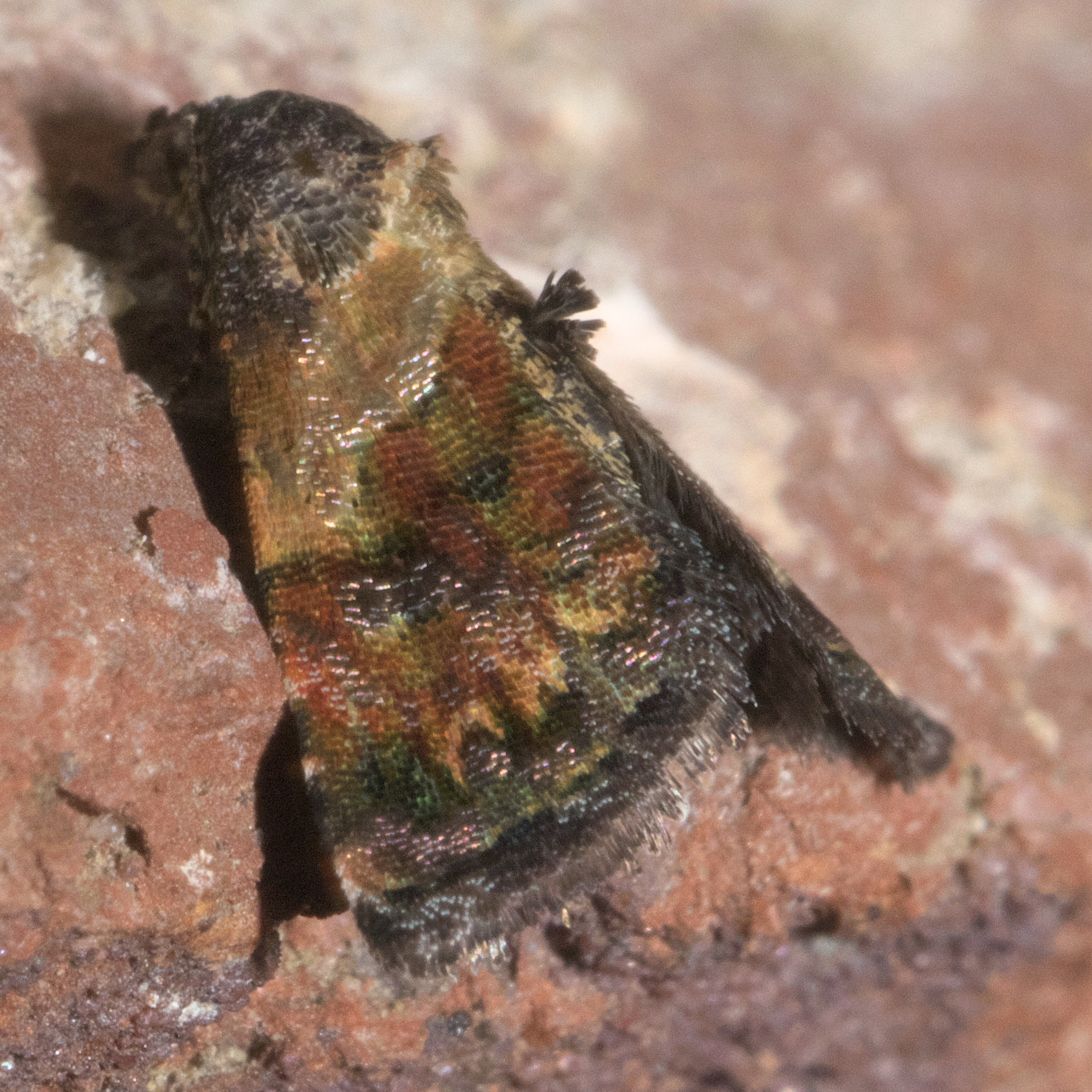
Tripudia

Tripudia is a genus of moths of the family Noctuidae. The genus was erected by Augustus Radcliffe Grote in 1877.

== Species ==
- Tripudia balteata Smith, 1900
- Tripudia bipars Hampson, 1910
- Tripudia catada Druce, 1889
- Tripudia chihuahua Blanchard & Knudson, 1984
- Tripudia coamona Schaus, 1940
- Tripudia damozela Dyar, 1914 (syn: Tripudia inquaesita Barnes & Benjamin, 1924)
- Tripudia dimidata Smith, 1905
- Tripudia dreptica Dyar, 1914
- Tripudia euproptopa Dyar, 1914
- Tripudia flavofasciata Grote, 1877
- Tripudia gilda Druce, 1889
- Tripudia goyanensis (Hampson, 1910) (syn: Tripudia olivacea (Grossbeck, 1917))
- Tripudia grapholithoides Möschler, 1890
- Tripudia hirasa Druce, 1889
- Tripudia icria Dyar, 1914
- Tripudia idicra Druce, 1889
- Tripudia lamina Pogue, 2009
- Tripudia ipilla Dyar, 1916
- Tripudia limbatus H. Edwards, 1881
- Tripudia luda Druce, 1898
- Tripudia luxuriosa Smith, 1900
- Tripudia millidice Dyar, 1914
- Tripudia monada Dyar, 1914
- Tripudia munna Dyar, 1916
- Tripudia nubidice Dyar, 1919
- Tripudia ochrocraspis Hampson, 1910
- Tripudia orcidia Druce, 1898
- Tripudia orthodoxica Dyar, 1914
- Tripudia paidica Dyar, 1914
- Tripudia paistion Dyar, 1914
- Tripudia paraplesia Pogue, 2009
- Tripudia periusia Dyar, 1914
- Tripudia petulans Draudt, 1928
- Tripudia pinax Dyar, 1914
- Tripudia punctifinis Hampson, 1910
- Tripudia quadrifera Zeller, 1874
- Tripudia rectangula Pogue, 2009
- Tripudia rilla Dyar, 1913
- Tripudia rustica Dyar, 1918
- Tripudia scobina Draudt, 1928
- Tripudia semipallida Hampson, 1910
- Tripudia subterminata Hampson, 1910
- Tripudia tortricopsis Dyar, 1914
- Tripudia umbrifera Hampson, 1910
- Tripudia versutus H. Edwards, 1881
