= Taphonia =

Scientific classification
- Domain: Eukaryota
- Kingdom: Animalia
- Phylum: Arthropoda
- Class: Insecta
- Order: Lepidoptera
- Superfamily: Noctuoidea
- Family: Erebidae
- Subfamily: Herminiinae
- Genus: Taphonia; Schaus, 1916

Genus of moths

Taphonia is a genus of moths of the family Erebidae. The genus was described by William Schaus in 1916.

== Species ==
- Taphonia griseirena Schaus, 1916 Mexico
- Taphonia lysis (H. Druce, 1891) Mexico, Costa Rica, Guatemala
- Taphonia muscosa (H. Druce, 1890) Mexico
- Taphonia peonis Schaus, 1916 Mexico
- Taphonia semifasciata Schaus, 1916 Mexico
- Taphonia testacealis Dyar, 1918 Mexico
