= Thalerastria =

Scientific classification
- Domain: Eukaryota
- Kingdom: Animalia
- Phylum: Arthropoda
- Class: Insecta
- Order: Lepidoptera
- Superfamily: Noctuoidea
- Family: Noctuidae
- Subfamily: Acontiinae
- Genus: Thalerastria; Staudinger, 1898

Genus of moths

Thalerastria is a genus of moths of the family Noctuidae. The genus was described by Staudinger in 1898.

== Taxonomy ==
Butterflies and Moths of the World gives this name as a synonym of Eulocastra Butler, 1886.

== Species ==
- Thalerastria alfierii Wiltshire, 1948 Arabia
- Thalerastria diaphora (Staudinger, 1878) Algeria, Morocco, Turkey, Israel, Jordan, Lebanon, Armenia, Syria, Iran, Iraq, Kazakhstan, Afghanistan, Pakistan, southern European Russia, Arabia, Egypt, Sudan, Eritrea, India
- Thalerastria hampsoni (Hacker, 2016) Somalia
- Thalerastria lehmanni Hoppe & Fibiger, 2009 Morocco, Libya, Tunisia, Spain
- Thalerastria meyi (Hacker, 2016) South Africa
- Thalerastria ochrographa (Hacker & Saldaitis, 2016) Oman
- Thalerastria phaeoxantha (Hacker, 2016) Ethiopia, Kenya
- Thalerastria rex Wiltshire, 1948 Arabia
- Thalerastria saldaitis (Hacker, 2016) Sokotra
- Thalerastria tenuifascia (Hacker, 2016) Kenya
