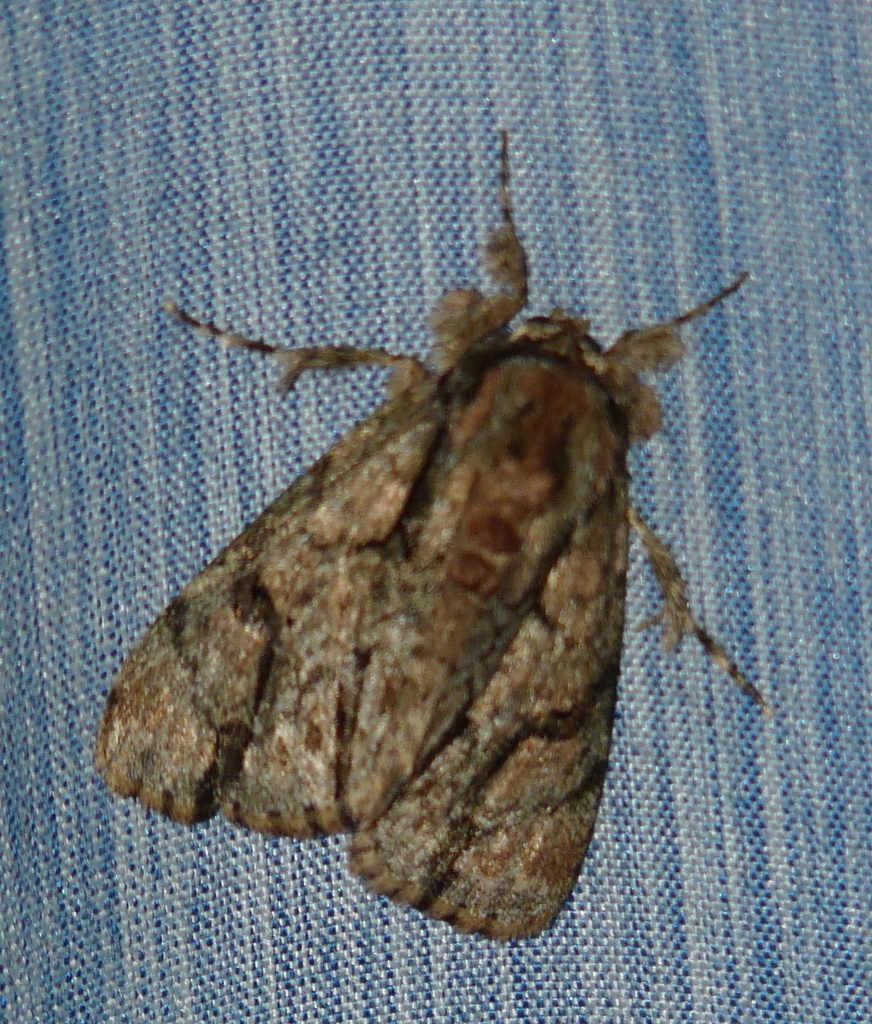

Scientific classification
- Kingdom: Animalia
- Phylum: Arthropoda
- Class: Insecta
- Order: Lepidoptera
- Superfamily: Noctuoidea
- Family: Noctuidae
- Genus: Tanocryx; Viette, 1965

= Tanocryx =

Genus of moths

Tanocryx is a genus of moths in the family Noctuidae.
