= Talariga =

Scientific classification
- Kingdom: Animalia
- Phylum: Arthropoda
- Class: Insecta
- Order: Lepidoptera
- Superfamily: Noctuoidea
- Family: Erebidae
- Subfamily: Calpinae
- Genus: Talariga; Walker, 1858

Genus of moths

Talariga is a genus of moths of the family Erebidae. The genus was erected by Francis Walker in 1858.

== Species ==
- Talariga albomaculata (Kenrick, 1917) Madagascar
- Talariga capacior Walker, 1858 north-eastern Himalayas, Vietnam, Peninsular Malaysia, Singapore, Sumatra, Borneo, Java, Philippines
