= Tadaxa =

Scientific classification
- Domain: Eukaryota
- Kingdom: Animalia
- Phylum: Arthropoda
- Class: Insecta
- Order: Lepidoptera
- Superfamily: Noctuoidea
- Family: Erebidae
- Subfamily: Calpinae
- Genus: Tadaxa; Nye, 1975

Synonyms
- Daxata Walker, 1865

Genus of moths

Tadaxa is a genus of moths of the family Erebidae. It was described by Nye in 1975.

== Description ==
Palpi with second joint reaching above vertex of head. Third joint with a tuft of hair on the inner side. Antennae of male with long bristles and cilia. Thorax and abdomen smoothly scaled. Tibia naked. Forewings with veins 8 and 9 anastomosing (fusing) to form a short areole. Hindwings with vein 5 from middle of discocellulars. Cilia of both wings are crenulate (scalloped).

== Species ==
- Tadaxa bijungens (Walker, 1865) Sri Lanka
- Tadaxa lilacina (Butler, 1889) Dharamshala
- Tadaxa lintona (Swinhoe, 1901) Borneo
