= Tesomonoda =

Scientific classification
- Domain: Eukaryota
- Kingdom: Animalia
- Phylum: Arthropoda
- Class: Insecta
- Order: Lepidoptera
- Superfamily: Noctuoidea
- Family: Noctuidae
- Subfamily: Acontiinae
- Genus: Tesomonoda; Nye, 1975
- Species: T. endolopha

Binomial name
- Tesomonoda endolopha (Hampson, 1910)

Synonyms
- Generic: Odontosema Warren, 1913; Specific: Ligidia endolopha Hampson, 1910

Genus of moths

Tesomonoda is a monotypic moth genus of the family Noctuidae described by Nye in 1975. Its only species, Tesomonoda endolopha, was first described by George Hampson in 1910. It is found in New Guinea.
