= Tegteza =

Scientific classification
- Kingdom: Animalia
- Phylum: Arthropoda
- Class: Insecta
- Order: Lepidoptera
- Superfamily: Noctuoidea
- Family: Erebidae
- Subfamily: Calpinae
- Genus: Tegteza; Walker, 1869
- Species: T. palpalis

Binomial name
- Tegteza palpalis Walker, 1869

Genus of moths

Tegteza is a monotypic moth genus of the family Erebidae. Its only species, Tegteza palpalis, is found in Colombia. Both the genus and species were first described by Francis Walker in 1869.
