= Trichobathra =

Scientific classification
- Kingdom: Animalia
- Phylum: Arthropoda
- Class: Insecta
- Order: Lepidoptera
- Superfamily: Noctuoidea
- Family: Erebidae
- Subfamily: Calpinae
- Genus: Trichobathra; Hampson, 1926
- Species: T. triplogramma

Binomial name
- Trichobathra triplogramma Hampson, 1926

Genus of moths

Trichobathra is a monotypic moth genus of the family Erebidae. Its only species, Trichobathra triplogramma, is found in Ghana and Nigeria. Both the genus and species were first described by George Hampson in 1926.
