= Taviodes =

Scientific classification
- Kingdom: Animalia
- Phylum: Arthropoda
- Class: Insecta
- Order: Lepidoptera
- Superfamily: Noctuoidea
- Family: Erebidae
- Subfamily: Calpinae
- Genus: Taviodes; Hampson, 1926

Genus of moths

Taviodes is a genus of moths of the family Erebidae. The genus was erected by George Hampson in 1926.

== Species ==
- Taviodes congenita Hampson, 1926 southern Nigeria
- Taviodes discomma Hampson, 1926 Ghana, Nigeria
- Taviodes excisa Hampson, 1926 southern Nigeria
- Taviodes fulvescens Hampson, 1926 north-eastern Himalayas, Thailand, Peninsular Malaysia, Sumatra, Borneo
- Taviodes hollowayi Kobes, 2005 Sumatra
- Taviodes javanica Roepke, 1954 western Java
- Taviodes subjecta (Walker, 1865) Zaire, Kenya, Mozambique, Zambia, Swaziland, Zimbabwe, South Africa
- Taviodes tamsi Gaede, 1939 Ghana
- Taviodes virgata Griveaud & Viette, 1962 Madagascar
