= Tineocephala =

Scientific classification
- Kingdom: Animalia
- Phylum: Arthropoda
- Class: Insecta
- Order: Lepidoptera
- Superfamily: Noctuoidea
- Family: Erebidae
- Subfamily: Herminiinae
- Genus: Tineocephala; Dyar, 1914
- Species: T. judis

Binomial name
- Tineocephala judis Dyar, 1914

Genus of moths

Tineocephala is a monotypic moth genus of the family Erebidae. Its only species, Tineocephala judis, is found in Panama. Both the genus and species were first described by Harrison Gray Dyar Jr. in 1914.
