= Tephrialia =

Scientific classification
- Kingdom: Animalia
- Phylum: Arthropoda
- Class: Insecta
- Order: Lepidoptera
- Superfamily: Noctuoidea
- Family: Erebidae
- Subfamily: Calpinae
- Genus: Tephrialia; Hampson, 1926

Genus of moths

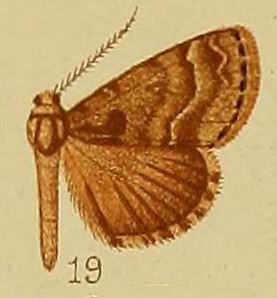
Tephrialia trigonospila

Tephrialia is a genus of moths of the family Erebidae. The genus was erected by George Hampson in 1926.

== Species ==
- Tephrialia glyptalis Mabille
- Tephrialia trigonospila Hampson, 1910
