= Trachodopalpus =

Scientific classification
- Kingdom: Animalia
- Phylum: Arthropoda
- Class: Insecta
- Order: Lepidoptera
- Superfamily: Noctuoidea
- Family: Erebidae
- Subfamily: Herminiinae
- Genus: Trachodopalpus; Blanchard, 1852
- Species: T. cinereus

Binomial name
- Trachodopalpus cinereus Blanchard, 1852

Genus of moths

Trachodopalpus is a monotypic moth genus of the family Erebidae. Its only species, Trachodopalpus cinereus, is found in Chile. Both the genus and the species were first described by Émile Blanchard in 1852.
