= Triommatodes =

Scientific classification
- Domain: Eukaryota
- Kingdom: Animalia
- Phylum: Arthropoda
- Class: Insecta
- Order: Lepidoptera
- Superfamily: Noctuoidea
- Family: Erebidae
- Subfamily: Calpinae
- Genus: Triommatodes; Warren, 1889

Genus of moths

Triommatodes is a genus of moths of the family Noctuidae. The genus was described by Warren in 1889.

The Global Lepidoptera Names Index considers this name to be a synonym of Manbuta Walker, 1865.

== Species ==
- Triommatodes aberrans Schaus, 1914 French Guiana
- Triommatodes adversa Dognin, 1912 Guyana
- Triommatodes aequalipunctata Dognin, 1912 French Guiana
- Triommatodes agenor Schaus, 1914 Guyana
- Triommatodes angulata Schaus, 1906 French Guiana
- Triommatodes belus Schaus, 1914 French Guiana
- Triommatodes canidia Schaus, 1914 French Guiana
- Triommatodes castigata Dognin, 1912 Peru
- Triommatodes costinotata Dognin, 1912 French Guiana
- Triommatodes madrina Schaus, 1901 Mexico
- Triommatodes mapiriensis Dognin, 1912 Bolivia
- Triommatodes padrina Schaus, 1901 Brazil (São Paulo)
- Triommatodes plumosa Warren, 1889 Brazil (Amazonas)
- Triommatodes pygmalion Schaus, 1914 French Guiana
- Triommatodes pylades Schaus, 1914 Guyana
- Triommatodes subrita Schaus, 1901 Brazil (São Paulo)
