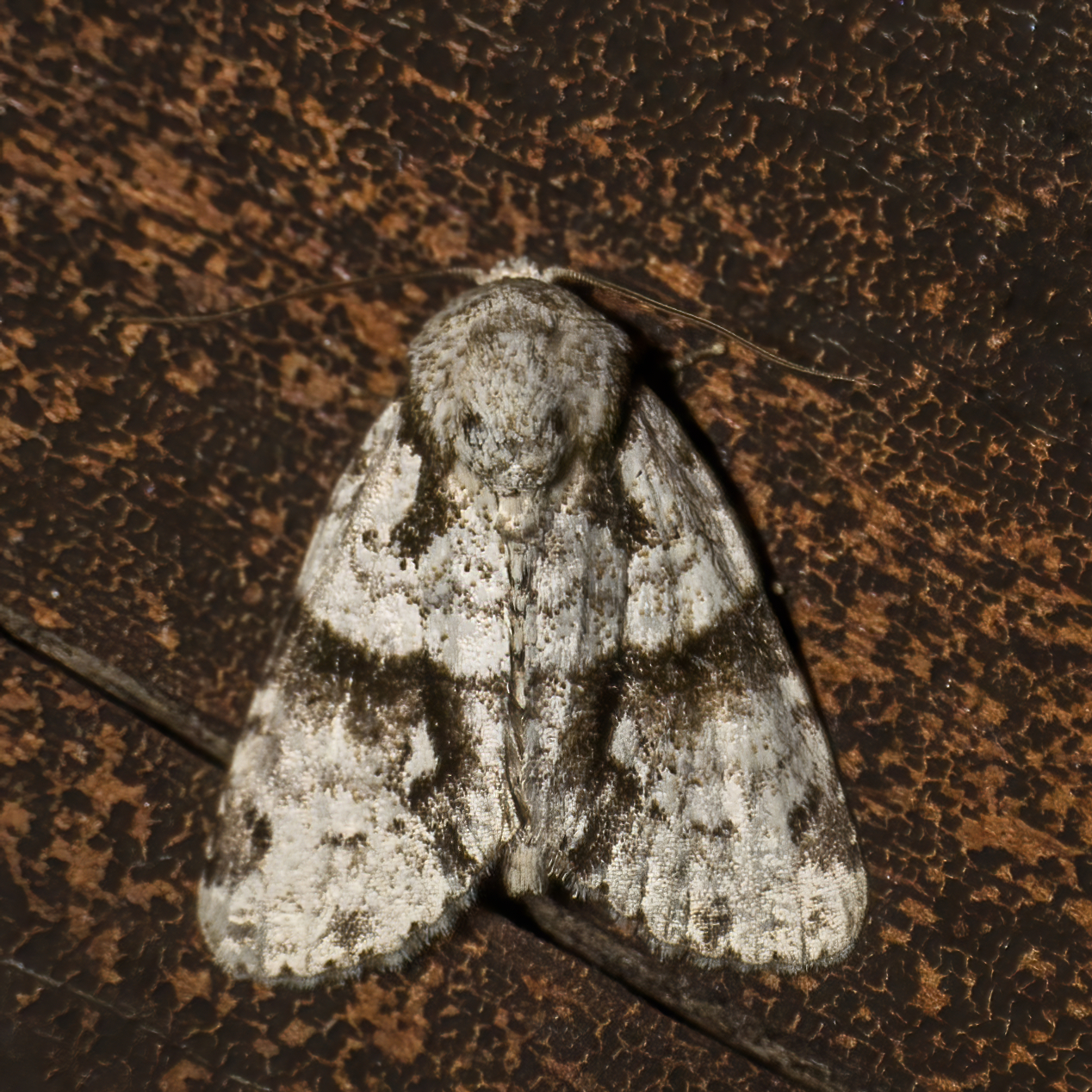
- T. conjecturalis, Sri Lanka

Scientific classification
- Kingdom: Animalia
- Phylum: Arthropoda
- Clade: Pancrustacea
- Class: Insecta
- Order: Lepidoptera
- Superfamily: Noctuoidea
- Family: Noctuidae
- Subfamily: Acronictinae
- Genus: Thalathoides; Holloway, 1989

= Thalathoides =

Genus of moths

Thalathoides is a genus of moths of the family Noctuidae. The genus was erected by Jeremy Daniel Holloway in 1989.

== Species ==
- Thalathoides conjecturalis Swinhoe, 1890
- Thalathoides curtalis Holloway, 1989
