= Tisagronia =

Scientific classification
- Kingdom: Animalia
- Phylum: Arthropoda
- Class: Insecta
- Order: Lepidoptera
- Superfamily: Noctuoidea
- Family: Noctuidae
- Subfamily: Noctuinae
- Genus: Tisagronia; Köhler, 1967

Genus of moths

Tisagronia is a genus of moths of the family Noctuidae.

== Selected species ==
- Tisagronia pexa (Berg, 1877)
