= Tibracana =

Scientific classification
- Kingdom: Animalia
- Phylum: Arthropoda
- Class: Insecta
- Order: Lepidoptera
- Superfamily: Noctuoidea
- Family: Erebidae
- Subfamily: Herminiinae
- Genus: Tibracana; Walker, [1866]

Genus of moths

Tibracana is a genus of moths of the family Erebidae. The genus was erected by Francis Walker in 1866.

== Species ==
- Tibracana gnoma (Schaus, 1906) Brazil (São Paulo)
- Tibracana xanthialis Walker, [1866] Brazil
