= Thausgea =

Scientific classification
- Kingdom: Animalia
- Phylum: Arthropoda
- Class: Insecta
- Order: Lepidoptera
- Superfamily: Noctuoidea
- Family: Erebidae
- Subfamily: Calpinae
- Genus: Thausgea; Viette, 1966

Genus of moths

Thausgea is a genus of moths of the family Erebidae erected by Pierre Viette in 1966. All the species are found on Madagascar.

== Species ==
- Thausgea bekaka Viette, 1966
- Thausgea lolo Viette, 1966
- Thausgea lucifer Viette, 1966
- Thausgea sogai Viette, 1966
