= Trogogonia =

Scientific classification
- Kingdom: Animalia
- Phylum: Arthropoda
- Class: Insecta
- Order: Lepidoptera
- Superfamily: Noctuoidea
- Family: Erebidae
- Subfamily: Calpinae
- Genus: Trogogonia; Hampson, 1926

Genus of moths

Trogogonia is a genus of moths of the family Erebidae. The genus was erected by George Hampson in 1926.

== Species ==
- Trogogonia abrupta (Walker, 1862) Brazil (Amazonas)
- Trogogonia tenebrosa Barbut & Lalanne-Cassou, 2012 French Guiana
