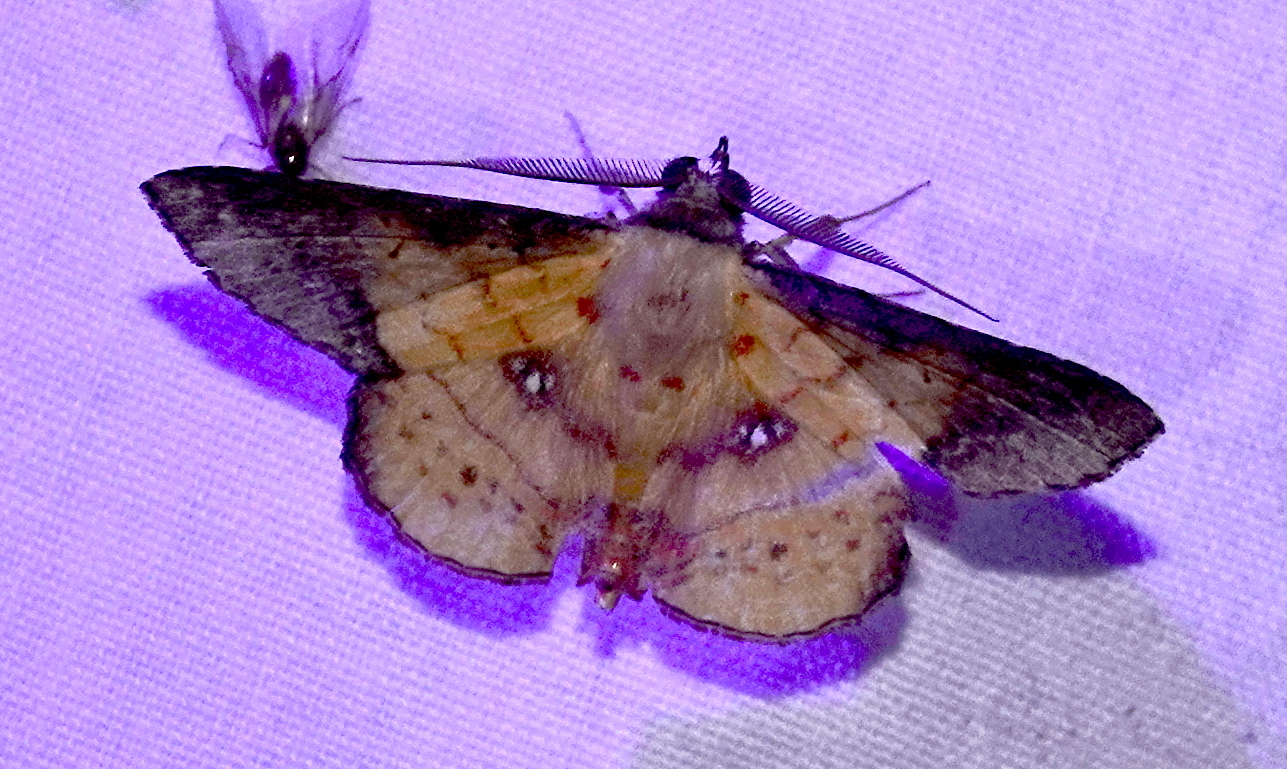
- Cryptochrostis crocea

Scientific classification
- Kingdom: Animalia
- Phylum: Arthropoda
- Clade: Pancrustacea
- Class: Insecta
- Order: Lepidoptera
- Superfamily: Noctuoidea
- Family: Erebidae
- Subfamily: Calpinae
- Genus: Cryptochrostis; Hübner, 1823

Synonyms
- Mandela Walker, [1867]; Thiachroia Schaus, 1921; Thiochroa Hampson, 1926

= Cryptochrostis =

Genus of moths

Cryptochrostis is a genus of moths of the family Erebidae. The genus was erected by Jacob Hübner in 1823.

== Species ==
- Cryptochrostis crocea (Walker, [1867]) Colombia, Costa Rica
- Cryptochrostis duquefi Barbut, 2007 French Guiana
- Cryptochrostis suppulchraria Hübner, [1823] Suriname, Brazil (Rio de Janeiro)
- Cryptochrostis deilinias (Schaus, 1921) Guatemala, Venezuela
- Cryptochrostis flavala (Hampson, 1926) Guyana
