= Tavila =

Scientific classification
- Kingdom: Animalia
- Phylum: Arthropoda
- Class: Insecta
- Order: Lepidoptera
- Superfamily: Noctuoidea
- Family: Noctuidae
- Subfamily: Acontiinae
- Genus: Tavila; Walker, 1869
- Species: T. indeterminata

Binomial name
- Tavila indeterminata Walker, 1869

Genus of moths

Tavila is a monotypic moth genus of the family Noctuidae. Its only species, Tavila indeterminata, is found in Zaire and the Democratic Republic of the Congo. Both the genus and species were first described by Francis Walker in 1869.
