= Tarista =

Scientific classification
- Domain: Eukaryota
- Kingdom: Animalia
- Phylum: Arthropoda
- Class: Insecta
- Order: Lepidoptera
- Superfamily: Noctuoidea
- Family: Erebidae
- Subfamily: Herminiinae
- Genus: Tarista; Schaus, 1913

Genus of moths

Tarista is a genus of moths of the family Erebidae. The genus was described by William Schaus in 1913.

== Species ==
- Tarista albiapicalis Schaus, 1916 Panama, Peru
- Tarista cacalis (Schaus, 1906) Brazil (São Paulo)
- Tarista invida Dognin, 1914 Colombia
- Tarista lycaon (H. Druce, 1891) Mexico, Guatemala
- Tarista lydia (H. Druce, 1891) Guatemala, Costa Rica, Panama
- Tarista morosa Schaus, 1913 Costa Rica
- Tarista nigrirenalis (Guenée, 1854) Brazil (Rio de Janeiro)
- Tarista ricalis (Schaus, 1906) Costa Rica
- Tarista rufipalpis Schaus, 1913 Costa Rica
- Tarista stolalis (Schaus, 1906) Mexico, Costa Rica
