= Toanodes =

Scientific classification
- Domain: Eukaryota
- Kingdom: Animalia
- Phylum: Arthropoda
- Class: Insecta
- Order: Lepidoptera
- Superfamily: Noctuoidea
- Family: Noctuidae
- Subfamily: Acontiinae
- Genus: Toanodes; Warren in Seitz, 1913
- Species: T. rotundipennis

Binomial name
- Toanodes rotundipennis (Hampson, 1910)

Synonyms
- Toana rotundipennis Hampson, 1910

Genus of moths

Toanodes is a monotypic moth genus of the family Noctuidae described by Warren in 1913. Its only species, Toanodes rotundipennis, was first described by George Hampson in 1910. It is found on Woodlark Island in Papua New Guinea.
