= Tosacantha =

Scientific classification
- Domain: Eukaryota
- Kingdom: Animalia
- Phylum: Arthropoda
- Class: Insecta
- Order: Lepidoptera
- Superfamily: Noctuoidea
- Family: Erebidae
- Subfamily: Herminiinae
- Genus: Tosacantha; D. S. Fletcher, 1961
- Species: T. atmocyma

Binomial name
- Tosacantha atmocyma D. S. Fletcher, 1961

Genus of moths

Tosacantha is a monotypic moth genus of the family Erebidae. Its only species, Tosacantha atmocyma, is known from Uganda. Both the genus and the species were first described by David Stephen Fletcher in 1961.
