= Tamsola =

Scientific classification
- Kingdom: Animalia
- Phylum: Arthropoda
- Class: Insecta
- Order: Lepidoptera
- Superfamily: Noctuoidea
- Family: Erebidae
- Subfamily: Hypeninae
- Genus: Tamsola; Wiltshire, 1949
- Species: T. tarda

Binomial name
- Tamsola tarda Wiltshire, 1946

Genus of moths

Tamsola is a monotypic moth genus of the family Erebidae. Its only species, Tamsola tarda, is found in the Kurdistan area of northern Iraq. Both the genus and the species were first described by Edward Parr Wiltshire, the genus in 1949 and the species in 1946.
