= Tornosinus =

Scientific classification
- Domain: Eukaryota
- Kingdom: Animalia
- Phylum: Arthropoda
- Class: Insecta
- Order: Lepidoptera
- Superfamily: Noctuoidea
- Family: Erebidae
- Subfamily: Hypeninae
- Genus: Tornosinus; Bethune-Baker, 1906
- Species: T. niger

Binomial name
- Tornosinus niger Bethune-Baker, 1906

Genus of moths

Tornosinus is a monotypic moth genus of the family Erebidae. Its only species, Tornosinus niger, is known from New Guinea. Both the genus and the species were first described by George Thomas Bethune-Baker in 1906.
