= Thermosara =

Scientific classification
- Kingdom: Animalia
- Phylum: Arthropoda
- Class: Insecta
- Order: Lepidoptera
- Superfamily: Noctuoidea
- Family: Erebidae
- Subfamily: Calpinae
- Genus: Thermosara; Hampson, 1926

Genus of moths

Thermosara is a genus of moths of the family Erebidae. The genus was erected by George Hampson in 1926. Both species are found in New Guinea.

== Species ==
- Thermosara diapyra Hampson, 1926
- Thermosara flavipuncta Hampson, 1926
