= Tipasa (moth) =

Scientific classification
- Domain: Eukaryota
- Kingdom: Animalia
- Phylum: Arthropoda
- Class: Insecta
- Order: Lepidoptera
- Superfamily: Noctuoidea
- Family: Erebidae
- Subfamily: Calpinae
- Genus: Tipasa; Walker, 1863

Genus of moths

Tipasa is a genus of moths of the family Erebidae. The genus was erected by Francis Walker in 1863.

== Species ==
- Tipasa aurata Hampson, 1926 New Guinea
- Tipasa aurea (Bethune-Baker, 1908) New Guinea
- Tipasa boopis Hampson, 1926 New Guinea
- Tipasa eubapta Hampson, 1926 Borneo
- Tipasa ilatana (Holland, 1900) Buru
- Tipasa nebulosella Walker, 1863 Borneo
- Tipasa omariusalis (Walker, 1859) Sri Lanka
- Tipasa renalis (Moore, [1885]) Sri Lanka
- Tipasa subrosea (Pagenstecher, 1900) Bismarck Archipelago
