= Translatix =

Scientific classification
- Kingdom: Animalia
- Phylum: Arthropoda
- Class: Insecta
- Order: Lepidoptera
- Family: Noctuidae
- Genus: Translatix Berio, 1991

Genus of moths

Translatix is a genus of moths of the family Noctuidae. The genus was erected by Emilio Berio in 1991. The type species of the genus is Hypenodes kalchbergi Staudinger, 1876.
