= Tephrinops =

Scientific classification
- Kingdom: Animalia
- Phylum: Arthropoda
- Class: Insecta
- Order: Lepidoptera
- Superfamily: Noctuoidea
- Family: Erebidae
- Subfamily: Calpinae
- Genus: Tephrinops; Hampson, 1926
- Species: T. velutisigna

Binomial name
- Tephrinops velutisigna Hampson, 1926

Genus of moths

Tephrinops is a monotypic moth genus of the family Erebidae. Its only species, Tephrinops velutisigna, is found in the Brazilian state of Espírito Santo. Both the genus and species were first described by George Hampson in 1926.
