= Teinoletis =

Scientific classification
- Kingdom: Animalia
- Phylum: Arthropoda
- Class: Insecta
- Order: Lepidoptera
- Superfamily: Noctuoidea
- Family: Erebidae
- Subfamily: Calpinae
- Genus: Teinoletis; Hampson, 1926
- Species: T. simoenta

Binomial name
- Teinoletis simoenta (Guenée, 1852)

Genus of moths

Teinoletis is a monotypic moth genus of the family Erebidae erected by George Hampson in 1926. Its only species, Teinoletis simoenta, was first described by Achille Guenée in 1852. It is found in Brazil.
