= Talapa =

Scientific classification
- Domain: Eukaryota
- Kingdom: Animalia
- Phylum: Arthropoda
- Class: Insecta
- Order: Lepidoptera
- Superfamily: Noctuoidea
- Family: Erebidae
- Subfamily: Calpinae
- Genus: Talapa; Moore, 1867

Genus of moths

Talapa is a genus of moths of the family Erebidae. The genus was erected by Frederic Moore in 1867.

== Description ==
Palpi obliquely porrect (extending forward), with long second and third joints. Second joint clothed with hair. Antennae minutely ciliated in male. Thorax and abdomen smoothly scaled. Tibia hairy. Forewings with produced and acute apex. Hindwings with vein 5 from lower angle of cell.

== Species ==
- Talapa birthana C. Swinhoe, 1905
- Talapa caliginosa Walker, 1865
