= Thyridospila =

Scientific classification
- Kingdom: Animalia
- Phylum: Arthropoda
- Class: Insecta
- Order: Lepidoptera
- Superfamily: Noctuoidea
- Family: Erebidae
- Subfamily: Calpinae
- Genus: Thyridospila; Guenée in Boisduval & Guenée, 1852

Genus of moths

Thyridospila is a genus of moths of the family Erebidae. The genus was erected by Achille Guenée in 1852.

== Species ==
- Thyridospila caeca Walker, 1866 Brazil
- Thyridospila ennomoides Guenée, 1852 Brazil (Bahia)
- Thyridospila rubricosa Walker, 1865 Brazil (Pará)
- Thyridospila turbulenta Walker, 1858 Brazil (Amazonas)
- Thyridospila ustipennis Walker, 1865 Brazil (Amazonas)
