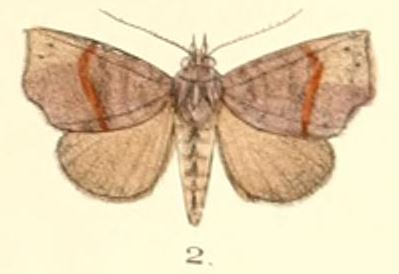
- Thalatta fasciosa

Scientific classification
- Kingdom: Animalia
- Phylum: Arthropoda
- Class: Insecta
- Order: Lepidoptera
- Superfamily: Noctuoidea
- Family: Erebidae
- Subfamily: Calpinae
- Genus: Thalatta; Walker, 1858

= Thalatta =

Genus of moths

Thalatta is a genus of moths of the family Erebidae described by Francis Walker in 1858. The species of this genus are from India, South-east Asia and Sundaland.

== Species ==
Some species of this genus are:

- Thalatta argentimacula Candeze 1927
- Thalatta fasciosa Moore 1882 (India)
- Thalatta melanogramma Hampson 1926
- Thalatta prapata ( Kobes, ) (Peninsular Malaysia)
- Thalatta precedens Walker, 1858 (India)
- Thalatta holortha Hampson (Sundaland)
- Thalatta argentipuncta (Kobes)

According to an article, this, along with many others of the family Noctuidae are highly toxic to canines.
