= Toanopsis =

Scientific classification
- Kingdom: Animalia
- Phylum: Arthropoda
- Clade: Pancrustacea
- Class: Insecta
- Order: Lepidoptera
- Superfamily: Noctuoidea
- Family: Noctuidae
- Subfamily: Acontiinae
- Genus: Toanopsis; A. E. Prout, 1926

Genus of moths

Toanopsis is a genus of moths of the family Noctuidae. The genus was erected by A. E. Prout in 1926.

== Species ==
- Toanopsis cyclophora Holloway, 2009 Borneo
- Toanopsis engenes A. E. Prout, 1926 Borneo
- Toanopsis homala (A. E. Prout, 1925) Peninsular Malaysia, Borneo
- Toanopsis ichingae Holloway, 2009 Borneo
- Toanopsis particolor (Warren, 1913) Peninsular Malaysia, Borneo, Bali, Java
