= Trichopalpina =

Scientific classification
- Kingdom: Animalia
- Phylum: Arthropoda
- Class: Insecta
- Order: Lepidoptera
- Superfamily: Noctuoidea
- Family: Erebidae
- Subfamily: Calpinae
- Genus: Trichopalpina; Hampson, 1926

Genus of moths

Trichopalpina is a genus of moths of the family Erebidae. The genus was erected by George Hampson in 1926.

== Species ==
- Trichopalpina nimba Fletcher & Viette, 1955 Guinea
- Trichopalpina simplex Berio, 1956 Cameroon, Zaire
- Trichopalpina zethesia Hampson, 1926 Nigeria, Cameroon, Gambia, Zaire, Malawi, Zimbabwe
