= Trilophonota =

Scientific classification
- Kingdom: Animalia
- Phylum: Arthropoda
- Class: Insecta
- Order: Lepidoptera
- Superfamily: Noctuoidea
- Family: Erebidae
- Subfamily: Hypeninae
- Genus: Trilophonota; Hampson, 1898
- Species: T. caerulilineata

Binomial name
- Trilophonota caerulilineata Hampson, 1898

Genus of moths

Trilophonota is a monotypic moth genus of the family Erebidae. Its only species, Trilophonota caerulilineata, is found in the Indian state of Meghalaya. Both the genus and the species were first described by George Hampson in 1898.
