= Tripseuxoa =

Scientific classification
- Domain: Eukaryota
- Kingdom: Animalia
- Phylum: Arthropoda
- Class: Insecta
- Order: Lepidoptera
- Superfamily: Noctuoidea
- Family: Noctuidae
- Subfamily: Noctuinae
- Genus: Tripseuxoa

Genus of moths

Tripseuxoa is a genus of moths of the family Noctuidae.

== Selected species ==
- Tripseuxoa deeringi Schaus, 1929
- Tripseuxoa strigata Hampson, 1903
