= Tracheoides =

Scientific classification
- Kingdom: Animalia
- Phylum: Arthropoda
- Clade: Pancrustacea
- Class: Insecta
- Order: Lepidoptera
- Superfamily: Noctuoidea
- Family: Noctuidae
- Genus: Tracheoides; Prout, 1926

Genus of moths

Tracheoides is a genus of moths of the family Noctuidae.

== Species ==
- Tracheoides modesta Prout, 1932
- Tracheoides tamsi Prout, 1926
