= Tatorinia =

Scientific classification
- Domain: Eukaryota
- Kingdom: Animalia
- Phylum: Arthropoda
- Class: Insecta
- Order: Lepidoptera
- Superfamily: Noctuoidea
- Family: Erebidae
- Subfamily: Calpinae
- Genus: Tatorinia; Butler, 1875

Genus of moths

Tatorinia is a genus of moths of the family Erebidae. The genus was erected by Arthur Gardiner Butler in 1875.

== Species ==
- Tatorinia bilinea (Holland, 1894) Gabon, Cameroon
- Tatorinia fumipennis (Felder & Rogenhofer, 1874) Kenya, Mozambique, South Africa
- Tatorinia pallidipennis Hampson, 1926 Sierra Leone, southern Nigeria, Cameroon, Zaire, Uganda, Tanzania
- Tatorinia rufipennis Hampson, 1926 southern Nigeria
