= Tathodelta =

Scientific classification
- Kingdom: Animalia
- Phylum: Arthropoda
- Class: Insecta
- Order: Lepidoptera
- Superfamily: Noctuoidea
- Family: Erebidae
- Subfamily: Calpinae
- Genus: Tathodelta; Hampson, 1893

Genus of moths

Tathodelta is a genus of moths of the family Erebidae. The genus was erected by George Hampson in 1893.

== Species ==
- Tathodelta aroensis Bethune-Baker, 1906 New Guinea
- Tathodelta furvitincta Hampson, 1926 southern Nigeria
- Tathodelta niveigutta Strand, 1920 Taiwan
- Tathodelta purpurascens Hampson, 1893 India, Sri Lanka, Bali, Borneo
- Tathodelta undilinea Hampson, 1926 Madagascar
