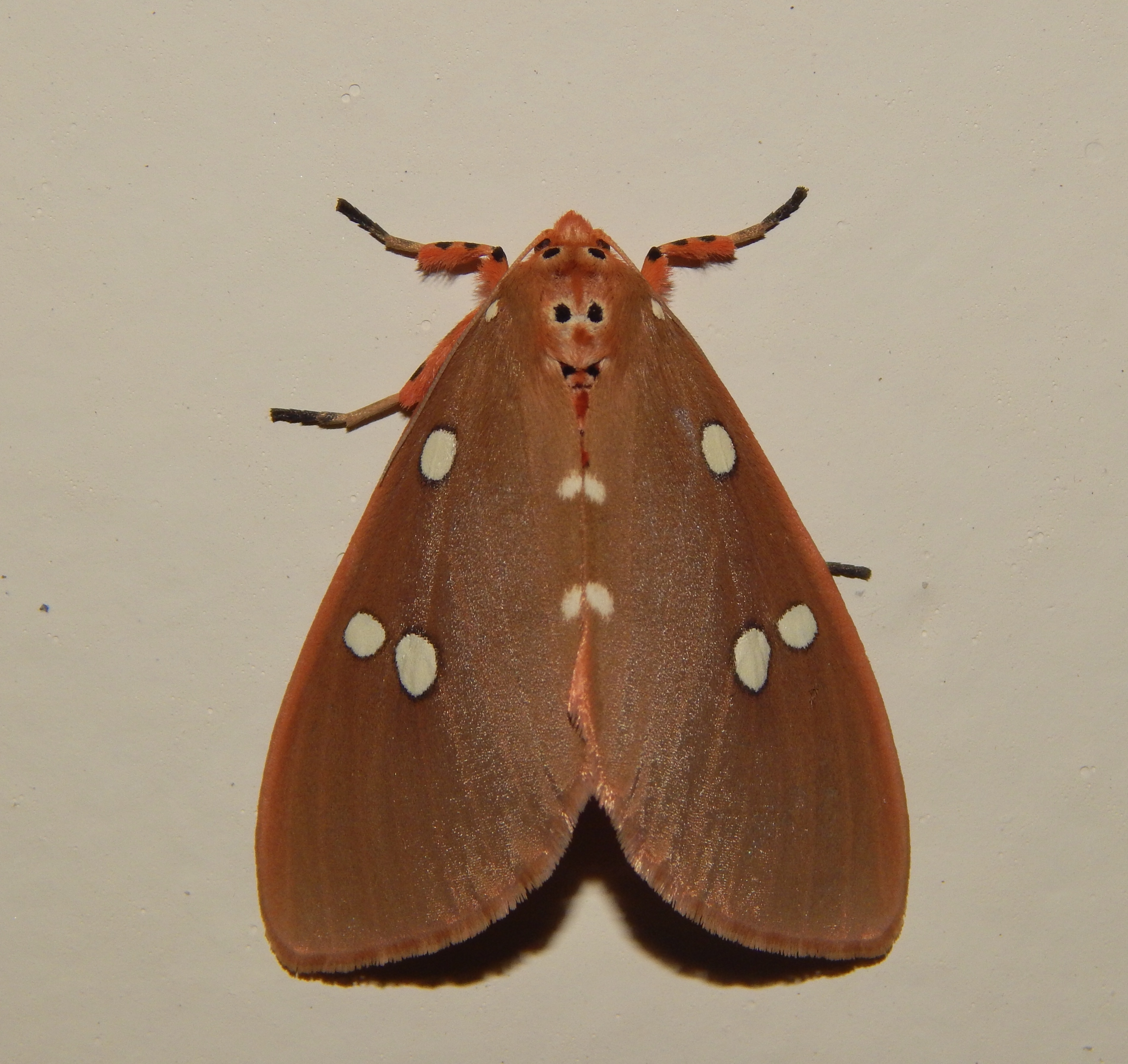

Scientific classification
- Kingdom: Animalia
- Phylum: Arthropoda
- Class: Insecta
- Order: Lepidoptera
- Superfamily: Noctuoidea
- Family: Erebidae
- Genus: Tinolius
- Species: T. eburneigutta

Binomial name
- Tinolius eburneigutta Walker, 1855

Synonyms
- Tinoleus [sic] eburneigutta Moore, 1878

= Tinolius eburneigutta =

Species of moth

Tinolius eburneigutta is a moth of the family Erebidae first described by Francis Walker in 1855. It is found in India, Sri Lanka, and Thailand.

== Description ==
The male has strongly bipectinate (comb-like on both sides) antennae. Caterpillars are known to feed on Thunbergia species.

== Larval food plants ==
- Thunbergia alata - Sri Lanka
- Thunbergia grandiflora - Indian subregion
- Thunbergia mysorensis - India
