= Tringilburra =

Scientific classification
- Kingdom: Animalia
- Phylum: Arthropoda
- Class: Insecta
- Order: Lepidoptera
- Superfamily: Noctuoidea
- Family: Noctuidae
- Genus: Tringilburra; Lucas, 1901

Genus of moths

Tringilburra is a genus of moths of the family Noctuidae.

== Species ==
- Tringilburra lugens Lucas, 1901
