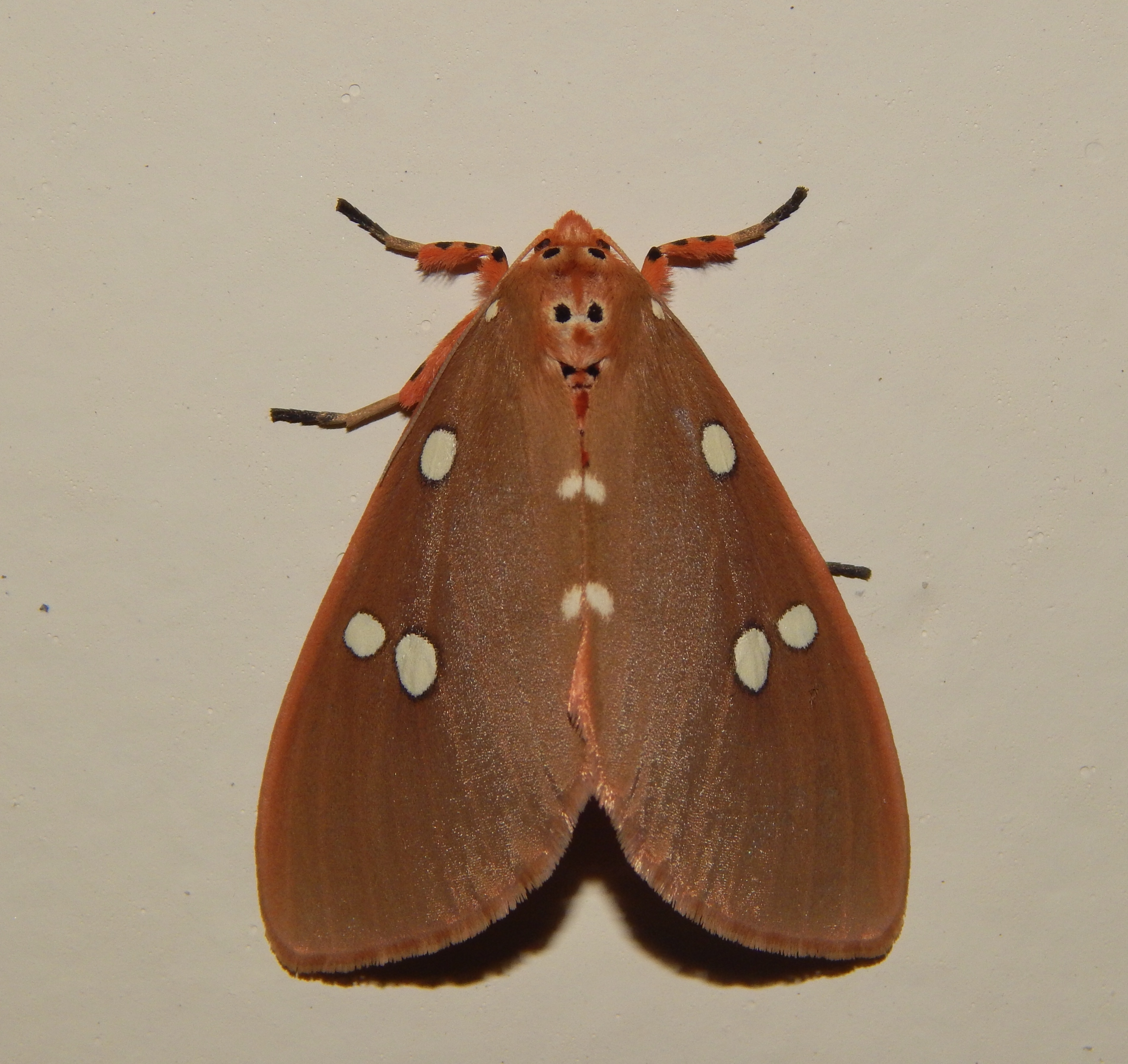
- Tinolius eburneigutta

Scientific classification
- Kingdom: Animalia
- Phylum: Arthropoda
- Class: Insecta
- Order: Lepidoptera
- Superfamily: Noctuoidea
- Family: Erebidae
- Subfamily: Tinoliinae
- Genus: Tinolius; Walker, 1855

= Tinolius =

Genus of moths

Tinolius is a genus of moths in the family Erebidae. The genus was erected by Francis Walker in 1855.

== Description ==
Palpi obliquely porrect (extending forward) and hairy. Antennae bipectinated (comb like on both sides) in male and ciliated in female. Thorax tuftless. Abdomen with dorsal tufts. Forewings with vein 10 runs from beyond the end of areole. Larva with two pairs of abdominal prolegs.

== Species ==
- Tinolius eburneigutta
- Tinolius hypsana
- Tinolius quadrimaculatus
- Tinolius sundensis
