= Thiona =

Scientific classification
- Kingdom: Animalia
- Phylum: Arthropoda
- Class: Insecta
- Order: Lepidoptera
- Superfamily: Noctuoidea
- Family: Erebidae
- Subfamily: Calpinae
- Genus: Thiona; Guenée in Boisduval & Guenée, 1852
- Species: T. phalaena

Binomial name
- Thiona phalaena Guenée, 1852

Genus of moths

Thiona is a monotypic moth genus of the family Erebidae. Its only species, Thiona phalaena, is found in Brazil. Both the genus and species were first described by Achille Guenée in 1852.
