= Taenerema =

Scientific classification
- Domain: Eukaryota
- Kingdom: Animalia
- Phylum: Arthropoda
- Class: Insecta
- Order: Lepidoptera
- Superfamily: Noctuoidea
- Family: Noctuidae
- Genus: Taenerema; Draudt, 1950

Genus of moths

Taenerema is a genus of moths of the family Noctuidae.

== Species ==
- Taenerema hoenei Draudt, 1950
