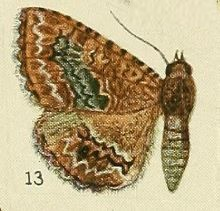
- Taveta syrnix

Scientific classification
- Kingdom: Animalia
- Phylum: Arthropoda
- Class: Insecta
- Order: Lepidoptera
- Superfamily: Noctuoidea
- Family: Erebidae
- Subfamily: Calpinae
- Genus: Taveta; Fawcett, 1916

= Taveta (moth) =

Genus of moths

Taveta is a genus of moths in the family Erebidae. The genus was established by J. Malcolm Fawcett in 1916.

== Species ==
- Taveta eucosmia Hampson, 1926 (Kenya, Madagascar, Malawi)
- Taveta syrnix Fawcett, 1916 (East Africa)
