= Tamsia =

Scientific classification
- Domain: Eukaryota
- Kingdom: Animalia
- Phylum: Arthropoda
- Class: Insecta
- Order: Lepidoptera
- Superfamily: Noctuoidea
- Family: Erebidae
- Genus: Tamsia; Roepke, 1938
- Species: T. hieroglyphica

Binomial name
- Tamsia hieroglyphica (Swinhoe, 1902)

Synonyms
- Oxaenanus hieroglyphica Swinhoe, 1902; Tamsia elegantula Roepke, 1938

Genus of moths

Tamsia is a monotypic moth genus in the family Erebidae described by Roepke in 1938. Its only species, Tamsia hieroglyphica, was first described by Charles Swinhoe in 1902. It is found on the Indonesian island of Sulawesi.
