= Alice Ellen Prout =

- Born: Alice Ellen Prout; 1871
- Died: 1957 (aged 85–86)
- Occupation: Entomologist
- Known for: Research on moths
- Parent: Ebenezer Prout
- Relatives: Louis Beethoven Prout (brother)

Alice Ellen Prout (1871–1957) was an English entomologist specialised in moths.

She was the sister of fellow entomologist Louis Beethoven Prout. Their father was the composer and musicologist Ebenezer Prout.

Prout published primarily on the owlet moths (Noctuidae), which at the time were treated as a family and are now included within the superfamily Noctuoidea. She also prepared scientific illustrations of type specimens for Die Gross-Schmetterlinge der Erde, the large multi-volume work edited by Adalbert Seitz.

== Taxa named by Alice Ellen Prout ==
- Ableptina
- Aulocheta
- Anepholcia
- Anepholcia talboti
- Anisoneura hypocyana buruensis
- Aedia thomae (1927)
- Adrapsa occidens
- Achaea usitata
- Achaea tornistigma
- Achaea renata
- Asota diastropha
- Ableptina delospila
- Catephia dentiscripta (1921)
- Catocala jansseni
- Catocala thomsoni
- Ctenypena
- Checupa curvivena
- Checupa equifortis
- Disepholcia
- Hypena albirhomboidea
- Leptamma flexuosa
- Platyja lecerfi
- Phaegorista bisignibasis
- Phaegorista trialbata
- Nyodes thomae
- Achaea ochrocraspeda
- Catephia xylois
- Aedia thomae
- Aedia lobata
- Catephia dentiscripta
- Rhesala keiensis
- Deltote picatina
- Nagia dentiscripta
- Rhesalides
- Risoba calainodes
- Risoba diphtheropsis
- Risoba sticticata
- Subsimplicia
- Smilepholcia
- Toanopsis
