= Trichosea androdes =

Scientific classification
- Kingdom: Animalia
- Phylum: Arthropoda
- Clade: Pancrustacea
- Class: Insecta
- Order: Lepidoptera
- Superfamily: Noctuoidea
- Family: Noctuidae
- Genus: Trichosea
- Species: T. androdes

Binomial name
- Trichosea androdes Prout, 1924

Species of moth

Trichosea androdes is a moth of the family Noctuidae. It is endemic to Sumatra and Peninsular Malaysia.
