= Trichosea nigricatena =

Scientific classification
- Kingdom: Animalia
- Phylum: Arthropoda
- Clade: Pancrustacea
- Class: Insecta
- Order: Lepidoptera
- Superfamily: Noctuoidea
- Family: Noctuidae
- Genus: Trichosea
- Species: T. nigricatena

Binomial name
- Trichosea nigricatena (Prout, 1922)

Synonyms
- Dipthera nigricatena Prout, 1922

Species of moth

Trichosea nigricatena is a moth of the family Noctuidae. It is endemic to Ceram and Sulawesi.
