= Trichosea ainu =

Scientific classification
- Domain: Eukaryota
- Kingdom: Animalia
- Phylum: Arthropoda
- Class: Insecta
- Order: Lepidoptera
- Superfamily: Noctuoidea
- Family: Noctuidae
- Genus: Trichosea
- Species: T. ainu

Binomial name
- Trichosea ainu (Wileman, 1911)

Synonyms
- Moma champa var. ainu Wileman, 1911

Species of moth

Trichosea ainu is a moth of the family Noctuidae. It is endemic to Japan.

The wingspan is about 40 mm.
