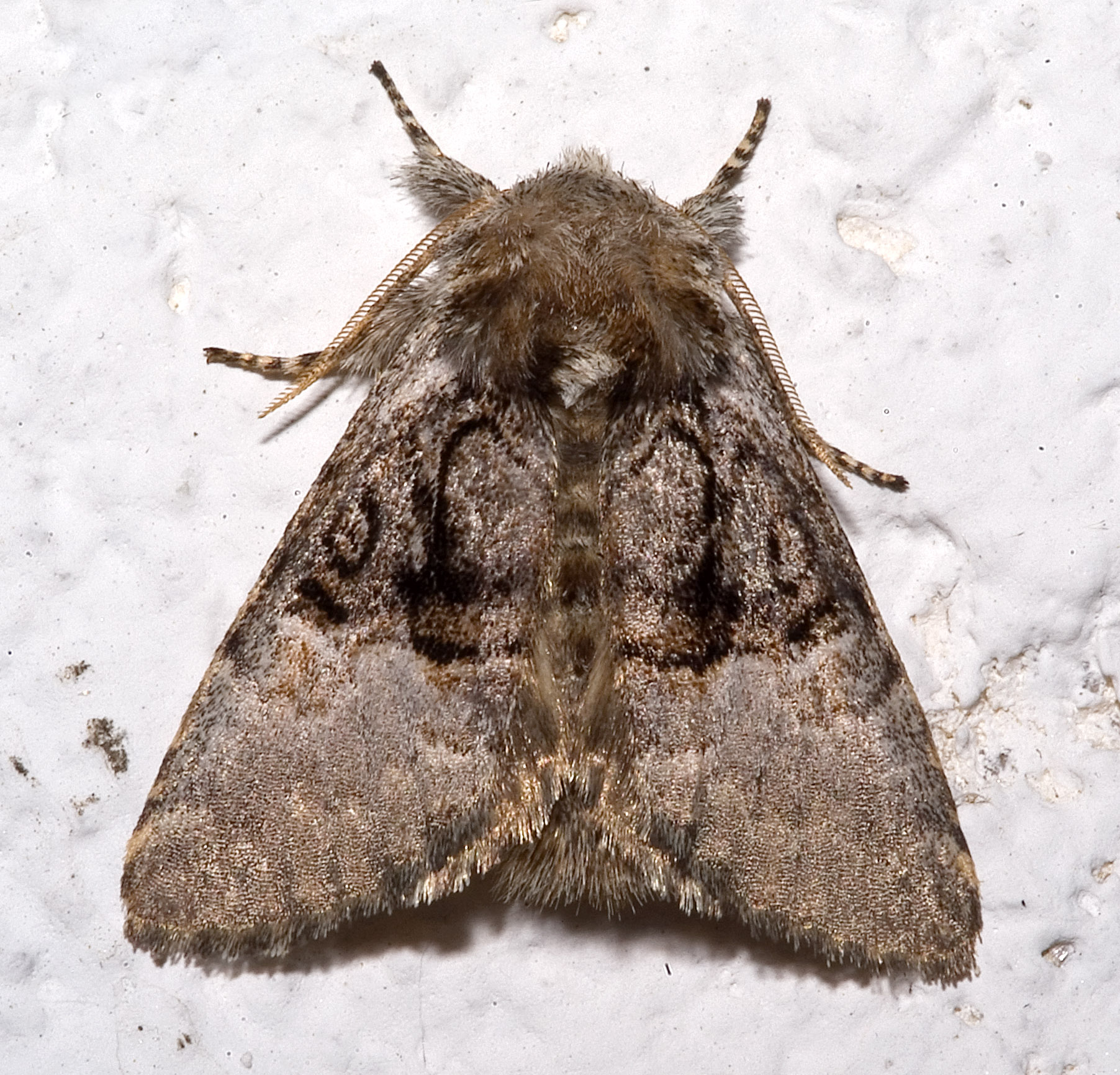
- Colocasia coryli, light individual

Scientific classification
- Kingdom: Animalia
- Phylum: Arthropoda
- Clade: Pancrustacea
- Class: Insecta
- Order: Lepidoptera
- Superfamily: Noctuoidea
- Family: Noctuidae
- Subfamily: Pantheinae

Genera
- See text

= Pantheinae =

Subfamily of moths

Pantheinae is a small subfamily of moth family Noctuidae. It used to be considered a family, under the name Pantheidae.

== Genera ==
- Anacronicta
- Anepholcia
- Bathyra
- Brandtina
- Charadra
- Colocasia
- Disepholcia
- Elydnodes
- Gaujonia
- Lafontaineana
- Lichnoptera
- Meleneta
- Moma
- Panthauma
- Panthea
- Pantheaforma
- Pseudopanthea
- Smilepholcia
- Tambana
- Trichosea
- Trisulipsa
- Trisuloides
- Xanthomantis
