= Trichosea leucotaenia =

Scientific classification
- Kingdom: Animalia
- Phylum: Arthropoda
- Clade: Pancrustacea
- Class: Insecta
- Order: Lepidoptera
- Superfamily: Noctuoidea
- Family: Noctuidae
- Genus: Trichosea
- Species: T. leucotaenia

Binomial name
- Trichosea leucotaenia (Prout, 1924)

Synonyms
- Dipthera leucotaenia Prout, 1924

Species of moth

Trichosea leucotaenia is a moth of the family Noctuidae. It is endemic to Buru, Indonesia.
