= Trichosea mjobergi =

Scientific classification
- Kingdom: Animalia
- Phylum: Arthropoda
- Clade: Pancrustacea
- Class: Insecta
- Order: Lepidoptera
- Superfamily: Noctuoidea
- Family: Noctuidae
- Genus: Trichosea
- Species: T. mjobergi

Binomial name
- Trichosea mjobergi (Prout, 1926)

Synonyms
- Diphthera mjobergi Prout, 1926

Species of moth

Trichosea mjobergi is a moth of the family Noctuidae. It is endemic to Borneo.
