= Phaegorista prouti =

Scientific classification
- Kingdom: Animalia
- Phylum: Arthropoda
- Clade: Pancrustacea
- Class: Insecta
- Order: Lepidoptera
- Superfamily: Noctuoidea
- Family: Erebidae
- Genus: Phaegorista
- Species: P. prouti

Binomial name
- Phaegorista prouti Joicey & Talbot, 1921

Species of moth

Phaegorista prouti is a species of fruit-piercing moth in the family Erebidae. It is found in Africa, including the Democratic Republic of the Congo.
