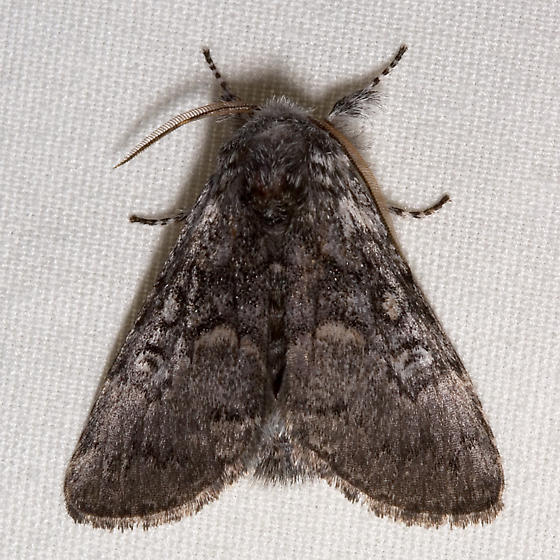

Scientific classification
- Kingdom: Animalia
- Phylum: Arthropoda
- Clade: Pancrustacea
- Class: Insecta
- Order: Lepidoptera
- Superfamily: Noctuoidea
- Family: Noctuidae
- Genus: Colocasia
- Species: C. propinquilinea

Binomial name
- Colocasia propinquilinea (Grote, 1873)

= Colocasia propinquilinea =

Closebanded yellowhorn

Species of moth

Colocasia propinquilinea, the closebanded yellowhorn, is a moth of the family Noctuidae. The species was first described by Augustus Radcliffe Grote in 1873. It is found in North America from Newfoundland and Labrador, west across the southern edge of the boreal forest to central Alberta, south to North Carolina, Missouri and Arkansas.

The wingspan is 35–45 mm. Adults are on wing from April to July in the south and from May to August in the north. There is one generation per year in the north and two or more in the south.
