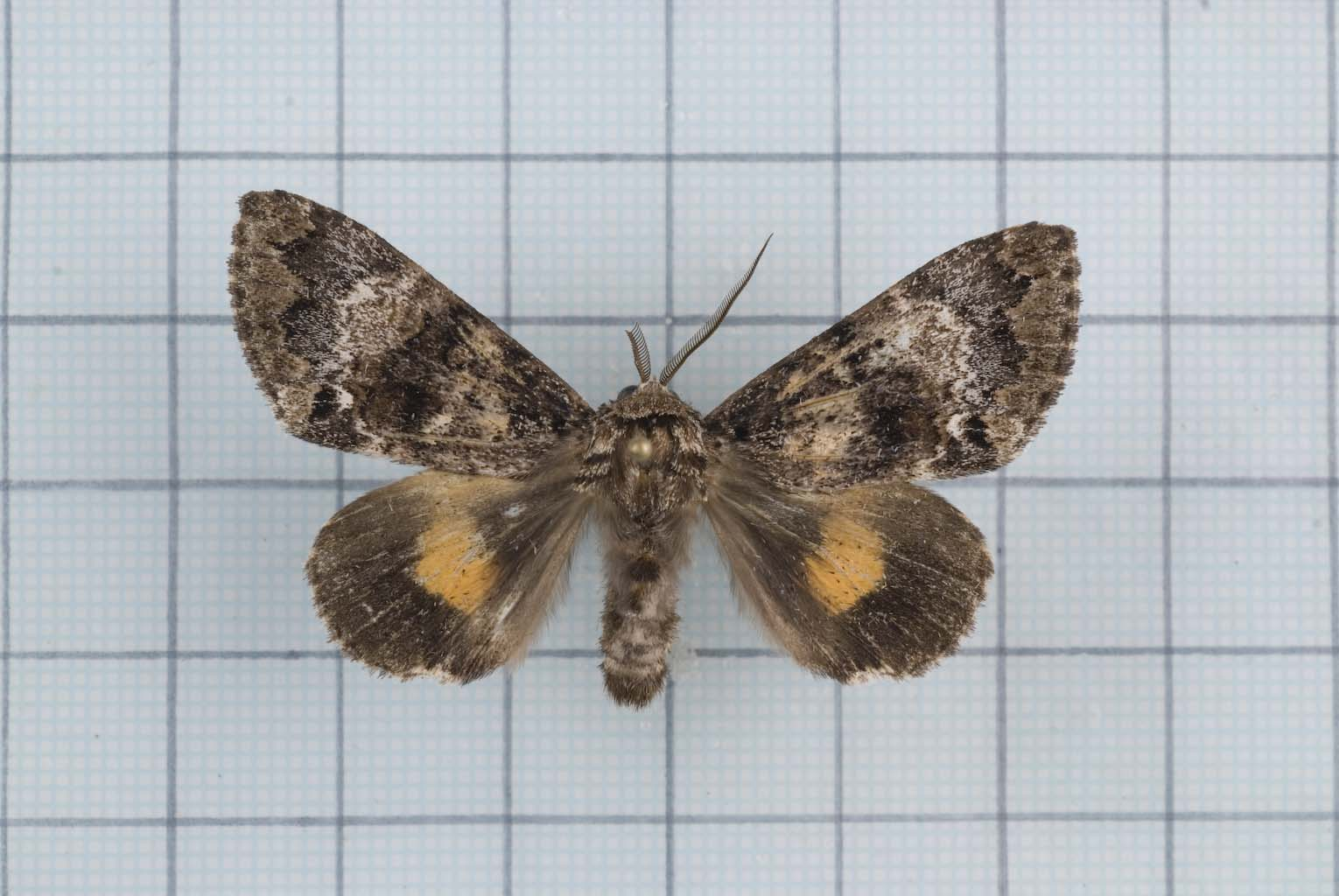

Scientific classification
- Domain: Eukaryota
- Kingdom: Animalia
- Phylum: Arthropoda
- Class: Insecta
- Order: Lepidoptera
- Superfamily: Noctuoidea
- Family: Noctuidae
- Genus: Trisuloides
- Species: T. sericea

Binomial name
- Trisuloides sericea Butler, 1881

= Trisuloides sericea =

Species of moth

Trisuloides sericea is a moth of the family Noctuidae. It is found in South-east Asia.

The wingspan is about 24 mm.

== Subspecies ==
- Trisuloides sericea sericea (India)
- Trisuloides sericea hawkeri A.E. Prout & Talbot, 1924 (Indonesia: Central Buru)
- Trisuloides sericea trigonoleuca A.E. Prout, 1922 (Indonesia, Central Sulawesi)
