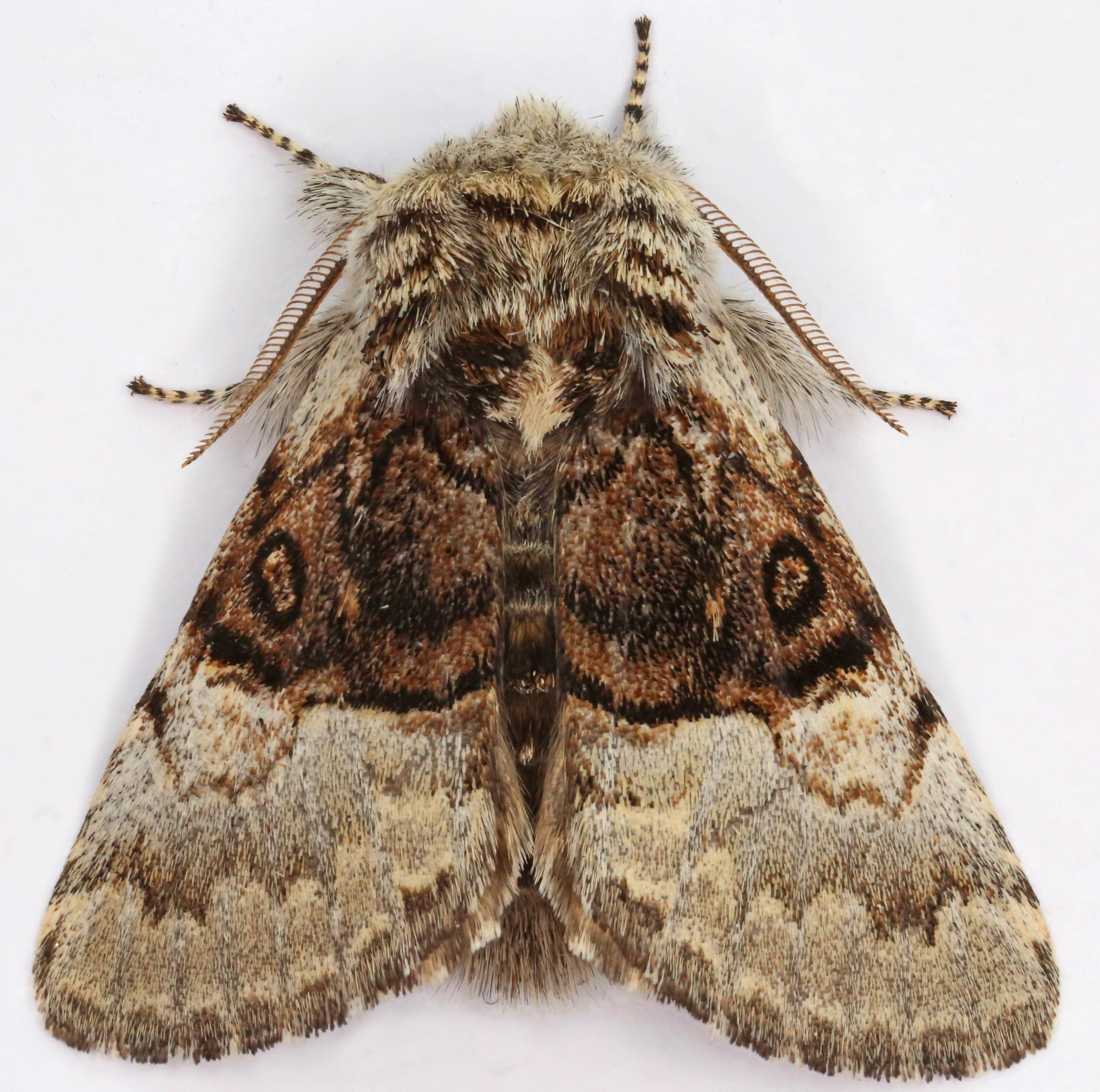
- Colocasia coryli

Scientific classification
- Kingdom: Animalia
- Phylum: Arthropoda
- Class: Insecta
- Order: Lepidoptera
- Superfamily: Noctuoidea
- Family: Noctuidae
- Subfamily: Pantheinae
- Genus: Colocasia; Ochsenheimer, 1816

= Colocasia (moth) =

Genus of moths

Colocasia is a genus of moths of the family Noctuidae erected by the German actor and entomologist Ferdinand Ochsenheimer.

== Species ==
- Colocasia coryli (Linnaeus, 1758)
- Colocasia flavicornis (J. B. Smith, 1884)
- Colocasia propinquilinea (Grote, 1873)
