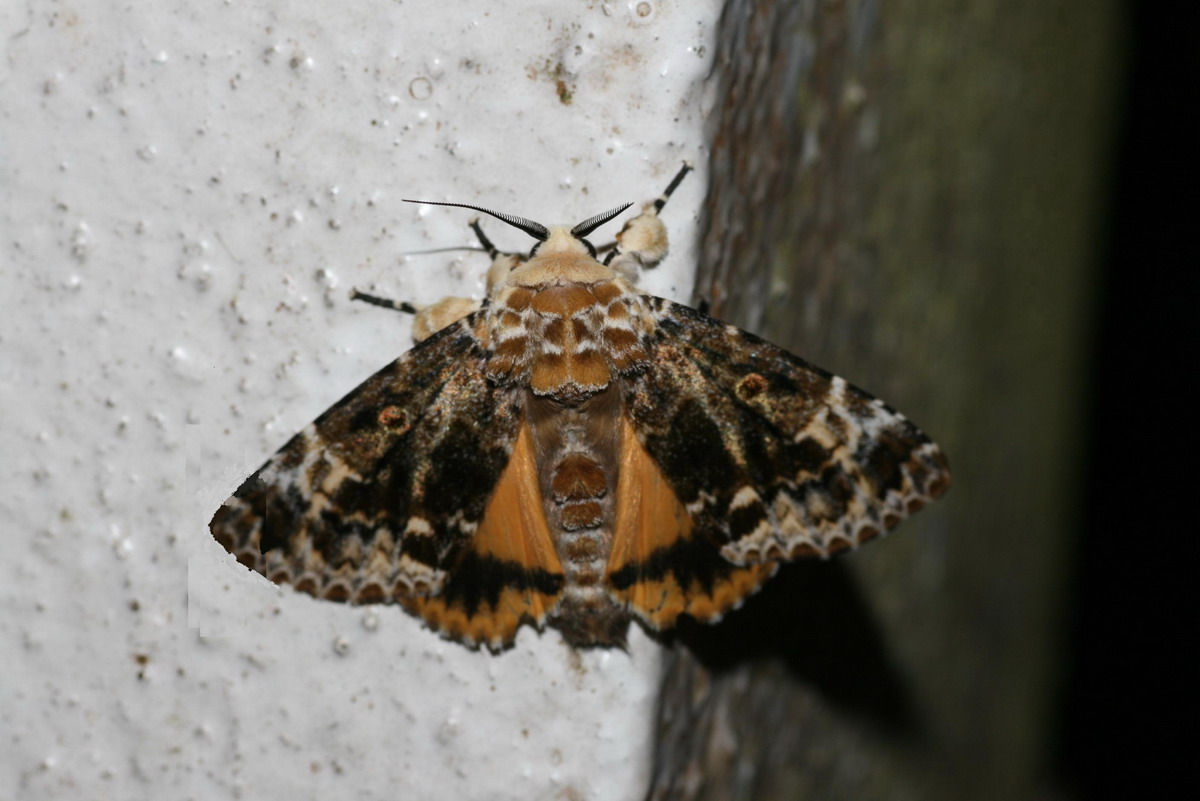

Scientific classification
- Kingdom: Animalia
- Phylum: Arthropoda
- Clade: Pancrustacea
- Class: Insecta
- Order: Lepidoptera
- Superfamily: Noctuoidea
- Family: Noctuidae
- Subfamily: Pantheinae
- Genus: Anepholcia; Prout, 1924

= Anepholcia =

Genus of moths

Anepholcia is a genus of moths of the family Noctuidae.

== Species ==
- Anepholcia pygaria Warren, 1912
- Anepholcia talboti Prout, 1924
- Anepholcia brechlini Behounek and Kononenko, 2011
- Anepholcia kobesi Behounek and Kononenko, 2011
- Anepholcia philippina Behounek and Kononenko, 2011
