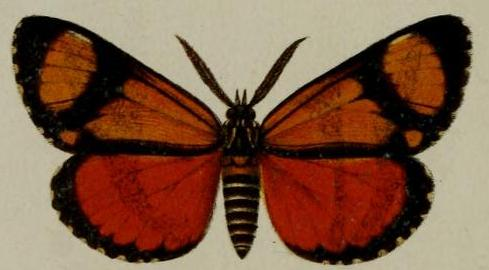

Scientific classification
- Kingdom: Animalia
- Phylum: Arthropoda
- Clade: Pancrustacea
- Class: Insecta
- Order: Lepidoptera
- Superfamily: Noctuoidea
- Family: Erebidae
- Genus: Phaegorista
- Species: P. zebra

Binomial name
- Phaegorista zebra Butler, 1897

= Phaegorista zebra =

Species of moth

Phaegorista zebra is a moth in the family Erebidae. It is found in Malawi.
