= Leptamma =

Scientific classification
- Kingdom: Animalia
- Phylum: Arthropoda
- Clade: Pancrustacea
- Class: Insecta
- Order: Lepidoptera
- Superfamily: Noctuoidea
- Family: Erebidae
- Subfamily: Calpinae
- Genus: Leptamma; Gaede in Seitz, 1939
- Species: L. flexuosa

Binomial name
- Leptamma flexuosa (A. E. Prout, 1927)

Synonyms
- Achaea flexuosa A. E. Prout, 1927; Leptamma flavalis Gaede, 1939

Genus of moths

Leptamma is a monotypic moth genus of the family Erebidae erected by Max Gaede in 1939. Its only species, Leptamma flexuosa, was first described by Alice Ellen Prout in 1927. It is found in Cameroon, Gabon and São Tomé.
