= Phaegorista leucomelas =

Scientific classification
- Kingdom: Animalia
- Phylum: Arthropoda
- Clade: Pancrustacea
- Class: Insecta
- Order: Lepidoptera
- Superfamily: Noctuoidea
- Family: Erebidae
- Genus: Phaegorista
- Species: P. leucomelas

Binomial name
- Phaegorista leucomelas Herrich-Schäffer, 1855

Species of moth

Phaegorista leucomelas is a species of fruit-piercing moth in the family Erebidae. It is found in Africa, including Liberia and Kenya.
