= Phaegorista agaristoides =

Scientific classification
- Kingdom: Animalia
- Phylum: Arthropoda
- Clade: Pancrustacea
- Class: Insecta
- Order: Lepidoptera
- Superfamily: Noctuoidea
- Family: Erebidae
- Genus: Phaegorista
- Species: P. agaristoides

Binomial name
- Phaegorista agaristoides Boisduval, 1836

Species of moth

Phaegorista agaristoides is a species of fruit-piercing moth in the family Erebidae. It is found in western and southeastern Africa.
