= Ctenypena =

Scientific classification
- Kingdom: Animalia
- Phylum: Arthropoda
- Clade: Pancrustacea
- Class: Insecta
- Order: Lepidoptera
- Superfamily: Noctuoidea
- Family: Erebidae
- Subfamily: Hypeninae
- Genus: Ctenypena; A. E. Prout, 1927
- Species: C. tenuis

Binomial name
- Ctenypena tenuis A. E. Prout, 1927

Genus of moths

Ctenypena is a monotypic moth genus of the family Erebidae. Its only species, Ctenypena tenuis, is known from São Tomé off the west coast of Africa. Both the genus and the species were first described by Alice Ellen Prout in 1927.
