= Meleneta antennata =

Scientific classification
- Domain: Eukaryota
- Kingdom: Animalia
- Phylum: Arthropoda
- Class: Insecta
- Order: Lepidoptera
- Superfamily: Noctuoidea
- Family: Noctuidae
- Genus: Meleneta
- Species: M. antennata

Binomial name
- Meleneta antennata Smith, 1908

Species of moth

Meleneta antennata is a species of moth in the family Noctuidae (the owlet moths). It is found in North America.

The MONA or Hodges number for Meleneta antennata is 9191.
