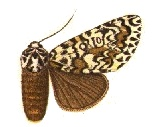

Scientific classification
- Domain: Eukaryota
- Kingdom: Animalia
- Phylum: Arthropoda
- Class: Insecta
- Order: Lepidoptera
- Superfamily: Noctuoidea
- Family: Noctuidae
- Genus: Lichnoptera
- Species: L. moestoides

Binomial name
- Lichnoptera moestoides Dognin, 1912

= Lichnoptera moestoides =

Species of moth

Lichnoptera moestoides is a species of moth of the family Noctuidae. It is found in South America including Peru.
