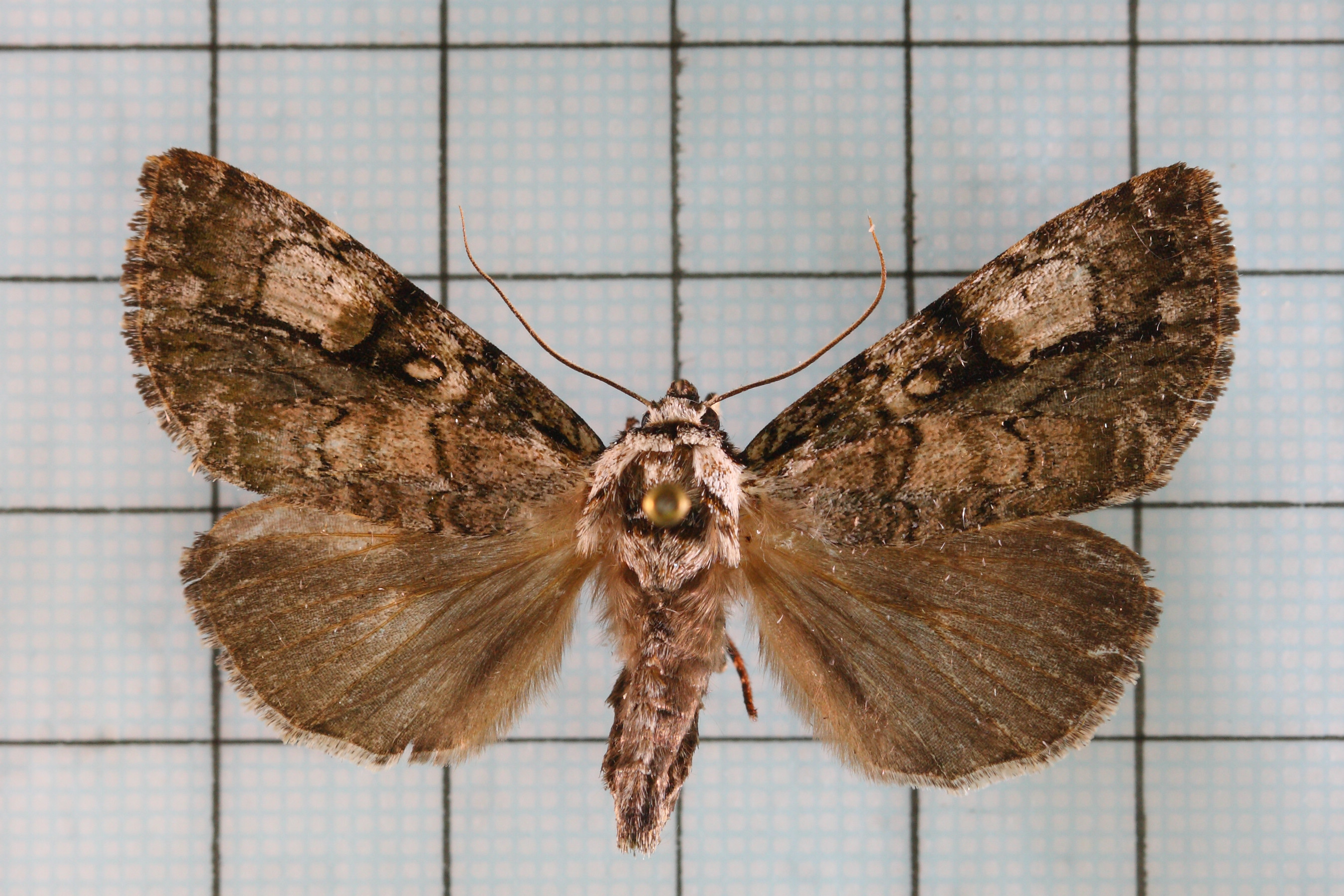

Scientific classification
- Domain: Eukaryota
- Kingdom: Animalia
- Phylum: Arthropoda
- Class: Insecta
- Order: Lepidoptera
- Superfamily: Noctuoidea
- Family: Noctuidae
- Genus: Anacronicta
- Species: A. nitida

Binomial name
- Anacronicta nitida (Butler, 1878)

Synonyms
- Aplectoides nitida Butler, 1878; Anacronicta kurilensis Bryk, 1941; Aplectoides moupinensis Leech, 1900

= Anacronicta nitida =

Species of moth

Anacronicta nitida is a moth of the family Noctuidae. It is found in Taiwan, Japan and the Kuriles.

The wingspan is 48–52 mm.
