= Pseudopanthea =

Scientific classification
- Domain: Eukaryota
- Kingdom: Animalia
- Phylum: Arthropoda
- Class: Insecta
- Order: Lepidoptera
- Superfamily: Noctuoidea
- Family: Noctuidae
- Subfamily: Pantheinae
- Genus: Pseudopanthea; McDunnough, 1942

Genus of moths

Pseudopanthea is a genus of moths of the family Noctuidae.

== Species ==
- Pseudopanthea palata (Grote, 1880)
