= Ebenezer Prout =

English musical theorist, writer, teacher and composer

Ebenezer Prout (1 March 1835 – 5 December 1909) was an English musical theorist, writer, music teacher and composer, whose instruction, afterwards embodied in a series of standard works still used today, underpinned the work of many British classical musicians of succeeding generations.

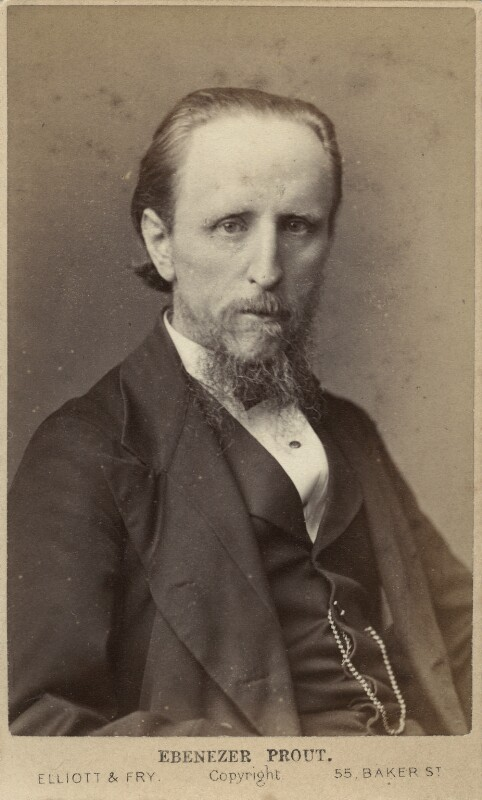
Ebenezer Prout (1835–1909)

== Early career ==
Prout was born in Oundle on 1 March 1835. His father was a clergyman and he was the nephew of the water-colour painter Samuel Prout. His father taught him music and he studied piano under Charles Salaman, but was otherwise self-taught. He attended the University of London intending a career as a scholar, but chose to follow one in music through his love of it.

From 1861 to 1873 he was Organist of the Union Chapel, Islington. From 1861 to 1885 he was Professor of the Piano at the Crystal Palace School of Art. He was awarded first prizes for a string quartet (1862) and a pianoforte quartet (1865) by the Society of British Musicians. Between 1871 and 1874 he was Editor (the first) of the Monthly Musical Record, and between 1874 and 1879 music critic for the Academy. In 1863 he was one of the first twenty-one members of the Royal College of Organists.

From 1876 to 1882 Prout taught on the faculty of the National Training School of Music. In 1879 he was appointed Professor of Harmony and Composition at the Royal Academy of Music in London, and became music critic of the Athenaeum. In 1884 he became a professor at the Guildhall School of Music, London. In 1894 he was appointed Professor of Music at Trinity College Dublin, being awarded an honorary Mus.Doc. the following year. During this period he not only trained his students but delivered memorable public lecture series, notably one on the Bach cantatas illustrated by singers he had trained.

== Theory ==
Also to this period belong his principal theoretical works, many of which became standard text books and were translated into multiple languages. In 1877 he contributed a text on instrumentation to Novello's series of music primers. Then came a series of treatises, including Harmony, its Theory and Practice (1889), which reached a twenty-fourth edition, Counterpoint, Strict and Free (1890), which ran to nine editions, Fugue (1891), and The Orchestra (1898-9, two volumes).

Prout produced editions of many of the classics, not least the Handel oratorios. He was directly connected with the rediscovery of the original wind parts for Messiah, from which new full and vocal scores were introduced by him to the Royal Society of Musicians in 1902. As an editor, Prout reflected the practices of his own time in that he felt justified in replacing Handel's phrasing and expression marks with his own preferences. In this respect Prout differed from his contemporary Friedrich Chrysander, who was the first to produce an edition attempting to convey the composer's own intentions.

Prout is also remembered for fitting whimsical words to the main subjects of J. S. Bach's fugues, and in particular all of the fugues from Bach's 48 Preludes and Fugues.

== Composition ==
For a period, Prout was regarded as one of the most promising English composers. He produced four symphonies between 1867 and 1886, and a series of dramatic cantatas, commissions from the Birmingham, Norwich and Bristol Festivals. Other choral works were written for his local choir, the Hackney Choral Association, and given under the composer's direction at prominent venues in London. Among several performances at the Crystal Palace, London, the Organ Concerto in E minor was performed by John Stainer in 1871. He also composed orchestral overtures, chamber music (including two string quartets and two piano quartets) and instrumental sonatas, such as the Clarinet Sonata in D (1882). The Concertante Duet in A major for piano and harmonium, written in 1872 and published by Augener in 1900, achieved particular popularity.

His music generally secured good reviews:

"The Symphony [No.2] in G minor is, as regards construction and style, built on the noblest lines of the great masters, and, if for this reason alone, presents a claim to our regard. If on account of its Finale alone, the Symphony deserves a cordial welcome and ungrudged honour. To sum up, we have in this work a capital specimen of finished and classical musicianship, only needing profound intellectuality and intense emotionalism to be great. Will Mr. Prout, equipped as he is with all that art can bestow, move up into the higher regions of breathing thought and burning word? Who knows? He is in the vigour of his powers and the full flush of his ambition. Anyhow, there is every reason to cheer him on his course."

"[the chorus Weep for the Viking Slain at the close of the cantata Hereward] is most remarkable for genuine pathos and power [and] worthy of any living composer, we care not who he may be. Hereward is an honour to native art [and] the result was that the audience received the work with unbounded applause."

"In the music of [Alfred] Mr. Prout has made a decided advance upon Hereward, into the choruses of which he threw his great strength. Alfred, on the contrary, although containing some effective and well-planned choruses, is distinguished by solo music of remarkable merit. A Triumphal March too, (the only purely orchestral movement in the work) claims notice, both from its intrinsic excellence and the skilful manner in which the instruments are treated. At the conclusion of the performance the composer was called forward and received quite an ovation."

"Mr. Prout, given time and the continued literary assistance on Mr. Grist, will provide a musical illustration of every stirring epoch in the early history of England. A story of English chivalry and manhood such as this naturally suggests bold, vigorous, and straight-forward musical treatment, and that being so, we could not name a composer more capable of rendering it justice than Mr. Prout. The careering of the steeds, the shock of combat, and the growing excitement of the spectators are graphically portrayed in this splendid chorus [Laissez aller! Heaven guard the right!], which we have little hesitation in predicting will be pronounced the composer's finest effort. That The Red Cross Knight, as a whole, will fully sustain and even enhance Mr. Prout's reputation there can be little doubt. The orchestration is certain to be masterly – the composer's name is a guarantee for that; and with so many points in its favour, it will be strange indeed if the work is not destined to enjoy the tide of success for a lengthy period."

By 1891, Prout's musical style had come to be regarded as outmoded: following the first performance of his Suite de Ballet the Musical Times thought that

"It is in three unpretentious movements, written in a somewhat quaint and old-English style. The final "Tempo di Valse" is trivial."

In a modern survey of Prout's symphonic works, Jürgen Schaarwächter judged that

"[in Symphony No.2] the thematic development is more progressive than might be expected. The instrumentation is predictable, but foreshadows orchestration techniques that can be found in several inferior compositions of the 1880s, for example the youthful Richard Strauss symphonies. [With the Symphony No.3, Prout] composed a rather humdrum work, whose themes are quite dull. The finale [...] combines the qualities of careful overall conception and inspired instrumentation. However, formally speaking, the piece is disappointingly predictable; Prout uses his technical abilities largely in favour of academically "correct" composition. [Although Symphony No.4 is] doubtlessly a charming composition, sequencing is again an important means of developing the thematic material, and Prout's compositional techniques remain strongly rooted in the first half of the 19th century. The slow movement is a pensive, lyrical piece echoing Schumann at times. Perhaps the most inspired movement (although the thematic material remains down-to-earth), the scherzo is spirited, charming, elegant. An energetic finale closes a light, though obviously rather fine composition."

== Last years ==
Although performances of his works greatly diminished towards the close of the nineteenth century, the occasional concert included his music: on 30 December 1897, at Bournemouth, Dan Godfrey played the Symphony No.3. Among Prout's many students were Arthur Thomas, Eugen d'Albert, John Waterhouse, Henry Wood, Ethel Barns and Edward German. He died at Hackney, London, on 5 December 1909, and was buried at Abney Park Cemetery.

== Personal life ==
Prout married Julia West in 1861, and they lived at 246 Richmond Road, Hackney. There were five children: Florence (1862–1921), Louis Beethoven (1864–1944), Edith Julia (1867–1913), Alice (1869–1870) and Alice Ellen Prout (1871–1957). Louis Beethoven was a writer on musical theory, having trained under his father at the Royal Academy, and becoming professor at the Guildhall School. Louis Beethoven Prout's principal works are an Analysis of Bach's 48 Fugues (Weekes); Harmonic Analysis (Augener); Sidelights on Harmony (Augener); and Time, Rhythm and Expression (Augener). Like his sister Alice Ellen, he was also an entomologist, being a foremost authority on the Geometridae, or geometer moths.

His obituary in The Musical Times noted that:

"Prout had a phenomenal musical memory. He was a devout Bach worshipper, and probably knew this incomparable composer's music as well as any man in Europe. His attitude to Wagner's music was on the whole appreciative. To the extreme moderns he was less sympathetic. Prout was a keen and brilliant conversationalist, always able, in musical matters at least, to support his opinion by wise saws and modern instances. Punctuality was one of his virtues, and he planned his work with marvellous exactitude. He would tell you in March all that he meant to accomplish in the next few months, and on what day in July and by what train he would depart for his holiday, and it all came off. He was a rare linguist, a chess player, a great smoker, a raconteur of exceptional interest, somewhat of a Bohemian in dress, and his whole life was an inspiration to his great circle of friends."

== Works ==
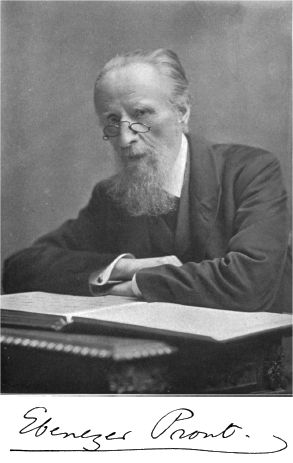
Prout in later life

=== Operetta ===
- 1883 – Love and Taxation

=== Incidental music ===
- 1862 – The Doom of Devorgoil (unfinished)

=== Orchestral ===
- 1867 – Symphony No.1 in C (revised version 1873, Crystal Palace, London, 28 February 1874)
- 1876 – Symphony No.2 in G Minor (Crystal Palace, London, 1 December 1877)
- 1878 – Minuet and Trio for orchestra, Op.14 (St James's Hall, London, 5 March 1878)
- 1878 – Suite in D
- 1881 – Twelfth Night, overture (Colston Hall, Bristol, 14 February 1881)
- 1885 – Symphony No.3 in F, Op.22 (Birmingham Festival, 28 August 1885)
- 1886 – Symphony No.4 in D (Queen's College, Oxford, 4 June 1886)
- 1889 – Rokeby, overture (Crystal Palace, London, 23 March 1889)
- 1891 – Suite de Ballet in E, Op.28 (Westminster Orchestral Society, London, 27 May 1891)
- 1906 – Suite for small orchestra, Op.33

=== Solo instrumentalist and orchestra ===
- 1870 – Organ Concerto No.1 in E minor, Op.5 (Crystal Palace, London, 19 October 1872)
- 1885 – Organ Concerto No.2 in E flat major, Op.35 (Colston Hall, Bristol, 6 April 1885)
- Clarinet Concerto in B flat (world premiere, 4 March 2023, Peter Cigleris, Greenwich Chamber Orchestra)

=== Choral and vocal ===
- 1857 – Requiem Mass
- 1875 – Magnificat for solo voices, chorus, and orchestra, Op.7 (Crystal Palace, London, 15 January 1876)
- 1875 – Evening Service in E flat for solo quartet, chorus, orchestra and organ, Op.8
- 1876 – Magnificat and Nunc dimittis in F, Op.9
- 1876 – When the Lord turned, anthem, Op.27
- 1877 – Hail to the Chief for chorus and orchestra, Op.10 (Alexandra Palace, London, 10 May 1877)
- 1877 – Happy is the man, anthem, Op.11
- 1878 – Hereward, cantata, Op.12 (Hackney Choral Association, St James's Hall, London, 4 June 1879)
- 1879 – Morning and Evening Service in F, Op.13
- 1882 – Alfred, cantata, Op.16 (Hackney Choral Association, Shoreditch Town Hall, London, 1 May 1882)
- 1884 – Magnificat and Nunc dimittis in D, Op.19
- 1884 – Arise, shine, anthem
- 1885 – Freedom, ode for baritone soloist, chorus and orchestra, Op.20 (Hackney Choral Association, London, 20 April 1885)
- 1885 – Queen Aimée, or The Maiden's Crown, cantata for female voices (soli and chorus) and piano, Op.21
- 1886 – O be joyful in the Lord (Psalm 100) for soprano solo, chorus, orchestra and organ, Op.23
- 1887 – The Red Cross Knight, cantata, Op.24 (Huddersfield Festival, Huddersfield, 7 October 1887)
- 1889 – Damon and Phintias, cantata for male voices (soli and chorus) and orchestra, Op.25 (Oxford, 31 May 1889)
- 1891 – When the Lord turned (Psalm 126) for soli, chorus and orchestra, Op.27 (St Paul's Cathedral, London, 28 May 1891)
- 1891 – Behold, my servant, anthem
- 1895 – We give Thee Thanks, O Lord God Almighty, anthem for eight voices, Op.29
- 1899 – Jesu dulcis memoria, chorus for female voices, Op.31
- 1905 – Salve Regina for female chorus and orchestra, Op.34

=== Vocal soloist and orchestra ===
- 1887 – The Song of Judith, scena for contralto soloist and orchestra (Norwich Festival, Norwich, 12 October 1887)

=== Chamber works ===
- 1860 – Piano Quintet in G, Op.3
- 1862 – String Quartet No.1 in E flat, Op.1
- 1865 – Piano Quartet No.1 in C, Op.2
- 1870 – Romance in F for viola and piano, Op.32
- 1872 – Duo Concertante in A for piano and harmonium, Op.6
- 1881 – String Quartet No.2 in B flat, Op.15
- 1882 – Sonata for flute and piano, Op.17
- 1882 – Sonata in D for clarinet (or viola) and piano, Op.26
- 1883 – Piano Quartet No.2 in F, Op.18

=== Instrumental works ===
- 1870 – Postlude in C minor for organ
- Organ Sonata, Op.4

== Scores and manuscripts ==
Many works by Prout were published. Several autograph scores are missing.

=== Published ===
- Addison, Hollier & Lucas, London, published a set of parts for String Quartet No.1.
- Augener & Co., London, published the full score and a piano duet arrangement of the Minuet and Trio, the full score of Organ Concerto No.1, the full score of the Suite de Ballet, the full score and a piano score of the Triumphal March from Alfred, the vocal score of Alfred and We give Thee Thanks, O Lord God Almighty, together with scores and sets of parts for String Quartet No.2, the Piano Quintet, Piano Quartet No.1 and Piano Quartet No.2, the Organ Sonata, the Duo Concertante and the Clarinet Sonata.
- Novello, Ewer & Co., London, published the full orchestral score and a piano duet arrangement of Symphony No.3, together with vocal scores of Hereward, Freedom, Queen Aimée, O be joyful in the Lord (Psalm 100), The Red Cross Knight and Damon and Phintias.
- Stanley Lucas, Weber & Co, London, issued the full score of the Magnificat, Op.7, circa 1876.
- Vincent Music Co., London, published the full score of Organ Concerto No.2 together with a piano score of the Suite for small orchestra and vocal scores of Salve Regina and Jesu Dulcis memoria.

=== Autograph ===
- The autograph full scores of both versions of Symphony No.1 are held by the Library of Trinity College Dublin (Prout G.147/ Prout G.148) together with autograph scores of Organ Concerto No.1 (Prout G.139), String Quartet No.1 (Prout G.145 no.1), Piano Quartet No.1 (Prout G.145 no.2), The Doom of Devergoil (Prout G.145 no.3) and the Salve Regina (Prout H.199 no.2).
- The full score of Symphony No.2 is at Cambridge University Library (MS Add. 9151) together with String Quartet No.1 (MS Add.9066(1)) and String Quartet No.2 (MS Add.9066(2)).
- The full score of Symphony No.3 is at the Bodleian Library, Oxford (MS. Tenbury 325).
- The full score of Symphony No.4 is held by Queen's College, Oxford where the first performance took place on 4 June 1886.
- The full score of the Minuet and Trio is held by the Fitzwilliam Museum, Cambridge (MU.MS.788).
- Autograph full orchestral scores of Hail to the Chief, Freedom, O be joyful in the Lord (Psalm 100) and The Red Cross Knight are held by the Library of the Royal College of Music, London (Add.Mss 5158a-e).
- The full score of Damon and Phintias is at the British Library, London (Add MS 50779).
- The full score of the Clarinet Concerto is held by the Library of the Royal Academy of Music, London (MS 1155).

== Theoretical works ==
- Instrumentation (Novello Music Primer, 1877)
- Harmony, its Theory and Practice (1889, rev. 1901: 20 editions by 1903)
- Counterpoint (1890)
- Double Counterpoint and Canon (1891)
- Fugue (1891)
- Fugal Analysis (1892)
- Musical Form (1893)
- Applied Forms (1895)
- The Orchestra, Vol. I (1898)
- The Orchestra, Vol. II (1899)
- Mozart (1905)

== Sources ==
- A. Eaglefield-Hull, A Dictionary of Modern Music and Musicians (Dent, London 1924).
- Ebenezer Prout (A Portrait), The Musical Times Vol. 40, No. 674 (April 1899), pp. 225–230
