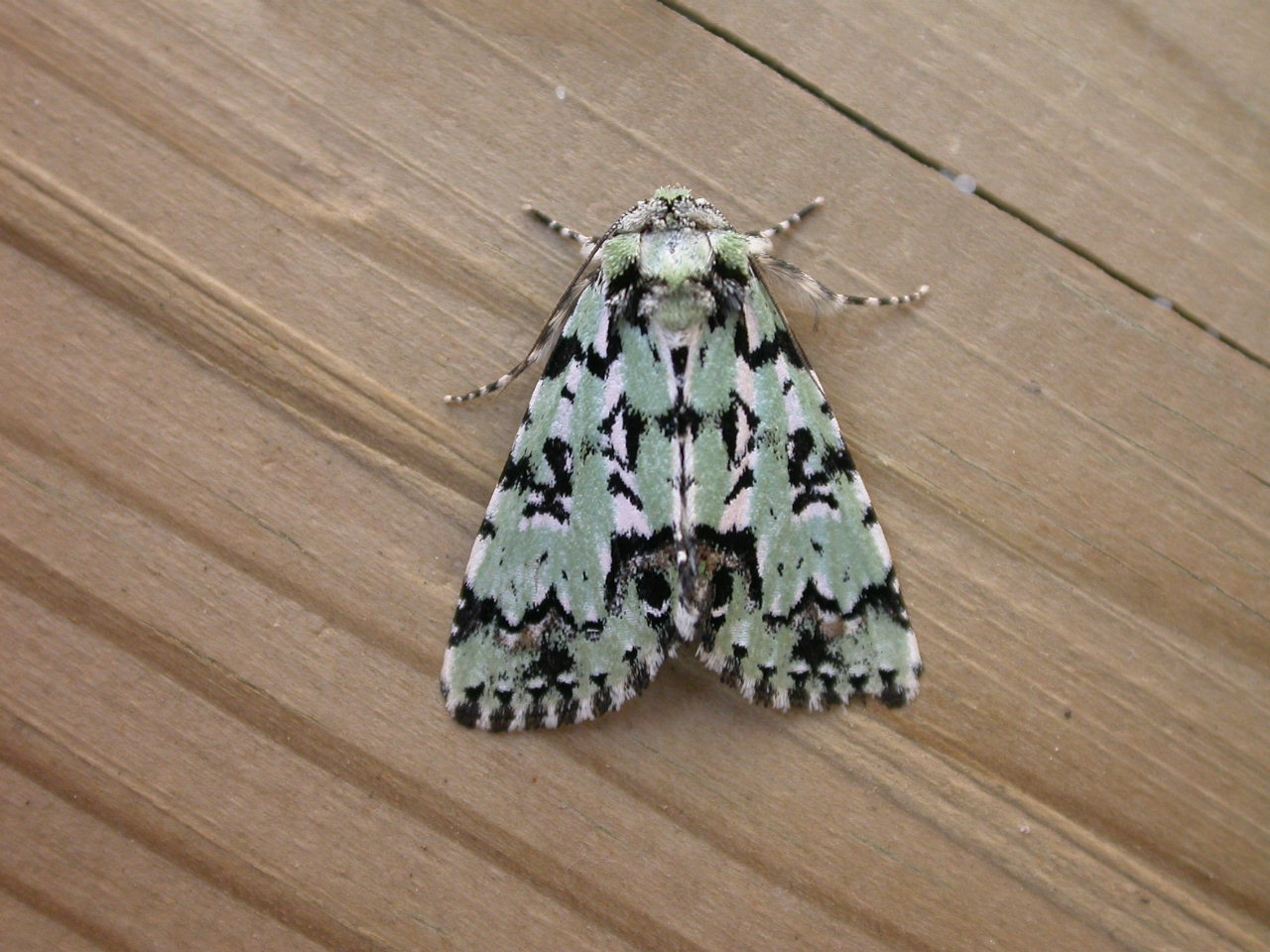
- The scarce merveille du jour (Moma alpium).

Scientific classification
- Kingdom: Animalia
- Phylum: Arthropoda
- Clade: Pancrustacea
- Class: Insecta
- Order: Lepidoptera
- Superfamily: Noctuoidea
- Family: Noctuidae
- Subfamily: Pantheinae
- Genus: Moma; Hübner, 1820

Synonyms
- Diphteramoma Berio, 1961

= Moma (moth) =

Genus of moths

Moma is a genus of owlet moths in the subfamily Dyopsinae. The genus was erected by Jacob Hübner in 1820

== Description ==
Their eyes are hairy. The proboscis is well developed. Palpi obliquely upturned and clothed with long hair below, and short third joint. Thorax and abdomen tuftless, where abdomen clothed with long hair at sides. Larva forms a cocoon in a rolled up leaf.

== Species ==
- Moma abbreviata (Sugi, 1968)
- Moma alpium (Osbeck, 1778)
- Moma fulvicollis (de Lattin, 1949)
- Moma glauca Turati, 1911
- Moma tsushimana Sugi, 1982
