= Smilepholcia =

Scientific classification
- Kingdom: Animalia
- Phylum: Arthropoda
- Clade: Pancrustacea
- Class: Insecta
- Order: Lepidoptera
- Superfamily: Noctuoidea
- Family: Noctuidae
- Subfamily: Pantheinae
- Genus: Smilepholcia; Prout, 1924

Genus of moths

Smilepholcia is a genus of Lepidoptera in the family of owlet moths, also known as Noctuidae.

== Species ==
- Smilepholcia luteifascia Hampson, 1894
