= Rhesalides =

Scientific classification
- Kingdom: Animalia
- Phylum: Arthropoda
- Clade: Pancrustacea
- Class: Insecta
- Order: Lepidoptera
- Superfamily: Noctuoidea
- Family: Erebidae
- Subfamily: Calpinae
- Genus: Rhesalides; A. E. Prout, 1921

Genus of moths

Rhesalides is a genus of moths of the family Erebidae. The genus was erected by Alice Ellen Prout in 1921.

== Species ==
- Rhesalides curvata (T. P. Lucas, 1895) Queensland, New Guinea, Admiralty Islands, Fiji
- Rhesalides keiensis A. E. Prout, 1921 Kai Islands
- Rhesalides natalensis Hampson, 1926 KwaZulu-Natal
- Rhesalides nigeriensis Hampson, 1926 southern Nigeria
