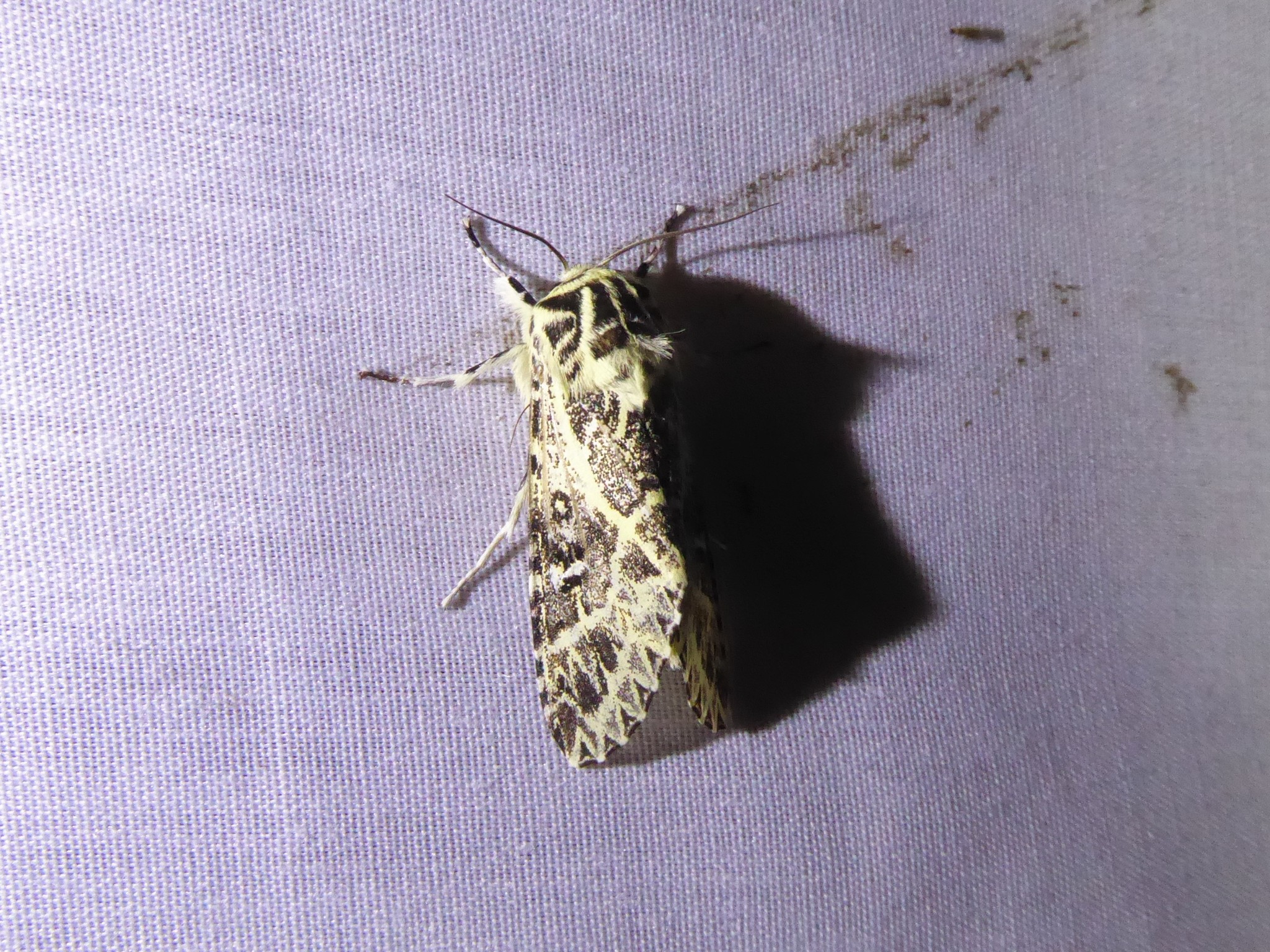
- Lichnoptera spp.

Scientific classification
- Domain: Eukaryota
- Kingdom: Animalia
- Phylum: Arthropoda
- Class: Insecta
- Order: Lepidoptera
- Superfamily: Noctuoidea
- Family: Noctuidae
- Subfamily: Pantheinae
- Genus: Lichnoptera; Herrich-Schäffer, [1856]

= Lichnoptera =

Genus of moths

Lichnoptera is a genus of moths of the family Noctuidae.

== Species ==
- Lichnoptera albidiscata Dognin, 1912 (syn: Lichnoptera albidior Draudt, 1924, Lichnoptera albidiscata flavescens Draudt, 1924)
- Lichnoptera atrifrons Dognin, 1912
- Lichnoptera cavillator Walker, 1856 (syn: Lichnoptera bivaria (Walker, 1856), Lichnoptera cavillator flavescens Draudt, 1924, Lichnoptera gracilis (Swinhoe, 1900), Lichnoptera reducta Draudt, 1924)
- Lichnoptera decora (Morrison, 1875)
- Lichnoptera felina Druce, 1898
- Lichnoptera gulo Herrich-Schäffer, [1858]
- Lichnoptera hieroglyphigera (Strand, 1912)
- Lichnoptera illudens (Walker, 1856) (syn: Lichnoptera pythion (Druce, 1889))
- Lichnoptera marmorifera (Walker, 1865)
- Lichnoptera moesta Herrich-Schäffer, [1858]
- Lichnoptera moestoides Dognin, 1912
- Lichnoptera primulina Dognin, 1912
- Lichnoptera rufitincta Hampson, 1913
- Lichnoptera spissa (H. Edwards, 1887) (syn: Lichnoptera pollux H. Edwards, 1887)
