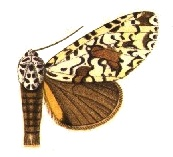

Scientific classification
- Domain: Eukaryota
- Kingdom: Animalia
- Phylum: Arthropoda
- Class: Insecta
- Order: Lepidoptera
- Superfamily: Noctuoidea
- Family: Noctuidae
- Genus: Lichnoptera
- Species: L. moesta

Binomial name
- Lichnoptera moesta Herrich-Schäffer, [1858]

= Lichnoptera moesta =

Species of moth

Lichnoptera moesta is a species of moth of the family Noctuidae. It is found in South America including Venezuela.
