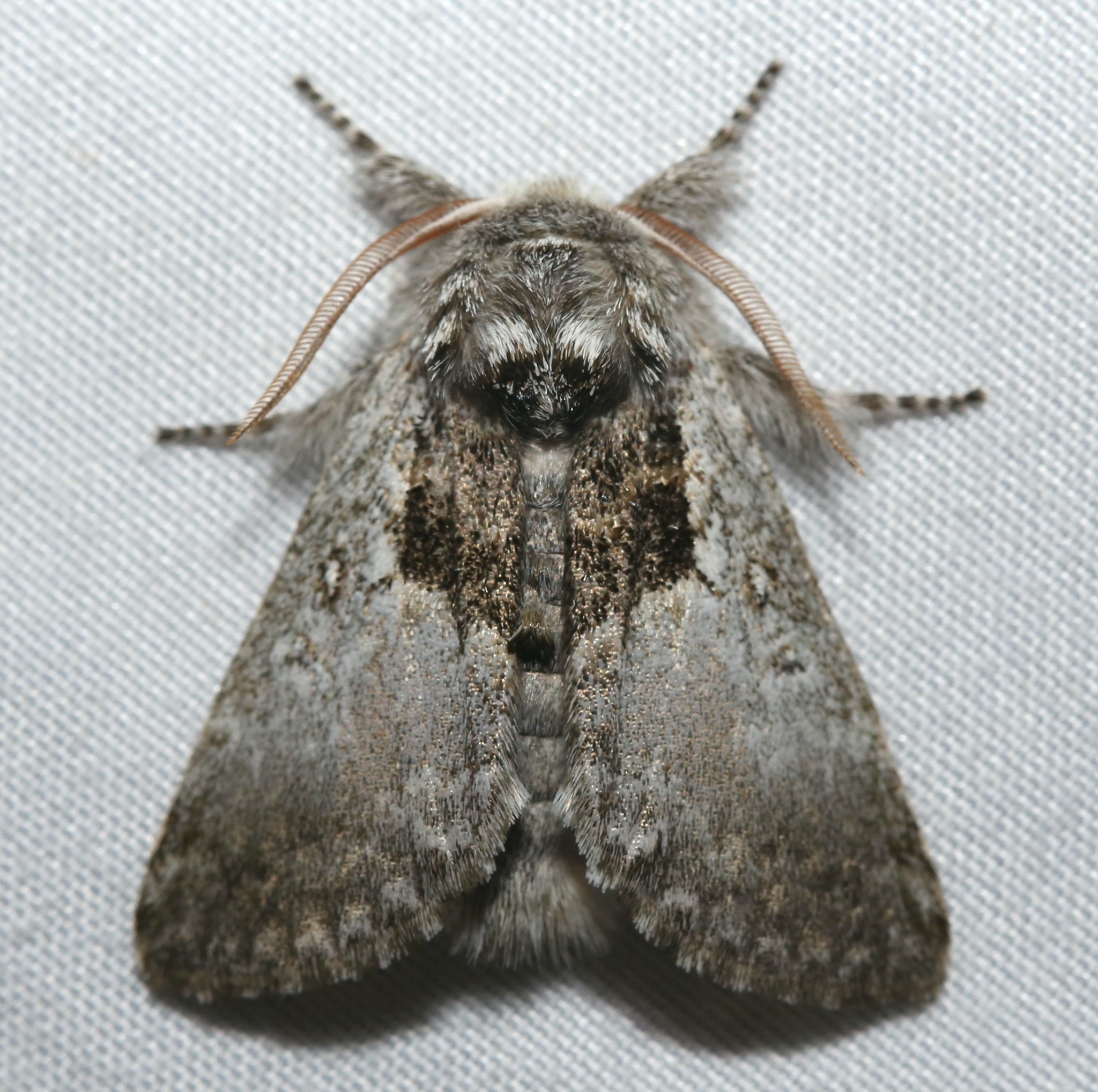

Scientific classification
- Kingdom: Animalia
- Phylum: Arthropoda
- Class: Insecta
- Order: Lepidoptera
- Superfamily: Noctuoidea
- Family: Noctuidae
- Genus: Colocasia
- Species: C. flavicornis

Binomial name
- Colocasia flavicornis (J. B. Smith, 1884)

Synonyms
- Colocasia infanta (J. B. Smith, 1911); Colocasia electa (J. B. Smith, 1911)

= Colocasia flavicornis =

Yellowhorn

Species of moth

Colocasia flavicornis (yellowhorn) is a moth of the family Noctuidae. It is found in North America, east of the Rocky Mountains. In Canada, it is found in Ontario, Quebec, New Brunswick, Nova Scotia, Saskatchewan and Manitoba.

Adults are on wing from March to September. There are two generations per year.

The larvae feed on a variety of deciduous trees, including beech, oak, maple and elm.
