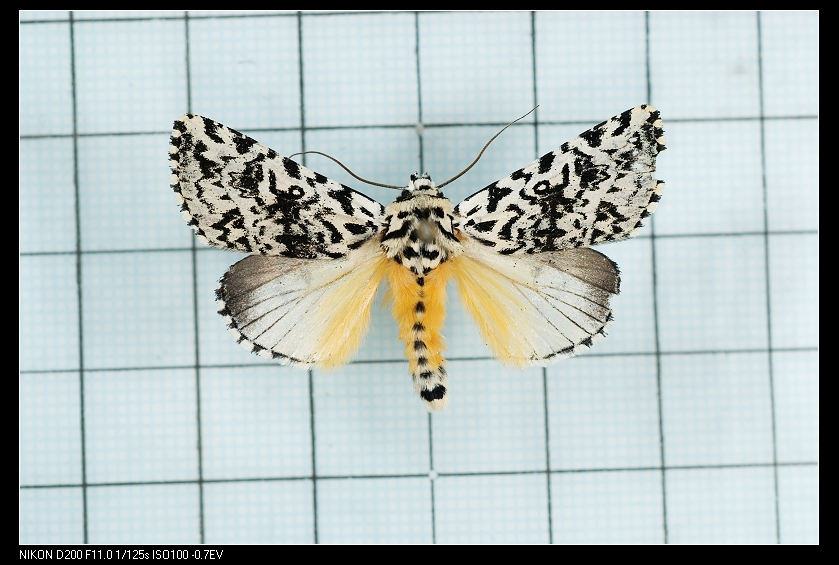

Scientific classification
- Kingdom: Animalia
- Phylum: Arthropoda
- Clade: Pancrustacea
- Class: Insecta
- Order: Lepidoptera
- Superfamily: Noctuoidea
- Family: Noctuidae
- Genus: Trichosea
- Species: T. diffusa

Binomial name
- Trichosea diffusa Sugi, 1986

= Trichosea diffusa =

Species of moth

Trichosea diffusa is a species of moth of the family Noctuidae. It is found in Asia, including India, Taiwan Nepal, and Thailand.

The wingspan is 34–44 mm.
