= Anepholcia talboti =

Scientific classification
- Kingdom: Animalia
- Phylum: Arthropoda
- Clade: Pancrustacea
- Class: Insecta
- Order: Lepidoptera
- Superfamily: Noctuoidea
- Family: Noctuidae
- Genus: Anepholcia
- Species: A. talboti

Binomial name
- Anepholcia talboti Prout & Talbot, 1924

Species of moth

Anepholcia talboti is a moth in the family Noctuidae. It is found on Sumatra.
