= Trisuloides xizanga =

Scientific classification
- Kingdom: Animalia
- Phylum: Arthropoda
- Clade: Pancrustacea
- Class: Insecta
- Order: Lepidoptera
- Superfamily: Noctuoidea
- Family: Noctuidae
- Genus: Trisuloides
- Species: T. xizanga

Binomial name
- Trisuloides xizanga H.L. Han, Behounek & Kononenko, 2011

Species of moth

Trisuloides xizanga is a moth of the family Noctuidae. It is found in China (Xizang).
