= Catocala thomsoni =

Scientific classification
- Kingdom: Animalia
- Phylum: Arthropoda
- Clade: Pancrustacea
- Class: Insecta
- Order: Lepidoptera
- Superfamily: Noctuoidea
- Family: Erebidae
- Genus: Catocala
- Species: C. thomsoni

Binomial name
- Catocala thomsoni A. E. Prout, 1924

Species of moth

Catocala thomsoni is a moth in the family Erebidae first described by A. E. Prout in 1924. It is found in northern China.
