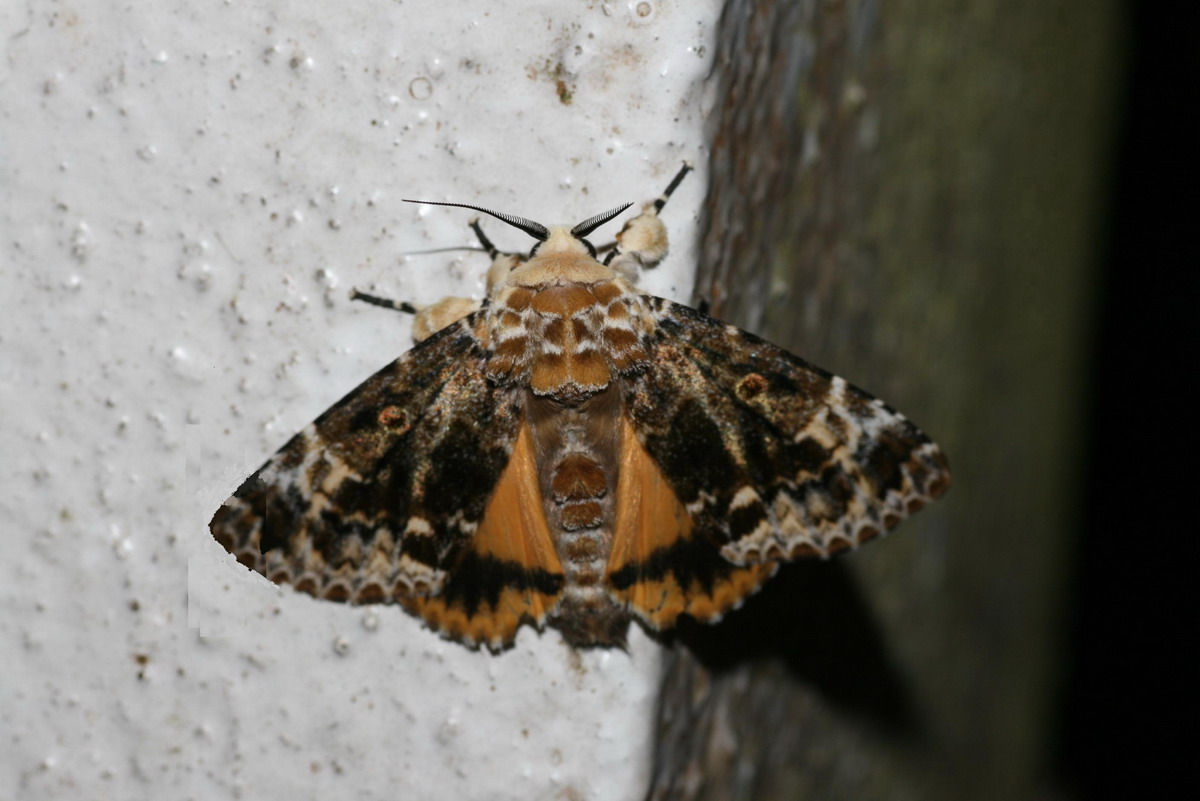

Scientific classification
- Domain: Eukaryota
- Kingdom: Animalia
- Phylum: Arthropoda
- Class: Insecta
- Order: Lepidoptera
- Superfamily: Noctuoidea
- Family: Noctuidae
- Genus: Anepholcia
- Species: A. pygaria

Binomial name
- Anepholcia pygaria Warren, 1912

Synonyms
- Trisuloides pygaria Warren, 1912

= Anepholcia pygaria =

Species of moth

Anepholcia pygaria is a moth in the family Noctuidae. It is found on Peninsular Malaysia, Sumatra, and Borneo.

The forewings are mottled, bronzy brown and the hindwings are yellow with a dark brown border.
