= Phaegorista formosa =

Scientific classification
- Kingdom: Animalia
- Phylum: Arthropoda
- Clade: Pancrustacea
- Class: Insecta
- Order: Lepidoptera
- Superfamily: Noctuoidea
- Family: Erebidae
- Genus: Phaegorista
- Species: P. formosa

Binomial name
- Phaegorista formosa Butler, 1877

Species of moth

Phaegorista formosa is a species of fruit-piercing moth in the family Erebidae.
