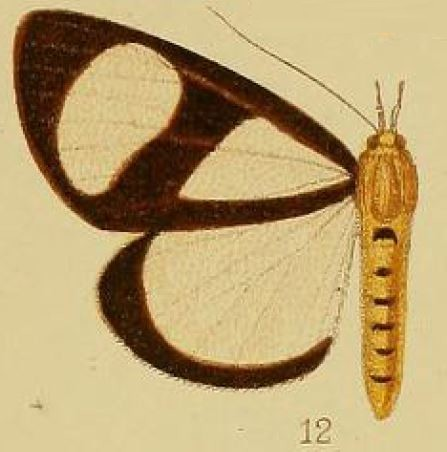
- Phaegorista xanthosoma

Scientific classification
- Kingdom: Animalia
- Phylum: Arthropoda
- Clade: Pancrustacea
- Class: Insecta
- Order: Lepidoptera
- Superfamily: Noctuoidea
- Family: Erebidae
- Genus: Phaegorista
- Species: P. xanthosoma

Binomial name
- Phaegorista xanthosoma Hampson, 1910

= Phaegorista xanthosoma =

Species of moth

Phaegorista xanthosoma is a species of fruit-piercing moth in the family Erebidae. It is found in southeastern Africa.
