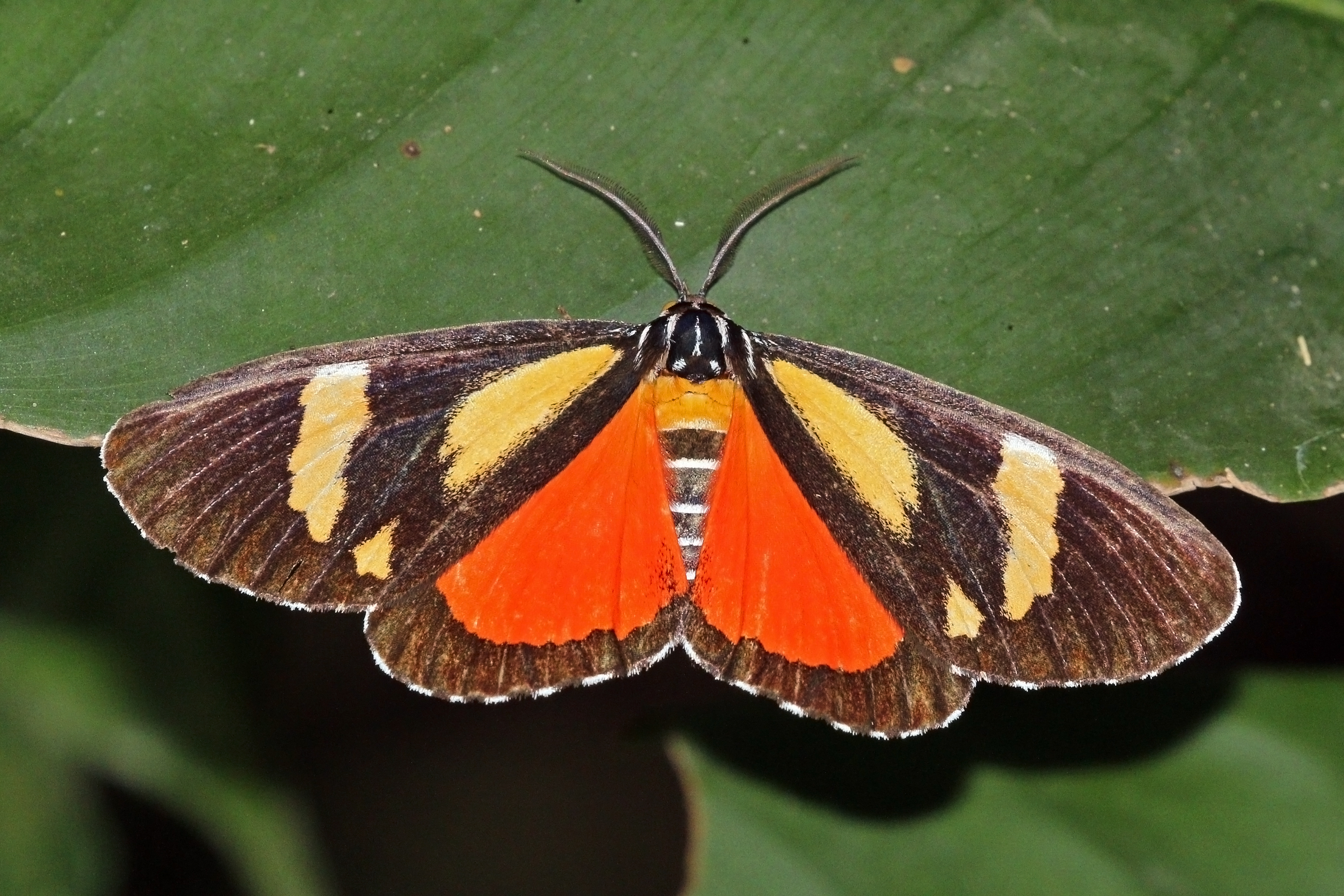
- P. agaristoides, Ghana

Scientific classification
- Domain: Eukaryota
- Kingdom: Animalia
- Phylum: Arthropoda
- Class: Insecta
- Order: Lepidoptera
- Superfamily: Noctuoidea
- Family: Erebidae
- Subfamily: Aganainae
- Genus: Phaegorista; Boisduval, 1836

Synonyms
- Stemonoceras Karsch, 1895

= Phaegorista =

Genus of moths

Phaegorista is a genus of moths in the family Erebidae erected by Jean Baptiste Boisduval in 1836.

== Species ==
- Phaegorista agaristoides Boisduval, [1836]
- Phaegorista bicurvata Gaede, 1926
- Phaegorista bisignibasis Prout, 1918
- Phaegorista enarges Tams, 1930
- Phaegorista formosa Butler, 1877
- Phaegorista leucomelas (Herrich-Schäffer, [1855])
- Phaegorista prouti Joicey & Talbot, 1921
- Phaegorista rubriventris Aurivillius, 1925
- Phaegorista similis Walker, 1869
- Phaegorista trialbata Prout, 1918
- Phaegorista xanthosoma Hampson, 1910
- Phaegorista zebra Butler, 1897
