= Ableptina =

Scientific classification
- Kingdom: Animalia
- Phylum: Arthropoda
- Clade: Pancrustacea
- Class: Insecta
- Order: Lepidoptera
- Superfamily: Noctuoidea
- Family: Erebidae
- Subfamily: Herminiinae
- Genus: Ableptina; A. E. Prout, 1927

Genus of moths

Ableptina is a genus of moths of the family Noctuidae. The genus was erected by Alice Ellen Prout in 1927.

== Species ==
- Ableptina delospila A. E. Prout, 1927
- Ableptina nephelopera (Hampson, 1909)
- Ableptina nubifera (Hampson, 1902)
