= Meleneta =

Scientific classification
- Domain: Eukaryota
- Kingdom: Animalia
- Phylum: Arthropoda
- Class: Insecta
- Order: Lepidoptera
- Superfamily: Noctuoidea
- Family: Noctuidae
- Subfamily: Pantheinae
- Genus: Meleneta; J. B. Smith, 1908

Genus of moths

Meleneta is a genus of moths of the family Noctuidae.

== Species ==
- Meleneta antennata J. B. Smith, 1908
