= Catocala jansseni =

Scientific classification
- Kingdom: Animalia
- Phylum: Arthropoda
- Clade: Pancrustacea
- Class: Insecta
- Order: Lepidoptera
- Superfamily: Noctuoidea
- Family: Erebidae
- Genus: Catocala
- Species: C. jansseni

Binomial name
- Catocala jansseni A. E. Prout, 1924

Species of moth

Catocala jansseni is a moth in the family Erebidae first described by A. E. Prout in 1924. It is found in China.
