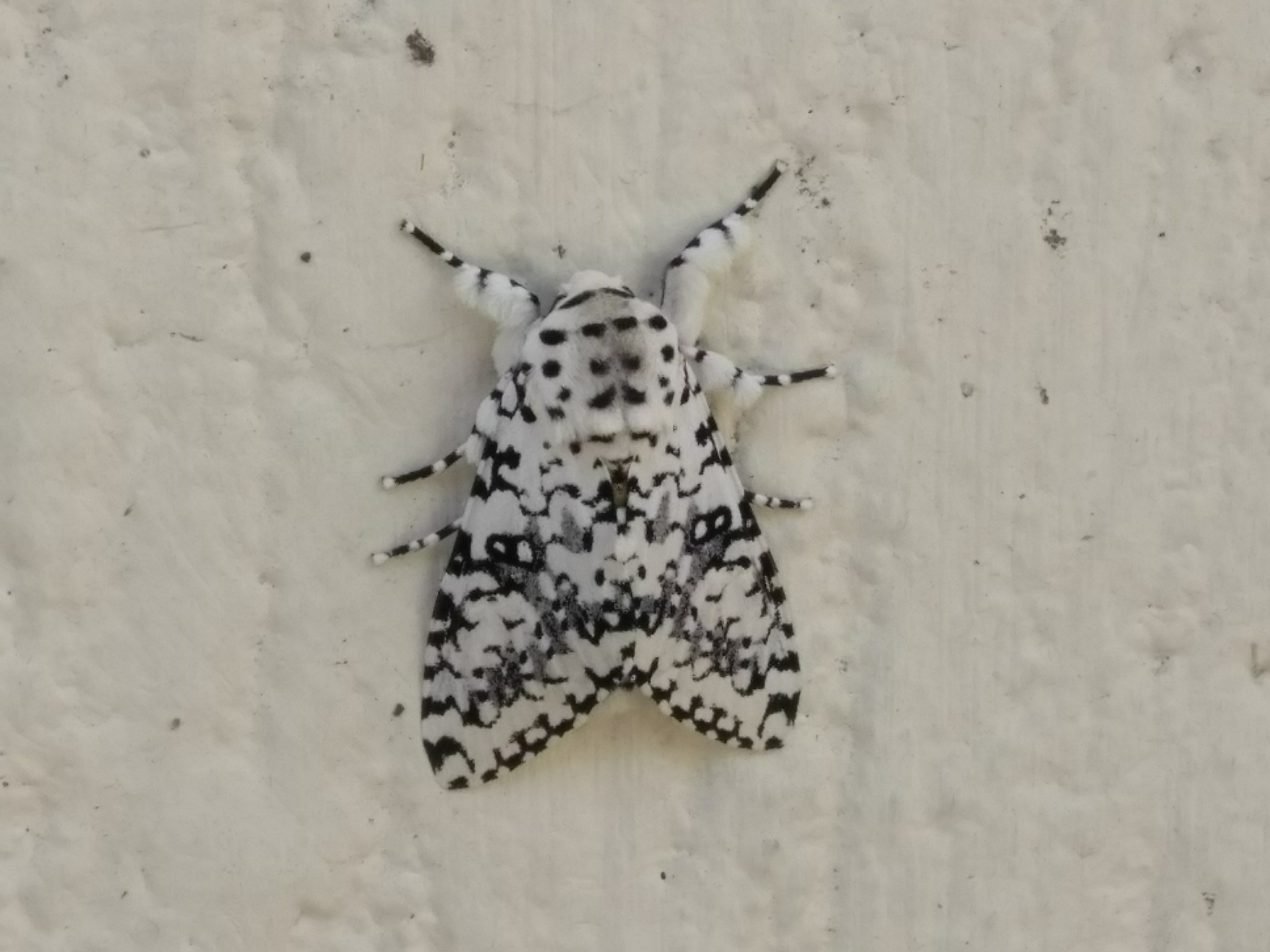

Scientific classification
- Domain: Eukaryota
- Kingdom: Animalia
- Phylum: Arthropoda
- Class: Insecta
- Order: Lepidoptera
- Superfamily: Noctuoidea
- Family: Noctuidae
- Genus: Lichnoptera
- Species: L. decora

Binomial name
- Lichnoptera decora (Morrison, 1875)

= Lichnoptera decora =

Species of moth

Lichnoptera decora is a species of moth in the family Noctuidae (the owlet moths). It is found in North America.

The MONA or Hodges number for Lichnoptera decora is 9187.
