= Nagia dentiscripta =

Scientific classification
- Kingdom: Animalia
- Phylum: Arthropoda
- Clade: Pancrustacea
- Class: Insecta
- Order: Lepidoptera
- Superfamily: Noctuoidea
- Family: Erebidae
- Genus: Nagia
- Species: N. dentiscripta

Binomial name
- Nagia dentiscripta A. E. Prout, 1921

Synonyms
- Catephia dentiscripta

Species of moth

Nagia dentiscripta is a species of moth in the family Erebidae first described by Alice Ellen Prout in 1921. It is found in Central Africa.
