= Aulocheta =

Scientific classification
- Kingdom: Animalia
- Phylum: Arthropoda
- Clade: Pancrustacea
- Class: Insecta
- Order: Lepidoptera
- Superfamily: Noctuoidea
- Family: Erebidae
- Subfamily: Hypeninae
- Genus: Aulocheta; A. E. Prout, 1927

Genus of moths

Aulocheta is a genus of moths of the family Erebidae. The genus was erected by Alice Ellen Prout in 1927.

== Species ==
- Aulocheta parallelalis (Mabille, 1880) Madagascar
- Aulocheta violacea A. E. Prout, 1927 São Tomé
