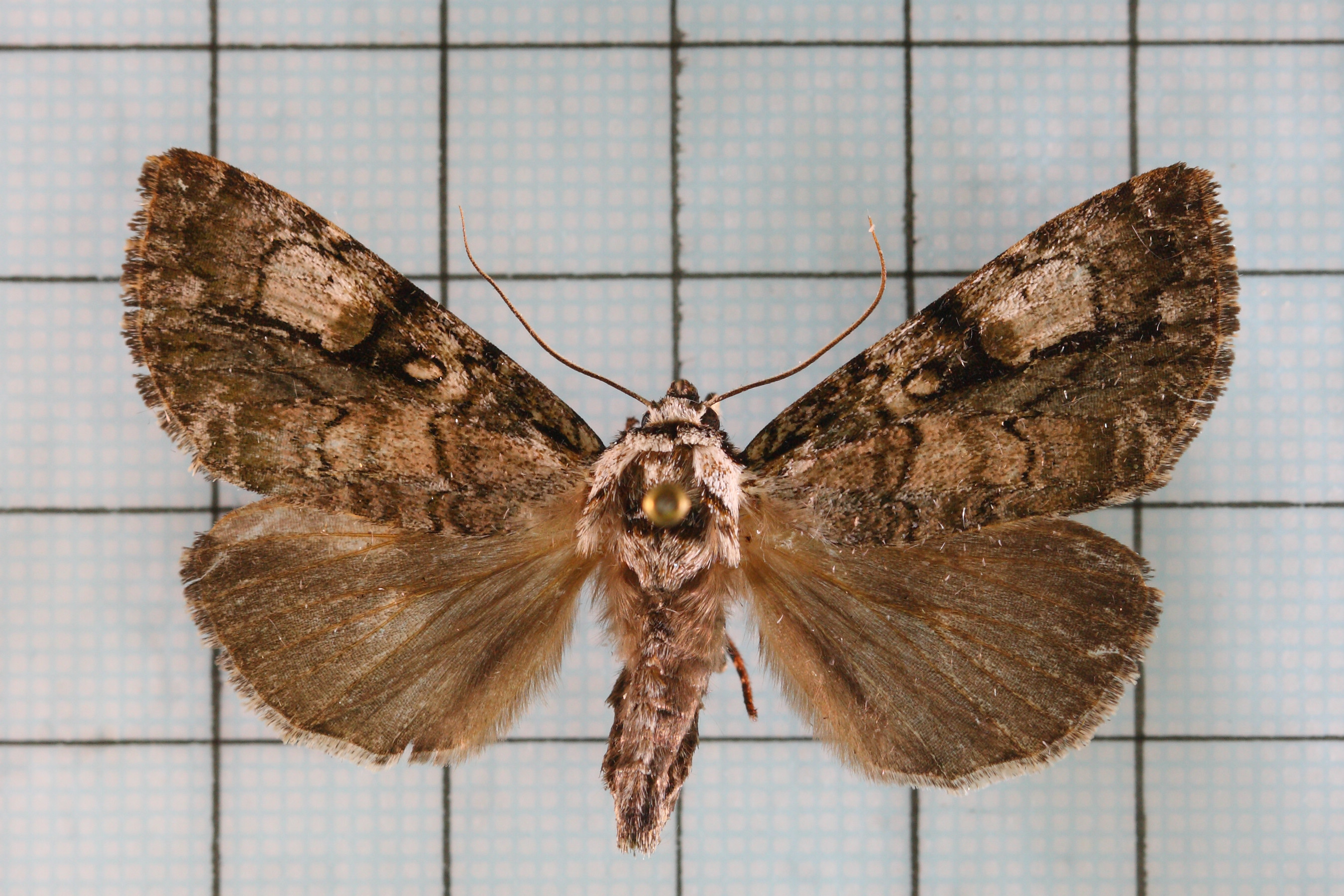
- Anacronicta nitida

Scientific classification
- Domain: Eukaryota
- Kingdom: Animalia
- Phylum: Arthropoda
- Class: Insecta
- Order: Lepidoptera
- Superfamily: Noctuoidea
- Family: Noctuidae
- Subfamily: Pantheinae
- Genus: Anacronicta; Warren, 1909

Synonyms
- Anacronycta Bryk, 1941

= Anacronicta =

Genus of moths

Anacronicta is a genus of moths of the family Noctuidae.

== Species ==
- Anacronicta caliginea (Butler, 1881)
- Anacronicta flavala (Moore, 1867)
- Anacronicta fuscipennis (Warren, 1912)
- Anacronicta infausta (Walker, 1856)
- Anacronicta horishana Matsumura, 1931
- Anacronicta nitida (Butler, 1878)
- Anacronicta obscura (Leech, 1900)
- Anacronicta okinawensis Sugi, 1970
- Anacronicta pallidipennis (Warren, 1912)
- Anacronicta plumbea (Butler, 1881)
