= Subsimplicia =

Scientific classification
- Kingdom: Animalia
- Phylum: Arthropoda
- Clade: Pancrustacea
- Class: Insecta
- Order: Lepidoptera
- Superfamily: Noctuoidea
- Family: Erebidae
- Subfamily: Herminiinae
- Genus: Subsimplicia; A. E. Prout, 1928

Genus of moths

Subsimplicia is a genus of moths of the family Erebidae. The genus was erected by Alice Ellen Prout in 1928.

== Species ==
- Subsimplicia iodes (Rothschild, 1920) Sumatra
- Subsimplicia punctilinea Prout, 1928 Borneo
- Subsimplicia purpuralis (Holloway, 1976) Borneo
- Subsimplicia reniformis Holloway, 2008 Borneo
