= Phaegorista bicurvata =

Scientific classification
- Kingdom: Animalia
- Phylum: Arthropoda
- Clade: Pancrustacea
- Class: Insecta
- Order: Lepidoptera
- Superfamily: Noctuoidea
- Family: Erebidae
- Genus: Phaegorista
- Species: P. bicurvata

Binomial name
- Phaegorista bicurvata Gaede, 1926

Species of moth

Phaegorista bicurvata is a species of fruit-piercing moth in the family Erebidae. It is found in Africa, including the Central African Republic.
