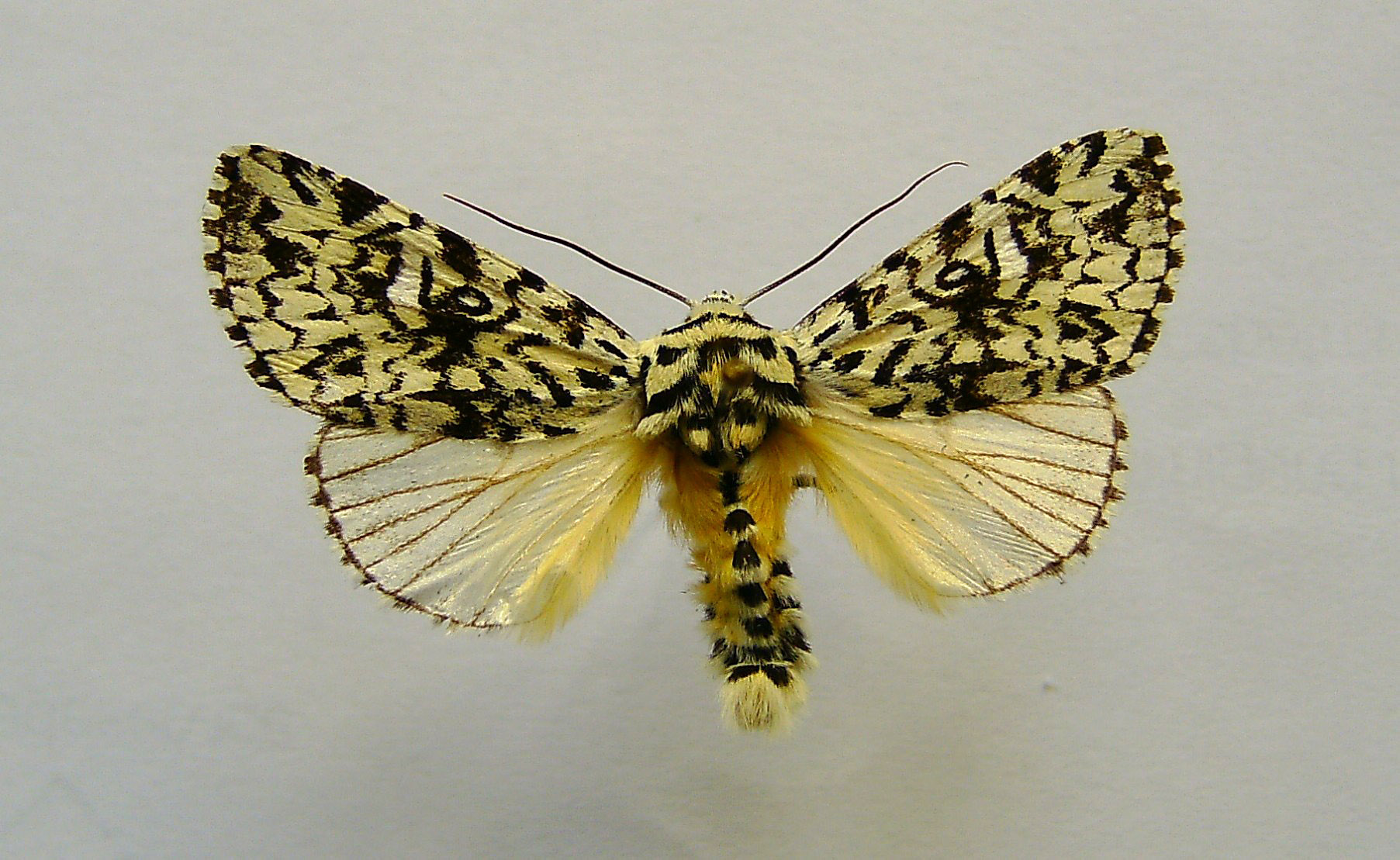

Scientific classification
- Kingdom: Animalia
- Phylum: Arthropoda
- Class: Insecta
- Order: Lepidoptera
- Superfamily: Noctuoidea
- Family: Noctuidae
- Genus: Trichosea
- Species: T. ludifica

Binomial name
- Trichosea ludifica (Linnaeus, 1758)

= Trichosea ludifica =

Species of moth

Trichosea ludifica is a moth of the family Noctuidae. The species was first described by Carl Linnaeus in his 1758 10th edition of Systema Naturae. It is the type species of the genus Trichosea. It is found in the mountainous areas of central Europe, especially in western and northern Germany and the Bavarian Alps.

The wingspan is 42–50 mm. The moths are on wing from May to June and again from August to September depending on the location.

The larvae feed on Betula and Crataegus species, as well as Malus domestica and Sorbus aucuparia.
