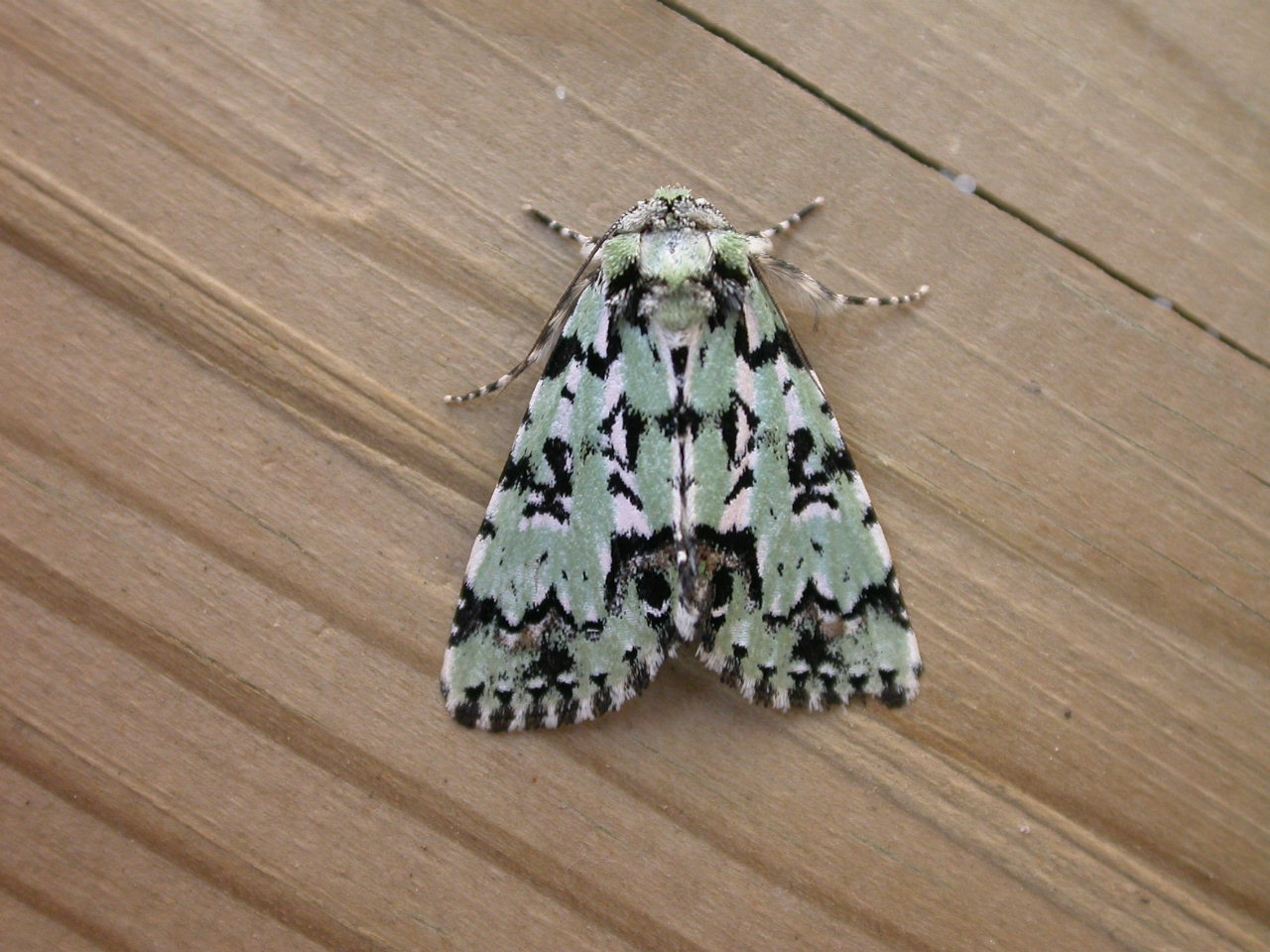

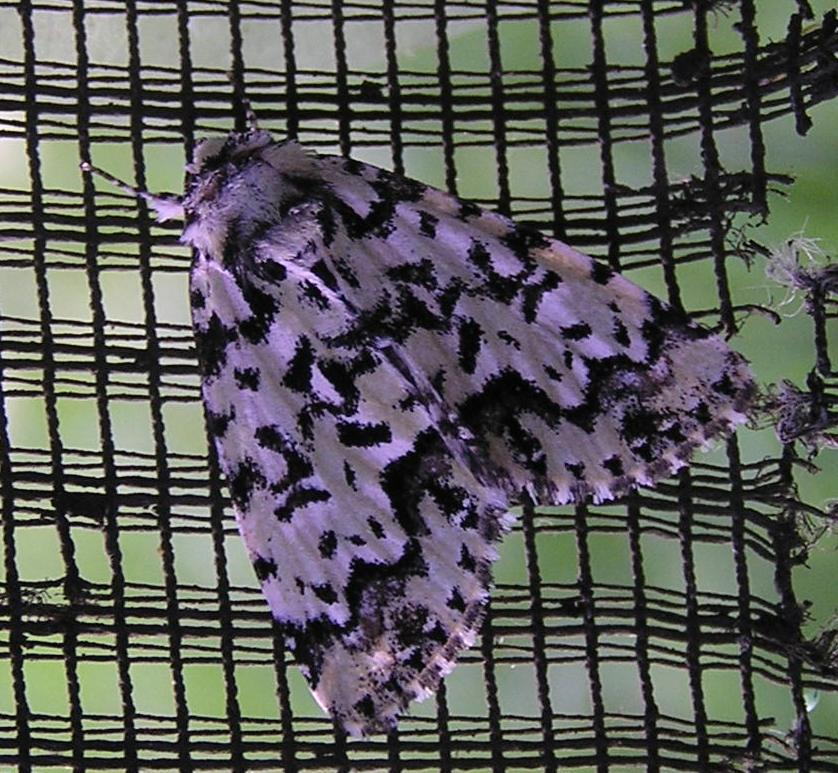

Scientific classification
- Domain: Eukaryota
- Kingdom: Animalia
- Phylum: Arthropoda
- Class: Insecta
- Order: Lepidoptera
- Superfamily: Noctuoidea
- Family: Noctuidae
- Genus: Moma
- Species: M. alpium

Binomial name
- Moma alpium (Osbeck, 1778)

= Moma alpium =

Scarce merveille du jour

Species of moth

Moma alpium, the scarce merveille du jour, is a moth of the family Noctuidae. It is found in the Palearctic realm.

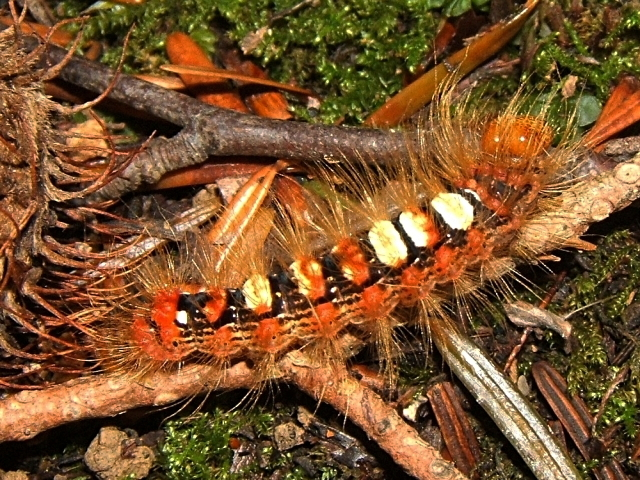
Larva

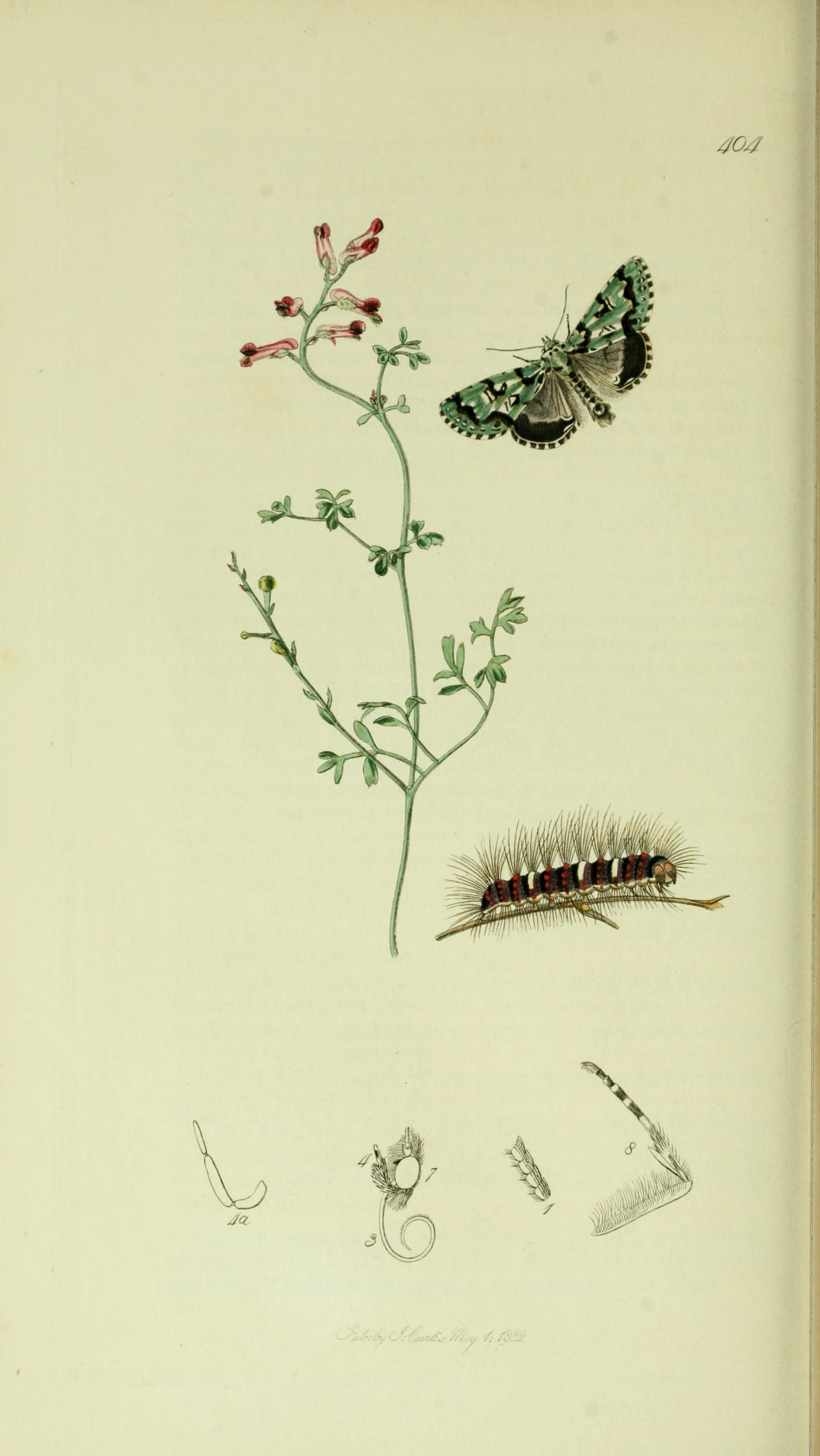
Illustration from John Curtis's British Entomology Volume 5

== Technical description and variation ==
D. alpium Osb. (= orion Esp.) (2c). Forewing blue green, the costa and both folds white: stigmata and lines black; outer hue with brown outer border; hindwing fuscous, with black and white marks at anal angle. In the form murrhina Grues. (2c), from Western Asia, the green of the forewing is much more broken up by black markings between the lines, and the brown shade beyond outer line is wider and extends into the fringe. The examples from Japan are as large as European, those from Korea decidedly smaller. Larva pale brown streaked with yellow; dorsum black with three transverse yellowish white blotches; tubercles reddish, bearing erect tufts of hairs.

== Biology ==
The wingspan is 30–35 mm. The moth flies from May to September depending on the location.

The larvae feed on oak, European beech and birch.
