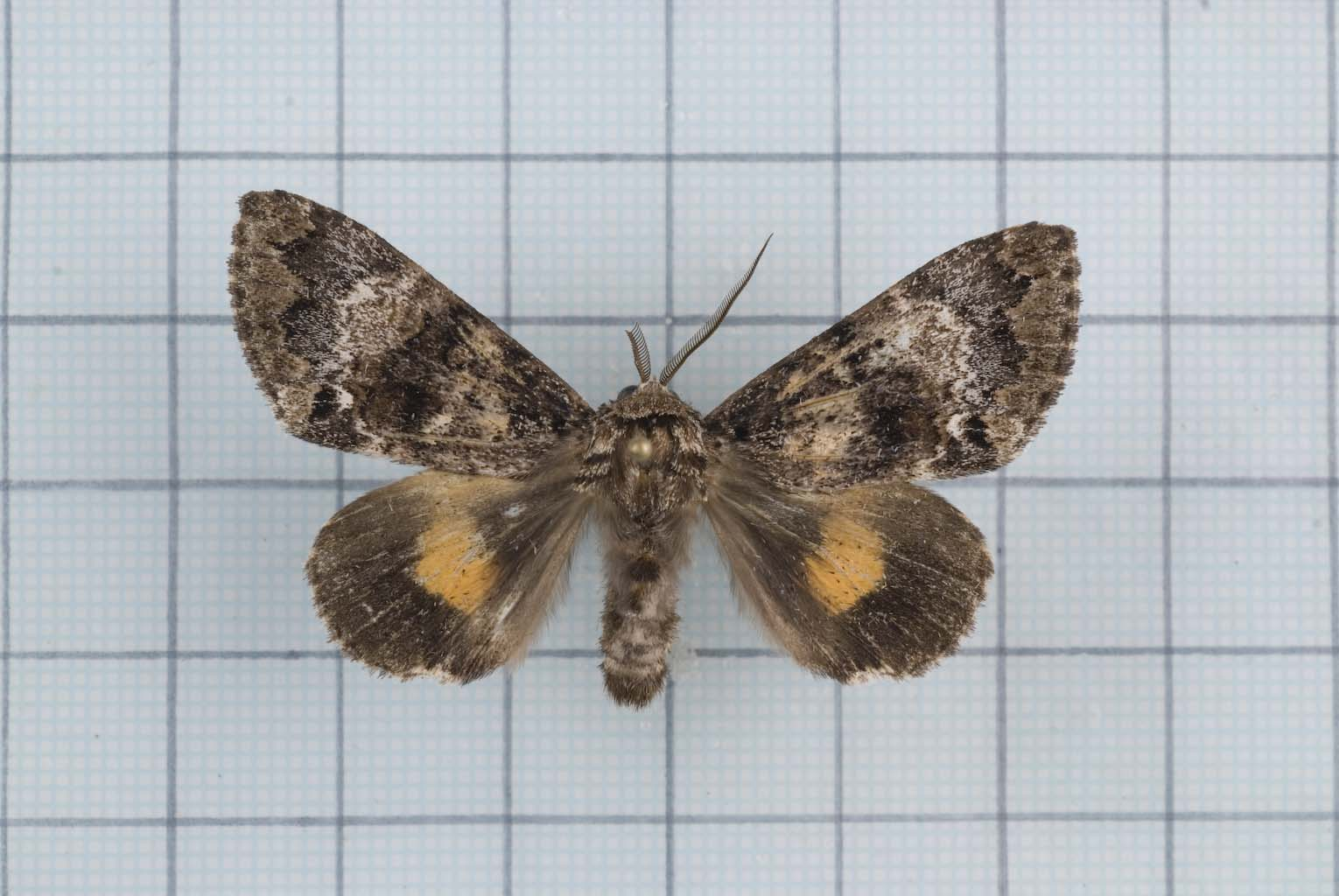
- Trisuloides sericea

Scientific classification
- Domain: Eukaryota
- Kingdom: Animalia
- Phylum: Arthropoda
- Class: Insecta
- Order: Lepidoptera
- Superfamily: Noctuoidea
- Family: Noctuidae
- Subfamily: Pantheinae
- Genus: Trisuloides; Butler, 1881

Synonyms
- Smilepholcia A.E. Prout, 1924

= Trisuloides =

Genus of moths

Trisuloides is a genus of moths of the family Noctuidae.

== Species ==
- Trisuloides becheri H.L. Han, Behounek & Kononenko, 2011
- Trisuloides catocalina Moore, 1883
- Trisuloides papuensis Warren, 1912
- Trisuloides prosericea H.L. Han, Behounek & Kononenko, 2011
- Trisuloides rotundipennis Sugi, 1976
- Trisuloides sericea Butler, 1881
- Trisuloides taiwana Sugi, 1976
- Trisuloides xizanga H.L. Han, Behounek & Kononenko, 2011
- Trisuloides zhangi Y.X. Chen, 1994
