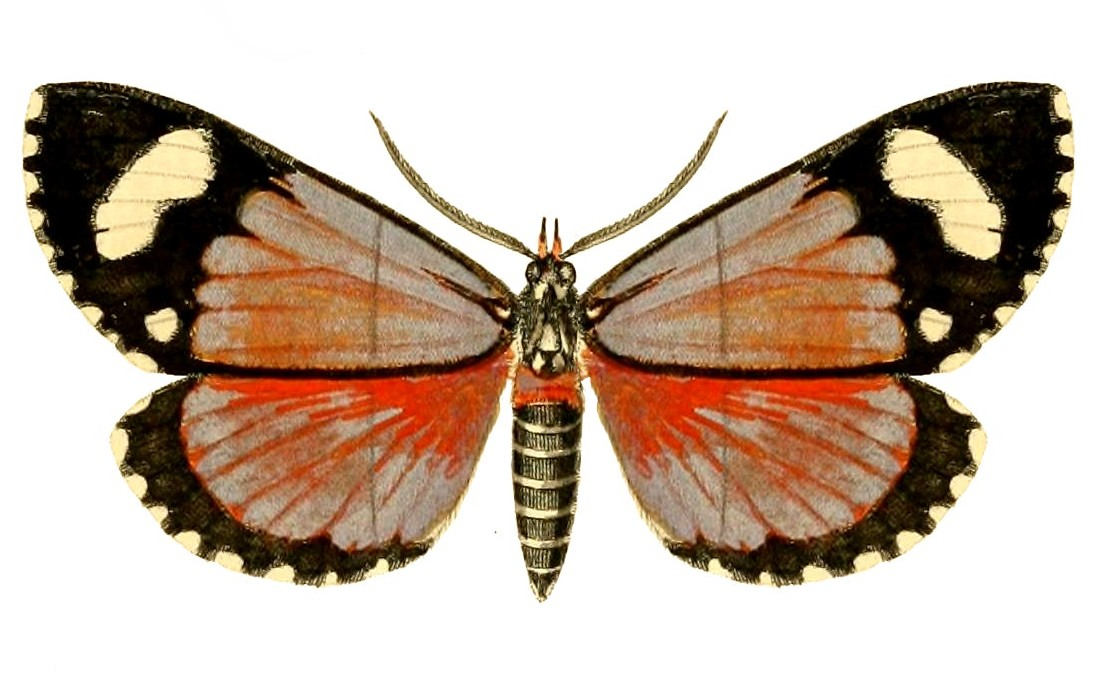

Scientific classification
- Kingdom: Animalia
- Phylum: Arthropoda
- Clade: Pancrustacea
- Class: Insecta
- Order: Lepidoptera
- Superfamily: Noctuoidea
- Family: Erebidae
- Genus: Phaegorista
- Species: P. similis

Binomial name
- Phaegorista similis Walker, 1869

Synonyms
- Phaegorista helcitoides Dewitz, 1879

= Phaegorista similis =

Species of moth

Phaegorista similis is a species of moth in the family Erebidae. It is found in Africa, including Zaire and Angola. It was first introduced by entomologist Francis Walker.
