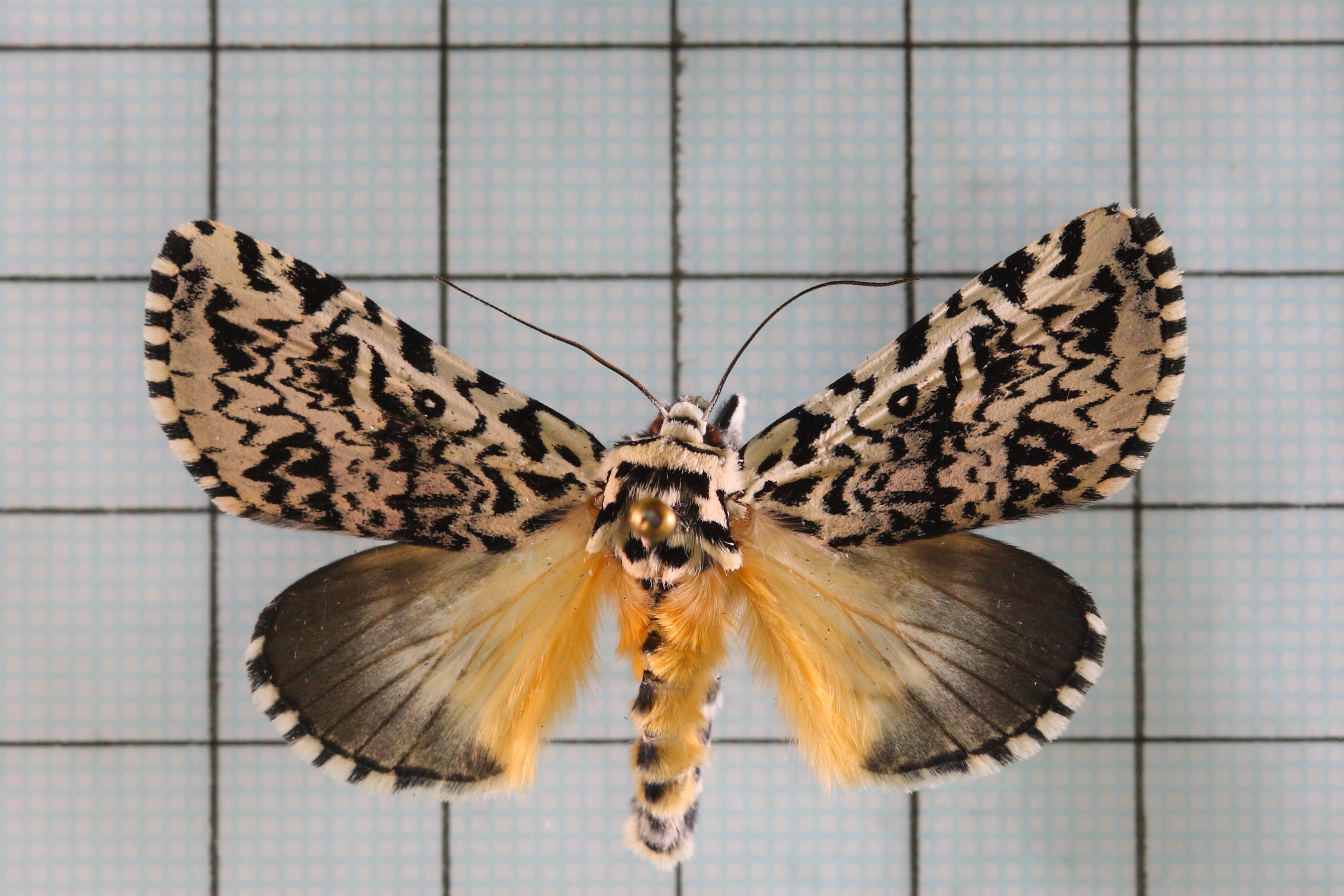

Scientific classification
- Kingdom: Animalia
- Phylum: Arthropoda
- Clade: Pancrustacea
- Class: Insecta
- Order: Lepidoptera
- Superfamily: Noctuoidea
- Family: Noctuidae
- Genus: Trichosea
- Species: T. champa

Binomial name
- Trichosea champa (Moore, 1879)

Synonyms
- Moma champa Moore, 1879

= Trichosea champa =

Species of moth

Trichosea champa is a moth of the family Noctuidae first described by Frederic Moore in 1879. It is found in the Himalayas, north-east India, Sri Lanka, China, Taiwan, Japan, and Russia.

== Description ==
The wingspan is about 56 mm in the female and 44 mm in the male. In the male, the antennae are simple. Head and thorax white. The third joint of palpi, a spot between antennae, and antennae except basal part of shaft are all black. Thorax banded and spotted with black. Abdomen yellow with white extremity. A dorsal series of black spots and ventral series of bands present. Forewings whitish with some black marks near base. There are about seven prominent ill-defined waved and dentate black lines. A ring spot is found at the end of the cell. Hindwings are whitish, with yellow hairs in inner area. Veins are black. Apex slightly suffused with fuscous. Cilia in both wings are black and white checkered. Female is similar to male, but outer area of hindwings are black suffused.

The larvae feed on Pyrus communis.
