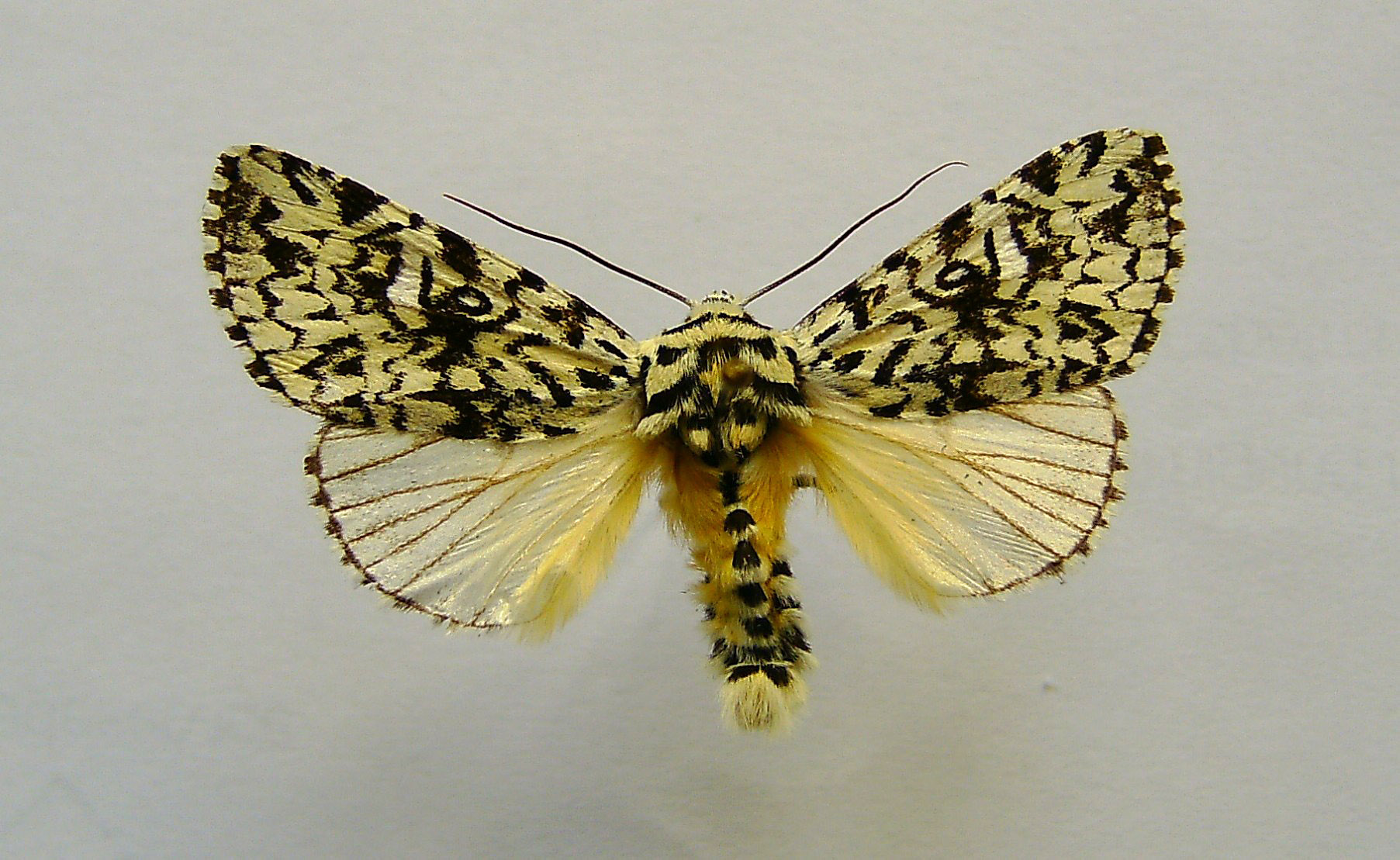
- Trichosea ludifica

Scientific classification
- Kingdom: Animalia
- Phylum: Arthropoda
- Class: Insecta
- Order: Lepidoptera
- Superfamily: Noctuoidea
- Family: Noctuidae
- Subfamily: Pantheinae
- Genus: Trichosea; Grote, 1875

= Trichosea =

Genus of moths

Trichosea is a genus of moths of the family Noctuidae.

== Species ==
The following species are assigned to this genus:

- Trichosea androdes Prout, 1924
- Trichosea champa Moore, 1879
- Trichosea diffusa Sugi, 1986
- Trichosea hoenei Draudt, 1950
- Trichosea leucotaenia Prout, 1924
- Trichosea ludifica (Linnaeus, 1758)
- Trichosea mjobergi (Prout, 1926)
- Trichosea nigrescens Warren, 1912
- Trichosea nigricatena Prout, 1922
- Trichosea taikoshonis Matsumura, 1929
- Trichosea tamsi Prout, 1924
