= Philogène Wytsman =

Belgian ornithologist, entomologist and publisher

Philogène Auguste Galilée Wytsman (12 August 1866 – 1 March 1925) was a Belgian ornithologist, entomologist and publisher most noted for his serial publications Genera Avium and Genera Insectorum.

26 issues of Genera Avium were published between 1905 and 1914. These were written by leading European and British ornithologists. Wytsman himself authored the second family, the Todidae.

Genera Insectorum was another multi-authored series begun in 1902. This consisted of 219 issues, the last occurring in 1970.
