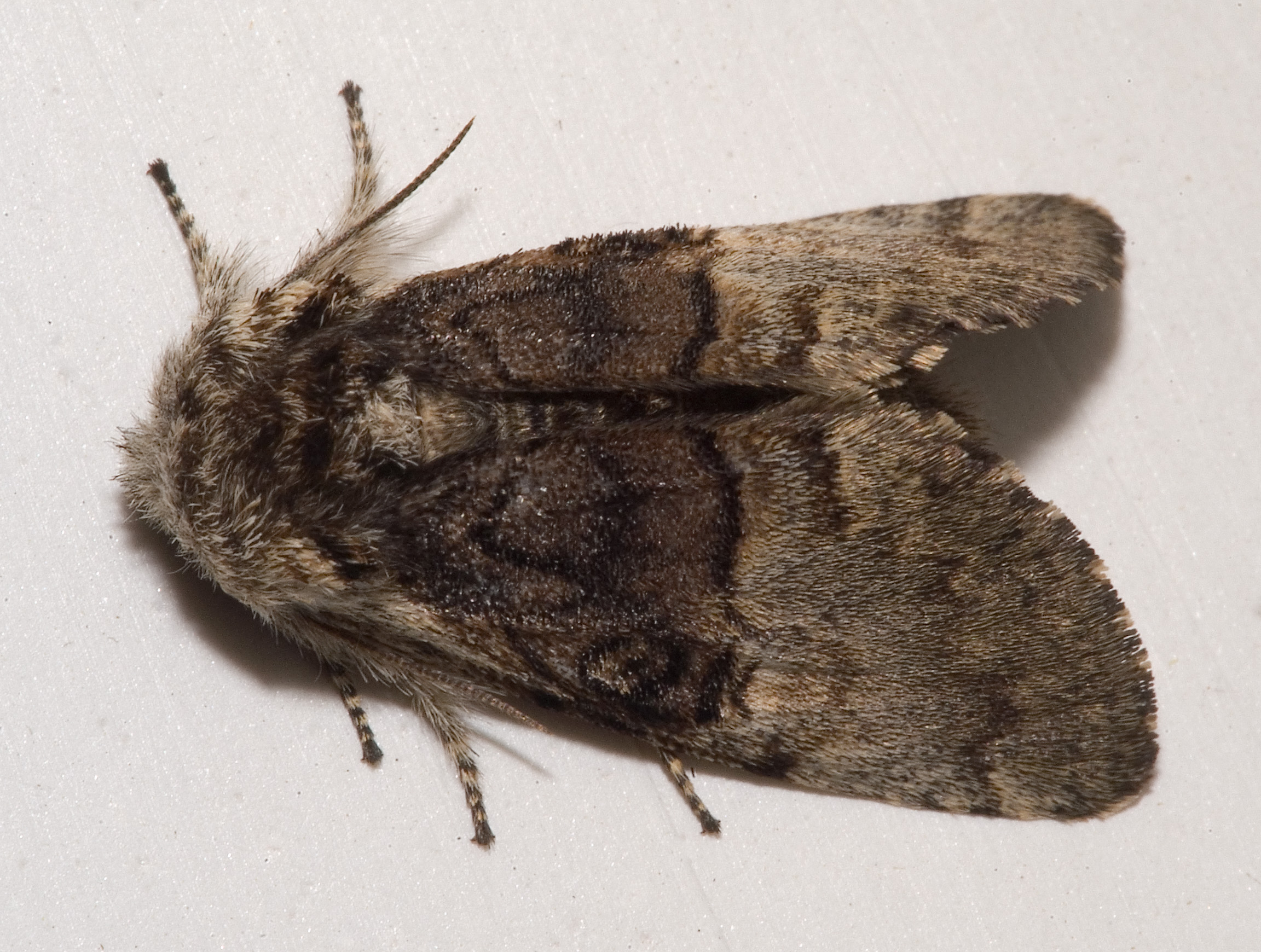

Scientific classification
- Kingdom: Animalia
- Phylum: Arthropoda
- Clade: Pancrustacea
- Class: Insecta
- Order: Lepidoptera
- Superfamily: Noctuoidea
- Family: Noctuidae
- Genus: Colocasia
- Species: C. coryli

Binomial name
- Colocasia coryli (Linnaeus, 1758)

= Colocasia coryli =

Nut-tree tussock

Species of moth

Colocasia coryli (nut-tree tussock) is a moth of the family Noctuidae. It is found in Europe and Asia. In the north of its range, the distribution area includes northern Scandinavia, while in the south the moth is limited to montane areas of western and northern Spain, Sicily, Greece, Romania and Asia minor. To the east, the range extends across the Palearctic to Lake Baikal. In the Alps it is found at elevations up to 1600 m.

== Description ==
The wingspan is 27–35 mm. The ground colour of the forewings is variable silver to brownish grey. The basal area of the forewing is darker as far as the median field then paler in the distal field. Antemedian and postmedian lines are both black. The stigmata are round and outlined in black sometimes white in the centre. The fringe is chequered brown and grey. The hindwings are pale fuscous with darker veining. "Forewing pearly grey, tinged with brown; lines blackish, vertical; space between them often dark brown. The form mus Oberth. from Amurland has the ground colour more bluish grey." The larva is ochreous, with grey hairs; dorsal line dark, with two long projecting pencils of black hairs from segment 2 and one from segment 12, two reddish brown erect tufts on segments 5 and 6.

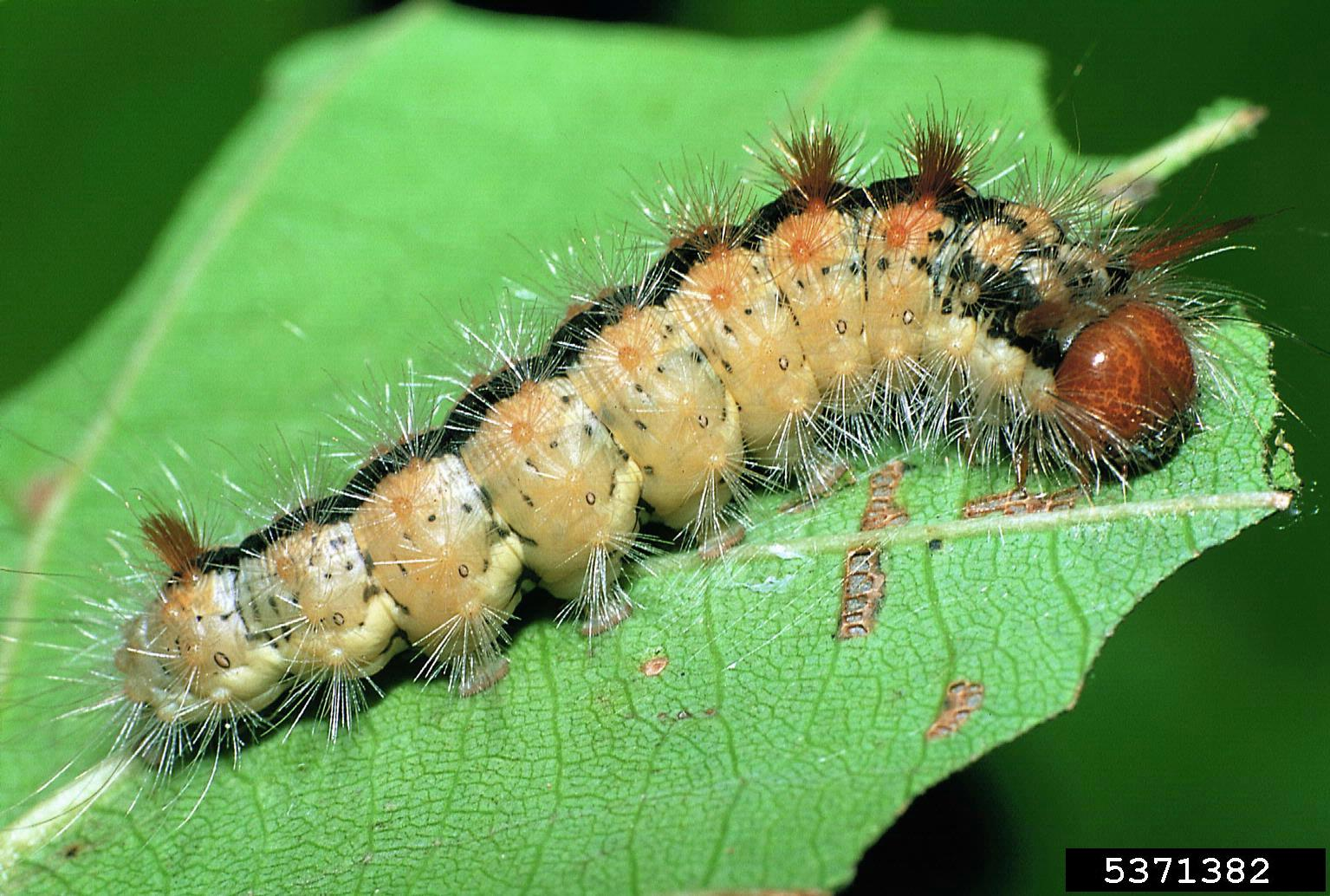
Larva

== Biology ==
The moth is bivoltine in southern Britain, on the wing April - June and July - September, but univoltine in the north, on the wing May - June. In Europe the larvae feed on hazel, oak, beech, hornbeam, birch and field maple.
