= Louis Beethoven Prout =

English entomologist and musicologist

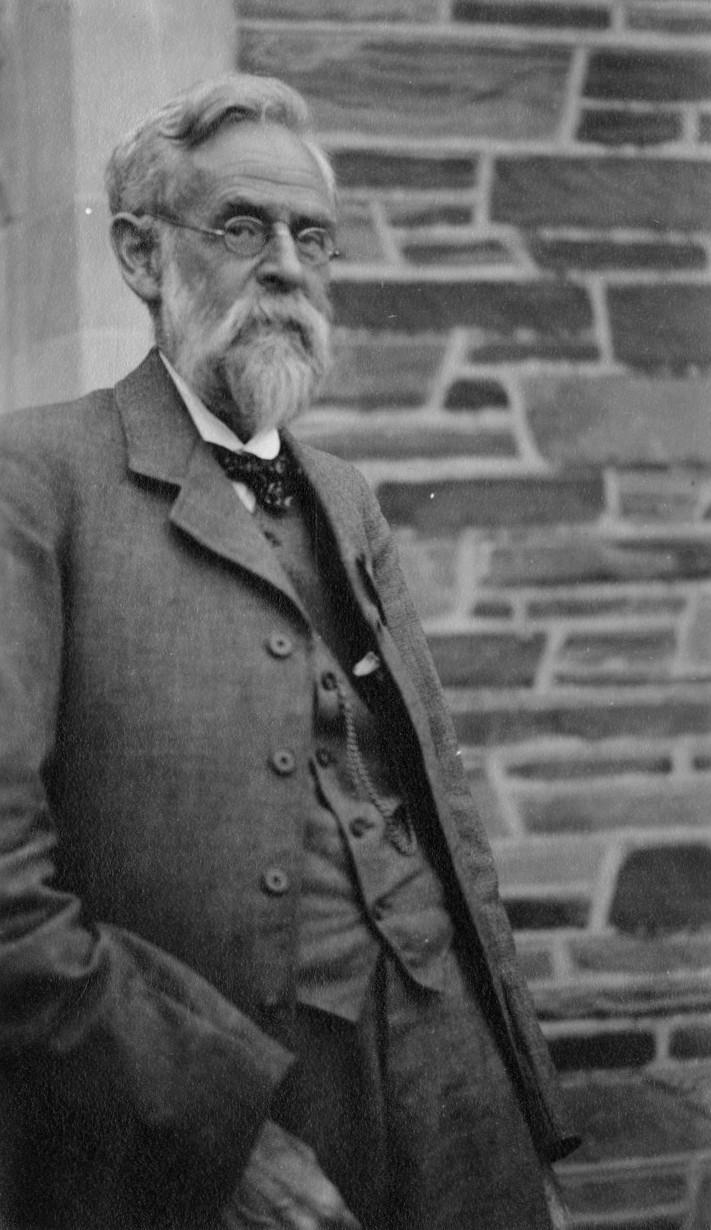
Louis Beethoven Prout.

Louis Beethoven Prout (1864–1943) was an English entomologist, and musicologist.

Prout specialised in the insect order of Lepidoptera, especially the Geometridae, or geometer moths, on which he was a foremost authority. He contributed the sections on geometer moths in Philogène Wytsman's Genera Insectorum, and in The Macrolepidoptera of the World, the English-language version of Adalbert Seitz's Die Gross-Schmetterlinge der Erde. Prout's notebooks and publications formed the basis of the Geometridae card indexes in the Natural History Museum, the then British Museum (Natural History). He was the secretary of the North London Natural History Society, and worked in association with the Natural History Museum at Tring.

He is not to be confused with his sister, Alice Ellen Prout, who was a fellow of the Entomological Society of London. Prout was the son of composer Ebenezer Prout, and a noted musicologist.

== Works ==
Selected works include:

- 1910. "Lepidoptera Heterocera, Fam. Geometridae, Subfam. Oenochrominae". Genera Insectorum. 104.
- 1911a. "New species of Geometridae". Annals and Magazine of Natural History. (8) 8 (48): 702–711.
- 1911b. "New species of Hemitheinae (Geometrinae auct.)". The Entomologist. 44: 26–28.
- 1911c. "New African Geometridae". The Entomologist. 44: 292–295.
- 1912–16. "Geometridae". In A. Seitz (ed.) The Macrolepidoptera of the World. The Palaearctic Geometridae. 4. Alfred Kernen, Stuttgart.
- 1912a. "Geometridae: Brephinae, Oenochrominae". Lepidopterorum Catalogus. 8.
- 1912b. "Lepidoptera Heterocera fam. Geometridae Subfam. Hemitheinae". Genera Insectorum. 129.
- 1913a. "Contributions to a knowledge of the subfamilies Oenochromidnae and Hemitheinae of Geometridae". Novitates Zoologicae. 20 (2): 388–44
- 1913b. "New South African Geometridae". Annals of the Transvaal Museum. 3 (4): 194–225.
- 1913c. "Geometridae: Subfamily Hemitheinae". Lepidopterorum Catalogus. 14.
- 1915. "New genera and species of African Geometridae". Novitates Zoologicae. 22: 311–385.
- 1916a. "New South African Geometridae". Annals of the Transvaal Museum. 5 (3): 151–179, pl. 25.
- 1916b. "Geometridae". In E. B. Poulton, "On a collection of moths made in Somaliland by Mr. W. Feather". Proceedings of the Zoological Society of London. 1916 (1): 91–182, pls. 1–2.
- 1916c. "New African Geometridae". Novitates Zoologicae. 23: 272–286.
- 1917a. "New Geometridae (Lepidoptera) in the South African Museum". Annals of the South African Museum. 17 (1): 47–77.
- 1917b. "New Geometridae in the Joicey collection". Annals and Magazine of Natural History. (8) 20 (115): 108–128, pl. 7. [See James John Joicey.)
- 1917c. "New African Geometridae". Novitates Zoologicae. 24: 428–436.
- 1918a. "New Lepidoptera in the Joicey collection". Annals and Magazine of Natural History. (9) 1 (1): 18–32, 312–318.
- 1918b. "New Lepidoptera in the Joicey collection". Annals and Magazine of Natural History. (9) 2 (11): 412–418.
- 1919a. "New and insufficiently-known moths in the Joicey collection". Annals and Magazine of Natural History. (9) 3 (14): 165–190.
- 1919b. "New Species and forms in the Joicey Collection". Annals and Magazine of Natural History. (9) 4 (22): 277–282.
- 1920a. "New Geometridae". Novitates Zoologicae. 27: 265–312.
- 1920b. "New moths in the Joicey collection". Annals and Magazine of Natural History. (9) 5 :286–293.
- 1921a. "New Lepidoptera collected by Mr. T. A. Barns. IV. New Geometridae". Bulletin of the Hill Museum. 1: 138–157, pl. 18. (See T. A. Barns.)
- 1921b. "Notes on some Noctuidae in the Joicey collection with descriptions of new species". Annals and Magazine of Natural History. (9) 8: 1–66, pls. 1–7.
- 1922a. "New and little-known Geometridae". Novitates Zoologicae. 29: 327–363
- 1922b. "Some new Geometridae and Dioptidae in the Joicey collection". Bulletin of the Hill Museum. 1 (2): 252–26.
- 1922c. "New South African Heterocera". Annals of the Transvaal Museum. 8 (3): 149–186, pl. 1.
- 1923. "New Geometridae in the Tring Museum". Novitates Zoologicae. 30 (2): 191–215.
- 1925a. "Geometrid descriptions and notes". Novitates Zoologicae. 32: 31–69.
- 1925b. "New Geometridae in the collection of the Deutsches Ent. Institut (Lep.)". Entomologische Mitteilungen. 14: 309–312.
- 1925c. "New Geometridae from Madagascar in the collection of Sir H. Kenrick". Transactions of the Entomological Society of London. 1925 (1–2): 301–319, pl. 38.
- 1925d. "New species of Geometridae (Lepidoptera) in the collections of the South African Museum". Annals of the South African Museum. 19 (4): 579–600, pls. 16–17.
- 1926a. "New Geometridae". Novitates Zoologicae. 33 (1): 1–32.
- 1926b. "Zoological results of the Swedish expedition to Central Africa 1911. Insecta. 20. Lepidoptera. Geometridae". Arkiv för Zoologi. 18A (25): 1–17.
- 1926c. "New Geometridae in the Tring Museum". Novitates Zoologicae. 33: 179–188.
- 1928. "Nouvelles Geometridae africaines de la collection Audeoud". Bulletin de la Société des Lépidoptéristes de Genève. 6: 19–32, pl.
- 1929a. "On the geometrid genus Catoria Moore". Novitates Zoologicae. 35: 132–141.
- 1929b. "A revision of the Indo-Australian Cleora of the alienaria group". Bulletin of the Hill Museum. Witley, 3: 179–222.
- 1929–1938. "Die Spannerartigen Nachtfalter (Geometridae)". In: Seitz, A. (ed.) Die Gross-Schmetterlinge der Erde. 16: 1–160.
- 1932a. "Voyage de Ch. Alluaud et R. Jeannel en Afrique Orientale (1911–1912). Insectes Lép.. III. Geometridae". Mémoires de la Société zoologique de France. 29 (5): 375–512.
- 1932b. "New Geometridae from Congo Belge". Revue de Zoologie et Botanique Africaines. 21: 241–250.
- 1932c. "New genera and species of Sterrhinae (Fam. Geometridae)". Novitates Zoologicae. 37: 229–251.
- 1932d. "The Lepidopterous Genus Nobilia (Geometridae)". Novitates Zoologicae. 38 (1): 1-6.
- 1932e. "On the Geometridae of the expedition of Ch. Alluaud and R. Jeannel to Central Africa". Novitates Zoologicae. 38 (1): 11–12.
- 1932f. "New exotic Geometridae". Novitates Zoologicae. 38 (1): 103–12.
- 1934. "New species and subspecies of Geometridae". Novitates Zoologicae. 39 (2): 99–136.
- 1934–35 "Geometridae: Subfamilia Sterrhinae. 3 parts". Lepidopterorum Catalogus. 61, 63 (1934), 68 (1935).
- 1937. "A revision of the decisaria group of Cleora". Novitates Zoologicae. 40: 190–198.
- 1958. "New species of Indo-Australian Geometridae". Bulletin of the British Museum (Natural History) Entomology. 6 (12): 365-463.
