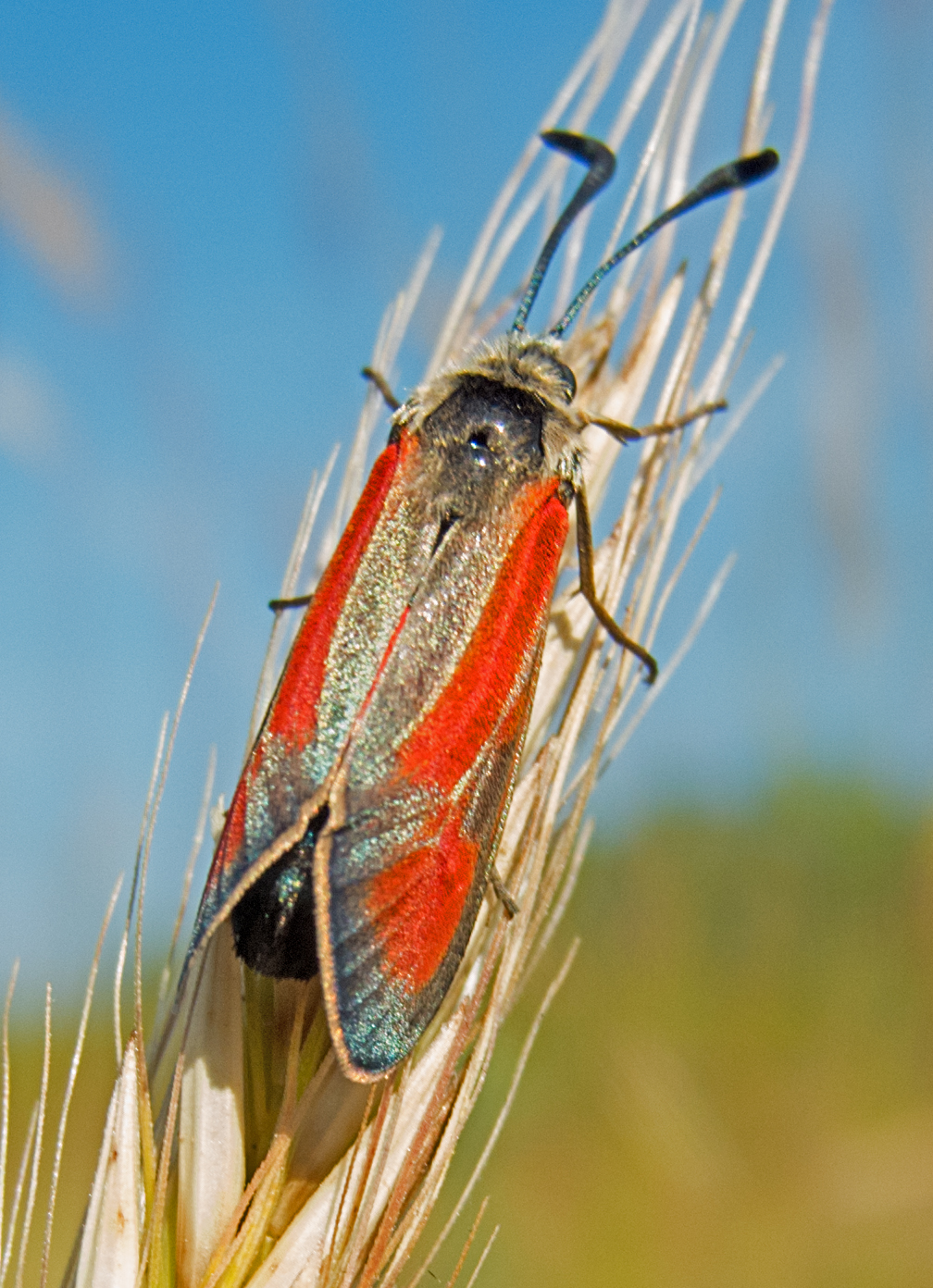

Scientific classification
- Domain: Eukaryota
- Kingdom: Animalia
- Phylum: Arthropoda
- Class: Insecta
- Order: Lepidoptera
- Family: Zygaenidae
- Genus: Zygaena
- Species: Z. punctum

Binomial name
- Zygaena punctum Ochsenheimer, 1808

Synonyms
- Zygaena ledereri Rambur, 1866; Zygaena isaszeghensis Reiss, 1929; Zygaena kolbi Reiss, 1933; Zygaena dalmatina Boisduval, 1834; Zygaena athenae Reiss, 1933; Zygaena dystrepta Fischer von Waldheim, 1832; Zygaena cheronesica Reiss, 1941; Zygaena kefersteinii Herrich-Schäffer, 1846; Zygaena rhodosica Reiss, 1962; Zygaena anatoliensis Reiss, 1962; Zygaena vanica G. & H. Reiss, 1973

= Zygaena punctum =

Species of moth

Zygaena punctum is a species of moth in the family Zygaenidae. It is found in Poland, the Czech Republic, Slovakia, Austria, Slovenia, Italy, the Balkan Peninsula, Moldova, Ukraine, Russia and Turkey.

== Technical description and variation (Seitz) ==
Z. punctum O. Represents the preceding African insect [ Zygaena favonia Frr.] in the South of Europe. Position of the red spots as in Zygaena sarpedon, but the apical spot enlarged, appearing washed out, being deeper red centrally and pale at the edges. Red abdominal belt always absent. Name-typical punctum occurs at the north-east coasts of the Mediterranean Sea, as far as Armenia; small, the markings of forewing more or less confluent, the hindmargin remaining broadly black. — In dystrepta Fisch.-Wald. [ now Zygaena punctum dystrepta Fischer de Waldheim, 1832], from S. E. Europe and Asia Minor, the hindmargin is only very narrowly shaded with black, the forewing being otherwise all blood-red except distal margin; this colour replaced by miniate [red lead or vermilion] in a specimen from Asia Minor received from Messrs. Staudinger and Bang-Haas under the name of malatina — italica Stgr.-Reb. [italica Stgr.-Reb. now a synonym of punctum] is a more densely scaled and therefore brighter coloured form from South and Central Italy, the apical patch being distinctly separated from the basal area by a narrow black interspace, while in the much larger contamineoides Stgr. (= contaminei Zell, dalmatina H.-Sch.) [ now Z. punctum ssp. ledereri Rambur, 1858 ], from Spain, Italy, and Sicily, a broad interspace isolates the apical spot completely. — Larva greenish, with white dorsal line and subdorsal rows of black dots, below which there are larger yellow spots. Head and thoracical legs black, abdominal legs yellow; in May and June on Eryngium. The imago in July at very limited localities, but rather common, flying low. The wingspan is 25–30 mm.

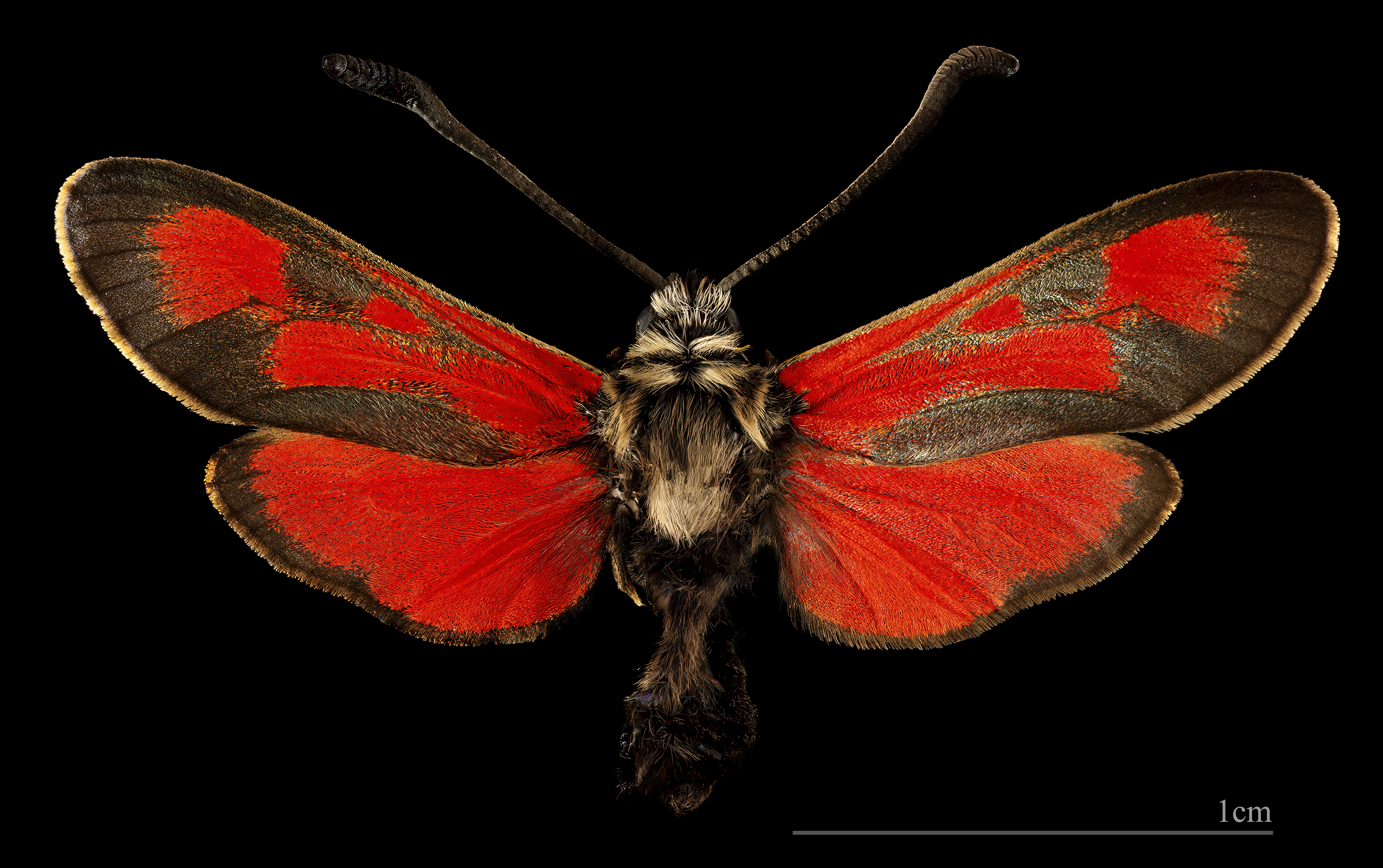
♀

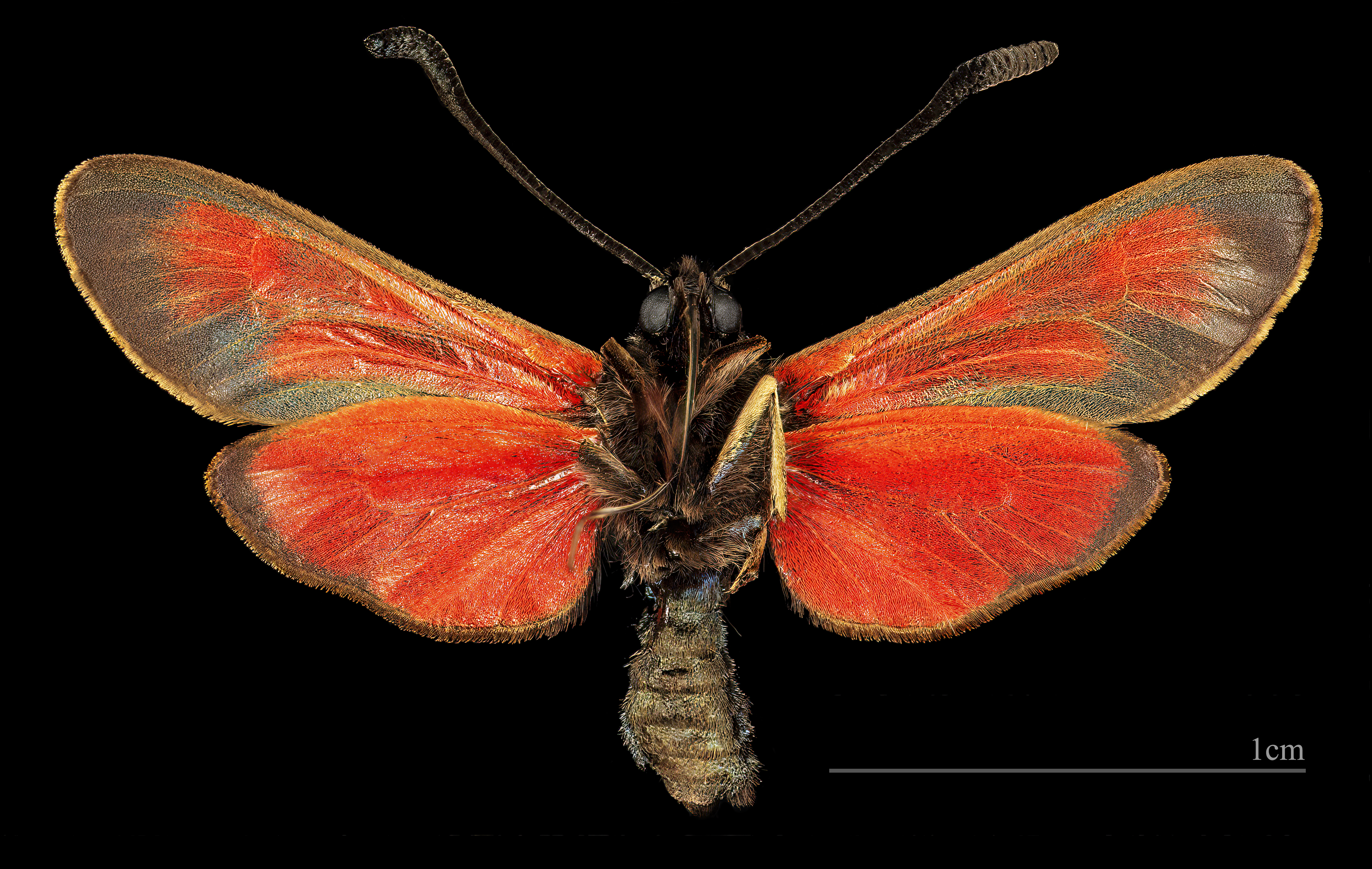
♀ △

== Biology ==
Adults are on wing from the end of May to July.

The larvae feed on Eryngium species. The species overwinters in the larval stage. Full-grown larvae can be found in May.

== Subspecies ==
- Zygaena punctum punctum
- Zygaena punctum dalmatina Boisduval, 1834
- Zygaena punctum dystrepta Fischer de Waldheim, 1832
- Zygaena punctum itala Burgeff, 1926
- Zygaena punctum kalavrytica Reiss, 1962
- Zygaena punctum kefersteinii Herrich-Schaffer, 1846
- Zygaena punctum ledereri Rambur, 1858
- Zygaena punctum malatina Dziurzynski, 1903

== Bibliography ==
- Šašić, Martina; Nahirnić, Ana; Tarmann, Gerhard M. (2016-12-31). "Zygaenidae (Lepidoptera) in the Lepidoptera collections of the Croatian Natural History Museum". Natura Croatica: Periodicum Musei Historiae Naturalis Croatici. 25 (2): 233–248. doi:10.20302/NC.2016.25.19. eISSN 1848-7386.
