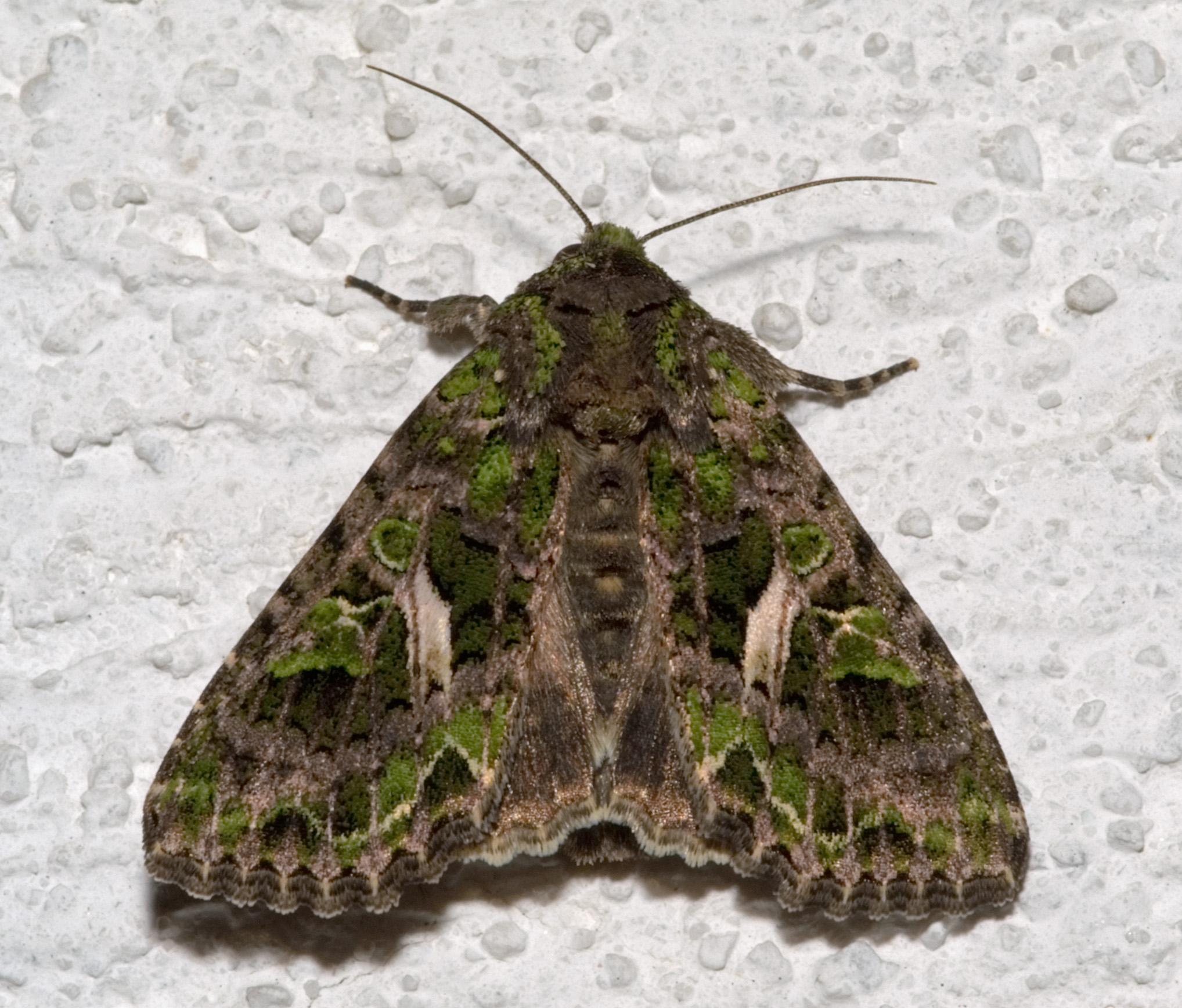
- Trachea atriplicis

Scientific classification
- Domain: Eukaryota
- Kingdom: Animalia
- Phylum: Arthropoda
- Class: Insecta
- Order: Lepidoptera
- Superfamily: Noctuoidea
- Family: Noctuidae
- Tribe: Dypterygiini
- Genus: Trachea; Ochsenheimer, 1816

= Trachea (moth) =

Genus of moths

Trachea is a genus of moths of the family Noctuidae erected by Ferdinand Ochsenheimer in 1816.

== Species ==
- Trachea altivolans Schaus, 1911
- Trachea anguliplaga (Walker, 1858)
- Trachea atriplaga Hampson, 1911
- Trachea atriplicis (Linnaeus, 1758) – orache moth
- Trachea atritornea Hampson, 1908
- Trachea aurigera (Walker, 1858)
- Trachea auriplena (Walker, 1857)
- Trachea belastigma Hreblay & Ronkay, 1998
- Trachea bipectinata Berio, 1977
- Trachea brunneicosta Joicey & Talbot, 1915
- Trachea cavagnaroi Hayes, 1975
- Trachea chloodes Zerny, 1916
- Trachea chlorochrysa Berio, 1937
- Trachea confluens (Moore, 1881)
- Trachea conjuncta Wileman, 1914
- Trachea delicata (Grote, 1874)
- Trachea espumosa (Dognin, 1897)
- Trachea eugrapha E. D. Jones, 1908
- Trachea euryscia Hampson, 1918
- Trachea guttata (Warren, 1913)
- Trachea jankowskii (Oberthür, 1879)
- Trachea leuchochlora Boursin, 1970
- Trachea leucodonta Hampson, 1908
- Trachea luzonensis Wileman & South, 1920
- Trachea macropthtalma Berio, 1976
- Trachea malezieuxi (Dognin, 1897)
- Trachea mancilla (Schaus, 1921)
- Trachea melanospila Kollar, 1844
- Trachea microspila Hampson, 1908
- Trachea mnionia Dognin, 15
- Trachea nicgrescens Schaus, 1911
- Trachea normalis Hampson, 1914
- Trachea novicia Schaus, 1933
- Trachea oxylus (Fawcett, 1917)
- Trachea paranica Schaus, 1898
- Trachea polychroa Hampson, 1908
- Trachea prasinatra Draudt, 1950
- Trachea punctisigna Dognin, 1914
- Trachea punkikonis Matsumura, 1929
- Trachea stieglmayri Zerny, 1916
- Trachea stoliczkae (Felder & Rogenhofer, 1874)
- Trachea supera Schaus, 1911
- Trachea tessellata (Prout, 1925)
- Trachea tibetensis (Warren, 1912)
- Trachea tokiensis (Butler, 1881)
- Trachea toxaridia (Druce, 1889)
- Trachea uscana (Druce, 1889)
- Trachea viridata Prout, 1922
- Trachea viridis (Druce, 1898)
- Trachea viridisparsa Laporte, 1972
