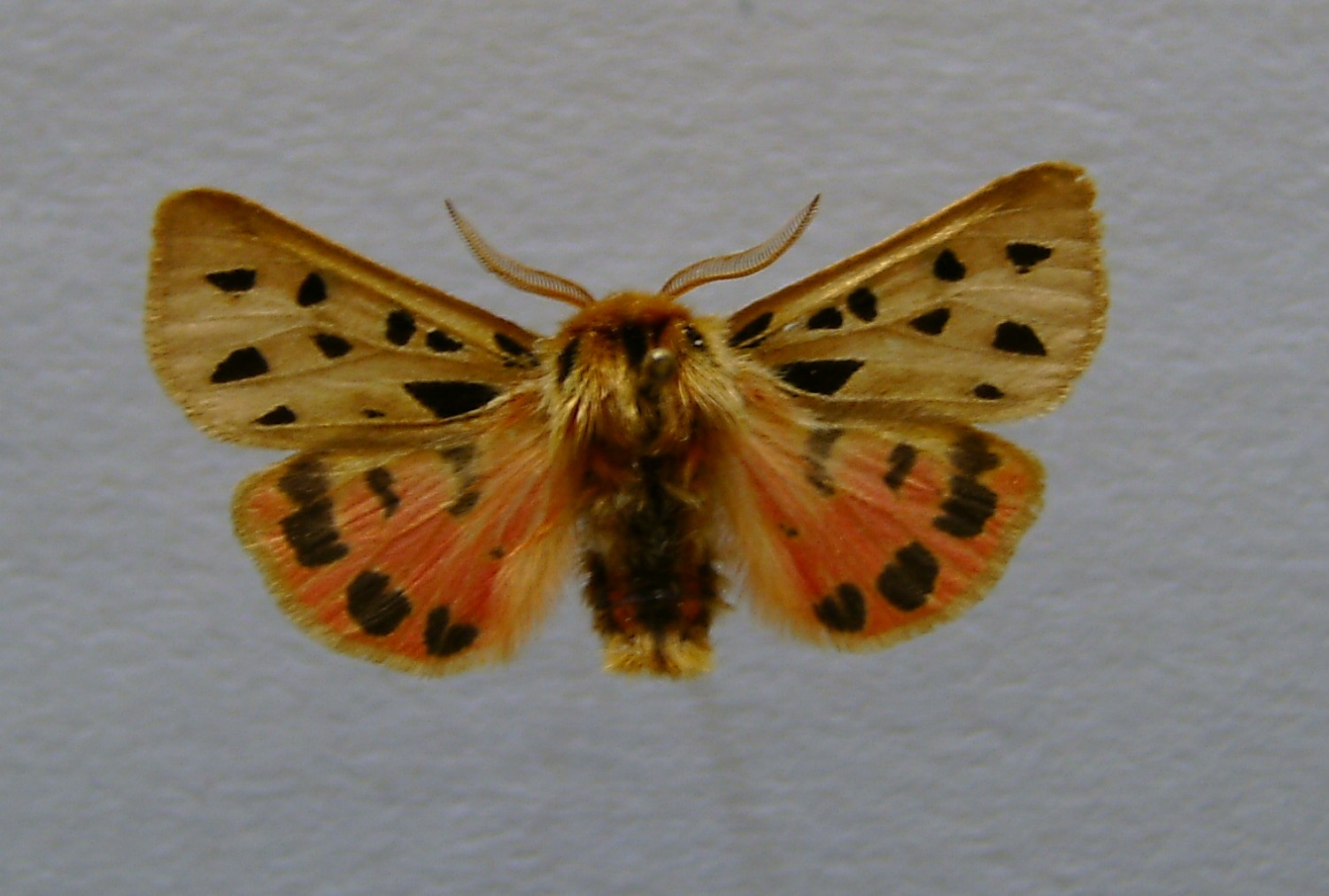

Scientific classification
- Domain: Eukaryota
- Kingdom: Animalia
- Phylum: Arthropoda
- Class: Insecta
- Order: Lepidoptera
- Superfamily: Noctuoidea
- Family: Erebidae
- Subfamily: Arctiinae
- Genus: Chelis
- Species: C. maculosa

Binomial name
- Chelis maculosa (Gerning, 1780)

Synonyms
- Phalaena Bombyx maculosa [Denis & Schiffermüller], 1775; Arctia maculosa monacensis Osthelder, 1933; Chelis maculosa boursini Daniel, 1935; Arctia maculosa var. arragonensis Staudinger, 1894; Chelis maculosa centralhispanica Daniel, 1935; Chelis maculosa serratica Agenjo, 1937; Chelis maculosa arragonensis Staudinger, 1894; Bombyx honesta Tauscher, 1806; Chelonia mannerheimi Duponchel, 1836; Arctia maculosa stertzi Schulz, 1902; Arctia maculosa latina Turati, 1909; Chelis maculosa boursini Daniel, 1935; Chelis maculosa nordiberica Agenjo, 1937; Chelis maculosa arlanzona Agenjo, 1937

= Chelis maculosa =

Species of moth

Chelis maculosa Speckled Pellicle is a tiger moth of the family Erebidae. It is found in Southern and Central Europe up to Hungary, in eastern direction it occurs through Ukraine, Southern Russia, Kazakhstan to north-western regions of Chinese Xinjiang.

The wingspan is 32–34 mm. The moth flies from June to August depending on the location.

The larvae feed on Galium verum and at times also other Galium species.

== Subspecies ==
- Chelis maculosa maculosa
- Chelis maculosa arragonensis (Staudinger, 1894)
- Chelis maculosa honesta (Tauscher, 1806)
- Chelis maculosa stertzi (Schulz, 1902)
