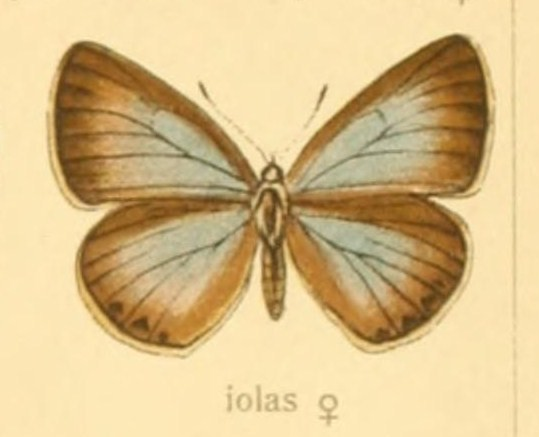
- Female from Adalbert Seitz
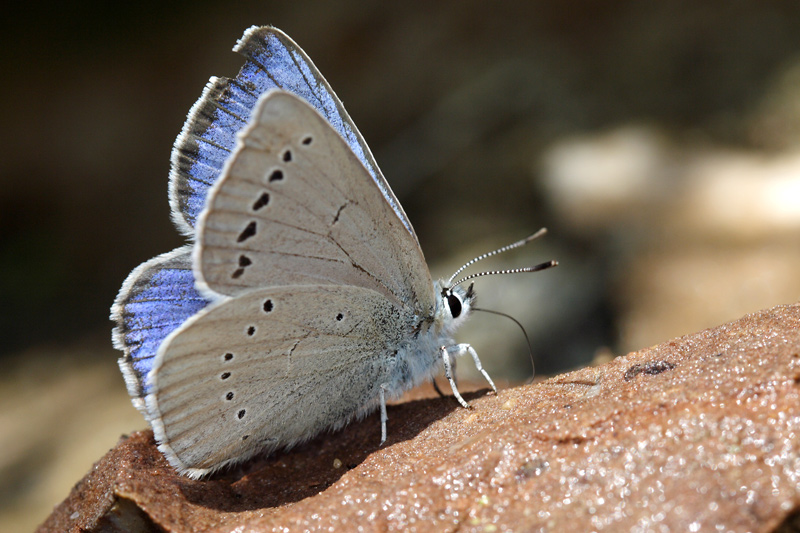

Scientific classification
- Domain: Eukaryota
- Kingdom: Animalia
- Phylum: Arthropoda
- Class: Insecta
- Order: Lepidoptera
- Family: Lycaenidae
- Genus: Iolana
- Species: I. iolas

Binomial name
- Iolana iolas Ochsenheimer, 1816
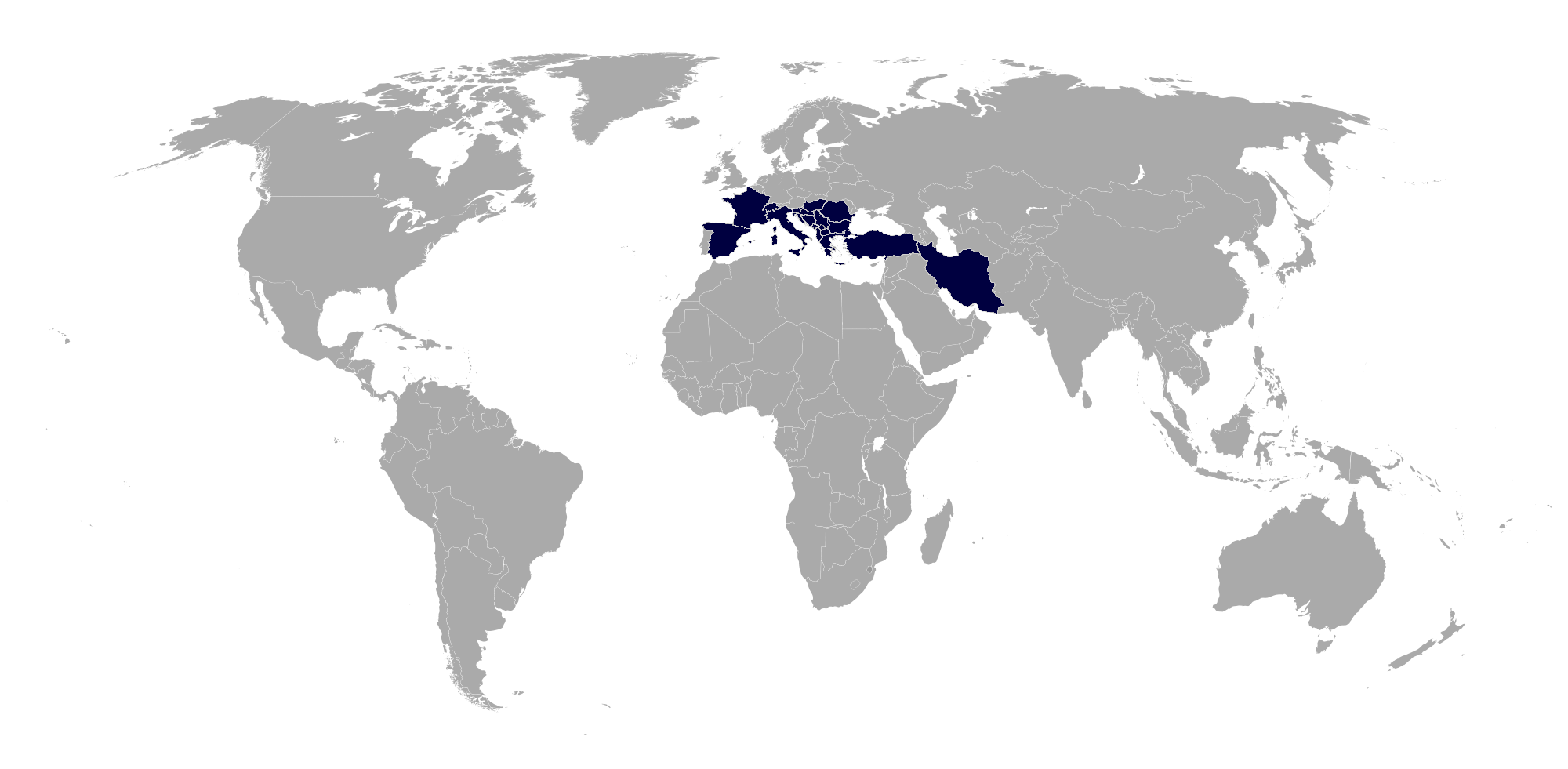
- Distribution

= Iolana iolas =

Iolas blue

Species of butterfly

Iolana iolas, the iolas blue, is a butterfly of the family Lycaenidae. It is found in northern Africa, southern Spain, southern France, southern Europe, Asia Minor and Iran. The wingspan of the male is 18–21 mm (0.71–0.83 in). The flight period is May to June in rocky places at around 2,000 m (6,600 ft). The larva feeds on Colutea arborescens.

== Description from Seitz ==
Male above a magnificent violet- blue, with narrow black border and white fringes. Female with broad black margin to the forewing and large black distal marginal dots to the hindwing. Under- side dust-grey, with feeble blue dusting at the base of the hindwing; besides the discal row of ocelli only the discocellular bar and two basal ocelli to the hindwing are distinct. The ocelli of the discal row are sometimes more strongly developed (ab. opulenta Schultz), sometimes more weakly (ab. debilitata Schultz). — In the South and South East, from Vienna and Hungary southwards to North Africa and eastwards to Persia and Turkestan; also in Spain. Larva in the pods of Colutea arborescens, according to the colour of the pod green, reddish or coffee-brown, with dark dorsal line accompanied on each side by pale-bordered blackish oblique smears; until June and again in the autumn, often in the pods together with earwigs and ants (Aigner). Pupa grey-brown, with dark dots on the sides, in a sparse web on the ground, sometimes lying over into the next year. The butterflies in May and again in July and August, in two (irregular?) broods; they fly, usually singly, in localities where the food-plant occurs.
