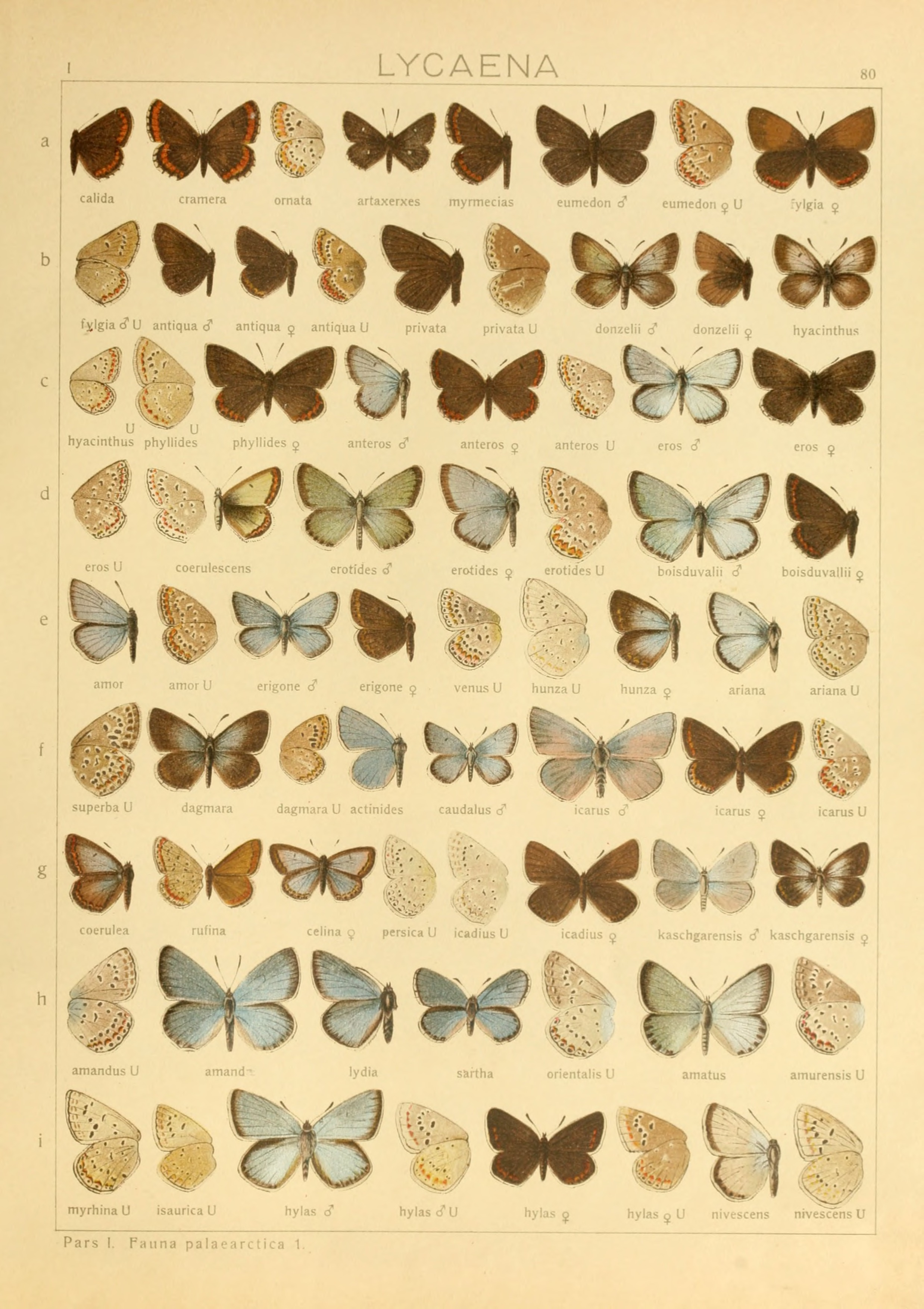
- Seitz plate 80e

Scientific classification
- Kingdom: Animalia
- Phylum: Arthropoda
- Class: Insecta
- Order: Lepidoptera
- Family: Lycaenidae
- Genus: Polyommatus
- Species: P. erigone

Binomial name
- Polyommatus erigone (Grum-Grshimailo, 1890)

= Polyommatus erigone =

Species of butterfly

Polyommatus erigone is a butterfly in the family Lycaenidae. It was described by Grigory Grum-Grshimailo in 1890.

Seitz: "erigone Gr.-Grsh. (80), from the Pamir, is considerably smaller [than eros]; beneath the ocelli are less prominent and the white streak of the hindwing is very distinct. Also the female bears a superficial resemblance to icarus, whose blue colour is almost exactly the same as that of the erigone males; obtained at a considerable altitude (13,000 ft.)."
