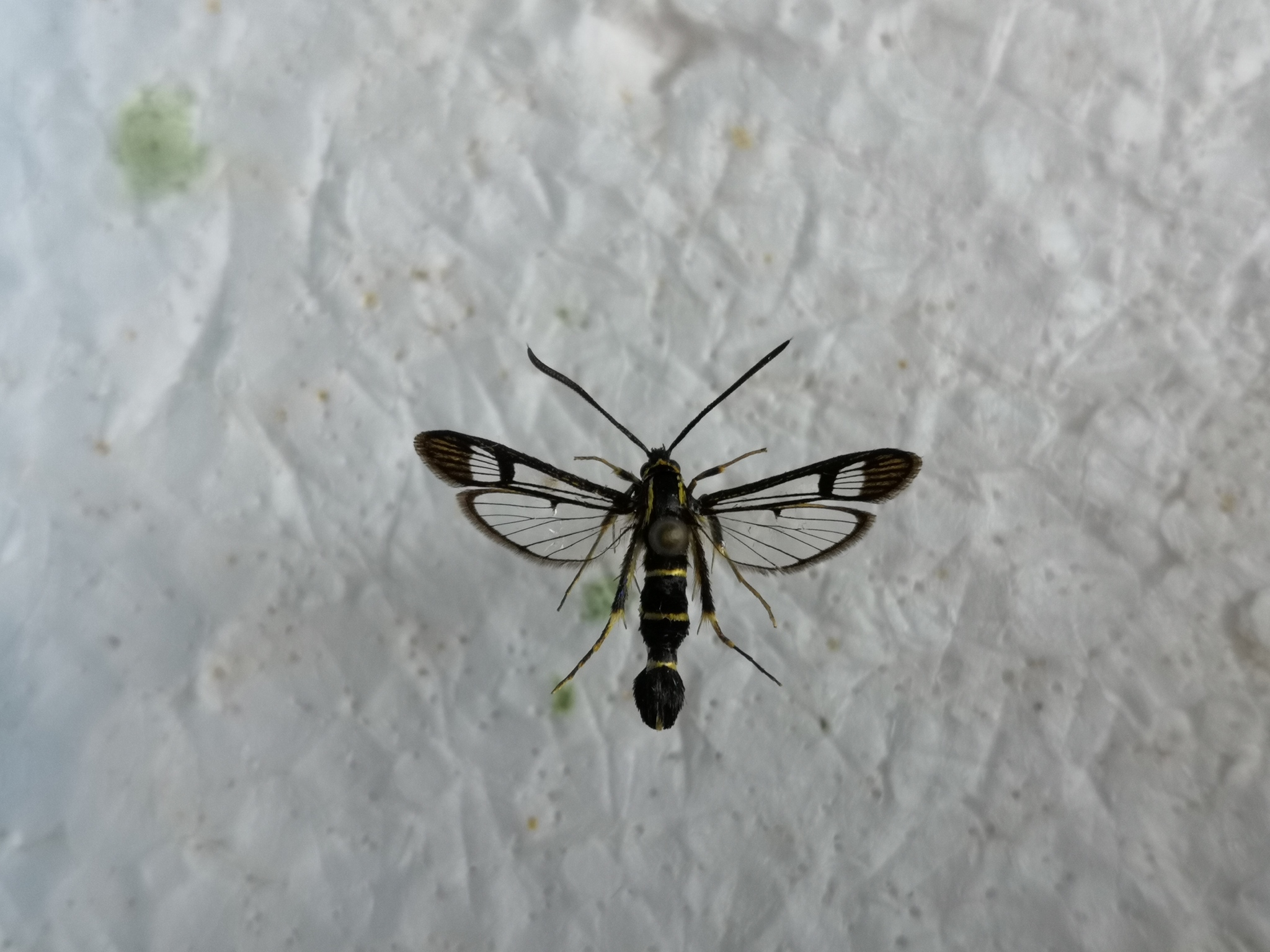
- Synanthedon cephiformis figure 3

Scientific classification
- Kingdom: Animalia
- Phylum: Arthropoda
- Clade: Pancrustacea
- Class: Insecta
- Order: Lepidoptera
- Family: Sesiidae
- Genus: Synanthedon
- Species: S. cephiformis

Binomial name
- Synanthedon cephiformis (Ochsenheimer, 1808)

Synonyms
- Sesia cephiformis Ochsenheimer, 1808; Aegeria gaderensis Králícek & Povolný, 1977; Synanthedon cephiformis ab. fumosa Schütze, 1919; Sesia laspeyres Heppner & Duckworth, 1981

= Synanthedon cephiformis =

Species of moth

Synanthedon cephiformis is a moth of the family Sesiidae. It is found in Central Europe and Eastern Europe.

The wingspan is 17–22 mm. Adults are on wing from June to August.

The larvae feed within galls caused by Melampsorelle caryophyllacearum and Aecidium elatinum on Abies alba, Picea excelsa, Larix decidua and Juniperus communis.
