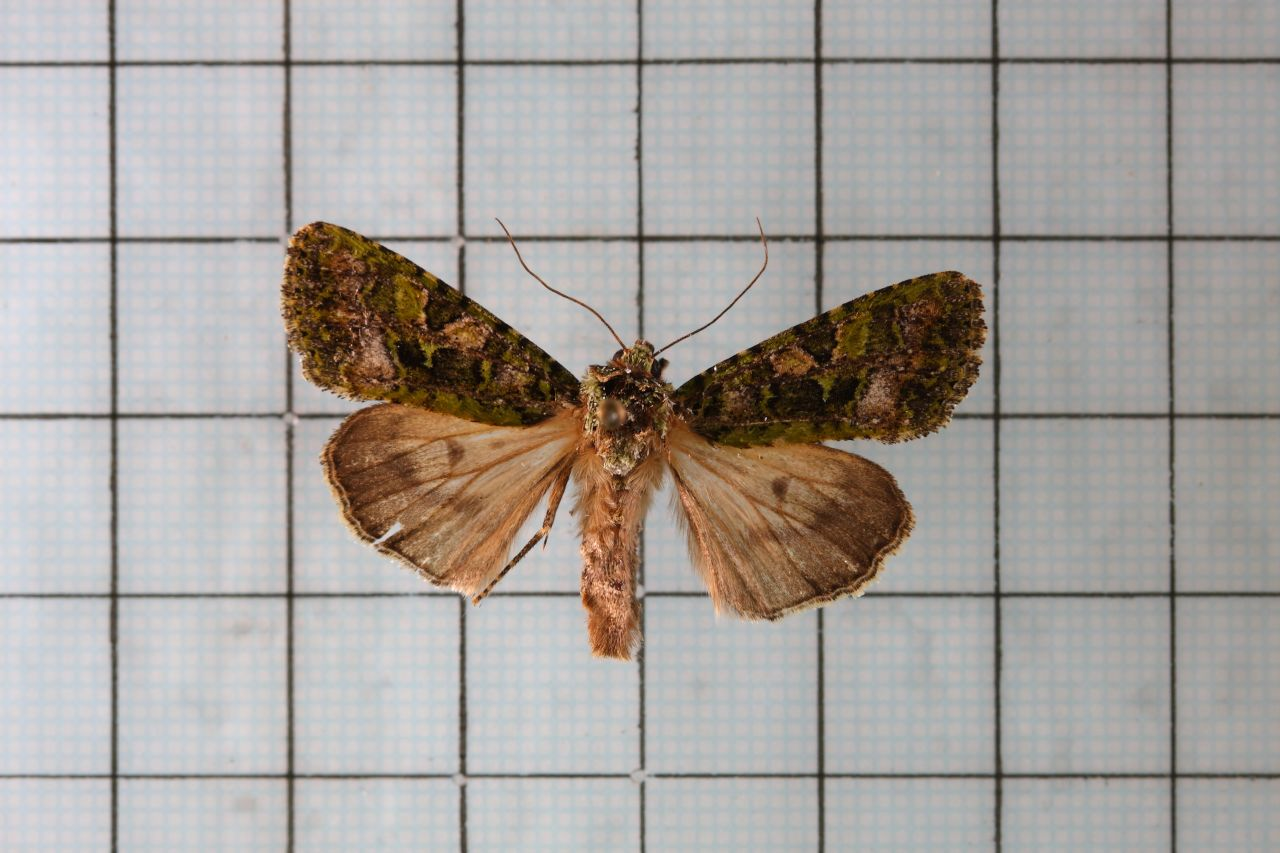

Scientific classification
- Kingdom: Animalia
- Phylum: Arthropoda
- Class: Insecta
- Order: Lepidoptera
- Superfamily: Noctuoidea
- Family: Noctuidae
- Genus: Trachea
- Species: T. auriplena

Binomial name
- Trachea auriplena (Walker, 1857)

Synonyms
- Eurois auriplena Walker, 1857; Trachea auriplea

= Trachea auriplena =

Species of moth

Trachea auriplena is a species of moth of the family Noctuidae. It is found in Taiwan, China, India, Sri Lanka and Malaysia.

The wingspan is 42–49 mm.
