= Ferdinand Ochsenheimer =

German actor and entomologist

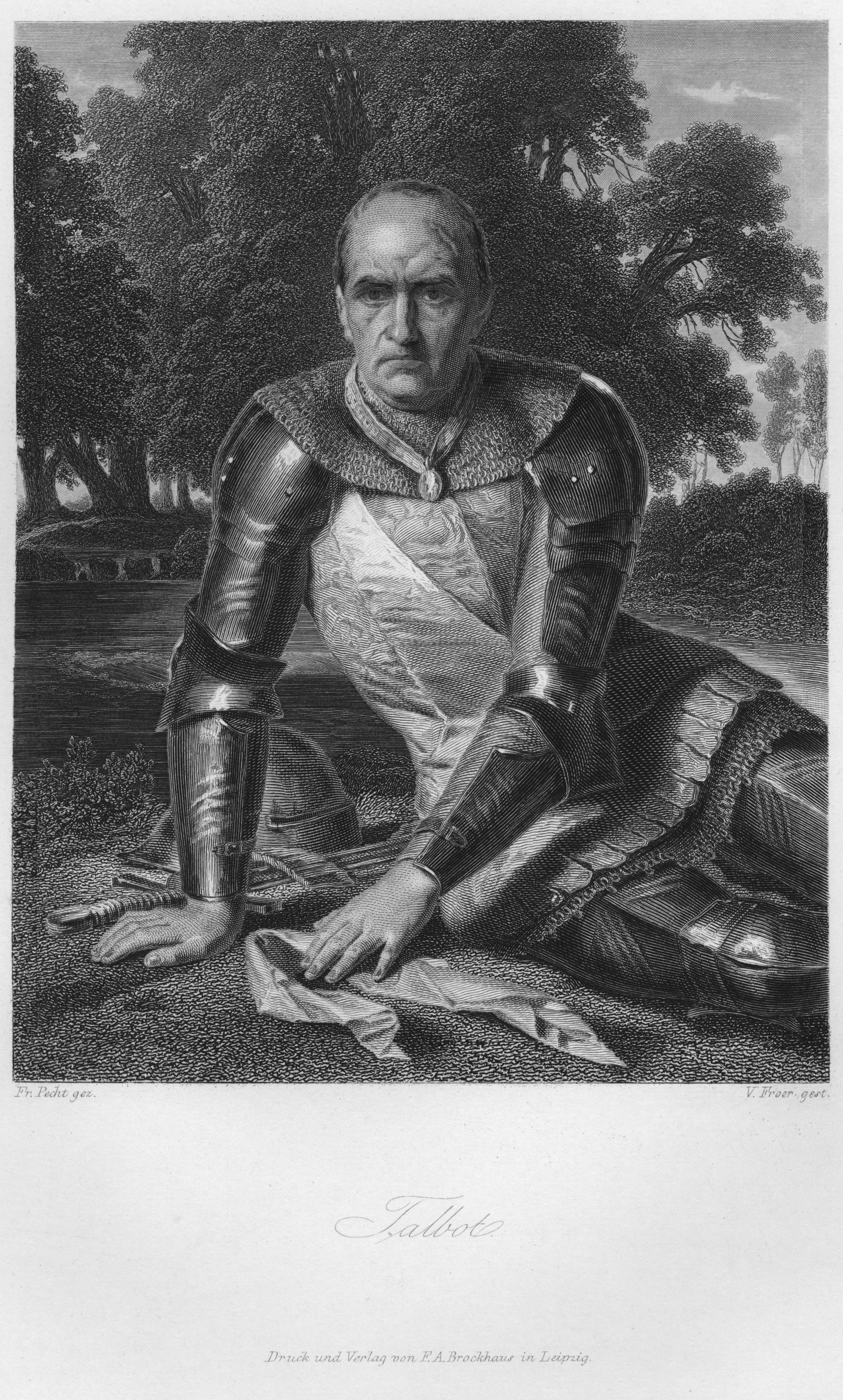
Ferdinand Ochsenheimer

Ferdinand Ochsenheimer (17 March 1767 – 2 November 1822) was a German actor and entomologist (lepidopterist).

== Life ==
Ochsenheimer was born and brought up in Mainz (then in the Electorate of Mainz) and began to show an interest in butterflies and moths in his early youth. At the age of twelve he was apprenticed with a saddler but when his intellectual abilities were recognized friends of his father's enabled him to study natural history at the university. On 16 September 1788 he received his degree of Doktor der Philosophie. He found employment as an educator with Stadtkommandant von Dallwigh in Mannheim, then with Baron von Reipelt.

In Mannheim Ochsenheimer wrote his first stage comedies (Er soll sich schlagen, Der Brautschatz). At the age of 27 he decided to follow a career as an actor and entered into Quandt's troupe of actors in Bayreuth. His first appearance was on 12 November 1794 as Flickwort in Gotter's Schwarzer Mann. After trying his hand in several fields – he was engaged as an opera tenor for a while – he finally committed himself to acting after successes as Gebhard in Portrait der Mutter and as Fallbring in Dienstpflicht. In 1796 he responded to a call from the Döbbelinsche Bühne (Döbbelin stage) in Stargard. On his way he stayed in Leipzig where he performed at the kürfürstliches Hoftheater (prince-elector's court theatre) as Fallbring and as Stepanoff with the result that he was immediately engaged. So after fulfilling his obligations in Stargard and in Frankfurt/Oder he came to Dresden in early 1797 and became one of the most popular members of an actor company that played alternately in Leipzig and in Dresden.

In 1798 symptoms of stress and overstrain began to manifest themselves and his doctor recommended more exercise. Taking long walks in the country Ochsenheimer's interest in lepidopterology was rekindled "and without noticing it he had, in seeking recovery from one task, taken over another, not less laborious one." Around this time he made the acquaintance of playwright Friedrich Treitschke who was returning from Switzerland to Leipzig and who shared both his interest in acting and in lepidopterology. In 1801 Ochsenheimer played Talbot in Schiller's Die Jungfrau von Orleans (The Maid of Orleans) with Schiller attending the performance of 17 September and praising Ochsenheimer's accomplishment. He was now offered guest parts at most major theatres in the German-speaking countries.

In 1802 during a guest performance at the Königliches Hoftheater (royal court theatre) in Berlin he met Jakob Heinrich Laspeyres who encouraged him to publish parts of his entomological journals. Although he went to work immediately he planned the book at such a scale that it was not until 1805 that the first part, the natural history of the butterflies of Saxony, was published. Due to problems with the editor he was forced to discontinue the work and began an even more detailed treatment under the title Die Schmetterlinge von Europa (The Lepidoptera of Europe). In the same year he made a tour to Mannheim and Mainz and also to Frankfurt where he used all his spare time to work in the famous collection of Johann Christian Gerning. In December he was invited to Berlin and again exchanged views and experiences with Laspeyres.

In May 1807 he played twelve guest parts in Wien (Vienna) where Treitschke meanwhile held a position at the k.-k. Hoftheater (imperial-royal court theatre) and would have liked to permanently engage Ochsenheimer. To achieve this Treitschke travelled to Dresden in July and succeeded in negotiating a discontinuation of Ochsenheimer's contract with the Dresden stage. In November 1807 Ochsenheimer came to Wien and that same year the first volume of Die Schmetterlinge von Europa appeared. Although it could be called a greatly enlarged and revised version of the Butterflies of Saxony it did contain many new facts and included several new species which Ochsenheimer had received from Portugal by Hoffmannsegg, found in Viennese collections (from southern France and Russia) and in the Gerning collection. As he was not fully employed from the start in Wien he could complete the second volume (Sphingidae, Zygaenidae, Sesiidae) in 1808. That year Treitsche was forced to cut down on his workload for reasons of health, began to take up lepidopterology again and became Ochsenheimer's companion on many excursions. In 1810 the third volume (larger "macro-moths" including Psychidae) was published. Ochsenheimer purchased the Radda collection, Treitschke bought a small collection, and both were combined. With this basis Ochsenheimer went to work at the next volumes "but from 1815 his powers were waning fast." Volume four was completed, with Treitschke's help, in 1816. It contains supplements to the preceding volumes and a draft system of the noctuid moths (Noctuidae) with many new genera. In 1817 Ochsenheimer was instructed to revise the Lepidoptera collections of the k.-k. Hofmuseum (imperial-royal court museum), a task which took him more than a year as he included all non-European taxa. His health was deteriorating steadily and in the next volume he wrote only part of the first genus (Acronicta); the main work was done by Treitschke. On 23 September 1822 he fainted after a performance in Vienna; on 2 November around 10 p.m. he died.

== Actor and entomologist ==
Ochsenheimer was an excellent character actor and was compared with Iffland for his facial expression and his pronunciation. In the roles of villains he is said to have been of staggering impact, and excellent as old fogies and pedants. Among his crowning achievements were Gottl. Koke in Parteiwut, Wurm in Kabale und Liebe or Marinelli in Emilia Galotti. He also published plays, in part under the pseudonym Theobald Unklar. "In private life he was, like most comedians, melancholy, dry, bland, even boring, except when discussing entomological subjects; he also was a misogynist."

The following may be an anecdotal generalisation: "After rehearsal he used to leave the city to collect [butterflies and moths] in the vicinity and returned only shortly before the performance. When he had had a lucky day he played marvellously, moving his audience to frenetic applause. But when he had found little or nothing he was disgruntled and did not rise above mediocrity."

As an entomologist Ochsenheimer was one of the most influential lepidopterists of the early 19th century. His work "Die Schmetterlinge von Europa" was later continued by Friedrich Treitschke and grew to ten volumes. Although not accompanied by figures or plates it contains a wealth of information on the biology and ecology of the species and it includes careful and detailed descriptions of new taxa, among them Thymelicus lineola (Hesperiidae), Polyommatus eros, Iolana iolas (Lycaenidae), Psilogaster loti (Lasiocampidae), Hyles zygophylli (Sphingidae), Phalera bucephaloides (Notodontidae), Hoplodrina superstes, Polia serratilinea (Noctuidae), Pyropteron doryliformis, Synanthedon cephiformis (Sesiidae), Pachythelia villosella (Psychidae), Zygaena hilaris, Zygaena punctum, Zygaena angelicae (Zygaenidae) and others.

The Linnean Lepidoptera system had already begun to be subdivided by Fabricius in the late 18th century and Ochsenheimer further refined it by the creation of many new genera. Among them are well-known names like Zerynthia, Charaxes, Endromis, Aglia, Gastropacha, Thyatira, Notodonta, Acronicta, Plusia, Heliothis, Amphipyra, Caradrina, Cosmia, Xanthia, Apamea, Gortyna, Nonagria, Euclidia, Anarta, Mamestra, Polia, Mythimna, Orthosia, Agrotis, Orgyia, Colocasia and others.

Several taxa have been named in Ochsenheimer's honour: the genus Ochsenheimeria Hübner, 1825 (Ypsolophidae) and the species Nemophora ochsenheimerella (Hübner, 1813), Pammene ochsenheimeriana (Lienig & Zeller, 1846) and Pieris ochsenheimeri Staudinger, 1886.

== Collection ==
Ochsenheimer's collection, comprising 3772 specimens, went to the Hungarian National Museum in 1824. During a flood in 1838 it remained submerged for almost two days. Afterwards it was restored and recurated by Emerich von Frivaldszky. After Treitschke's death his collection also came to the Budapest museum.

== Entomological works ==
- Ochsenheimer, F. (1806): Die Schmetterlinge Sachsens, mit Rücksichten auf alle bekannte europäische Arten. Teil 1. Falter, oder Tagschmetterlinge. – Leipzig (Schwickert). IV (recte VI) + 493 pp.
- Ochsenheimer, F. (1807): Die Schmetterlinge von Europa, vol. 1. Leipzig (Fleischer). 2 + 323 pp.
- Ochsenheimer, F. (1808): Die Schmetterlinge von Europa, vol. 2. Leipzig (Fleischer). 30 + 241 pp.
- Ochsenheimer, F. (1810): Die Schmetterlinge von Europa, vol. 3. Leipzig (Fleischer).
- Ochsenheimer, F. (1816): Die Schmetterlinge von Europa, vol. 4. Leipzig (Fleischer). X + 212 pp.
- Ochsenheimer, F. & Treitschke, F. (1825): Die Schmetterlinge von Europa, vol. 5/1. Leipzig (Fleischer). 414 pp.

== Plays and other works (incomplete list) ==
- Ochsenheimer, F. (1791): Das Manuskript.
- Ochsenheimer, F. (1792): Er soll sich schlagen.
- Ochsenheimer, F. (179?): Der Brautschatz.
- [Ochsenheimer, F.?] (1795): Streifereien durch einige Gegenden Deutschlands. Vom Verfasser der Szenen aus Fausts Leben. – Leipzig (Voß.). 311 pp. This book was formerly attributed to A. W. Schreiber.
