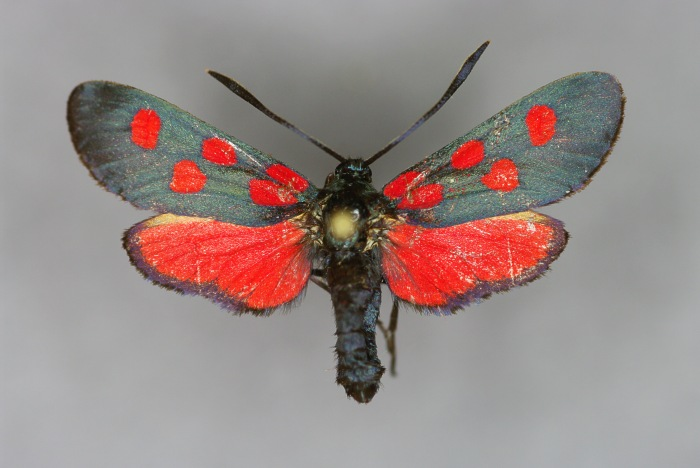

Scientific classification
- Kingdom: Animalia
- Phylum: Arthropoda
- Class: Insecta
- Order: Lepidoptera
- Family: Zygaenidae
- Genus: Zygaena
- Species: Z. angelicae

Binomial name
- Zygaena angelicae Ochsenheimer, 1808

Synonyms
- Zygaena latipennis Herrich-Schäffer, 1852; Zygaena elegans Burgeff, 1913; Zygaena sheljuzhkoiana Holik & Reiss, 1932

= Zygaena angelicae =

Species of moth

Zygaena angelicae (slender Scotch burnet) is a species of moth in the Zygaenidae family. It is found in Central Europe, from Greece to southern Germany and Thuringia. Z.angelicae has blue-black or green-black forewings, whose inner angles are strongly rounded off. On the forewings there are five or six red spots, two of which are always close together. In the five-spotted individuals, the spots on the underside of the wings are connected by a red stripe, in the six-spotted ones this is a large patch. The black margin of the red hind wings is wide. The antennal club is white at the tip less so than in Zygaena transalpina and the white may be completely absent. The wingspan is 30–33 mm.

Adults are on wing from July to mid August on one generation per year. They feed on flowers.

The larvae feed on Coronilla coronata and sometimes Securigera varia and possibly Lotus corniculatus. The species overwinters in the larval stage. Larvae can be found from September and, after overwintering, to June of the following year. The habitat is chalk grassland. In Southeastern Europe Zygaena angelicae is found in mountainous regions between 1000 and 2100m elevation.

== Subspecies ==
- Zygaena angelicae angelicae
- Zygaena angelicae angelicotransalpina Daniel, 1954
- Zygaena angelicae elegans Burgeff, 1913
- Zygaena angelicae herzegowinensis Reiss, 1922
- Zygaena angelicae rhatisbonensis Burgeff, 1914
- Zygaena angelicae ternovanensis Koch, 1938
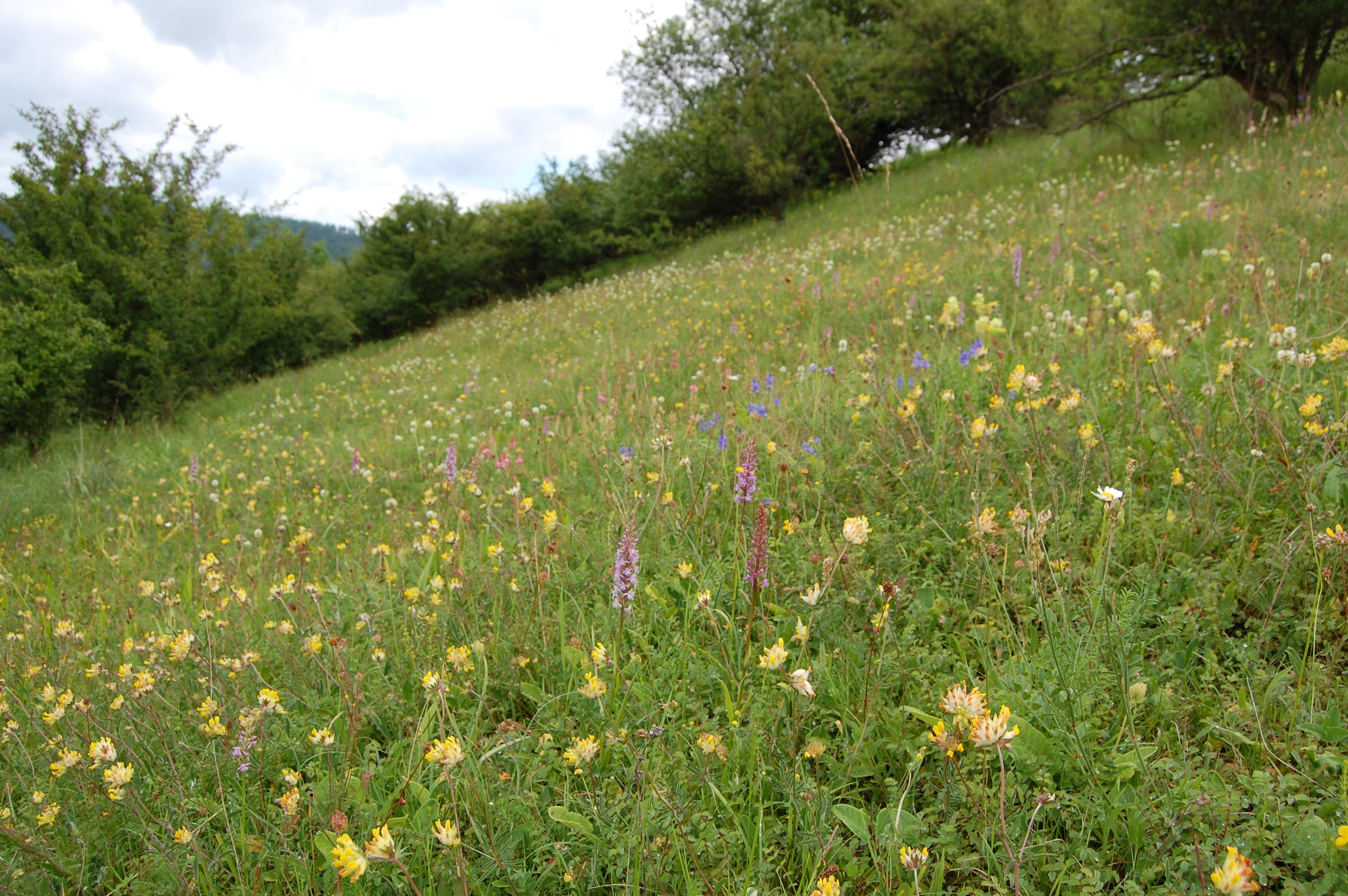
Habitat

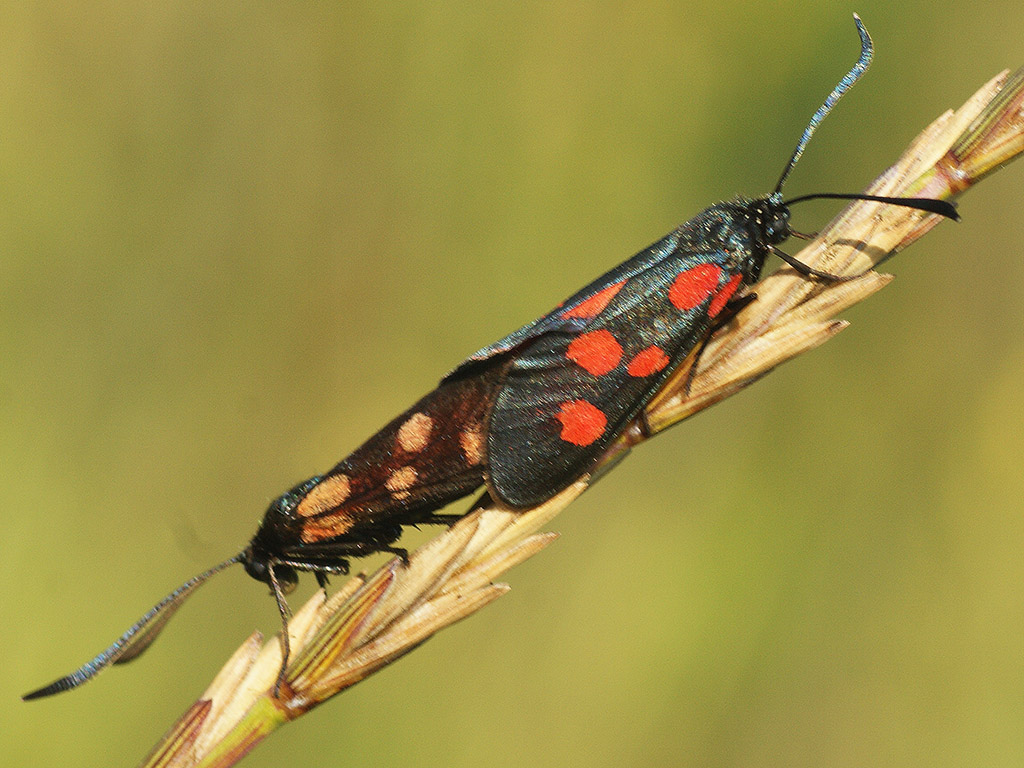
Z. angelicae in copula

== Bibliography ==
- Šašić, Martina; Nahirnić, Ana; Tarmann, Gerhard M. (2016-12-31). "Zygaenidae (Lepidoptera) in the Lepidoptera collections of the Croatian Natural History Museum". Natura Croatica: Periodicum Musei Historiae Naturalis Croatici. 25 (2): 233–248. doi:10.20302/NC.2016.25.19. eISSN 1848-7386.
