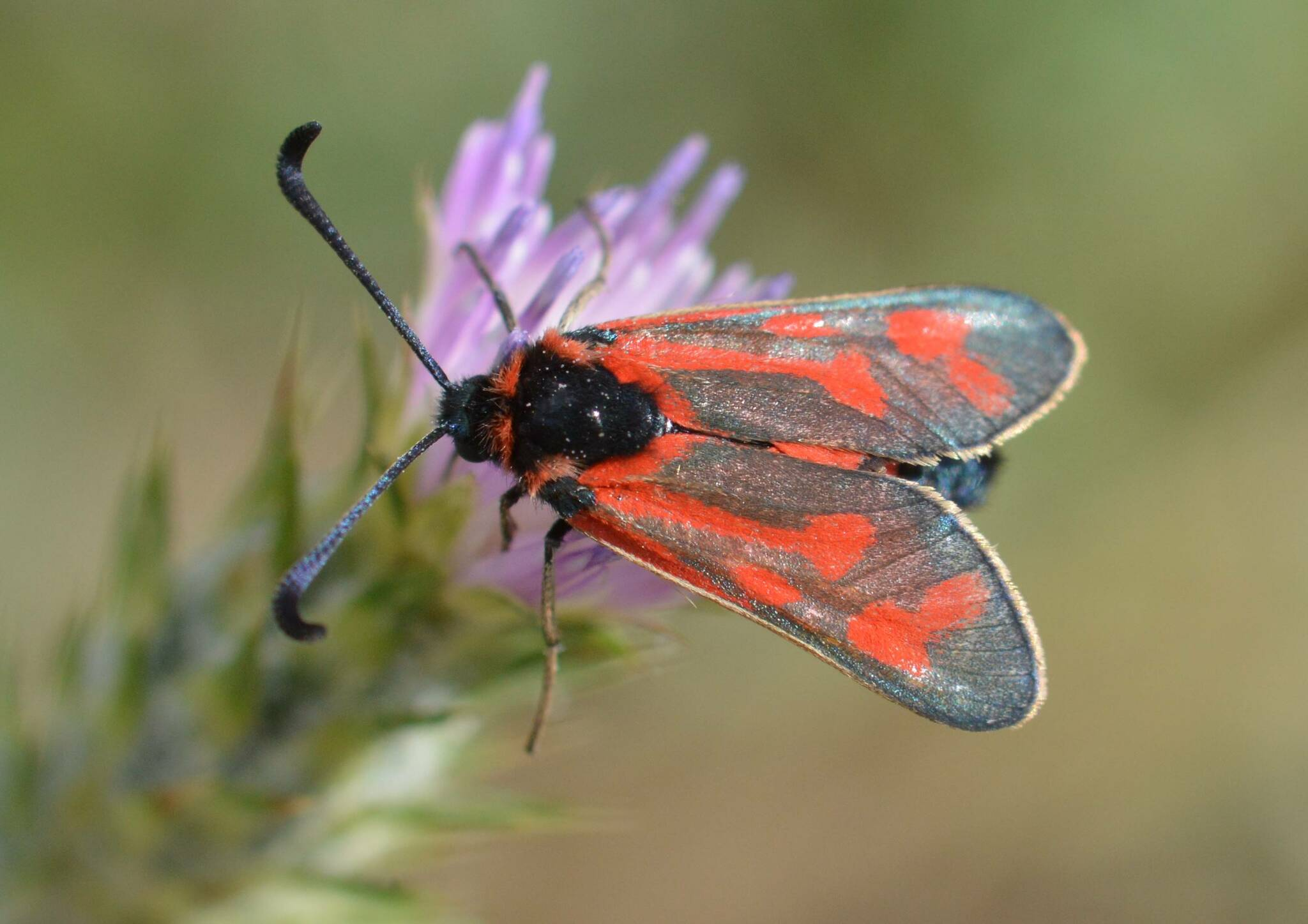

Scientific classification
- Kingdom: Animalia
- Phylum: Arthropoda
- Class: Insecta
- Order: Lepidoptera
- Family: Zygaenidae
- Genus: Zygaena
- Species: Z. loyselis

Binomial name
- Zygaena loyselis Oberthür, 1876

= Zygaena loyselis =

Species of moth

Zygaena loyselis is a species of moth in the Zygaenidae family. It is found in the Atlas Mountains (in Morocco, Algeria, Tunisia).

In Seitz (1913):

Z. loyselis Oberth. (4f g) has always a rosy red collar, and a narrow but bright rosy red abdominal belt; otherwise resembling favonia, but most specimens considerably larger. Normally the red basal area of loyselis separated into 2—3 longitudinal spots, and the apical patch into 2 red rounded spots. If the spots are more or less confluent, we haveab. confluens Dziurz.

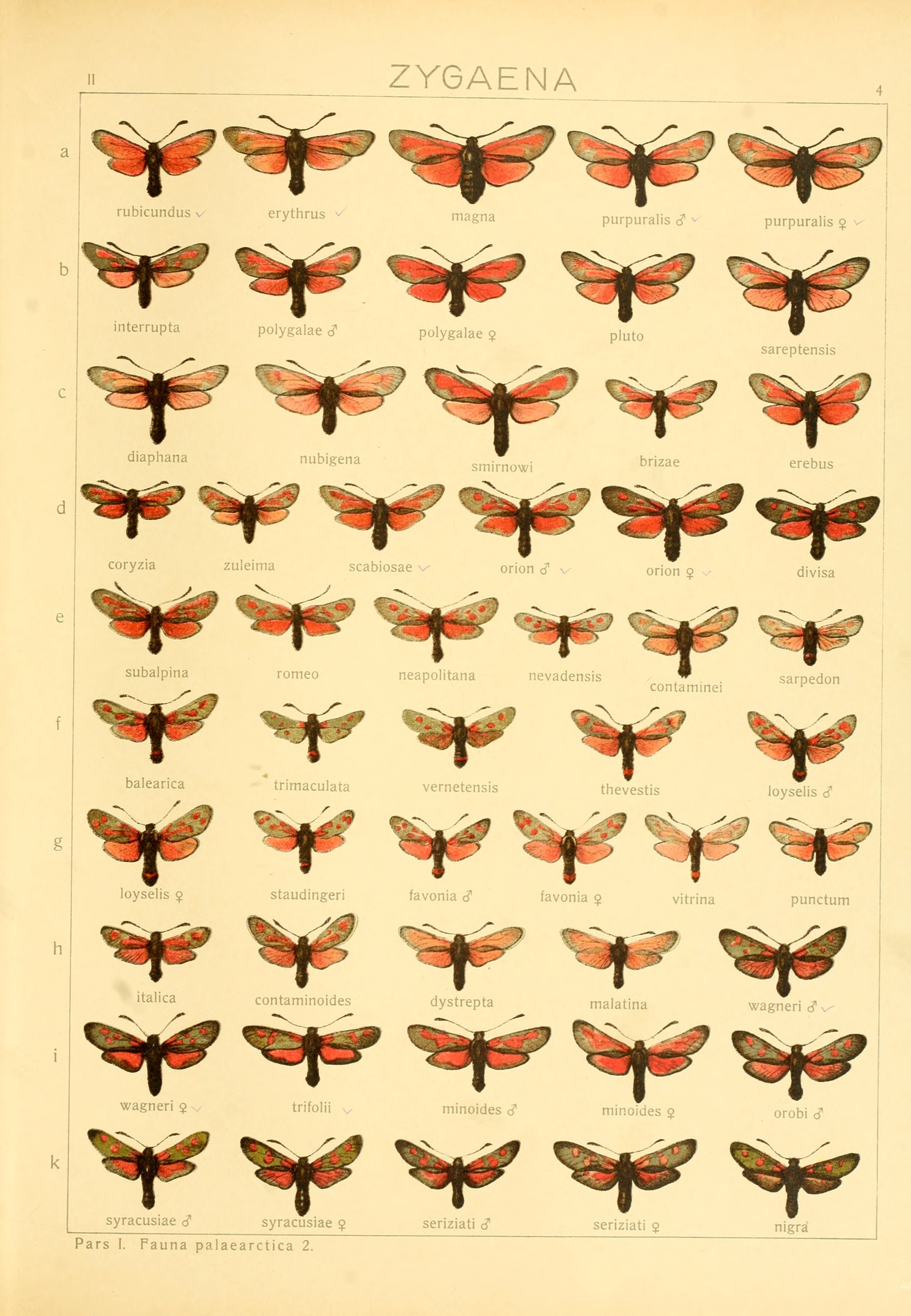
In Die Gross-Schmetterlinge der Erde (The Macrolepidoptera of the World)
