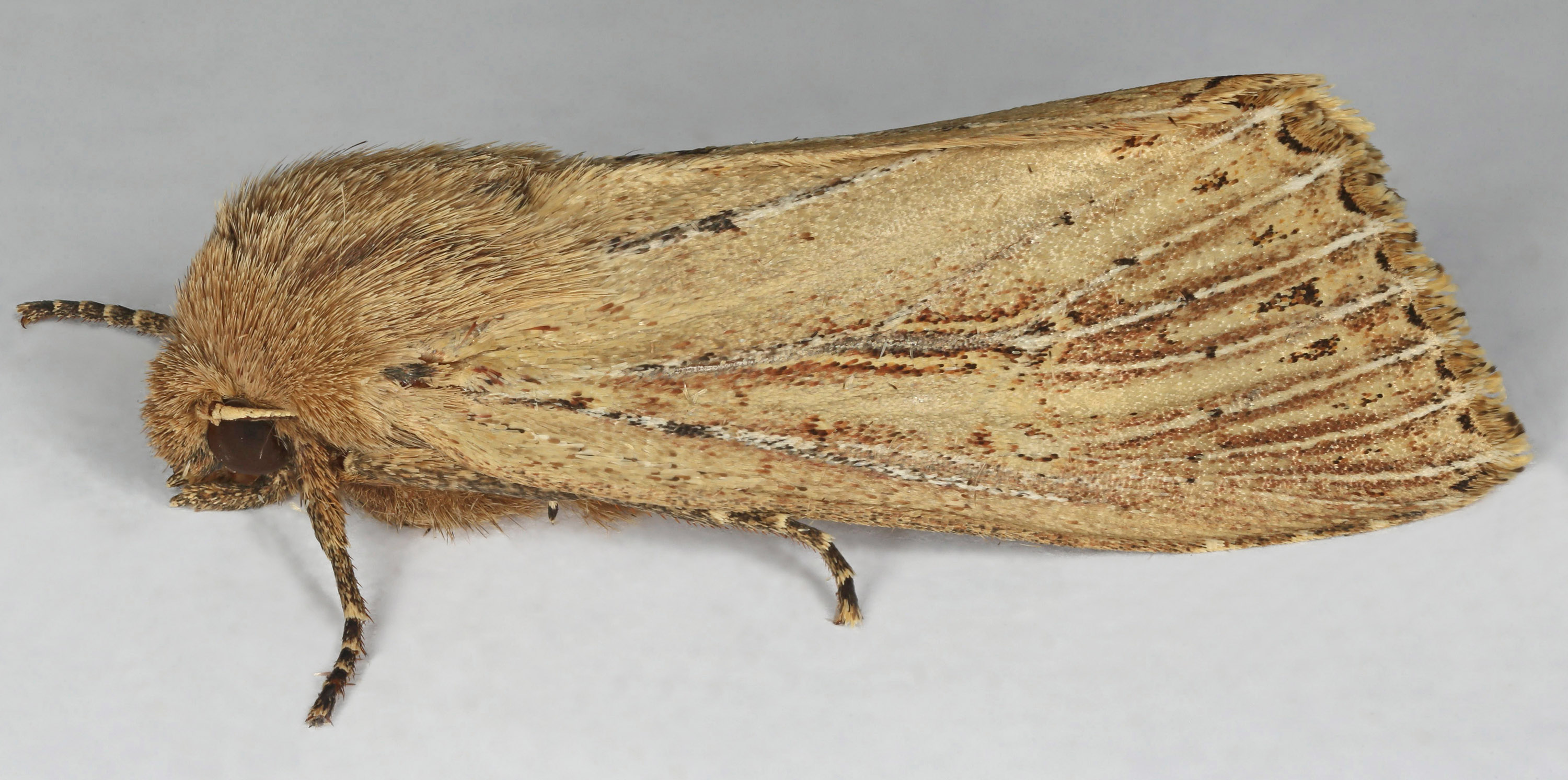

Scientific classification
- Domain: Eukaryota
- Kingdom: Animalia
- Phylum: Arthropoda
- Class: Insecta
- Order: Lepidoptera
- Superfamily: Noctuoidea
- Family: Noctuidae
- Genus: Nonagria
- Species: N. typhae

Binomial name
- Nonagria typhae (Thunberg, 1784)

Synonyms
- Noctua typhae Thunberg, 1784; Noctua arundinis Fabricius, 1787; Phalaena (Noctua) nervosa Esper, 1790; Nonagria fraterna Treitschke, 1835

= Nonagria typhae =

Species of moth

The bulrush wainscot (Nonagria typhae) is a moth of the family Noctuidae. It is found from Ireland and Portugal to southern Fennoscandia, east to western Siberia, the Altai Mountains, Yakutia, Turkey, the Caucasus, Lebanon, Egypt, Arabia, Iraq, Iran, Afghanistan and Central Asia.

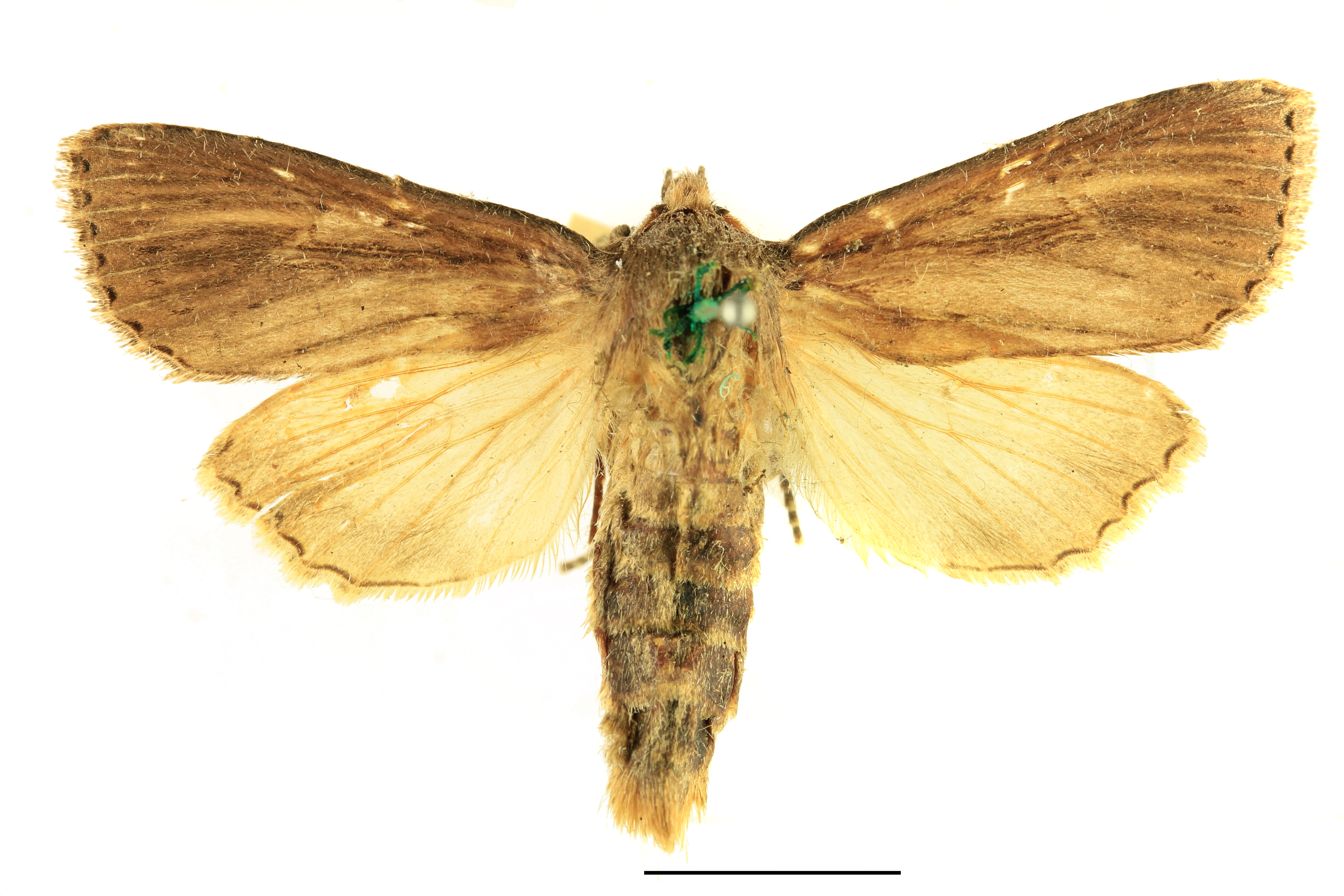

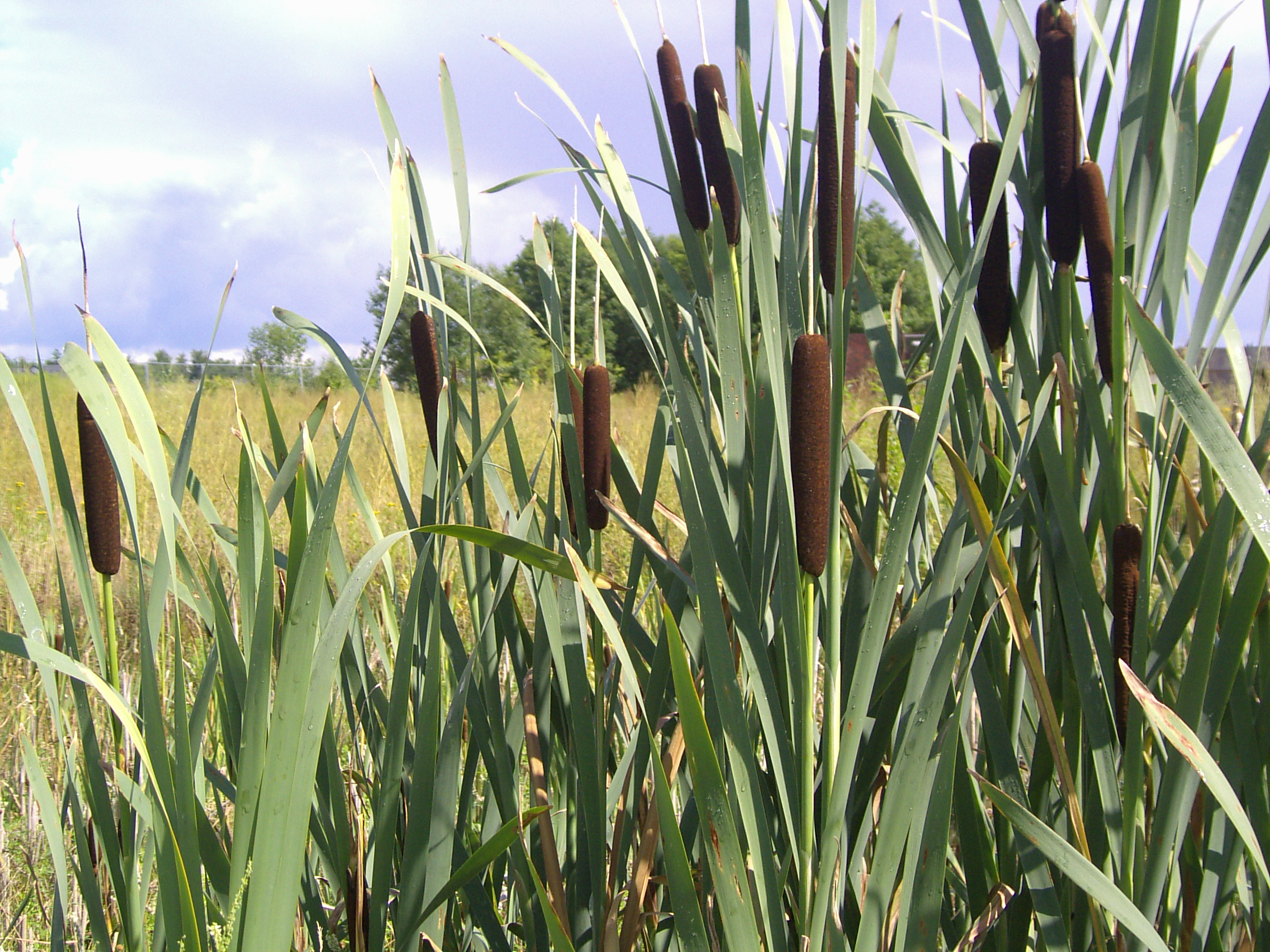
Habitat

== Description ==
The wingspan is 45–50 mm. Adults are on wing from July to October.

"The fore wings of this species (Plate 144. Fig 5), usually of a pale whity-brown colour, in some specimens are reddish tinged; or they may be almost uniformly reddish brown or blackish (var. fraterna Treit.). The row of black spots on the outer area are wedge-shaped and are placed just before the margin. The caterpillar is pale ochreous more or less tinged with pink; a paler line along the spiracles; head and plate on first ring of the body red-brown. July to August, in stems of Typha. The moth flies in August and September, and although it may be netted when on the wing at dusk, or at light, it is obtained in better condition by rearing it from the chrysalis, which may be found in the stems (Plate 148, Fig. 3), those of the previous year for choice, of reed mace." South, 1907.

The larvae feed on bulrush (Typha latifolia) and lesser bulrush (Typha angustifolia).

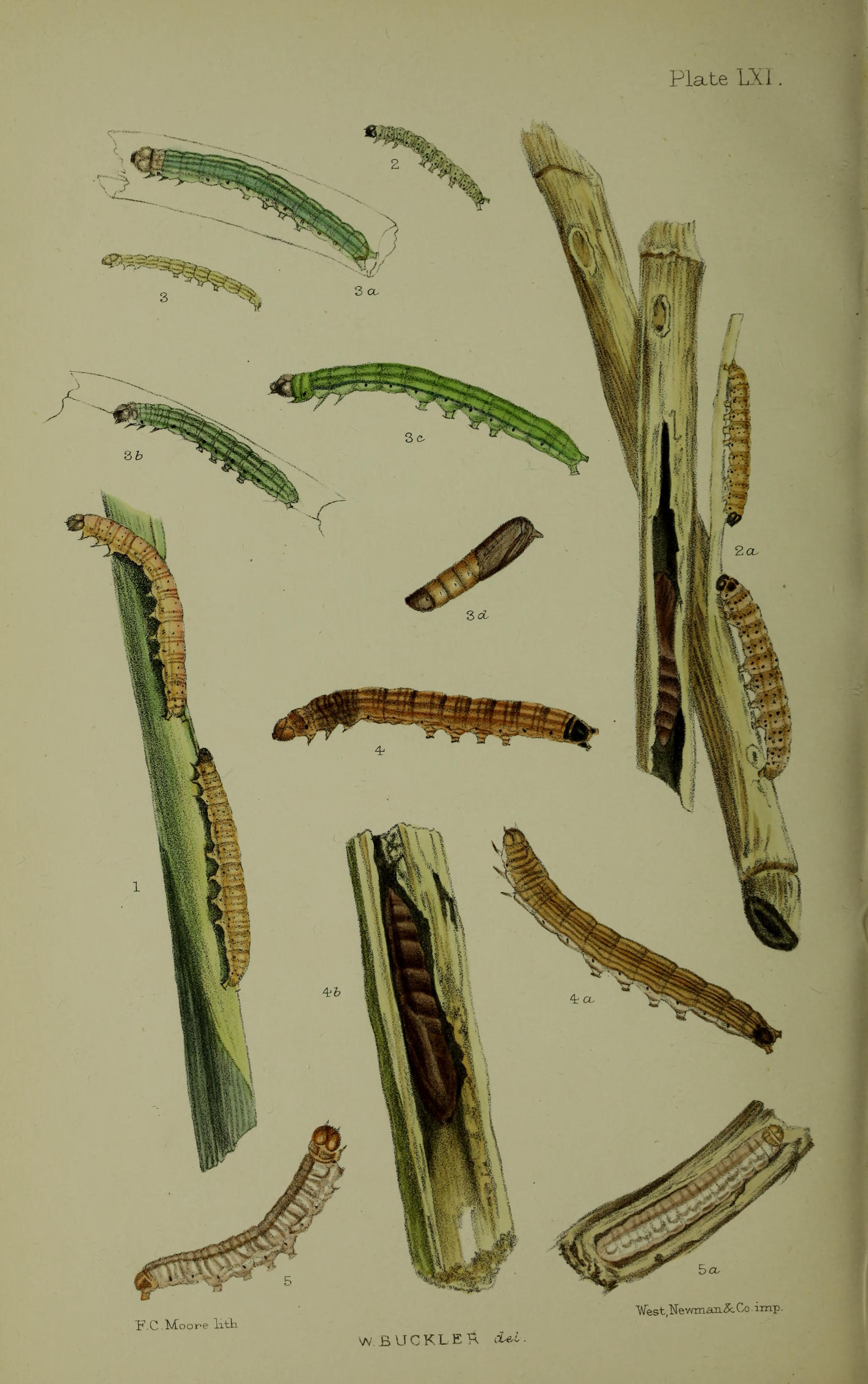
Figs 4, 4a larvae after final moult 4b pupa in stem of Typha latifolia
