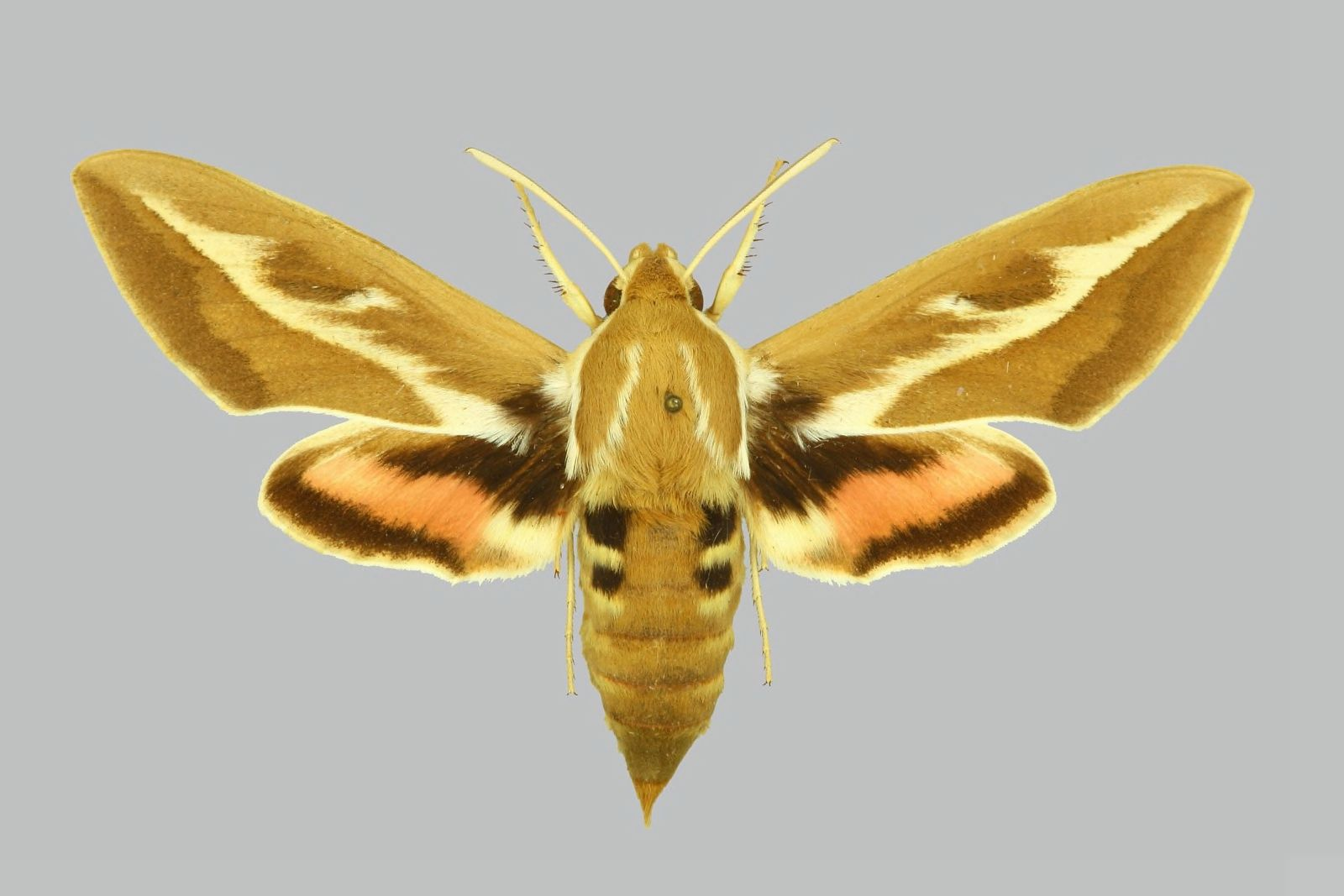
- Female

Scientific classification
- Kingdom: Animalia
- Phylum: Arthropoda
- Class: Insecta
- Order: Lepidoptera
- Family: Sphingidae
- Genus: Hyles
- Species: H. zygophylli

Binomial name
- Hyles zygophylli (Ochsenheimer, 1808)

Synonyms
- Sphinx zygophylli Ochsenheimer, 1808; Sphinx zygophylli Baron Marschall de Bieberstein, 1809; Celerio zygophylli jaxartis Froreich, 1938; Celerio zygophylli xanthoxyli Derzhavets, 1977; Hyles zygophylli kirgisa Eitschberger & Lukhtanov, 1996

= Hyles zygophylli =

Bean-caper hawkmoth

Species of moth

Hyles zygophylli, the bean-caper hawkmoth, is a moth of the family Sphingidae. The species was first described by Ferdinand Ochsenheimer in 1808. It is found in western and eastern Turkey, Armenia, eastern Transcaucasia, Daghestan, northern Syria, northern Iran, Turkmenistan, Kazakhstan, Uzbekistan, Kyrgyzstan, Tajikistan and northern Afghanistan. It is also found from western, northern and central Xinjiang province east to Shaanxi province and north to Mongolia. There is one record of a vagrant from Croatia.

The wingspan is 60–75 mm. Adults are on wing from the end of April to mid-May, July or August and sometimes mid-September in two or three generations. In cooler mountainous areas, most are on wing during June and July, with a partial second generation in late September or October.

The larvae feed on Zygophyllum fabago and other Zygophyllum species such as Zygophyllum oxianum. They possibly also feed on flower-heads of Eremurus. Larvae have also been reared on Tribulus species.
