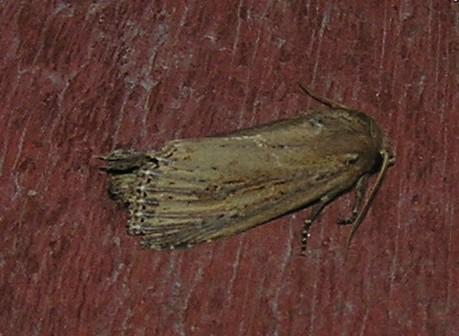
- Nonagria typhae

Scientific classification
- Domain: Eukaryota
- Kingdom: Animalia
- Phylum: Arthropoda
- Class: Insecta
- Order: Lepidoptera
- Superfamily: Noctuoidea
- Family: Noctuidae
- Genus: Nonagria; Ochsenheimer, 1816

= Nonagria =

Genus of moths

Nonagria is a genus of moths of the family Noctuidae first described by Ferdinand Ochsenheimer in 1816.

== Description ==
Its eyes are naked and without lashes. The proboscis is thin. Palpi obliquely porrect (extending forward), where the second joint evenly scaled and third joint prominent. Thorax and abdomen tuftless. Tibia spineless. Wings with non-crenulate cilia. Forewings with the acute apex. Hindwings with stalked veins 6 and 7 or from cell.

== Species ==
- Nonagria fumea (Hampson, 1902)
- Nonagria grisescens (Hampson, 1910)
- Nonagria intestata Walker, 1856
- Nonagria leucaneura (Hampson, 1910)
- Nonagria lineosa Maassen, 1890
- Nonagria monilis Maassen, 1890
- Nonagria puengeleri (Schawerda, 1924)
- Nonagria typhae (Thunberg, 1784)
