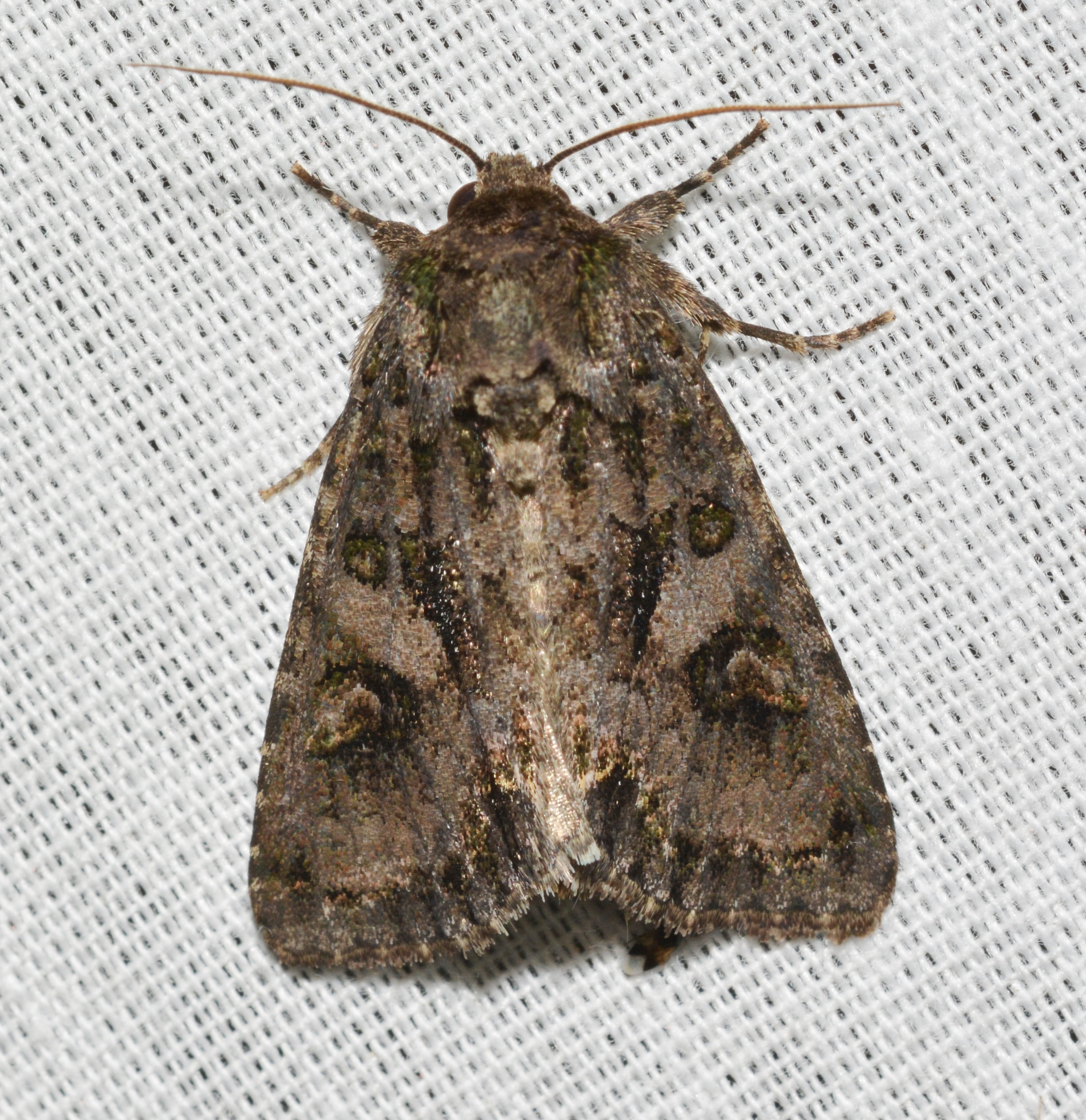

Scientific classification
- Domain: Eukaryota
- Kingdom: Animalia
- Phylum: Arthropoda
- Class: Insecta
- Order: Lepidoptera
- Superfamily: Noctuoidea
- Family: Noctuidae
- Genus: Trachea
- Species: T. delicata

Binomial name
- Trachea delicata (Grote, 1874)

= Trachea delicata =

Species of moth

Trachea delicata is a species of cutworm or dart moth in the family Noctuidae that occurs in North America.

The MONA or Hodges number for Trachea delicata is 9626.
