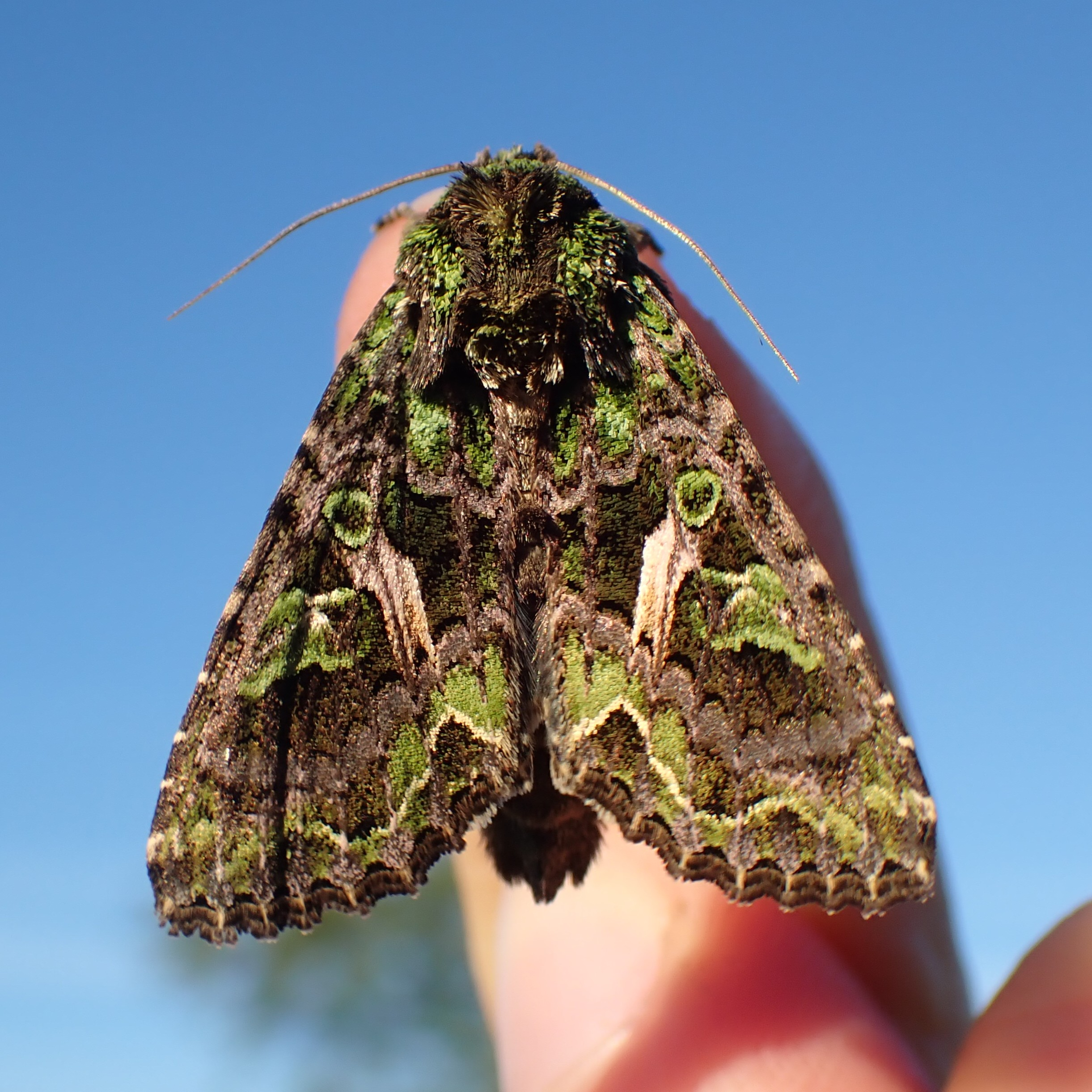

Scientific classification
- Kingdom: Animalia
- Phylum: Arthropoda
- Clade: Pancrustacea
- Class: Insecta
- Order: Lepidoptera
- Superfamily: Noctuoidea
- Family: Noctuidae
- Genus: Trachea
- Species: T. atriplicis

Binomial name
- Trachea atriplicis (Linnaeus, 1758)

= Trachea atriplicis =

Species of moth

The orache moth (Trachea atriplicis) is a species of moth of the family Noctuidae. It is found in all of Europe, east across the Palearctic to the Pacific Ocean and Japan.

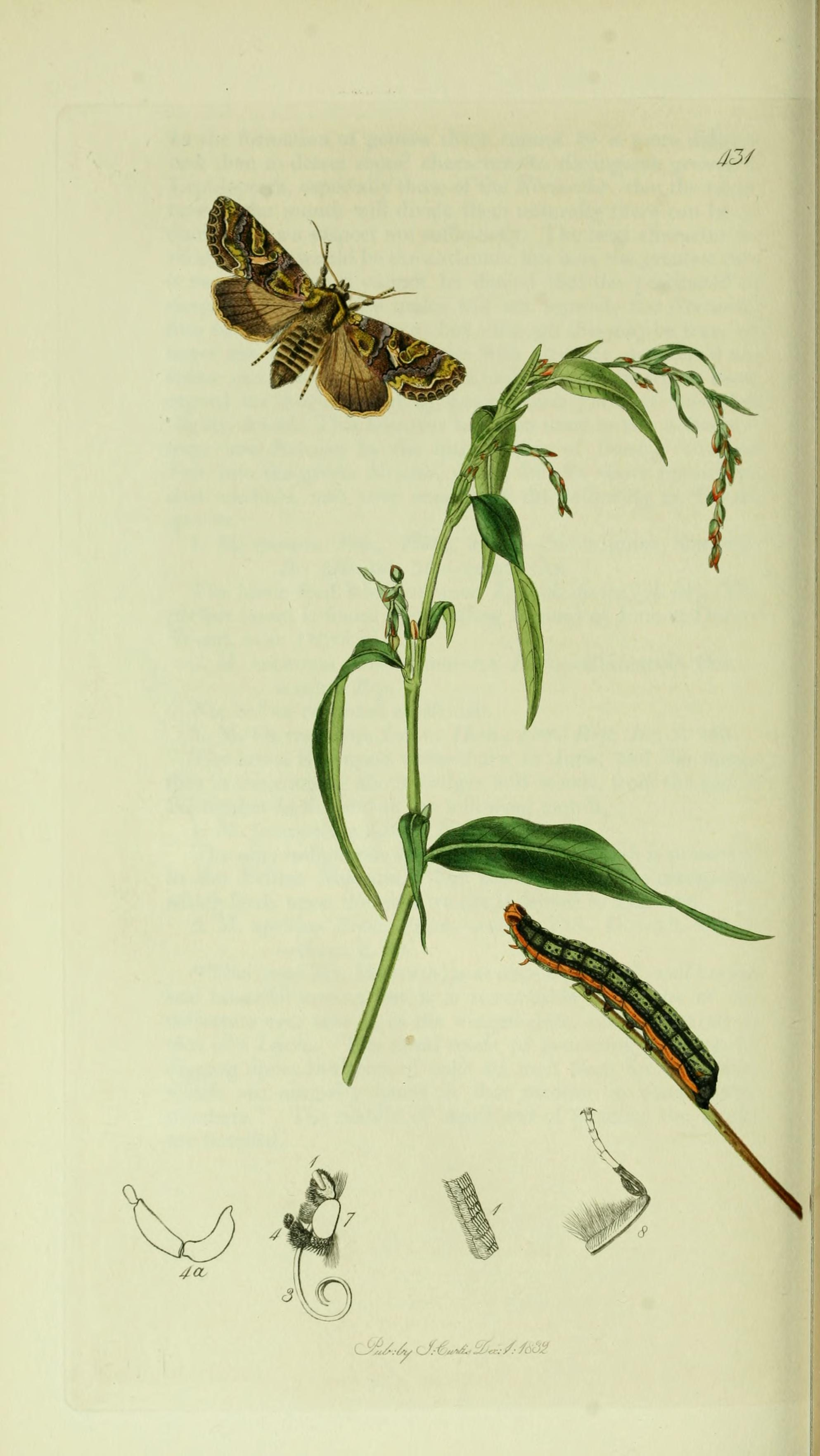
Illustration from John Curtis's British Entomology Volume 5

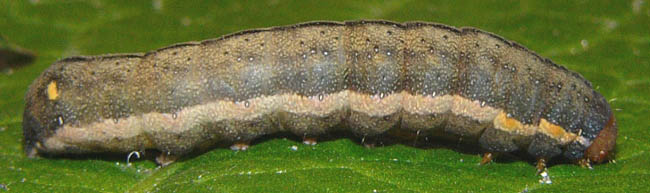
Larva

== Technical description and variation ==
T. atriplicis L. (43 g). Forewing greyish purple irrorated with fuscous; the basal area and the shade preceding submarginal line, especially in the lower half, and the upper stigmata bright pale green; median area below subcostal vein deep dark green; a large white, generally pinkish-tinged blotch with bifid extremity runs along vein 2 to outer line; submarginal line greenish white, angled sharply inwards on submedian fold and bluntly beyond the cell, accompanied by dark and light green clouds; hindwing fuscous grey, the outer half dark fuscous, with traces of dark cellspot and outer line; — ab. similis Stgr., recorded from Ussuri. and also Central Germany, has the green tints altered into olive, and the pale blotch yellow; ab. diffusa Spul. has all the markings faint and washed out; (this is usually the case with bred examples); the Japanese form — ab. gnoma Btlr. (43 g) is larger, deeper purple, the green shadings less developed, the white blotch larger and more conspicuous. — Larva purplish brown, sometimes with a green tinge; dorsal and subdorsal lines blackish, with faint oblique lateral stripes; spiracular lines pinkish white, darker above. The wingspan is 38–42 mm. The length of the forewings is 20–22 mm.

== Biology ==
The moth flies from May to October depending on the location.

The larvae feed on herbaceous plants, such as Atriplex, Polygonum aviculare, Chenopodium and Rumex.
