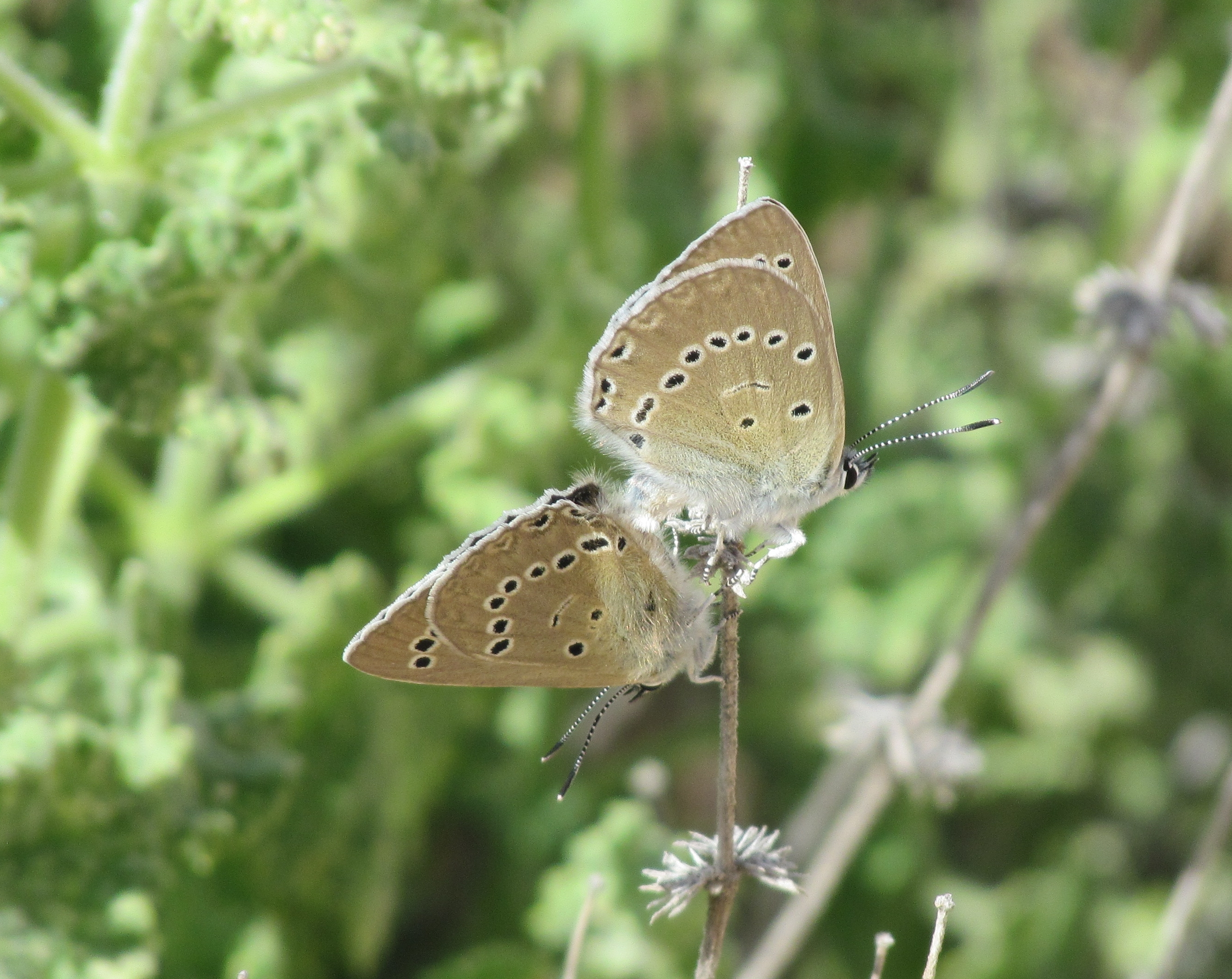
- Iolana alfierii

Scientific classification
- Domain: Eukaryota
- Kingdom: Animalia
- Phylum: Arthropoda
- Class: Insecta
- Order: Lepidoptera
- Family: Lycaenidae
- Subfamily: Polyommatinae
- Tribe: Polyommatini
- Genus: Iolana; Bethune-Baker, 1914

= Iolana =

Butterfly genus in family Lycaenidae

Iolana is a Palearctic genus of butterfly in the family Lycaenidae.

Species include:

- Iolana iolas Ochsenheimer, 1816 iolas blue
  - Iolana iolas iolas Ochsenheimer, 1816 North Africa, South Europe, Asia Minor
  - Iolana iolas lessei (Bernardi, 1964) Armenia.
  - Iolana iolas debiliata (Schultz, 1905) or Iolana debilitata (Schultz, 1905) Morocco and Algeria
- Iolana alfierii Wiltshire, 1948 Egypt
- Iolana andreasi (Sheljuzhko, 1919) Iran
- Iolana gigantea (Grum-Grshimailo, 1885) Afghanistan and Pakistan.
