= Trachea melanospila =

Scientific classification
- Domain: Eukaryota
- Kingdom: Animalia
- Phylum: Arthropoda
- Class: Insecta
- Order: Lepidoptera
- Superfamily: Noctuoidea
- Family: Noctuidae
- Genus: Trachea
- Species: T. melanospila

Binomial name
- Trachea melanospila Kollar, 1844

Synonyms
- Hadena kosakka Oberthür, 1880

Species of moth

Trachea melanospila is a moth of the family Noctuidae first described by Vincenz Kollar in 1844. It is found in Sri Lanka, Korea, Japan and Siberia.
