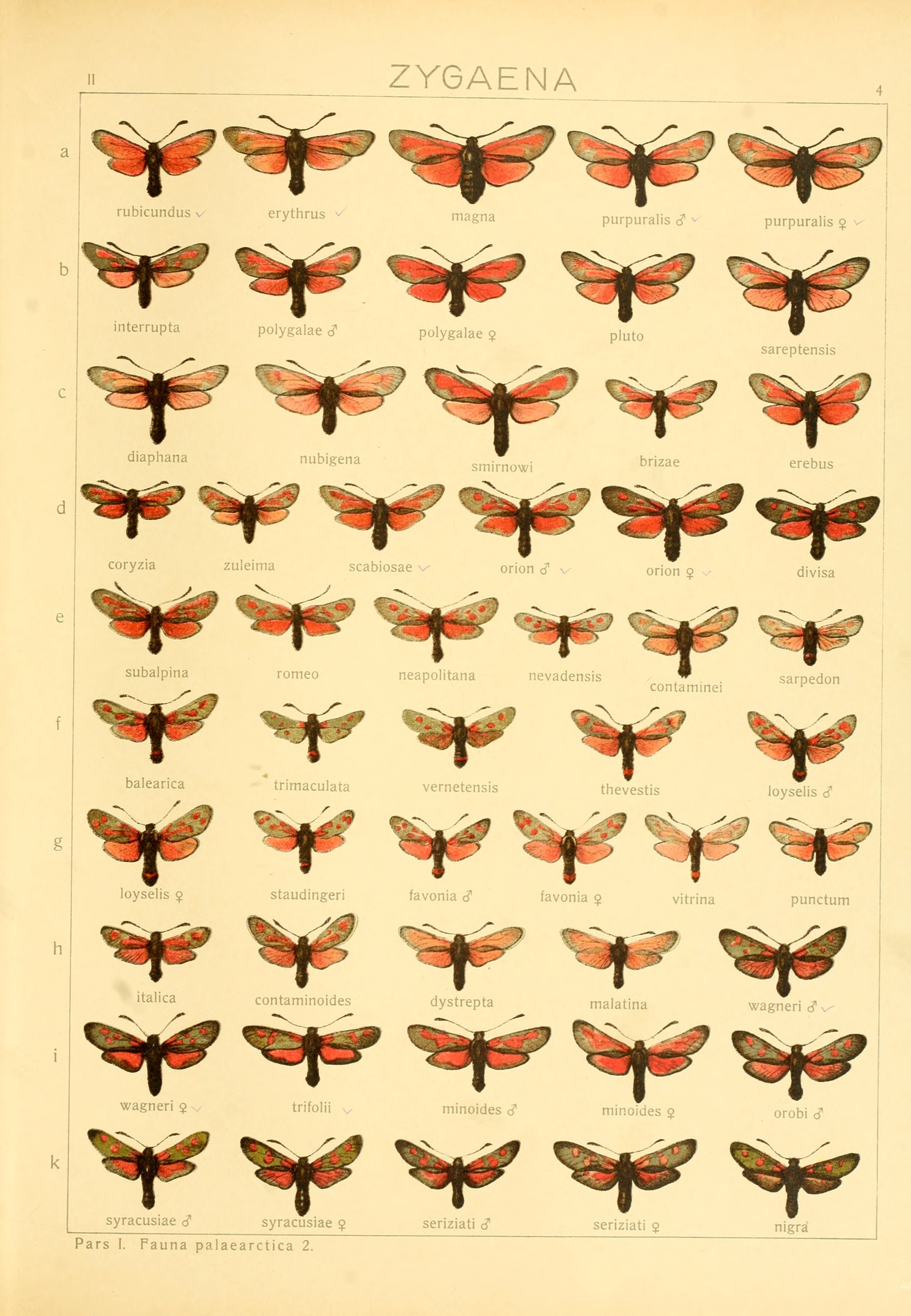
- Zygaena favonia in Seitz f, g

Scientific classification
- Domain: Eukaryota
- Kingdom: Animalia
- Phylum: Arthropoda
- Class: Insecta
- Order: Lepidoptera
- Family: Zygaenidae
- Genus: Zygaena
- Species: Z. favonia

Binomial name
- Zygaena favonia Freyer, 1844.

= Zygaena favonia =

Species of moth

Zygaena favonia is a species of moth in the Zygaenidae family. It is found in the Atlas Mountains, (Morocco, Algeria, Tunisia).In Seitz it is described Z. favonia Frr. (= sarpedon Hbn., cedri Bruand) (4g). This form belongs to a group of North African Burnets the pattern of the forewings of which reminds one much of the preceding species [ Zygaena sarpedon, while the abdomen is red from the middle nearly to the tip, which gives the insect a characteristic aspect and renders it easy to recognize even when it flies quickly past. The whole of Mauretania, everywhere common — ab. vitrina Stgr. (4g) [ now Z. favonia ssp. valentini Bruand, 1846], which I found only at very limited localities, for instance near Constantine and at the cemetery-wall near Batna (Prov. of Constantine), is easily differentiated by the transparent wings. -ab. staudingeri Aust. (4f) [ now Z favonia Freyer, 1844] is similar, but has only a narrow abdominal belt, so that one might mistake the for a small loyselis, if it did not lack the red collar of the latter. — The insect described by Bruand as valentini [ now Z. favonia ssp. valentini Bruand, 1846], in which the red spots are enlarged, may possibly belong to an analogous favonia-form. — The finest form of this group is thevestis Stgr. [now Z. favonia ssp. thevestis Staudinger, 1887 (4f), in which there is a large lobate subapical patch. — All these varieties occur all over Mauretania, on hills, in dry beds of rivulets, and on waste ground. The commonest form is favonia, which is found in June on nearly all the thistles growing at the road-sides and in the fields. The females have an extraordinarily thick body, and apparently scarcely take to the wing before copulation.
