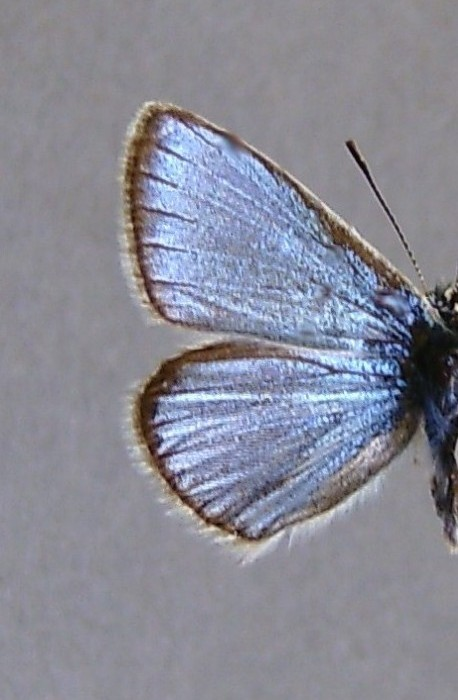
- Male upperside
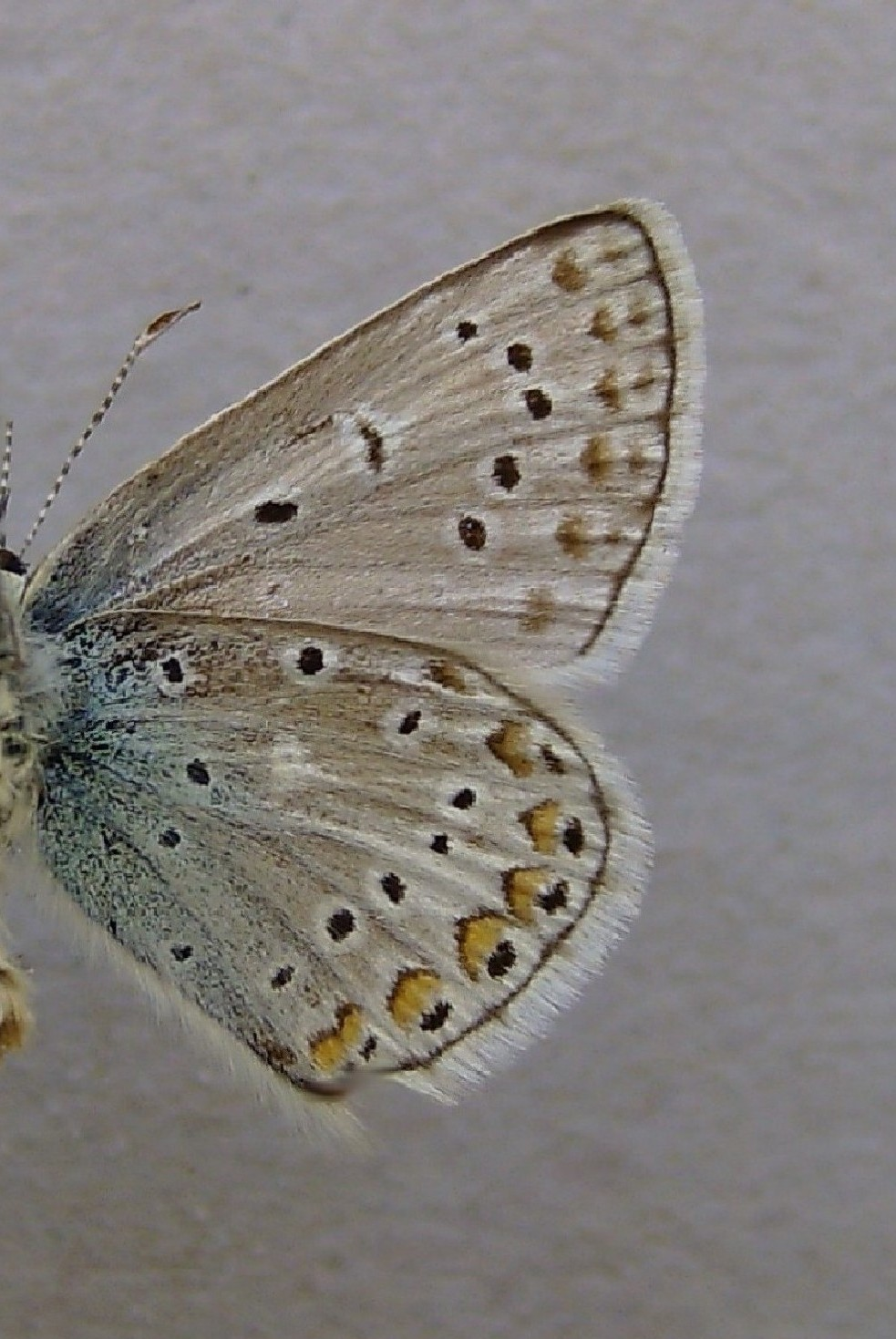
- Male underside

Scientific classification
- Kingdom: Animalia
- Phylum: Arthropoda
- Clade: Pancrustacea
- Class: Insecta
- Order: Lepidoptera
- Family: Lycaenidae
- Genus: Polyommatus
- Species: P. eros

Binomial name
- Polyommatus eros (Ochsenheimer, 1808)

= Polyommatus eros =

Eros blue

Species of butterfly

Polyommatus eros, the Eros blue or common meadow blue, is a species of blue butterfly found in the Palearctic.

== Description in Seitz ==
L. eros O. (= tithonus Hbn.) (80 c, d). male very bright blue, with a metallic gloss like enamel, black margin to the forewing and black distal-marginal spots to the hindwing, these spots contrasting strongly with the pure white fringes. Female brown, sometimes with yellowish red distal-marginal spots. Underside strongly recalling icarus, but male as well as female with distinct white median streak on the hindwing. In the higher mountains of southern Europe as far as the Alps, and in the mountain-districts of Anterior Asia. — In ab. petrividenda Favre the hindwing beneath has no black marginal spots, but instead a white band before the margin, ab. albipicta Schultz has a white discocellular spot on the forewing above instead of the hardly visible black one. ab. caerulescens Oberth. (80 d) are females with bright blue upperside, which occur singly and rarely in Europe, but are said to be a constant form in West China; this, however, is very improbable, and Leech says nothing about it. — erotides Stgr. [P. e. erotides Staudinger, 1892] (80 d), from the mountains of Southern Siberia, is a large, blue-green male-form, with broad black distal margin to the forewing, into which the deep black veins merge. — eroides Friv. (= anteros Frr., everos Gerh.)[P. e. eroides (Frivaldszky, 1835)] is more sky-blue than greenish blue and the largest form of the species after the following one; in Eastern Europe, particularly in Russia, the Balkan Peninsula, westwards extending to Germany, where it occurs in East Prussia and Posen, though only rarely. — The males of the South Russian form boisduvalii H.-Schiff. [P. e. boisduvalii (Herrich-Schäffer, [1843])] (80 d) have again a different blue, being paler, purer, brighter, the outer margin of the forewing is broadly black, the black veins in the apical area of the forewing being thin but sharply marked. — sutleja Moore [now full species Polyommatus sutleja (Moore, 1882)], from Kashmir, is extremely close to boisduvalii, having the same tint of blue, but its black margin is somewhat narrower and the black veins in the apical area of the forewing are not quite so sharply defined. — In amor Stgr. [now full species Polyommatus amor (Lang, 1884)] (80 e), from Ferghana and the Tian-shan, the blue of the upperside of the male has a violet sheen, nearly as in icarus, and the black margin is narrower. — napaea Gr.-Grsh. [P. e. napaea (Grum-Grshimailo, 1891)] has likewise the same blue tint above as icarus, but the black margin is much broader, as is also the costal area of the hindwing. From the Boro-Choro Mts. in Central Asia. — erigone Gr.-Grsh. [now full species Polyommatus erigone (Grum-Grshimailo, 1890)] (80 e), from the Pamir, is considerably smaller; beneath the ocelli are less prominent and the white streak of the hindwing is very distinct. Also the female bears a superficial resemblance to icarus, whose blue colour is almost exactly the same as that of the erigone males obtained at a considerable altitude (13,000 ft.). — pseuderos Moore [now full species Polyommatus pseuderos Moore, 1879] extends still further south, as far as Kashmir. The distal margin with black-grey spots above; the forewing beneath without basal ocelli and the discal row of ocelli more straight. — helena Gr.-Grsh. [now P. e. amdoensis (Wnukowsky, 1929)]from the Sinin Mts., resembles East Russian eroides, but the blue has already a slight tinge of violet, and the black margin is narrower. In the underside the rust-yellow submarginal spots are larger and the dark marginal spots are deeper black and more prominent. Perhaps bilucha Moore [now full species Polyommatus bilucha (Moore, 1884)], from Quetta, outside the Palearctic territory belongs also here — The early stages of the species do not appear to be known. The butterflies occur from June until August; they are not rare and are in the Alps among the most frequent visitors of damp places on the roads. They agree best with argus and argyrognomon in habits and flight.

== Range, taxonomy and subspecies ==
There are two views of the range of eros. Either the distribution area is restricted to the Alps, the Pyrenees, the Apennines, the Balkan Mountains and mountainous regions in Turkey and there are a few subspecies or there are a large number of subspecies which extend across the Himalayas and the Central Asian highlands. In the first view the East Palearctic subspecies are considered full species.

They are predominantly found in high altitudes above 1800 meters. Preferred habitats are flowering grassy slopes in the mountains.

Subspecies of eros sensu lato:

- P. e. eros
- P. e. eroides (Frivaldszky, 1835) Balkans, Asia Minor The Polyommatus eros-eroides complex consists of mostly allopatric populations whose relationships are unclear. P. menelaos Brown, 1996 from Peleponnesos is thought to be closely related to P. eros Ochsenheimer, 1808 by most authors and not to P. eroides Frivaldszky, 1835 which is found in mainland Greece, but the status of P. eroides and P. eros as distinct species is only founded on very slight differences in coloration and in habitat, with P. eros inhabiting mainly higher altitudes above 1800 m.
- P. e. boisduvalii (Herrich-Schäffer, [1843]) East Germany, Czech Republic, Poland, Southeast Europe, Southwest Siberia, North Kazakhstan - Altai
- P. e. napaea (Grum-Grshimailo, 1891) Tian-Shan, Ghissar, Alai
- P. e. erotides Staudinger, 1892 Saur, Altai, South Siberia (mountains), Transbaikalia, Mongolia
- P. e. amdoensis (Wnukowsky, 1929)
- P. e. kamtshadalis (Sheljuzhko, 1933) Polar Urals - Far East, Amur,
- P. e. gansuensis Murayama, 1983
- P. e. extremiorientalis (Kurentzov, 1970) Verkhoyan'ye, Kolyma
- P. e. menelaos Brown, 1976 Greece
- P. e. yildizae Koçak, 1977 Northeast Turkey
- P. e. tshetverikovi Nekrutenko, 1977 Caucasus Major
- P. e. taimyrensis Korshunov, 1982 Taymyr Peninsula, Polar Ural
- P. e. erotulus Nekrutenko, 1985 Azerbaijan, Iran
- P. e. aloisi Bálint, 1987 South Mongolia
- P. e. molleti Carbonell, [1994] Turkey
- P. e. meoticus Zhdanko & Stshurov, 1998 Northwest Caucasus
- P. e. kaabaki Korb, 2000
- P. e. krulikowskyi (Gorbunov, 2001)
- P. e. divisus Churkin, 2003 Mongolia
- P. e. pacificus Stradomsky & Tuzov, 2006 Primorye
- P. e. silvester Korb & Bolshakov, 2011 Poland, Byelorussia, Ukraine

== Biology ==
Inhabits steppe and xerophytic meadows, dry forest edges, valley meadows, dry pine forest edges, steppe pine forest edges and adjoining meadows, alpine stony meadows of high mountains, below - stony-meadow areas. In the mountains it occurs at altitudes from 1700 to 3000 m above sea level. m. It develops in one generation throughout the year flying from the beginning of June to the end of July, in the mountains - from the end of June to August. Food plants of caterpillars: Astragalus, Russian broom (Chamaecýtisus ruthénicus), broom (Cytisus) . The female lays single eggs on leaves. The caterpillar goes through 5 instars in its development. An early caterpillar hibernates. Upon reaching a length of up to 16 mm, the caterpillars stop feeding, seek shelter in the litter, hide under fallen leaves, which are attached to the substrate with threads. After 2–3 days they pupate. The pupa is about 11 mm long.

== Etymology ==
Named in the Classical tradition.In Greek mythology Eros is the god of love.

== See also ==
- List of butterflies of India (Lycaenidae)
