= Johann Christian Gerning =

German banker, art collector and entomologist

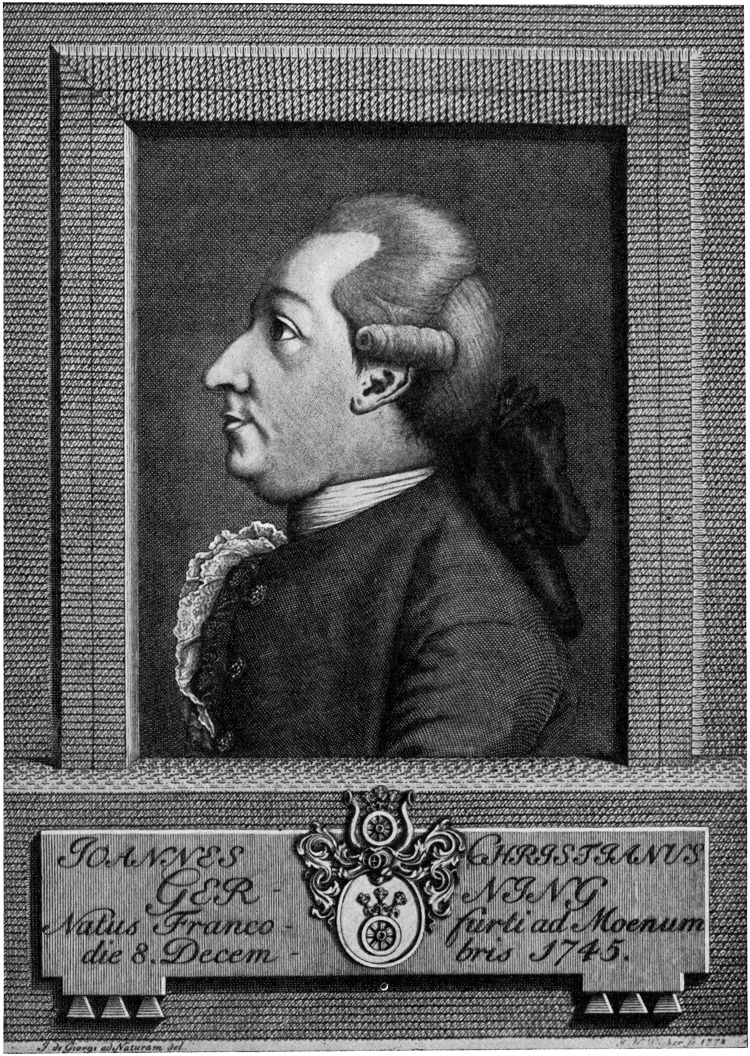
Johann Christian Gerning

Johann Christian Gerning (8 Oktober 1745, Frankfurt – 1802, Frankfurt) was a German banker, art collector, and entomologist.

Gerning lived in Frankfurt. His insect collection was given to Museum Wiesbaden in 1829 by his son Johann Isaak von Gerning. Containing 50,000 specimens in 88 boxes it is beautifully conserved and contains insects given to the Gerning family by Maria Sibylla Merian (1647–1717). Many entomologists worked on the collection and it contains the specimens they based species descriptions on (holotypes).He was a correspondent of the philosopher Johann Georg Hamann.

He was elected as a member of the German National Academy of Sciences Leopoldina in 1789.

Eugenius Johann Christoph Esper's Die Schmetterlinge in Abbildungen nach der Natur mit Beschreibungen (published between 1776 and 1807) is partly based on the Gerner collection
