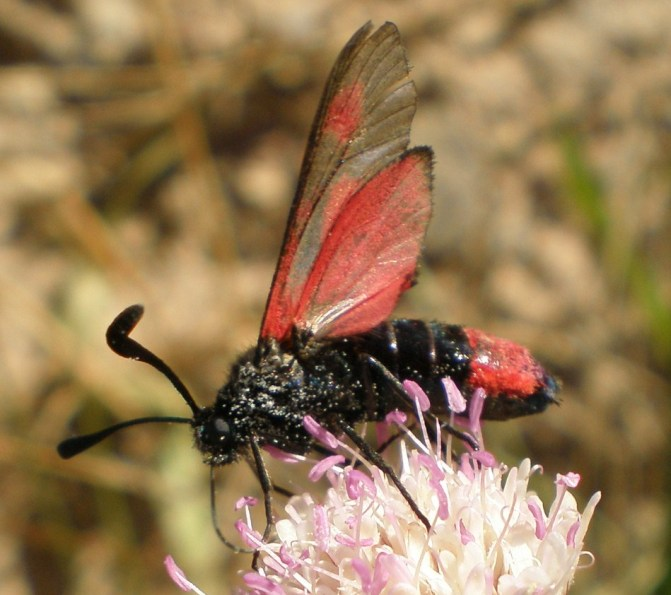

Scientific classification
- Kingdom: Animalia
- Phylum: Arthropoda
- Clade: Pancrustacea
- Class: Insecta
- Order: Lepidoptera
- Family: Zygaenidae
- Genus: Zygaena
- Species: Z. sarpedon

Binomial name
- Zygaena sarpedon (Hübner, 1790)

Synonyms
- Sphinx sarpedon Hübner, 1790; Sphinx trimaculata Esper, 1794; Zygaena balearica Boisduval, [1828]; Zygaena bethunei Reiss, 1927; Zygaena althetica Reiss, 1966; Zygaena benidormica Reiss, 1966; Zygaena escorialica Reiss, 1936; Zygaena zapateri Reiss, 1936; Zygaena andorica G. & H. Reiss, 1976; 'Zygaena carmencita' Oberthür, 1910

= Zygaena sarpedon =

Species of moth

Zygaena sarpedon is a moth of the Zygaenidae family. It is found in France, Italy and on the Iberian Peninsula.

== Technical description and variation (Seitz) ==
Z. sarpedon. This species is the first of a group of red-banded Burnets from the Mediterranean coasts which have only 3 red spots on the forewing: the anterior and the posterior wedge-spots and a small, rounded, drop-like spot corresponding to the distal portion of the central streak. — In the name-typical form, the small sarpedon Hbn., the colour is pale, but distinctly red; hindwing with a vitreous streak from the base to the middle. Spain; South France. — trimaculata Esp. is a little larger; the wings are entirely limpid, the red spots of the forewing being only feebly marked, while the hindwing is almost entirely transparent; Balearic Is., perhaps occasionally also among the previous. — balearica Boisd. (= sarpedon H. Sch.) is considerably larger and more densely scaled than the 2 previous; hindwing beautifully red, narrowly edged with black. Spain, South France, and Piemont. — vernetensis Oberth.[ junior synonym of sarpedon ssp. carmencita Oberthür, 1910 ], from the Pyrenees, has the forewing as in balearica, but the hindwing is black, with two red streaks, one each in and below cell. — Besides these (partly) geographical forms two aberrations have received names, the light yellow one: ab. flava Oberth., and the one with confluent spots: ab. confluens Dziurz. — Larva much variegated, green, with brown subdorsal and lateral lines, a subdorsal row of black dots, black stigmata, and black head edged with reddish; till June on Eryngium. Pupa in a brown cocoon. Imago flying in July and August on stubble and sunny fallow fields. The wingspan is 24–28 mm.

== Biology ==
Adults are on wing from May to August depending on the location. There is one generation per year.

The larvae feed on Eryngium species, including Eryngium campestre, Eryngium bourgatti and Eryngium maritimum. Larvae can be found from April to May in Italy.

== Subspecies ==
- Zygaena sarpedon sarpedon
- Zygaena sarpedon algecirensis Reiss, 1927
- Zygaena sarpedon balearica Boisduval, [1828]
- Zygaena sarpedon hispanica Rambur, 1866
- Zygaena sarpedon carmencita Oberthur, 1910
- Zygaena sarpedon confluenta Reiss, 1927
- Zygaena sarpedon hispanica Rambur, 1866
- Zygaena sarpedon leuzensis Dujardin, 1956
- Zygaena sarpedon lusitanica Reiss, 1936
- Zygaena sarpedon pictonorum Bernardi & Viette 1959
- Zygaena sarpedon variabilis Burgeff 1926
- Zygaena sarpedon xerophila Dujardin 1956
