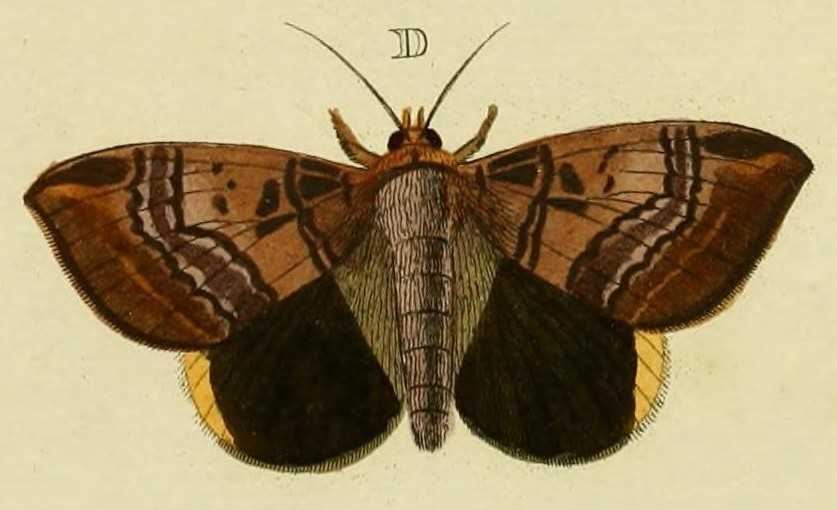
- Acanthodelta ezea

Scientific classification
- Kingdom: Animalia
- Phylum: Arthropoda
- Class: Insecta
- Order: Lepidoptera
- Superfamily: Noctuoidea
- Family: Noctuidae (?)
- Subfamily: Catocalinae
- Genus: Acanthodelta; Hampson, 1908

= Acanthodelta (moth) =

Genus of moths

Acanthodelta is a genus of moths of the family Noctuidae. The genus was erected by George Hampson in 1908.

== Species ==
- Acanthodelta accelerans
- Acanthodelta achaea
- Acanthodelta albicilia
- Acanthodelta albifimbria
- Acanthodelta alkilimba
- Acanthodelta angustifascia
- Acanthodelta antemedialis
- Acanthodelta apiciplaga
- Acanthodelta apinigra
- Acanthodelta arabella
- Acanthodelta argilla
- Acanthodelta atrimacula
- Acanthodelta balteata
- Acanthodelta banjonis
- Acanthodelta basalis
- Acanthodelta basilewskyi
- Acanthodelta bergeri
- Acanthodelta boris
- Acanthodelta brunnescens
- Acanthodelta bryoxantha
- Acanthodelta busira
- Acanthodelta caeruleoalba
- Acanthodelta canuta
- Acanthodelta catella
- Acanthodelta catocaloides
- Acanthodelta cerbera
- Acanthodelta chamaeleon
- Acanthodelta chrysopera
- Acanthodelta cinereovirescens
- Acanthodelta cupreitincta
- Acanthodelta cyanobathra
- Acanthodelta cymatias
- Acanthodelta dallolmoi
- Acanthodelta dasybasis
- Acanthodelta debilis
- Acanthodelta definita
- Acanthodelta dejeanii
- Acanthodelta demepa
- Acanthodelta demta
- Acanthodelta derividata
- Acanthodelta determinata
- Acanthodelta diplographa
- Acanthodelta distriga
- Acanthodelta dmoe
- Acanthodelta ebenaui
- Acanthodelta echo
- Acanthodelta ekeikei
- Acanthodelta euryplaga
- Acanthodelta eusciasta
- Acanthodelta exhibens
- Acanthodelta externesignata
- Acanthodelta ezea
- Acanthodelta ezeoides
- Acanthodelta faber
- Acanthodelta faberis
- Acanthodelta fasciculipes
- Acanthodelta ferreotincta
- Acanthodelta finita
- Acanthodelta flexuosa
- Acanthodelta fontainei
- Acanthodelta fulminans
- Acanthodelta fuscosuffusa
- Acanthodelta hieroglyphigera
- Acanthodelta hilaris
- Acanthodelta hircus
- Acanthodelta hypopolia
- Acanthodelta illustrata
- Acanthodelta immunda
- Acanthodelta imperatrix
- Acanthodelta indeterminata
- Acanthodelta indicabilis
- Acanthodelta indistincta
- Acanthodelta infinita
- Acanthodelta ino
- Acanthodelta intercisa
- Acanthodelta intermedia
- Acanthodelta jamesoni
- Acanthodelta janata
- Acanthodelta joiceyi
- Acanthodelta karschi
- Acanthodelta lanipes
- Acanthodelta lantzii
- Acanthodelta lenzi
- Acanthodelta leucopasa
- Acanthodelta leucopera
- Acanthodelta lienardi
- Acanthodelta lienardiana
- Acanthodelta limbata
- Acanthodelta locra
- Acanthodelta lugens
- Acanthodelta lunulata
- Acanthodelta mabillii
- Acanthodelta malagasy
- Acanthodelta mania
- Acanthodelta mariaca
- Acanthodelta marquesanus
- Acanthodelta medioalba
- Acanthodelta medioalbida
- Acanthodelta melicerta
- Acanthodelta melicertella
- Acanthodelta melicertoides
- Acanthodelta mercatoria
- Acanthodelta mezentia
- Acanthodelta mezentinodes
- Acanthodelta ministra
- Acanthodelta monodi
- Acanthodelta mormoides
- Acanthodelta mundissima
- Acanthodelta nigristriata
- Acanthodelta nigrosuffusa
- Acanthodelta nubifera
- Acanthodelta obliqua
- Acanthodelta oblita
- Acanthodelta obscurior
- Acanthodelta obvia
- Acanthodelta ochrocraspeda
- Acanthodelta oedipodina
- Acanthodelta olivaceotincta
- Acanthodelta ophismoides
- Acanthodelta orea
- Acanthodelta orthogramma
- Acanthodelta partita
- Acanthodelta partitana
- Acanthodelta pentasema
- Acanthodelta phaeobasis
- Acanthodelta poliopasta
- Acanthodelta praestans
- Acanthodelta praestantis
- Acanthodelta pretoriae
- Acanthodelta purpurascens
- Acanthodelta radama
- Acanthodelta radamana
- Acanthodelta radamella
- Acanthodelta regularidia
- Acanthodelta renata
- Acanthodelta renimaculata
- Acanthodelta retrorsa
- Acanthodelta reversa
- Acanthodelta richardi
- Acanthodelta rothkirchi
- Acanthodelta rufobrunnea
- Acanthodelta rufotincta
- Acanthodelta russoi
- Acanthodelta saboeaereginae
- Acanthodelta sakaraha
- Acanthodelta sarcopasa
- Acanthodelta schutzei
- Acanthodelta semiflava
- Acanthodelta semiluna
- Acanthodelta senior
- Acanthodelta serva
- Acanthodelta seychellarum
- Acanthodelta seyrigi
- Acanthodelta signipennifera
- Acanthodelta simplex
- Acanthodelta sinistra
- Acanthodelta sordida
- Acanthodelta spectatura
- Acanthodelta stumpffii
- Acanthodelta subvariegata
- Acanthodelta theata
- Acanthodelta thermopera
- Acanthodelta thomensis
- Acanthodelta tigrina
- Acanthodelta tolnaodes
- Acanthodelta tornistigma
- Acanthodelta trapezoides
- Acanthodelta traversii
- Acanthodelta umbrata
- Acanthodelta umbrigera
- Acanthodelta undulata
- Acanthodelta unilinea
- Acanthodelta usitata
- Acanthodelta violaceofascia
- Acanthodelta violascens
- Acanthodelta vulpina
- Acanthodelta xanthodera
- Acanthodelta zabulon
