= Acanthodelta =

Acanthodelta may refer to:

- Acanthodelta (moth), a genus of moth
- Acanthodelta (acanthocephalan), a genus of Acanthocephalan
