= Eilema trispilota =

Scientific classification
- Kingdom: Animalia
- Phylum: Arthropoda
- Clade: Pancrustacea
- Class: Insecta
- Order: Lepidoptera
- Superfamily: Noctuoidea
- Family: Erebidae
- Subfamily: Arctiinae
- Genus: Eilema
- Species: E. trispilota

Binomial name
- Eilema trispilota (Saalmüller, 1880)

Synonyms
- Sozusa trispilota Saalmüller, 1880; Lithosia trispilota Saalmüller, 1880; Eilema pulvigera Toulgoët, 1954

Species of moth

Eilema trispilota is a moth of the subfamily Arctiinae first described by Max Saalmüller in 1880. It is found on Madagascar.

This species has a wingspan of 28–32 mm (1.1–1.3 in).
