= Achaea imperatrix =

Scientific classification
- Kingdom: Animalia
- Phylum: Arthropoda
- Clade: Pancrustacea
- Class: Insecta
- Order: Lepidoptera
- Superfamily: Noctuoidea
- Family: Erebidae
- Genus: Achaea
- Species: A. imperatrix

Binomial name
- Achaea imperatrix (Saalmüller, 1881)

Synonyms
- Ophisma imperatix Saalmüller, 1881

Species of moth

Achaea imperatrix is a species of moth of the family Erebidae. It is found on Madagascar. It features a mottled brown and gray camouflage coloration.

It has a wingspan of 76 mm.

== Publication ==
This species was first described in Max Saalmüller in 1881.
