= Pyrausta posticalis =

Scientific classification
- Kingdom: Animalia
- Phylum: Arthropoda
- Clade: Pancrustacea
- Class: Insecta
- Order: Lepidoptera
- Family: Crambidae
- Genus: Pyrausta
- Species: P. posticalis

Binomial name
- Pyrausta posticalis (Saalmüller), 1880)

Synonyms
- Botys posticalis Saalmüller, 1880; Syllepte posticalis

Species of moth

Pyrausta posticalis is a moth of the family Crambidae. It can be found in Madagascar.

It has a wingspan of 24–27 mm.
