= Phytometra ossea =

Scientific classification
- Kingdom: Animalia
- Phylum: Arthropoda
- Clade: Pancrustacea
- Class: Insecta
- Order: Lepidoptera
- Superfamily: Noctuoidea
- Family: Erebidae
- Genus: Phytometra
- Species: P. ossea

Binomial name
- Phytometra ossea (Saalmüller, 1891)

Synonyms
- Xanthoptera ossea Saalmüller, 1891

Species of moth

Phytometra ossea is a species of moth of the family Erebidae. This species is found in Madagascar.
