= Achaea lenzi =

Scientific classification
- Kingdom: Animalia
- Phylum: Arthropoda
- Clade: Pancrustacea
- Class: Insecta
- Order: Lepidoptera
- Superfamily: Noctuoidea
- Family: Erebidae
- Genus: Achaea
- Species: A. lenzi

Binomial name
- Achaea lenzi (Saalmüller, 1881)

Synonyms
- Ophisma lenzi Saalmüller, 1881

Species of moth

Achaea lenzi is a species of moth of the family Noctuidae first described by Max Saalmüller in 1881. It is found on Madagascar.

The head, thorax and forewings of this species are chocolate coloured. It has a wingspan of 40–42 mm. Saalmüller named this species after the curator of the Lübeck museum, Dr. Heinrich Lenz.
