= Eilema notifera =

Scientific classification
- Kingdom: Animalia
- Phylum: Arthropoda
- Clade: Pancrustacea
- Class: Insecta
- Order: Lepidoptera
- Superfamily: Noctuoidea
- Family: Erebidae
- Subfamily: Arctiinae
- Genus: Eilema
- Species: E. notifera

Binomial name
- Eilema notifera (Saalmüller, 1880)

Synonyms
- Lithosia (Capissa) notifera Saalmüller, 1880

Species of moth

Eilema notifera is a moth of the subfamily Arctiinae first described by Max Saalmüller in 1880. It is found on Madagascar.

== Subspecies ==
- Eilema notifera notifera
- Eilema notifera antsalova Toulgoët, 1960
