= Achaea mercatoria =

Scientific classification
- Kingdom: Animalia
- Phylum: Arthropoda
- Clade: Pancrustacea
- Class: Insecta
- Order: Lepidoptera
- Superfamily: Noctuoidea
- Family: Erebidae
- Genus: Achaea
- Species: A. mercatoria

Binomial name
- Achaea mercatoria (Fabricius, 1775)

Synonyms
- Noctua mercatoria Fabricius, 1775; Achaea accelerans Walker, 1858; Achaea ino Hübner, 1823; Noctua vulpina Fabricius, 1794

Species of moth

Achaea mercatoria is a moth of the family Erebidae. It is found in countries in tropical Africa and Asia, from South Africa to South East Asia, including the Near East (Saudi Arabia and Yemen) and the islands of Madagascar, Seychelles and Cabo Verde.

It has been identified in north-western Australia only in 1978 from specimen collected back to 1968, which had previously been confused with Achaea serva.

This species has a wingspan of 56-66mm. One of the foodplants of the larvae is Ricinus communis.
