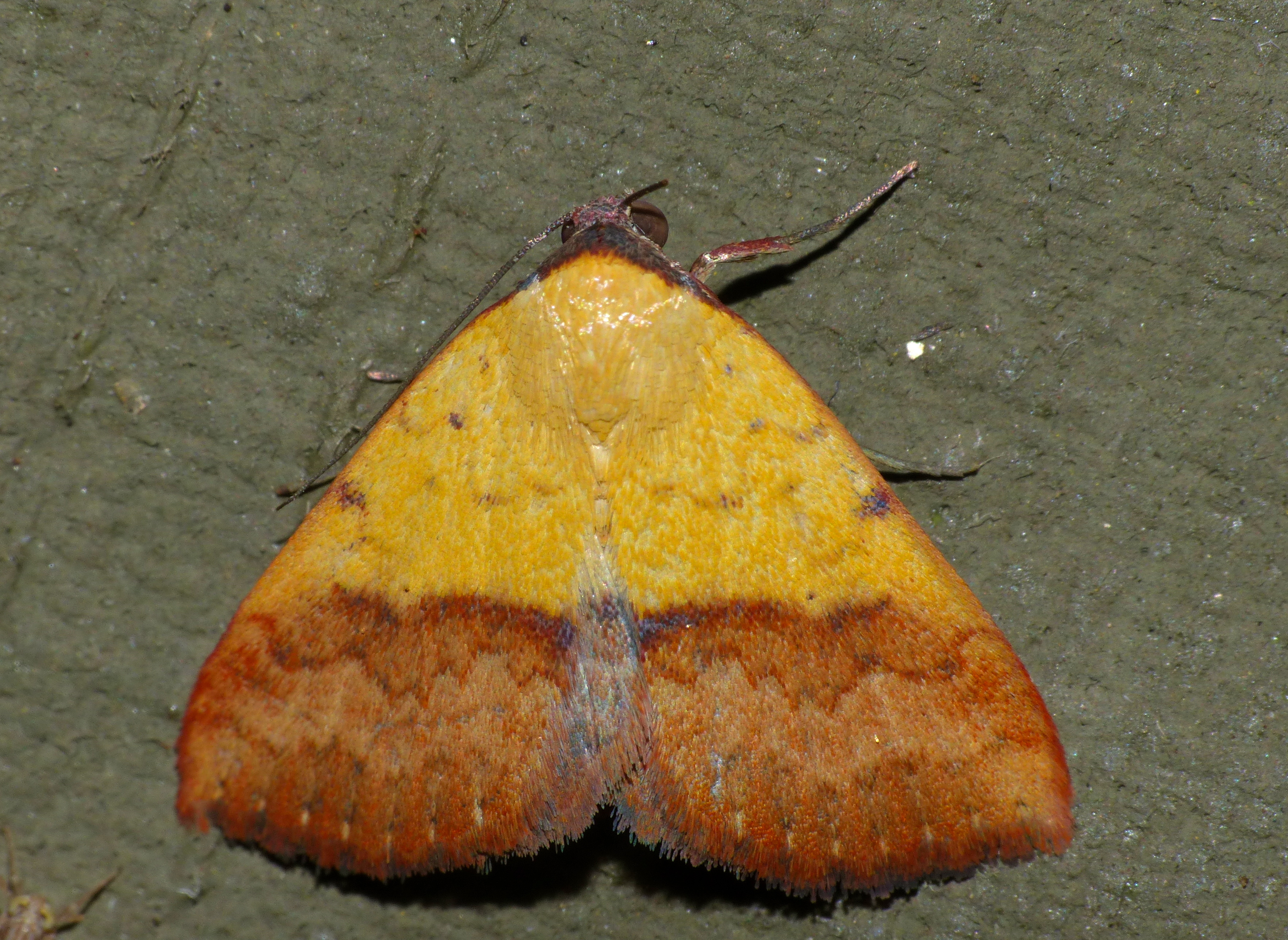

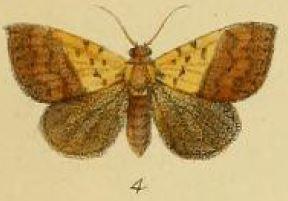

Scientific classification
- Kingdom: Animalia
- Phylum: Arthropoda
- Class: Insecta
- Order: Lepidoptera
- Superfamily: Noctuoidea
- Family: Erebidae
- Genus: Phytometra
- Species: P. duplicalis

Binomial name
- Phytometra duplicalis (Walker, 1866)

Synonyms
- Marimatha duplicalis Walker, 1865; Xanthoptera allecta Schaus, 1893

= Phytometra duplicalis =

Species of moth

Phytometra duplicalis is a species of moth of the family Erebidae which is native to sub-Saharan Africa. It has been found in Cameroon, Sierra Leone, Zambia and South Africa.
