= Achaea macronephra =

Scientific classification
- Kingdom: Animalia
- Phylum: Arthropoda
- Clade: Pancrustacea
- Class: Insecta
- Order: Lepidoptera
- Superfamily: Noctuoidea
- Family: Erebidae
- Genus: Achaea
- Species: A. macronephra

Binomial name
- Achaea macronephra (Berio, 1956)

Synonyms
- Ophiusa macronephra Berio, 1956

Species of moth

Achaea macronephra is a fruit piercing moth of the family Erebidae. It is found in Congo.
