= Phytometra obliqualis =

Scientific classification
- Domain: Eukaryota
- Kingdom: Animalia
- Phylum: Arthropoda
- Class: Insecta
- Order: Lepidoptera
- Superfamily: Noctuoidea
- Family: Erebidae
- Genus: Phytometra
- Species: P. obliqualis

Binomial name
- Phytometra obliqualis (Dyar, 1912)

Species of moth

Phytometra obliqualis is a species of moth in the family Erebidae. It is found in North America.

The MONA or Hodges number for Phytometra obliqualis is 8483.
