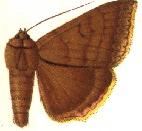

Scientific classification
- Kingdom: Animalia
- Phylum: Arthropoda
- Class: Insecta
- Order: Lepidoptera
- Superfamily: Noctuoidea
- Family: Erebidae
- Genus: Achaea
- Species: A. sordida

Binomial name
- Achaea sordida (Walker, 1865)

Synonyms
- Achaea pretoriae (Distant, 1892); Ophisma sordida Walker, 1865; Ophisma pretoriae Distant, 1892

= Achaea sordida =

Species of moth

Achaea sordida is a species of moth of the family Erebidae first described by Francis Walker in 1865. It is found in Africa, including South Africa and Eswatini.
