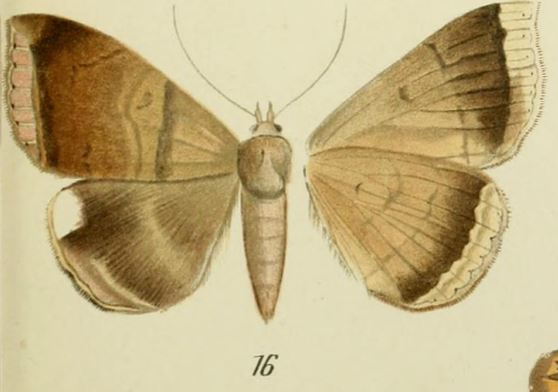

Scientific classification
- Kingdom: Animalia
- Phylum: Arthropoda
- Clade: Pancrustacea
- Class: Insecta
- Order: Lepidoptera
- Superfamily: Noctuoidea
- Family: Erebidae
- Genus: Achaea
- Species: A. mormoides

Binomial name
- Achaea mormoides Walker, 1858

Synonyms
- Achaea schuetzei Bryk, 1915; Achaea mania Felder & Rogenhofer, 1874

= Achaea mormoides =

Species of moth

Achaea mormoides is a species of moth of the family Erebidae.

== Distribution ==
It is found in Africa, including Angola, Nigeria, Ghana, Congo, Sierra Leone, South Africa, and Zambia.
