= Achaea nigristriata =

Scientific classification
- Kingdom: Animalia
- Phylum: Arthropoda
- Class: Insecta
- Order: Lepidoptera
- Superfamily: Noctuoidea
- Family: Erebidae
- Genus: Achaea
- Species: A. nigristriata

Binomial name
- Achaea nigristriata Laporte, 1979

Species of moth

Achaea nigristriata is a species of moth of the family Erebidae. It is found in Tanzania.

This species has a wingspan from 55mm and a length of the forewings of 25mm.
