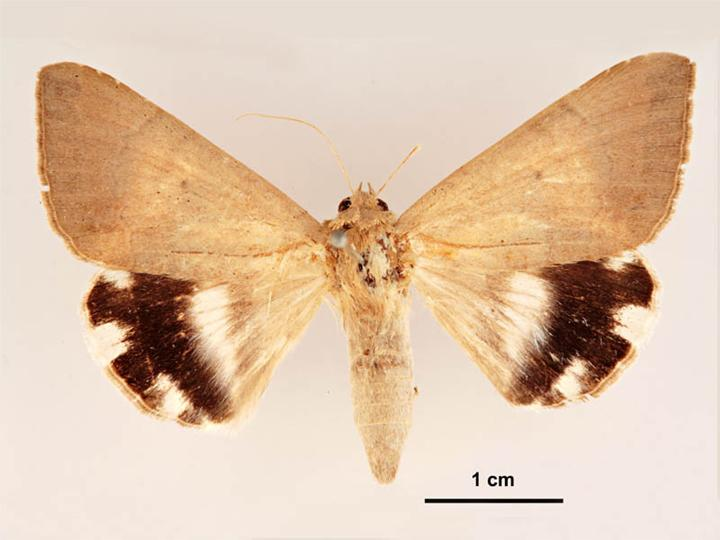
- Male dorsal view
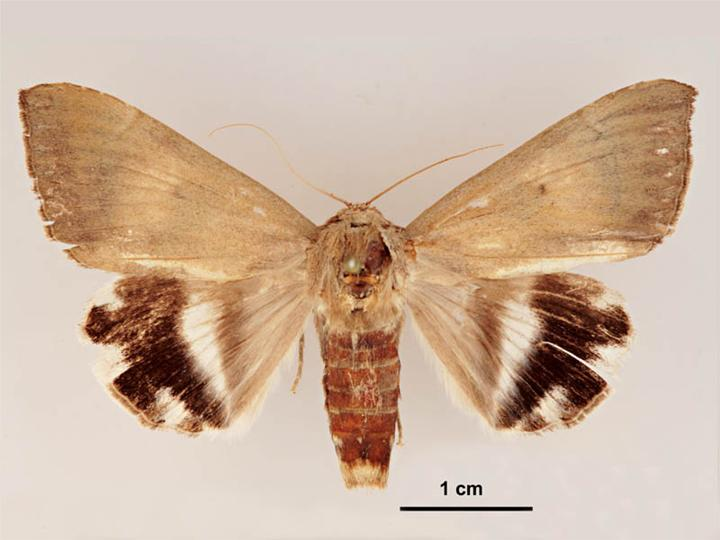
- Female dorsal view

Scientific classification
- Kingdom: Animalia
- Phylum: Arthropoda
- Class: Insecta
- Order: Lepidoptera
- Superfamily: Noctuoidea
- Family: Erebidae
- Genus: Achaea
- Species: A. argilla

Binomial name
- Achaea argilla C. Swinhoe, 1901

Synonyms
- Geria argilla

= Achaea argilla =

Species of moth

Achaea argilla, the plain looper, is a moth of the family Erebidae first described by Charles Swinhoe in 1901. It is found in the northern half of Australia, especially in drier inland locations.

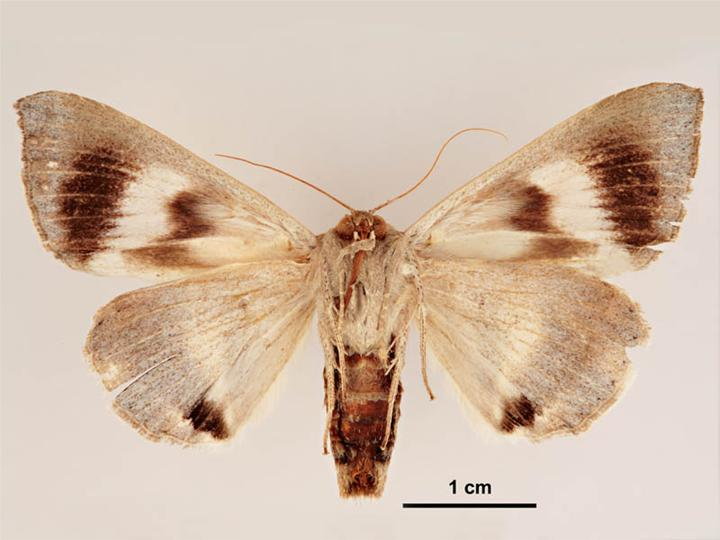
Female ventral view

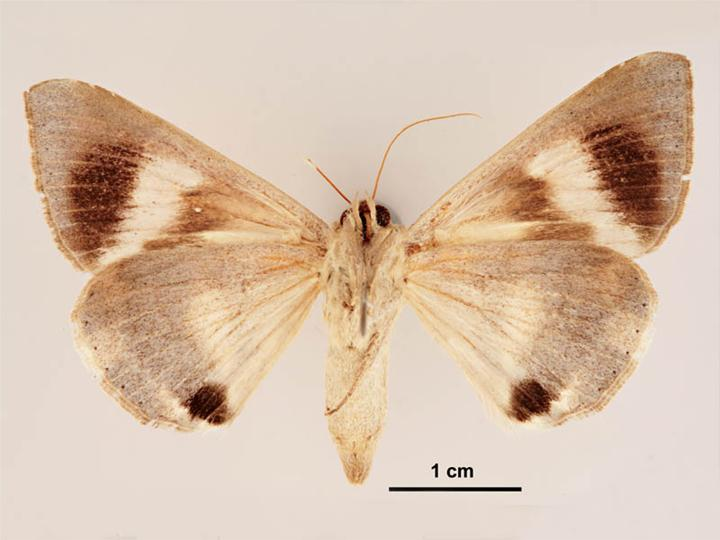
Male ventral view

The wingspan is about 50 mm.

The larvae feed on Breynia oblongifolia and Euphorbia species.

Pupation takes place in a cocoon.
