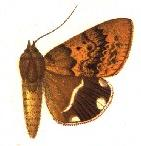

Scientific classification
- Kingdom: Animalia
- Phylum: Arthropoda
- Clade: Pancrustacea
- Class: Insecta
- Order: Lepidoptera
- Superfamily: Noctuoidea
- Family: Erebidae
- Genus: Achaea
- Species: A. violaceofascia

Binomial name
- Achaea violaceofascia (Saalmüller, 1891)

Synonyms
- Achaea seychellarum Holland, 1896; Achaea richardi Viette, 1975; Achaea immunda Holland, 1896; Dysgonia violaceofascia Saalmüller, 1891; Acanthodelta violaceofascia (Saalmüller 1891)

= Achaea violaceofascia =

Species of moth

Achaea violaceofascia is a species of moth of the family Erebidae first described by Max Saalmüller in 1891. It is found much of western Africa and on islands in the Indian Ocean.
