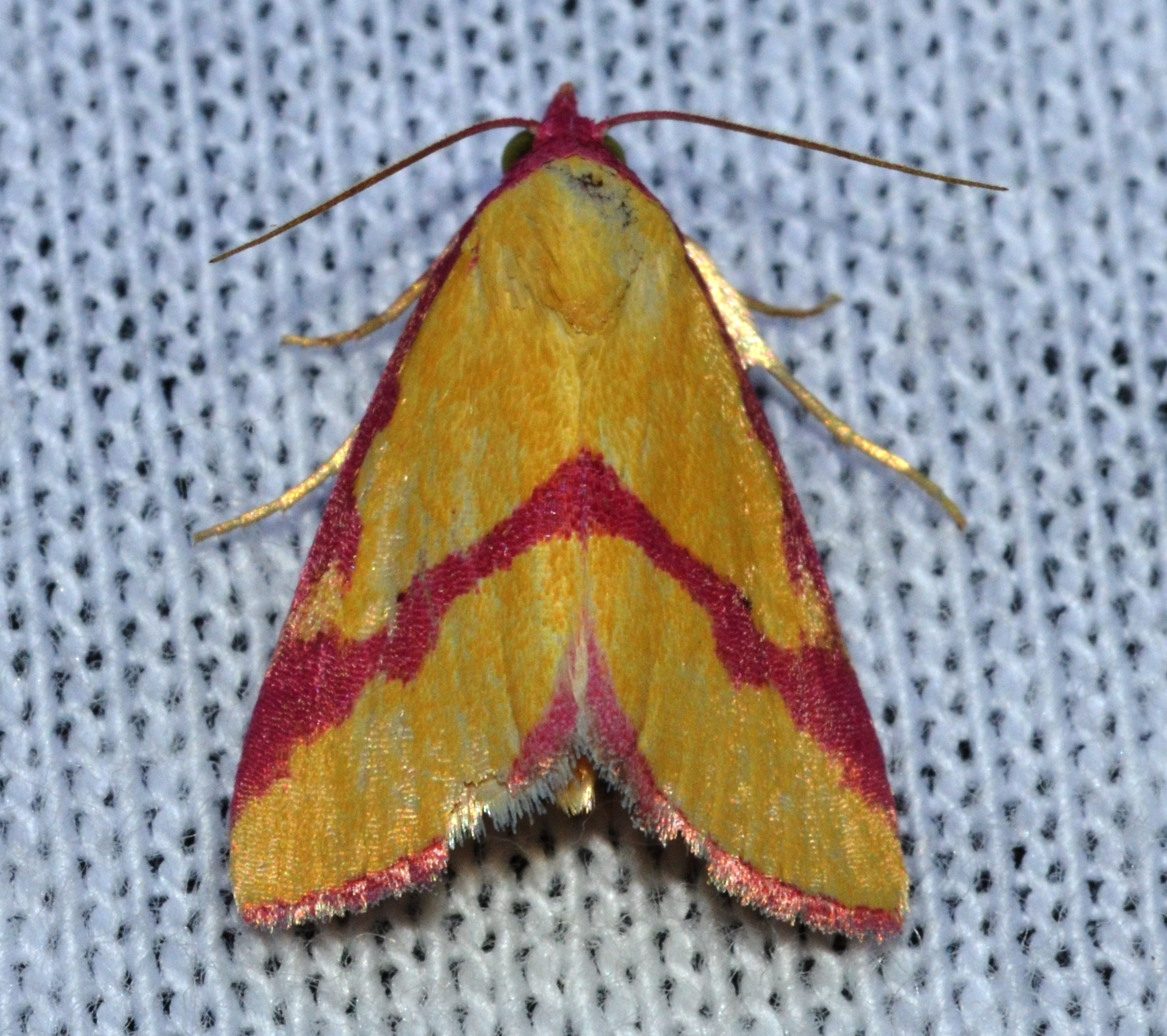

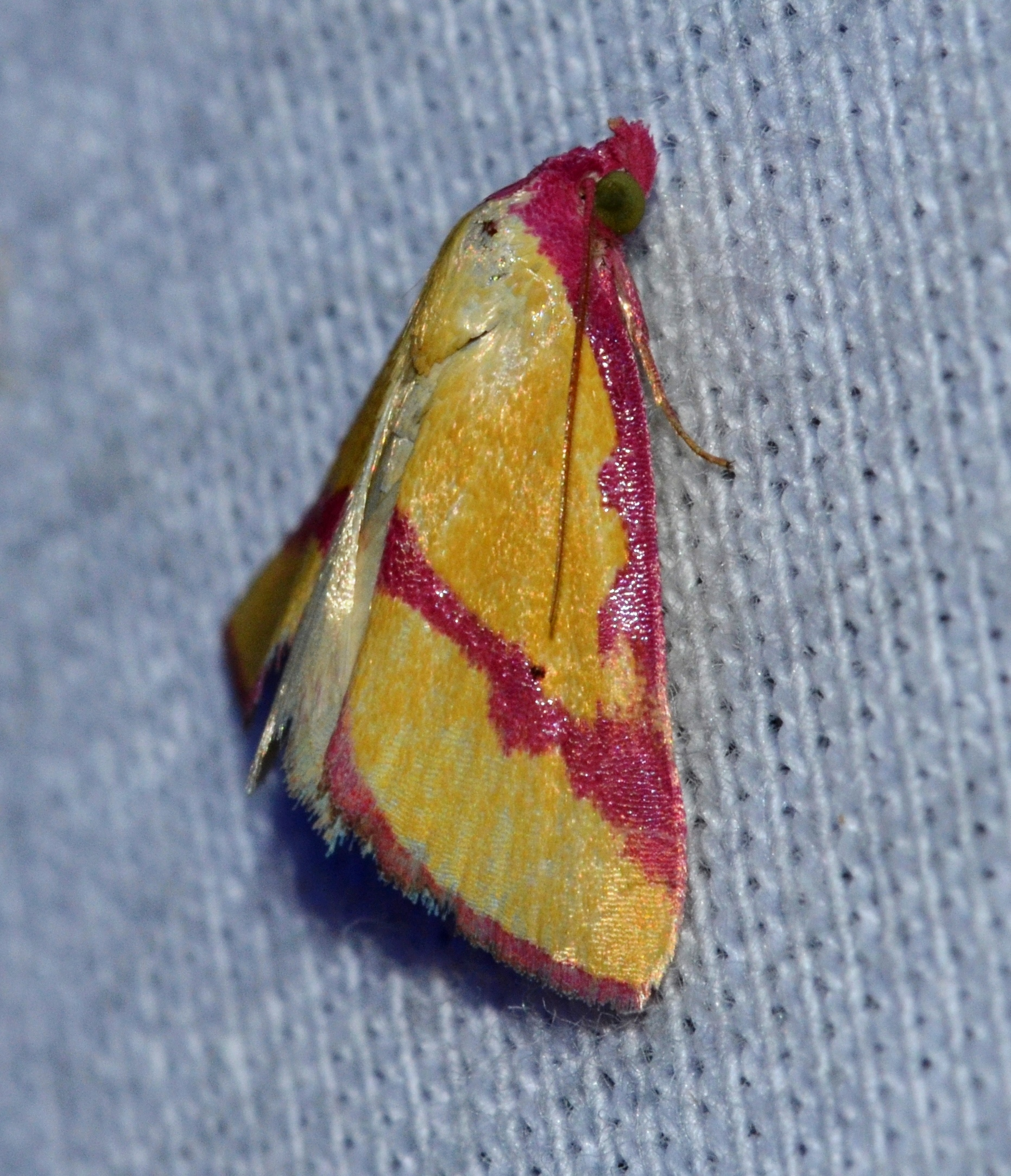

Scientific classification
- Domain: Eukaryota
- Kingdom: Animalia
- Phylum: Arthropoda
- Class: Insecta
- Order: Lepidoptera
- Superfamily: Noctuoidea
- Family: Erebidae
- Genus: Phytometra
- Species: P. ernestinana

Binomial name
- Phytometra ernestinana (Blanchard, 1840)

Synonyms
- Nanthilda ernestinana Blanchard, 1940; Xanthoptera coccinifascia Grote, 1873

= Phytometra ernestinana =

Species of moth

Phytometra ernestinana, Ernestine's moth, is a species of moth of the family Erebidae. It is found in North America, where it has been recorded from Alabama, Arizona, Florida, Georgia, Illinois, Indiana, Iowa, Kansas, Louisiana, Michigan, Mississippi, New York, North Carolina, Ohio, Oklahoma, Ontario, South Carolina, Tennessee, Texas and Wisconsin. It is also present in Cuba.

The wingspan is about 18 mm. Adults have been recorded on wing year round in Florida.
