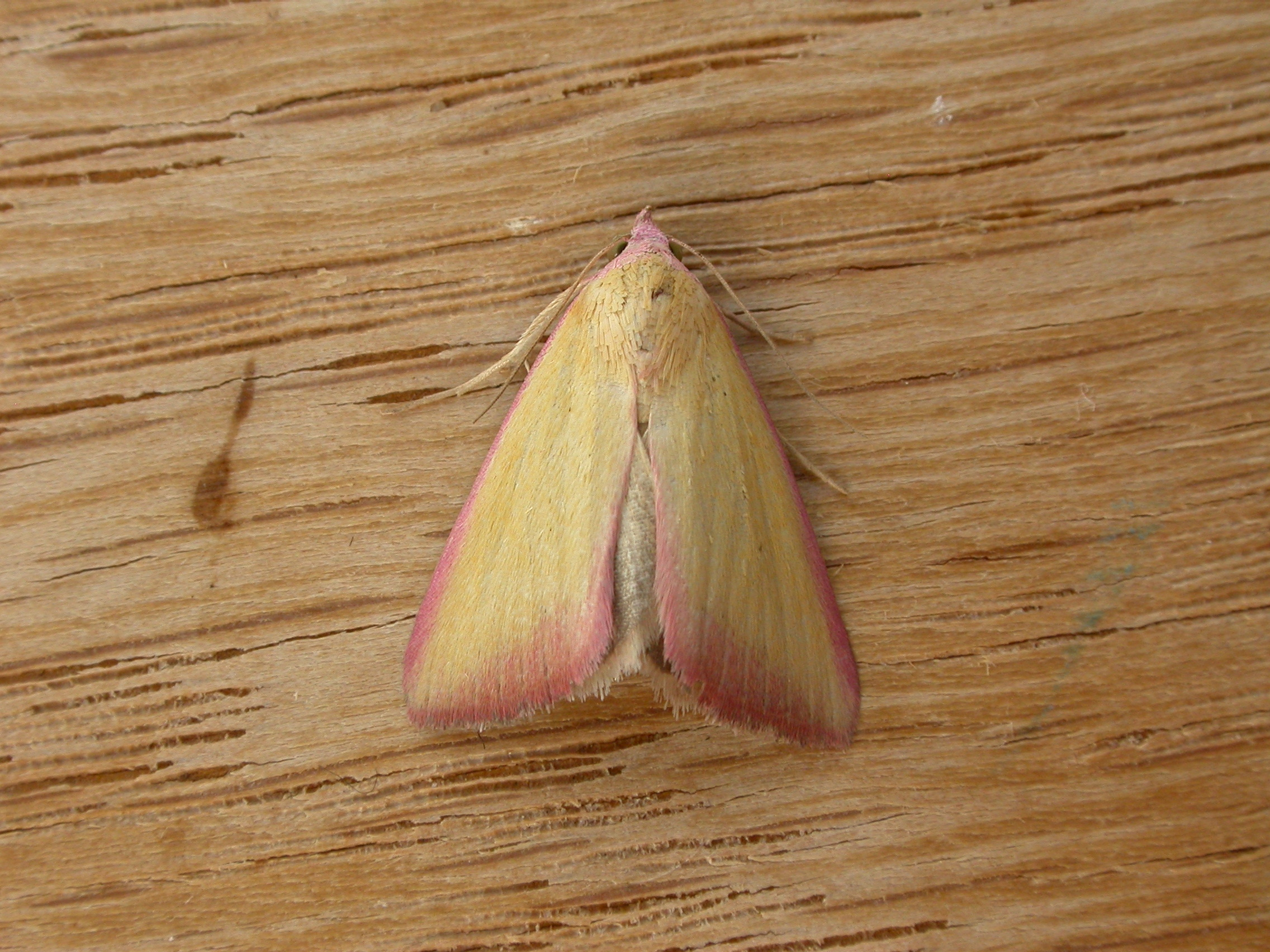

Scientific classification
- Kingdom: Animalia
- Phylum: Arthropoda
- Clade: Pancrustacea
- Class: Insecta
- Order: Lepidoptera
- Superfamily: Noctuoidea
- Family: Erebidae
- Subfamily: Boletobiinae
- Genus: Phytometra; Haworth, 1809

Synonyms
- Nanthilda Blanchard, 1840; Prothymia Hübner, 1823; Prothymnia Leraut, 1997; Pseudomicra Butler, 1892; Pyralidesthes Warren, 1913

= Phytometra =

Genus of moths

Phytometra is a genus of moths of the family Erebidae. The genus was described by Adrian Hardy Haworth in 1809.

== Taxonomy ==
The genus has previously been classified in the subfamily Phytometrinae within Erebidae or in the subfamily Calpinae of the family Noctuidae.

== Species ==
Some species of this genus are:

- Phytometra africana (Snellen, 1872)
- Phytometra apicata Barnes & McDunnough, 1916
- Phytometra bipuncta Stadie & Strutzberg, 2026 (from northern Madagascar)
- Phytometra carnea (Prout A. E., 1922)
- Phytometra coniota (Hampson, 1926)
- Phytometra conicephala (Staudinger, 1870) (from Spain)
- Phytometra curvifera (Hampson, 1926)
- Phytometra duplicalis (Walker, 1866)
- Phytometra ernestinana Blanchard, 1840 – Ernestine's moth
- Phytometra euchroa Hampson, 1918
- Phytometra flavissima (Hacker & Saldaitis, 2010) (from Sokotra)
- Phytometra formosalis Walker, 1866
- Phytometra haemaceps (Hampson, 1910)
- Phytometra haematoessa (Hampson, 1910)
- Phytometra helesusalis (Walker, 1859)
- Phytometra heliriusalis (Walker, 1859)
- Phytometra hypopsamma (Hampson, 1926)
- Phytometra laevis Swinhoe, 1901
- Phytometra lentistriata (Hampson, 1910)
- Phytometra luna Zerny, 1927
- Phytometra magalium (Townsend, 1958)
- Phytometra nigrogemmea Romieux, 1943
- Phytometra nyctichroa (Hampson, 1926)
- Phytometra obliqualis Dyar, 1912
- Phytometra orgiae Grote, 1875
- Phytometra olivescens (Hampson, 1910)
- Phytometra opsiphora (Hampson, 1926)
- Phytometra ossea (Saalmüller, 1891)
- Phytometra pentheus (Fawcett, 1916)
- Phytometra pyralomima (Wiltshire, 1961)
- Phytometra rhodopa (Bethune-Baker, 1911)
- Phytometra rhodarialis Walker, 1859 – pink-bordered yellow moth
- Phytometra sacraria (Felder & Rogenhofer, 1874)
- Phytometra flavissima (Hacker & Saldaitis, 2010) (from Madagascar)
- Phytometra sanctiflorentis Boisduval, 1834
- Phytometra signifera (Hampson, 1926)
- Phytometra silona (Schaus, 1893)
- Phytometra subflavalis (Walker, 1865)
- Phytometra umbrifera (Hampson, 1910)
- Phytometra viridaria Clerck, 1759 – small purple-barred
- Phytometra zotica (Viette, 1956)
