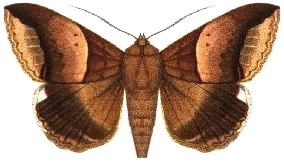

Scientific classification
- Kingdom: Animalia
- Phylum: Arthropoda
- Class: Insecta
- Order: Lepidoptera
- Superfamily: Noctuoidea
- Family: Erebidae
- Genus: Achaea
- Species: A. echo

Binomial name
- Achaea echo (Walker, 1858)

Synonyms
- Achaea mariaca Plötz, 1880; Ophisma echo Walker, 1858

= Achaea echo =

Echo moth

Species of moth

Achaea echo is a species of moth of the family Erebidae. It is found from Equatorial West Africa to South Africa, including Sierra Leone, Ghana and Zimbabwe. The larvae feed on Poaceae and Panicum species, but have also been recorded on Citrus.

== Gallery ==
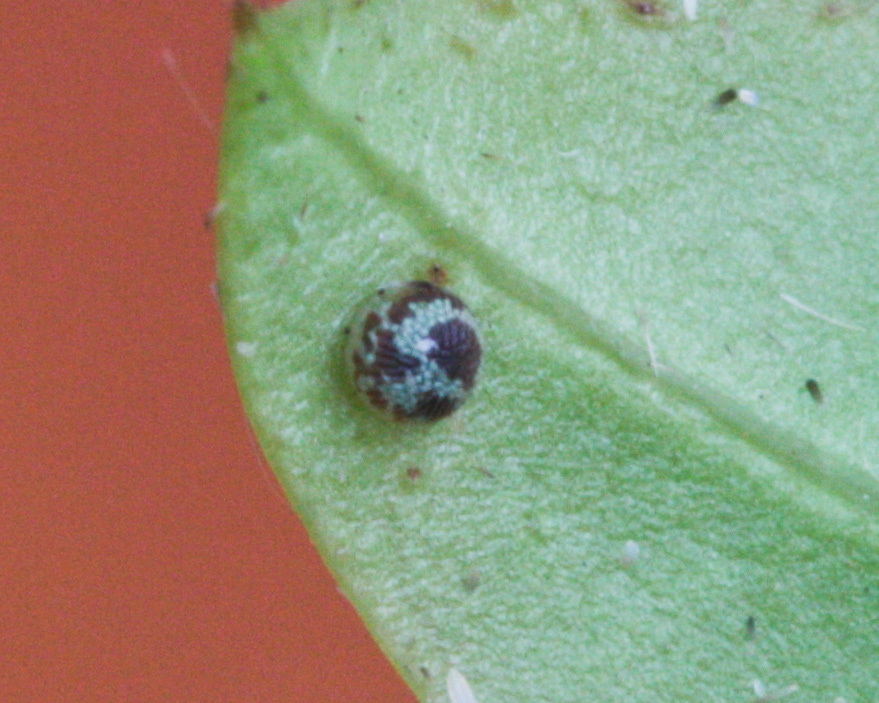
egg

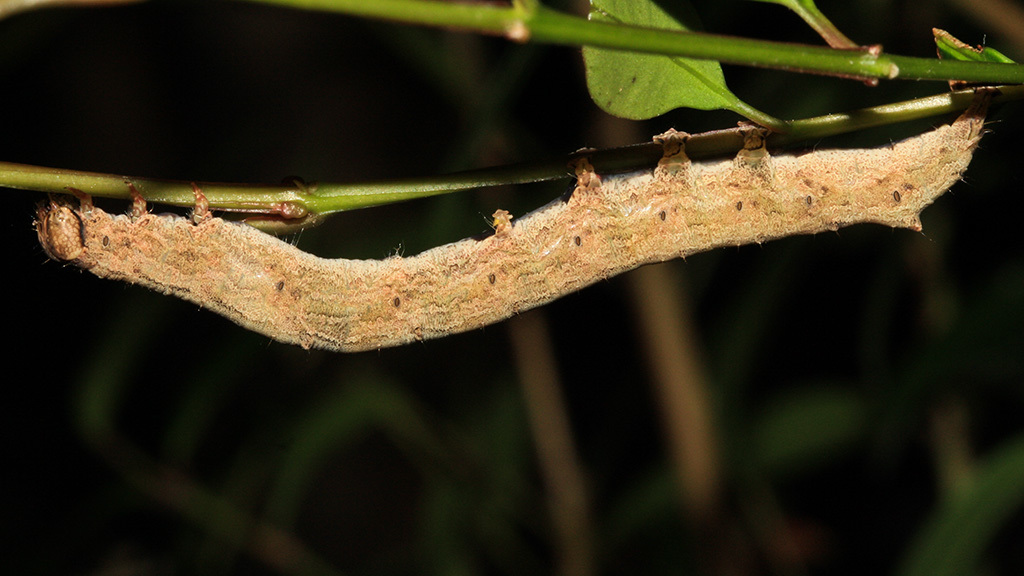
caterpillar

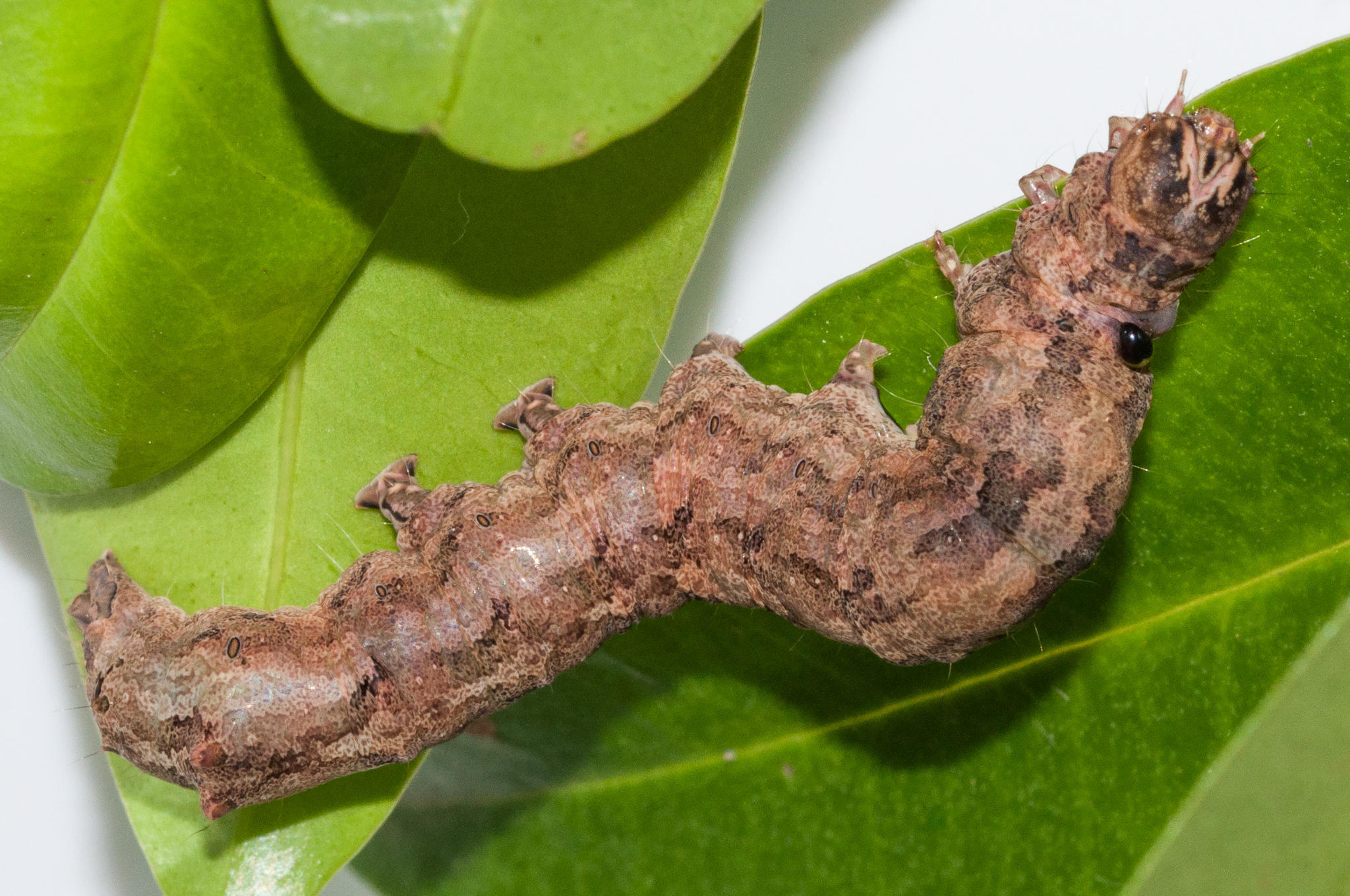
caterpillar

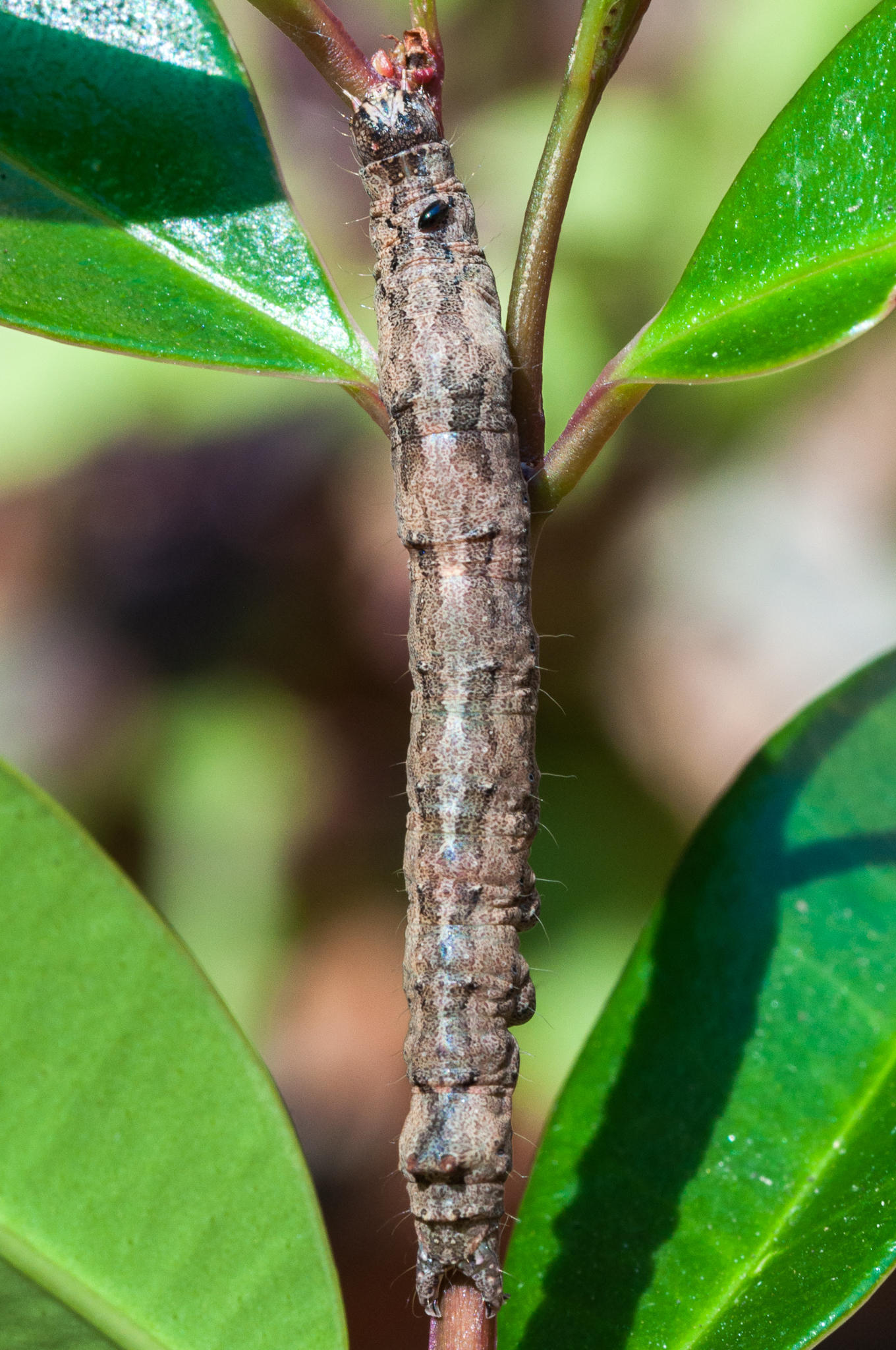
caterpillar

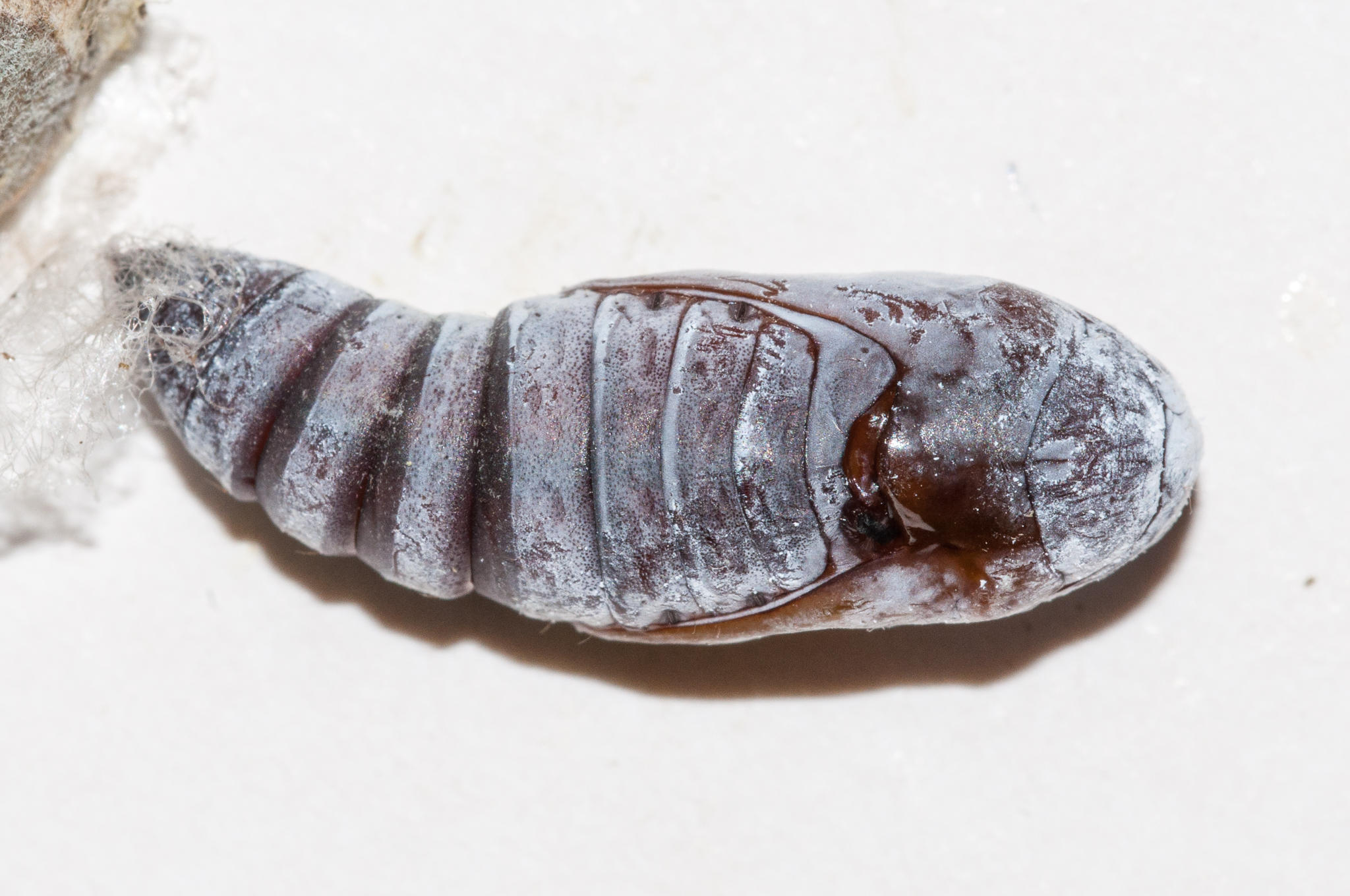
pupa

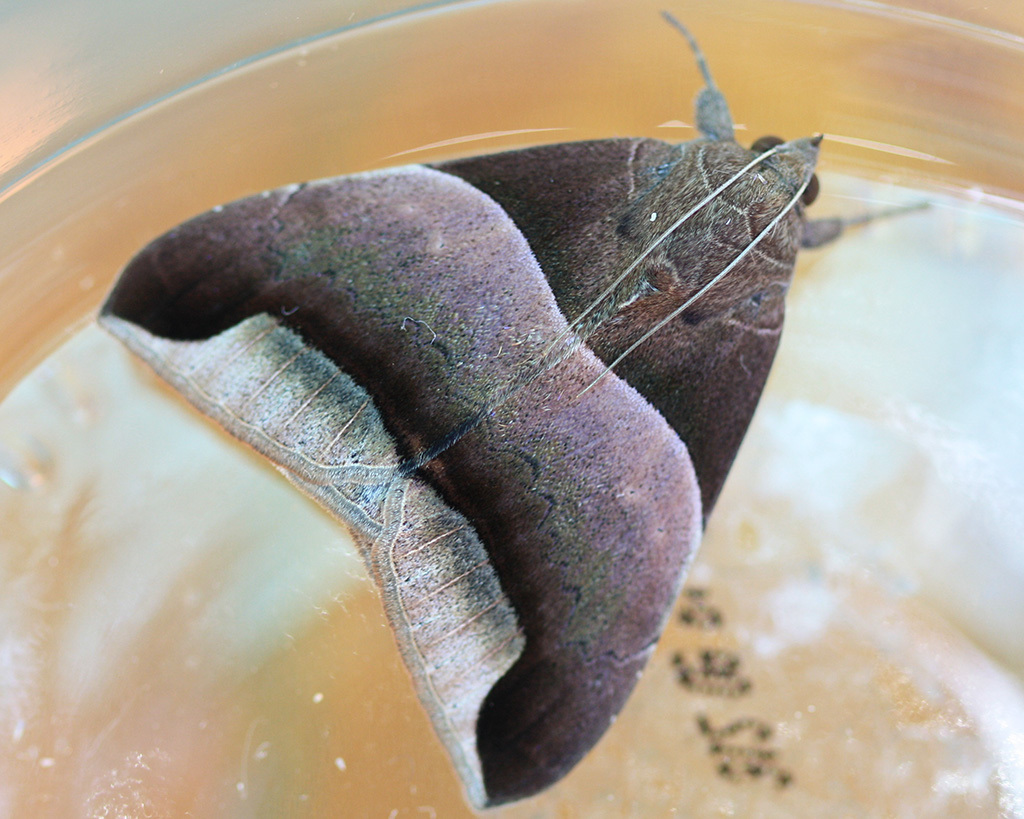
imago
