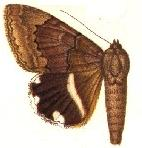

Scientific classification
- Kingdom: Animalia
- Phylum: Arthropoda
- Class: Insecta
- Order: Lepidoptera
- Superfamily: Noctuoidea
- Family: Erebidae
- Genus: Achaea
- Species: A. catella

Binomial name
- Achaea catella Guenée, 1852

Synonyms
- Achaea catilla (lapsus)

= Achaea catella =

Banded achaea

Species of moth

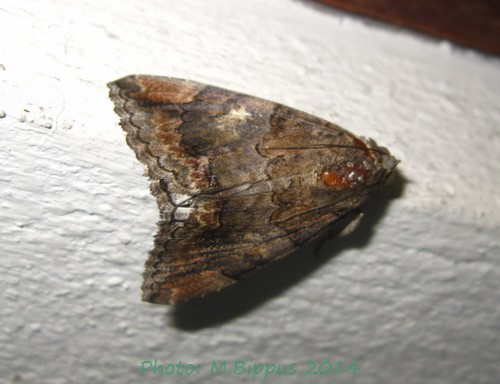

Achaea catella, the banded achaea, is a moth of the family Erebidae. The species was first described by Achille Guenée in 1852. It is found in Africa, including Senegal, South Africa, Réunion and Namibia.
