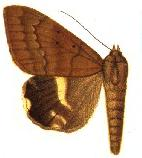

Scientific classification
- Kingdom: Animalia
- Phylum: Arthropoda
- Clade: Pancrustacea
- Class: Insecta
- Order: Lepidoptera
- Superfamily: Noctuoidea
- Family: Erebidae
- Genus: Achaea
- Species: A. catocaloides

Binomial name
- Achaea catocaloides Guenée, 1852

Synonyms
- Achaea exhibens (Walker, 1858); Ophisma exhibens Walker, 1858; Achaea catocaloides virga; Achaea catocaloides rena; Achaea catocaloides nigra; Achaea catocaloides violacea

= Achaea catocaloides =

Species of moth

Achaea catocaloides is a species of moth of the family Erebidae first described by Achille Guenée in 1852. It is found in Liberia, Guinea, Benin, Dahomey, Ivory Coast, Kenya and Uganda.

There are up to two generations per year.

In December 2008 and January 2009, there was a serious outbreak of A. catocaloides in the border region of Liberia and Guinea, causing the Liberian government to declare a state of emergency. The feces of the caterpillars made local streams undrinkable.

The larvae normally feed on various trees, such as Dahoma trees, but can become a pest on agricultural crops like coffee, cocoa, citrus, plantain, banana and cassava.

The larvae, known as minsangula or lukunku in D.R. Congo and mindelemoka or muchangumuna in Congo Republic, are eaten and frequently sold in markets.
