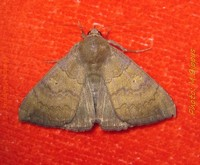

Scientific classification
- Kingdom: Animalia
- Phylum: Arthropoda
- Class: Insecta
- Order: Lepidoptera
- Superfamily: Noctuoidea
- Family: Erebidae
- Genus: Achaea
- Species: A. finita

Binomial name
- Achaea finita (Guenée, 1852)

Synonyms
- Ophisma finita Guenée, 1852; Ophisma limbata Felder & Rogenhofer, 1874; Achaea limbata (Felder & Rogenhofer, 1874)

= Achaea finita =

Finite achaea

Species of moth

Achaea finita, the finite achaea, is a moth in the family Erebidae. It is widespread in Sub-Saharan Africa (including the Horn of Africa, Madagascar) and has also been recorded on Réunion and Mauritius as well as in the Arabian Peninsula (Yemen, Saudi Arabia).

The larvae have been recorded feeding on Arachis hypogaea, Citrus species, Hibiscus sabdariffa, Phaseolus species, Pisum sativum, Ricinus communis and Solanum tuberosum.
