= Achaea orbigera =

Scientific classification
- Kingdom: Animalia
- Phylum: Arthropoda
- Class: Insecta
- Order: Lepidoptera
- Superfamily: Noctuoidea
- Family: Erebidae
- Genus: Achaea
- Species: A. orbigera

Binomial name
- Achaea orbigera Gaede, 1917

Species of moth

Achaea orbigera is a species of moth of the family Erebidae. It is found in Papua New Guinea.

The female of this species has a wingspan of 66 mm (2.6 in).
