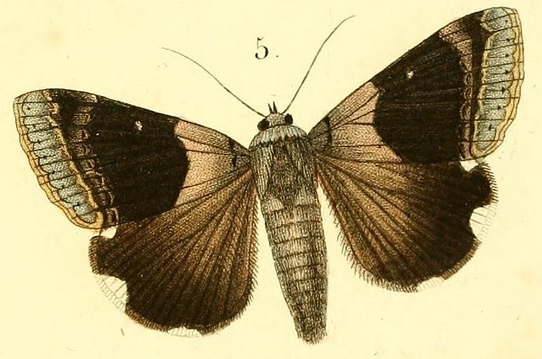

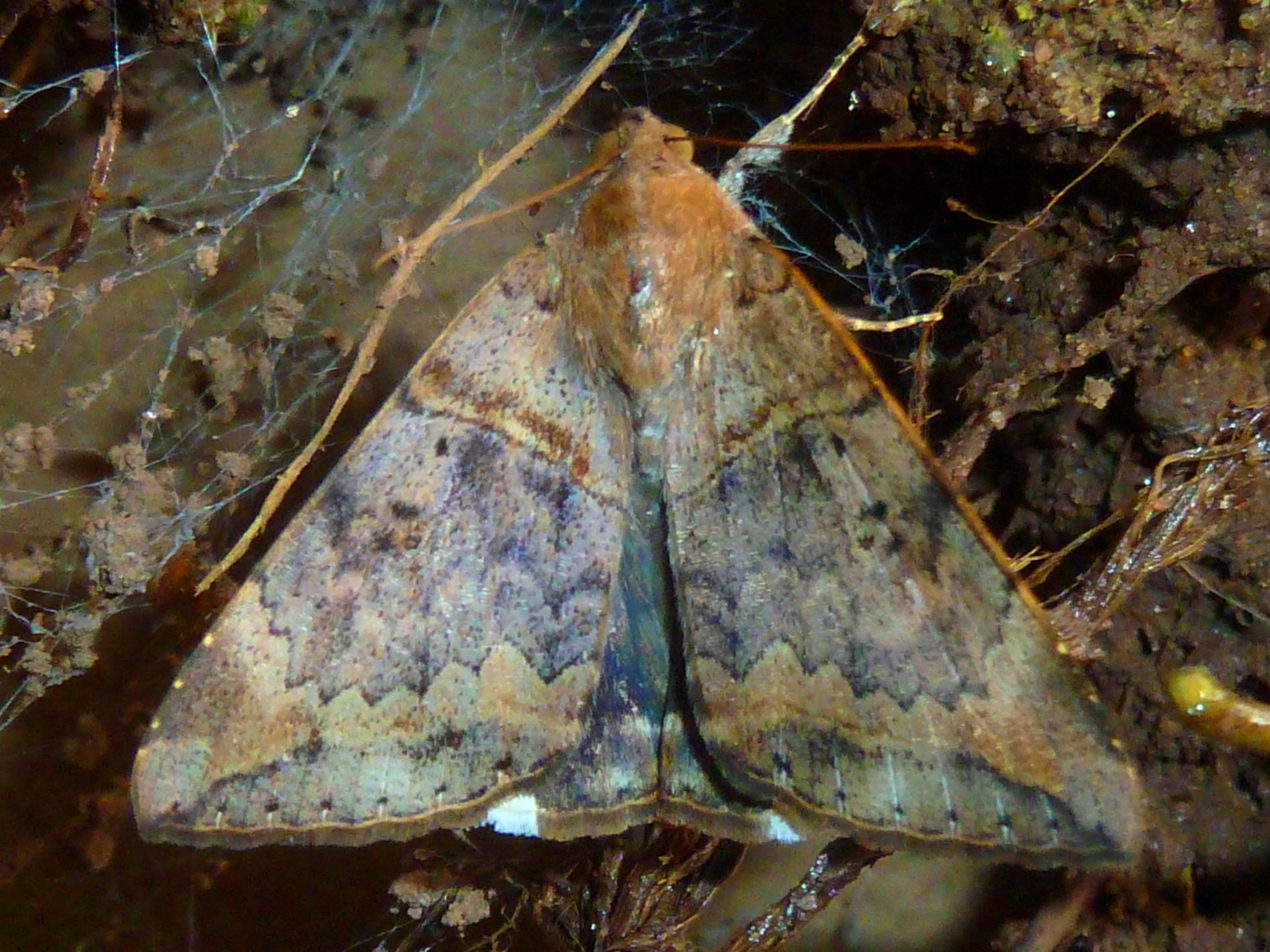

Scientific classification
- Kingdom: Animalia
- Phylum: Arthropoda
- Clade: Pancrustacea
- Class: Insecta
- Order: Lepidoptera
- Superfamily: Noctuoidea
- Family: Erebidae
- Genus: Achaea
- Species: A. lienardi

Binomial name
- Achaea lienardi (Boisduval, 1833)

Synonyms
- Ophiusa lienardi Boisduval, 1833; Ophiusa cerbera Guenée, 1852; Achaea chamaeleon Guenée, 1852; Ophisma externesignata Saalmüller, 1880; Achaea hilaris Plötz, 1880; Achaea locra Plötz, 1880; Achaea ophismoides Walker, 1869; Achaea partita Walker, 1869; Achaea spectatura Walker, 1858; Ophiusa zabulon Guenée, 1852

= Achaea lienardi =

Lienard's achaea

Species of moth

Achaea lienardi, or Lienard's achaea, is a fruit piercing moth of the family Erebidae first described by Jean Baptiste Boisduval in 1833. It is found in most countries in tropical Africa from Egypt to South Africa, including the islands of Madagascar, Réunion and Mauritius. The larva may feed on various plants, belonging to the genera Maerua, Pappea, Rhus, Citrus, Schotia, Sideroxylon, Ptaeroxylon, Acacia, Allophylus, Croton, Pinus and Ricinus.
