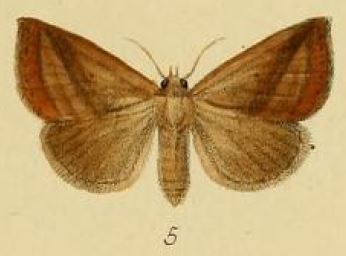

Scientific classification
- Domain: Eukaryota
- Kingdom: Animalia
- Phylum: Arthropoda
- Class: Insecta
- Order: Lepidoptera
- Superfamily: Noctuoidea
- Family: Erebidae
- Genus: Phytometra
- Species: P. silona

Binomial name
- Phytometra silona (Schaus & Clements, 1893)

Synonyms
- Calobochyla silona Schaus & Clements, 1893

= Phytometra silona =

Species of moth

Phytometra silona is a species of moth of the family Erebidae described by William Schaus and W. G. Clements in 1893. It is found in Sierra Leone and in South Africa.
