= Phytometra apicata =

Scientific classification
- Kingdom: Animalia
- Phylum: Arthropoda
- Clade: Pancrustacea
- Class: Insecta
- Order: Lepidoptera
- Superfamily: Noctuoidea
- Family: Erebidae
- Genus: Phytometra
- Species: P. apicata

Binomial name
- Phytometra apicata Barnes & McDunnough, 1916

Species of moth

Phytometra apicata is a moth in the family Erebidae described by William Barnes and James Halliday McDunnough in 1916. It is found in North America.

The MONA or Hodges number for Phytometra apicata is 8482.
