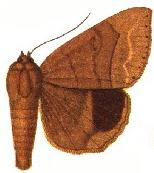

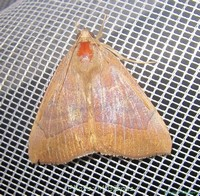

Scientific classification
- Kingdom: Animalia
- Phylum: Arthropoda
- Clade: Pancrustacea
- Class: Insecta
- Order: Lepidoptera
- Superfamily: Noctuoidea
- Family: Erebidae
- Genus: Achaea
- Species: A. faber

Binomial name
- Achaea faber Holland, 1894

= Achaea faber =

Species of moth

Achaea faber is a species of moth of the family Erebidae. It is found in large parts of Africa, including Congo, Gabon, Ghana, Madagascar, Réunion, South Africa and Tanzania.

The larvae have been recorded on banana, citrus and mango.
