= Achaea dmoe =

Scientific classification
- Kingdom: Animalia
- Phylum: Arthropoda
- Clade: Pancrustacea
- Class: Insecta
- Order: Lepidoptera
- Superfamily: Noctuoidea
- Family: Erebidae
- Genus: Achaea
- Species: A. dmoe

Binomial name
- Achaea dmoe L. B. Prout, 1919

Species of moth

Achaea dmoe is a species of moth of the family Erebidae first described by Louis Beethoven Prout in 1919. It is found on Madagascar.

This species has a wingspan of 56–62 mm.

Head, thorax and the base of the abdomen are yellowish brown, sometimes with a rufous tinge. Abdomen otherwise strongly mixed with dark grey. The forewings are moderately broad, costa curved towards the apex, light yellow brown or red brown with strong vinaceous reflections, at least in the median area. The distal area and the costal edge are generally more yellow. It has a white spot close to the base, lines grey or blackish and interrupted. The hindwings are dusky greyish ochreous becoming almost black distally between costa and M^{2}, a small whitish apical spot, and an ill-defined light ochreous-brown band.

The four holotypes were provided from central Madagascar from an elevation of 2,500 feet (760 m) between January and March 1911 by F. B. Pratt.
