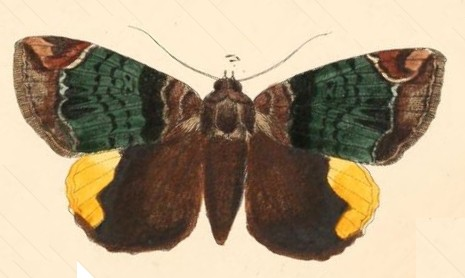

Scientific classification
- Kingdom: Animalia
- Phylum: Arthropoda
- Class: Insecta
- Order: Lepidoptera
- Superfamily: Noctuoidea
- Family: Erebidae
- Genus: Achaea
- Species: A. radama

Binomial name
- Achaea radama Felder & Rogenhofer, 1874

= Achaea radama =

Species of moth

Achaea radama is a species of moth of the family Erebidae. It is found in Madagascar.
