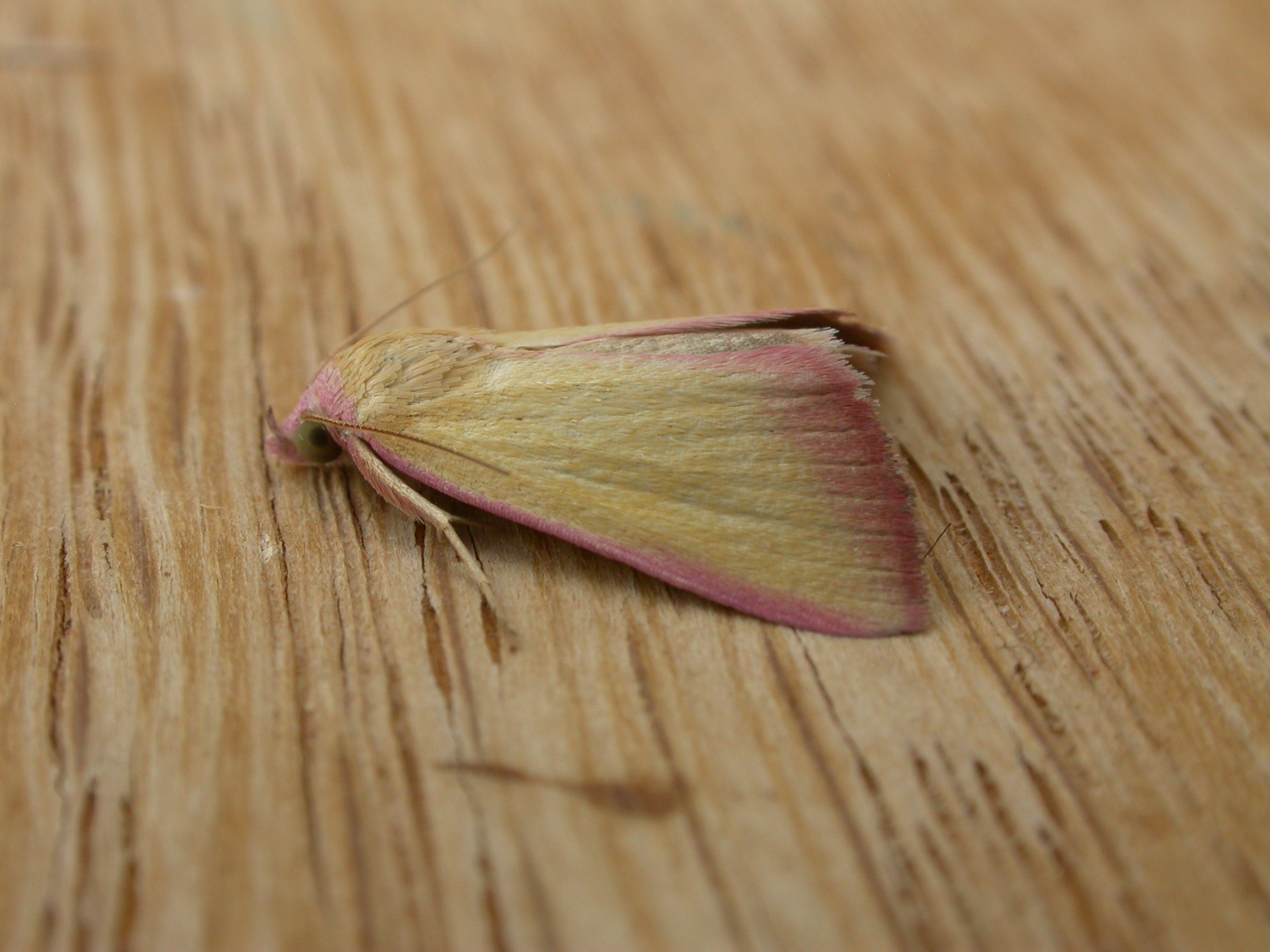

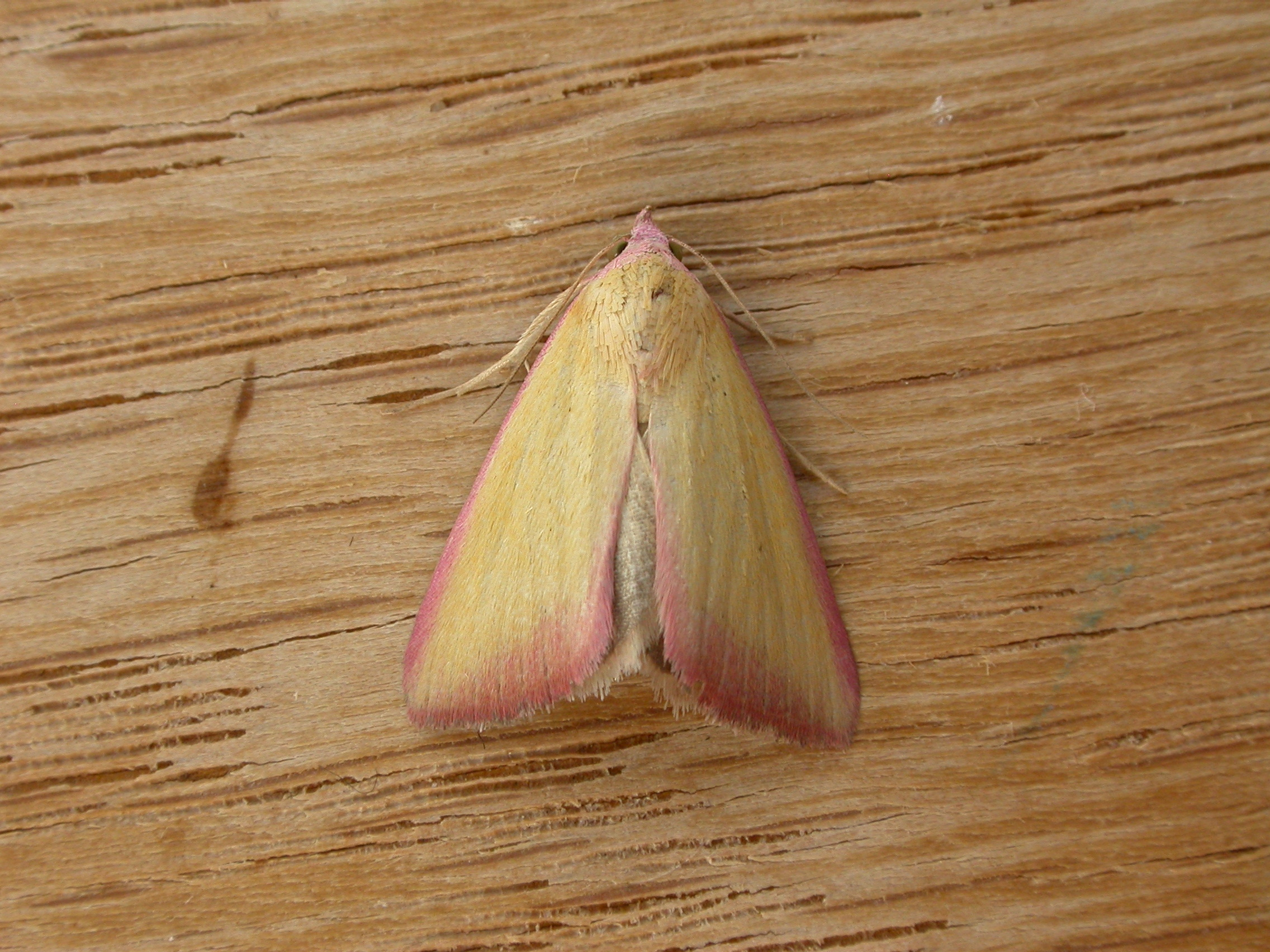

Scientific classification
- Kingdom: Animalia
- Phylum: Arthropoda
- Class: Insecta
- Order: Lepidoptera
- Superfamily: Noctuoidea
- Family: Erebidae
- Genus: Phytometra
- Species: P. formosalis

Binomial name
- Phytometra formosalis (Walker, 1866)

Synonyms
- Anthophila marginalis Walker, 1865; Rhodaria formosalis Walker, 1866; Phytometra marginaloides Poole, 1989

= Phytometra formosalis =

Species of moth

Phytometra formosalis is a species of moth of the family Erebidae. It is known from Australia, including Queensland.
