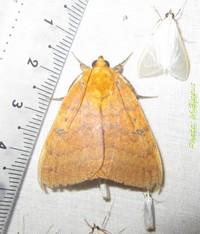

Scientific classification
- Domain: Eukaryota
- Kingdom: Animalia
- Phylum: Arthropoda
- Class: Insecta
- Order: Lepidoptera
- Superfamily: Noctuoidea
- Family: Erebidae
- Tribe: Poaphilini
- Genus: Achaea; Hübner, [1823]

Synonyms
- Geria Walker, 1858; Heliophisma Hampson, 1913

= Achaea (moth) =

Genus of moths

Achaea is a genus of moths in the family Erebidae described by Jacob Hübner in 1923.

== Species ==
- Achaea ablunaris (Guenée, 1852)
- Achaea albicilia (Walker, 1858)
- Achaea albifimbria (Walker, 1869)
- Achaea albilimba (Berio, 1954)
- Achaea apinigra Laporte, 1979
- Achaea argilla Swinhoe, 1901
- Achaea atrimacula Gaede, 1917
- Achaea balteata de Joannis, 1912
- Achaea basalis Berio, 1954
- Achaea basilewskyi Berio, 1954
- Achaea bergeri Berio, 1954
- Achaea boris (Geyer, 1837)
- Achaea busira Strand, 1918
- Achaea canuta Berio, 1978
- Achaea catella Guenée, 1852
- Achaea catocaloides Guenée, 1852
- Achaea chrysopera Druce, 1912
- Achaea cupreitincta Hampson, 1918
- Achaea cyanobathra L. B. Prout, 1919
- Achaea cymatias L. B. Prout, 1919
- Achaea dallolmoi Berio, 1974
- Achaea dasybasis Hampson, 1913
- Achaea dejeanii (Boisduval, 1833)
- Achaea determinata A. E. Prout, 1921
- Achaea diplographa Hampson, 1913
- Achaea dmoe L. B. Prout, 1919
- Achaea durfa Plötz, 1880
- Achaea ebenaui (Saalmüller, 1880)
- Achaea echo (Walker, 1858)
- Achaea euryplaga (Hampson, 1913)
- Achaea eusciasta Hampson, 1913
- Achaea ezea (Cramer, 1780)
- Achaea ezeoides Strand, 1915
- Achaea faber Holland, 1894
- Achaea ferrotincta Hampson, 1918
- Achaea finita (Guenée, 1852)
- Achaea flexuosa A. E. Prout, 1927
- Achaea fontainei Berio, 1956
- Achaea fulminans Rebel, 1915
- Achaea illustrata Walker, 1858
- Achaea imperatrix (Saalmüller, 1881)
- Achaea indeterminata (Walker, 1865)
- Achaea indicabilis Walker, 1858
- Achaea infinita (Guenée, 1852)
- Achaea intercisa Walker, 1865
- Achaea intermedia Wallengren, 1856
- Achaea jamesoni L. B. Prout, 1919
- Achaea janata (Linnaeus, 1758) – castor semi-looper
- Achaea joiceyi A. E. Prout, 1921
- Achaea lanipes (Hulstaert, 1924)
- Achaea lenzi (Saalmüller, 1881)
- Achaea leucopasa (Walker, 1858)
- Achaea leucopera Druce, 1912
- Achaea lienardi (Boisduval 1833)
- Achaea macronephra (Berio, 1956)
- Achaea malagasy Viette, 1981
- Achaea mercatoria (Fabricius, 1775)
- Achaea mezentia (Stoll, 1780)
- Achaea ministra L. B. Prout, 1919
- Achaea monodi Laporte, 1975
- Achaea mormoides Walker, 1858
- Achaea nigristriata Laporte, 1979
- Achaea nubifera Moore, 1877
- Achaea obvia Hampson, 1913
- Achaea occidens (Hampson, 1913)
- Achaea oedipodina Mabille, 1879
- Achaea orbigera Gaede, 1917
- Achaea orthogramma (Mabille, 1879)
- Achaea pentasema L. B. Prout, 1919
- Achaea phaeobasis Hampson, 1913
- Achaea poliopasta Hampson, 1913
- Achaea praestans (Guenée, 1852)
- Achaea purpurascens Holloway, 1982
- Achaea radama Felder and Rogenhofer, 1874
- Achaea regularidia (Strand, 1912)
- Achaea renata A. E. Prout, 1927
- Achaea retrorsa Hampson, 1913
- Achaea robinsoni Holloway, 1982
- Achaea rothkirchi (Strand, 1914)
- Achaea russoi Strand, 1918
- Achaea saboeaereginae Laporte, 1975
- Achaea sakaraha Griveaud, 1981
- Achaea semiflava Carcasson, 1965
- Achaea serva (Fabricius, 1775)
- Achaea seyrigi Griveaud, 1981
- Achaea simplex Walker, 1865
- Achaea sordida (Walker, 1865)
- Achaea stumpffii Saalmüller, 1880
- Achaea theata D. S. Fletcher, 1957
- Achaea thermopera Hampson, 1913
- Achaea tolnaodes Berio, 1956
- Achaea tornistigma A.E., Prout 1921
- Achaea trapezoides (Guenée, 1862)
- Achaea umbrigera Mabille, 1897
- Achaea usitata A. E. Prout, 1927
- Achaea violaceofascia (Saalmüller, 1891)
- Achaea violascens Hampson, 1918
- Achaea xanthodera (Holland, 1894)
