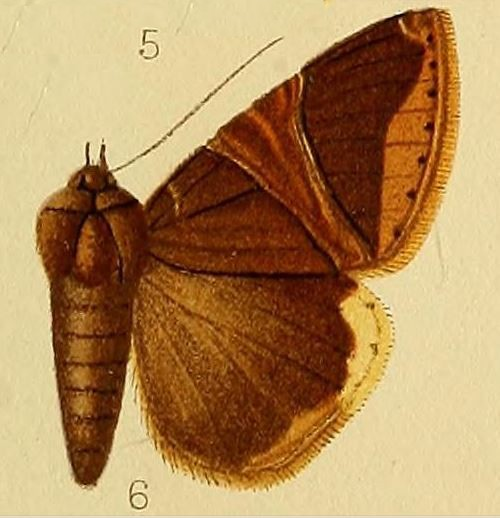

Scientific classification
- Kingdom: Animalia
- Phylum: Arthropoda
- Class: Insecta
- Order: Lepidoptera
- Superfamily: Noctuoidea
- Family: Erebidae
- Genus: Achaea
- Species: A. balteata

Binomial name
- Achaea balteata de Joannis, 1912

= Achaea balteata =

Species of moth

Achaea balteata is a species of moth of the family Erebidae. It is found in northern Madagascar.

This species has a wingspan of 47 mm.
