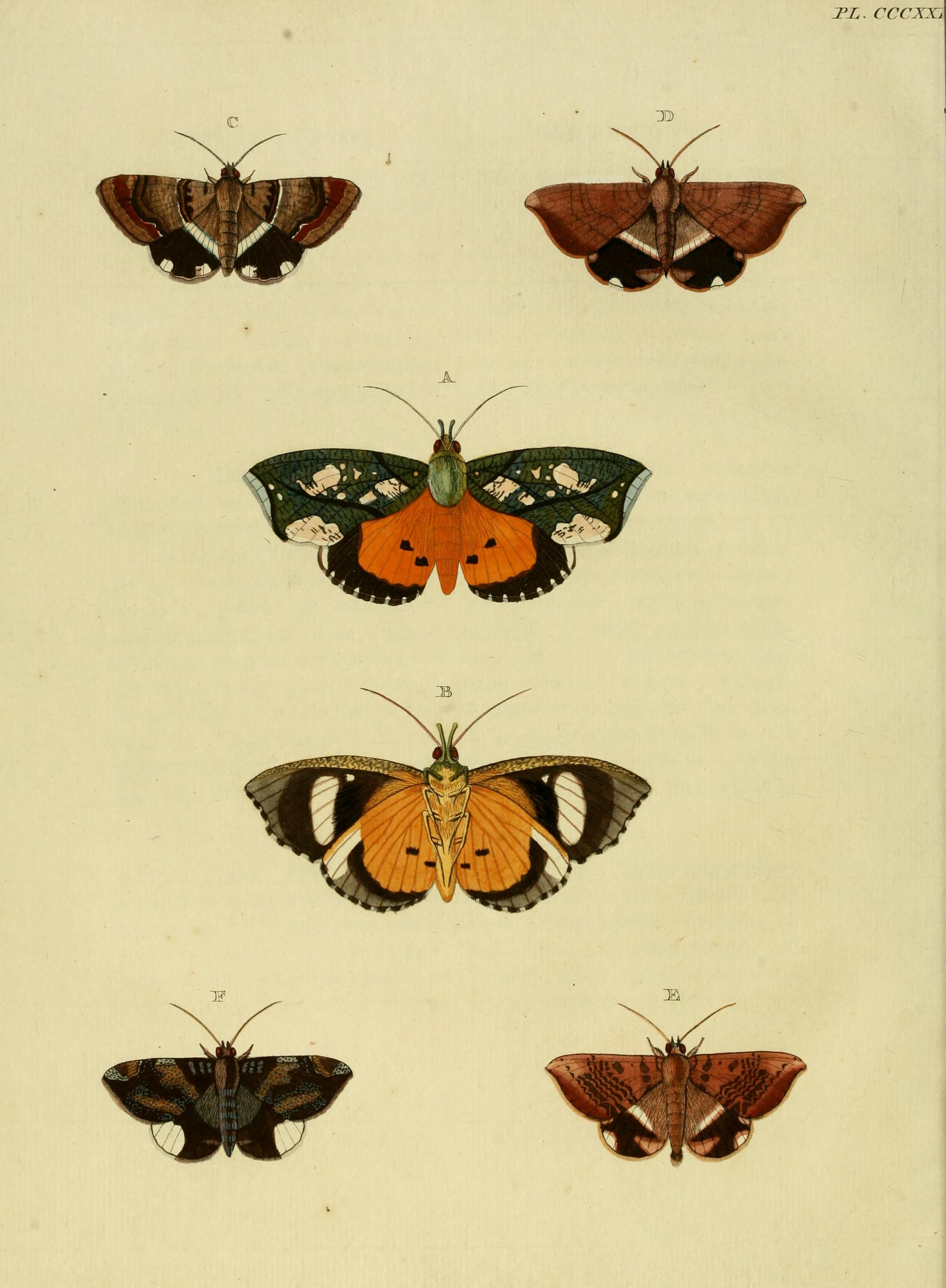
- Lower left side

Scientific classification
- Kingdom: Animalia
- Phylum: Arthropoda
- Class: Insecta
- Order: Lepidoptera
- Superfamily: Noctuoidea
- Family: Erebidae
- Genus: Achaea
- Species: A. mezentia

Binomial name
- Achaea mezentia (Stoll, 1780)

Synonyms
- Acanthodelta mezentia Stoll, 1780; Achaea reversa Walker, 1858; Achaea lugens (Walker, 1865)

= Achaea mezentia =

Species of moth

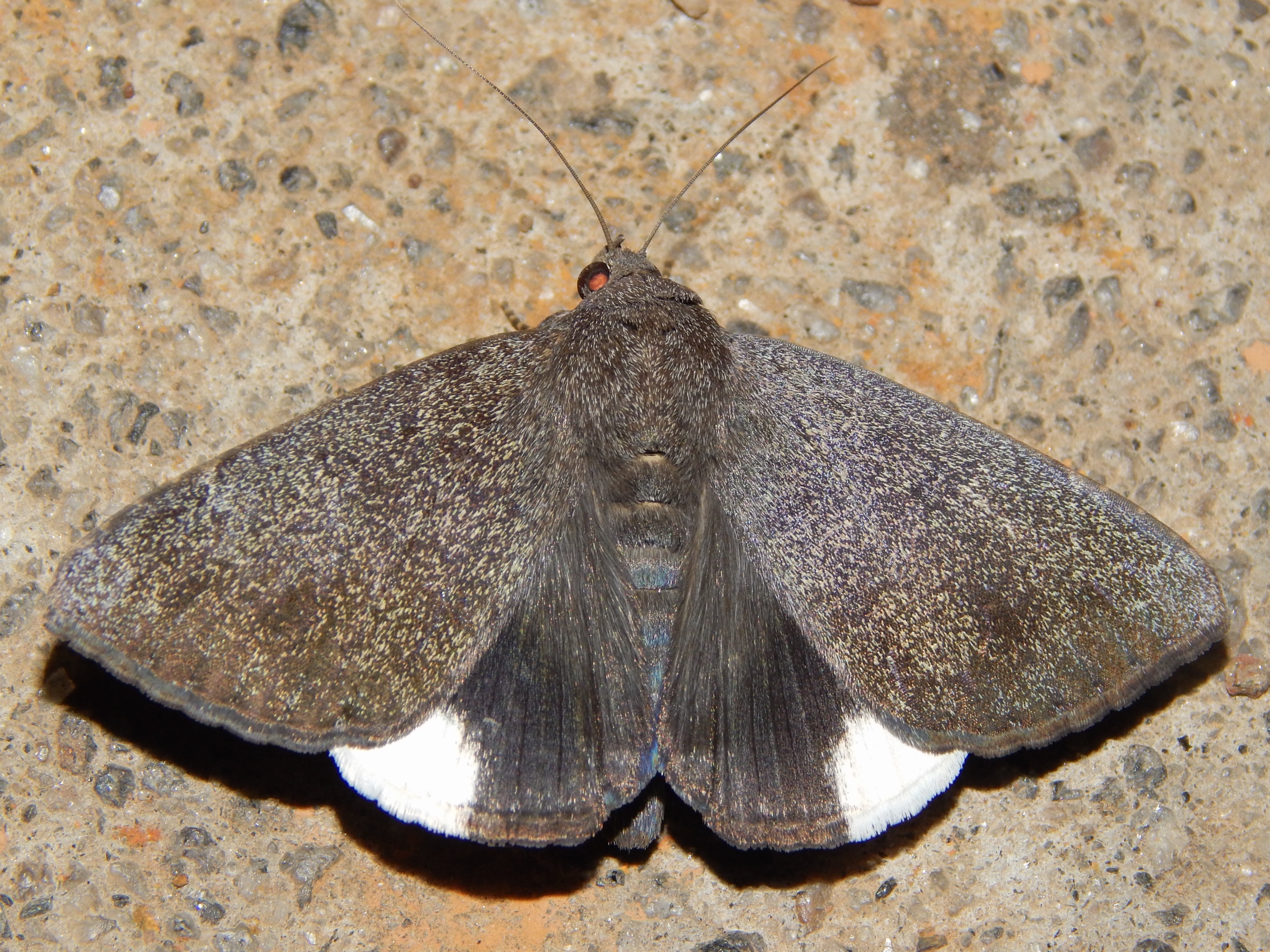
Achaea mezentia

Achaea mezentia is a moth of the family Erebidae first described by Caspar Stoll in 1780. It is found in India and Sri Lanka.

The caterpillar is known to feed on Canthium, Guioa canescens, Ixora, Sapindus laurifolia, and Elaeodendron glaucum species.
