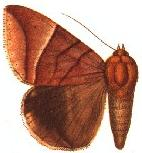

Scientific classification
- Kingdom: Animalia
- Phylum: Arthropoda
- Class: Insecta
- Order: Lepidoptera
- Superfamily: Noctuoidea
- Family: Erebidae
- Genus: Achaea
- Species: A. occidens

Binomial name
- Achaea occidens (Hampson, 1913)

Synonyms
- Lagoptera occidens Hampson, 1913; Artena occidens

= Achaea occidens =

Species of moth

Achaea occidens is a species of moth of the family Erebidae first described by George Hampson in 1913. It is found in Ghana, the Democratic Republic of the Congo, Ivory Coast, the Gambia and Sierra Leone.
