= Phytometra zotica =

Scientific classification
- Kingdom: Animalia
- Phylum: Arthropoda
- Class: Insecta
- Order: Lepidoptera
- Superfamily: Noctuoidea
- Family: Erebidae
- Genus: Phytometra
- Species: P. zotica

Binomial name
- Phytometra zotica (Viette, 1956)

Synonyms
- Antarchaea zotica Viette, 1956

Species of moth

Phytometra zotica is a species of moth of the family Erebidae. It is found in Madagascar.
