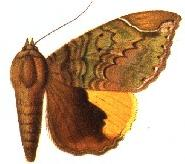

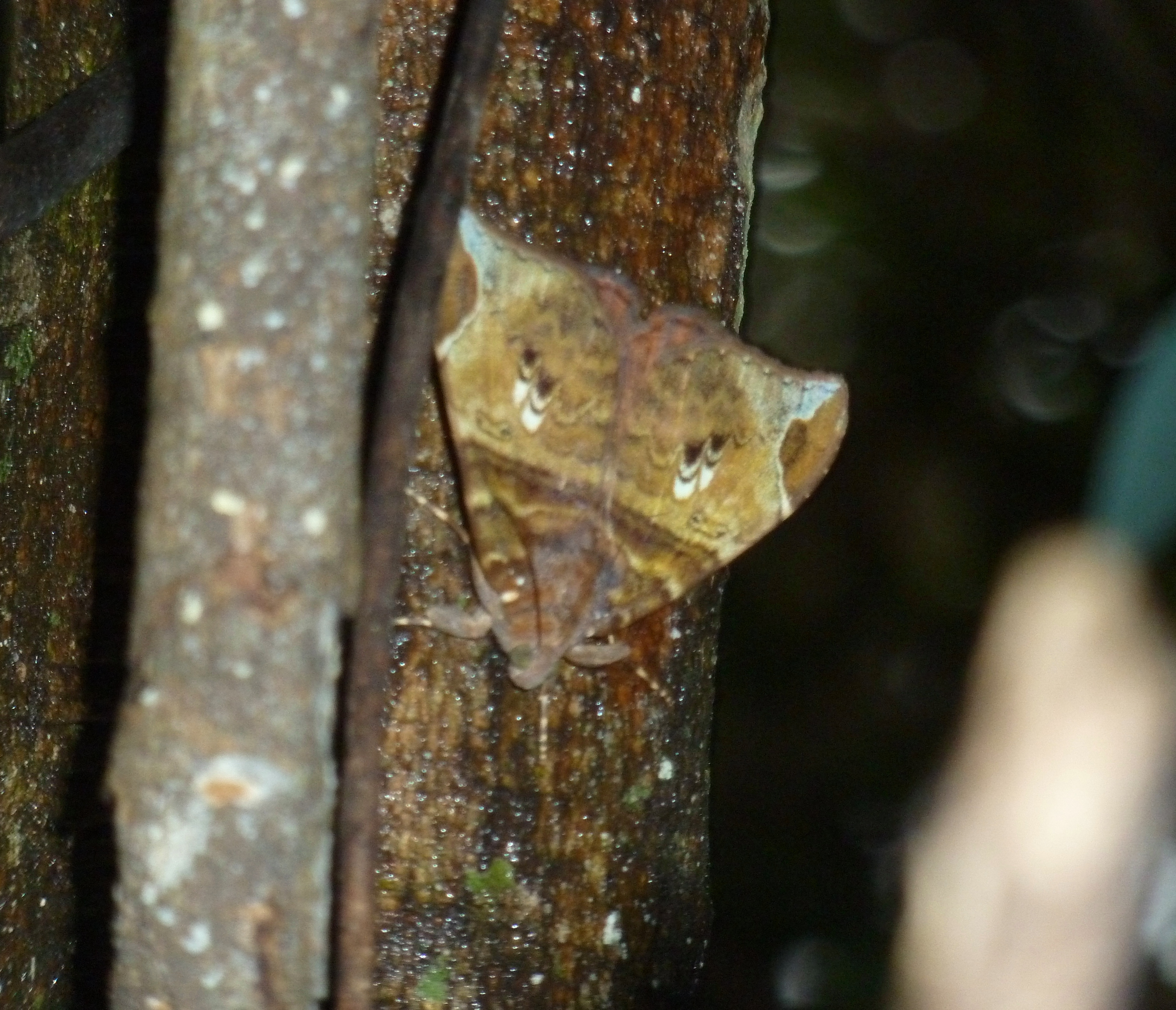

Scientific classification
- Kingdom: Animalia
- Phylum: Arthropoda
- Class: Insecta
- Order: Lepidoptera
- Superfamily: Noctuoidea
- Family: Erebidae
- Genus: Achaea
- Species: A. praestans

Binomial name
- Achaea praestans (Guenée, 1852)

Synonyms
- Ophisma praestans Guenée, 1852; Achaea apinigra Laporte, 1979; Achaea bryoxantha (Hampson, 1902); Achaea arabella Bryk, 1915; Ophiusa bryoxantha Hampson, 1902; Acanthodelta praestans (Guenée 1852)

= Achaea praestans =

Orange-bordered achaea

Species of moth

Achaea praestans, the orange-bordered achaea, is a moth of the family Erebidae. The species was first described by Achille Guenée in 1852. It is found in South Africa, Ethiopia, Eswatini, Kenya, Madagascar, Malawi, Mozambique, Tanzania and Zimbabwe.

It has a wingspan of 54 mm.
