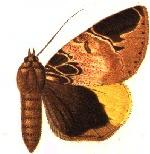

Scientific classification
- Kingdom: Animalia
- Phylum: Arthropoda
- Class: Insecta
- Order: Lepidoptera
- Superfamily: Noctuoidea
- Family: Erebidae
- Genus: Achaea
- Species: A. intercisa

Binomial name
- Achaea intercisa Walker, 1865

Synonyms
- Acanthodelta intercisa (Walker, 1865)

= Achaea intercisa =

Species of moth

Achaea intercisa is a species of moth of the family Erebidae first described by Francis Walker in 1865. It is found in Sierra Leone.
