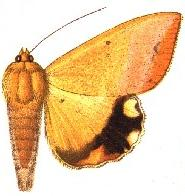

Scientific classification
- Kingdom: Animalia
- Phylum: Arthropoda
- Class: Insecta
- Order: Lepidoptera
- Superfamily: Noctuoidea
- Family: Erebidae
- Genus: Achaea
- Species: A. leucopasa

Binomial name
- Achaea leucopasa (Walker, 1858)

Synonyms
- Achaea karschi (Pagenstecher, 1907); Ophisma leucopasa Walker, 1858; Ophiusa karschi Pagenstecher, 1907; Acanthodelta leucopasa (Walker, 1858)

= Achaea leucopasa =

Species of moth

Achaea leucopasa is a species of moth of the family Erebidae first described by Francis Walker in 1858. It is found on Madagascar and Réunion.
