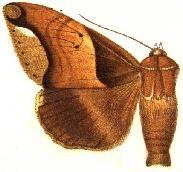

Scientific classification
- Kingdom: Animalia
- Phylum: Arthropoda
- Class: Insecta
- Order: Lepidoptera
- Superfamily: Noctuoidea
- Family: Erebidae
- Genus: Achaea
- Species: A. retrorsa

Binomial name
- Achaea retrorsa Hampson, 1913

Synonyms
- Acanthodelta retrorsa (Hampson, 1913)

= Achaea retrorsa =

Species of moth

Achaea retrorsa is a species of moth of the family Erebidae first described by George Hampson in 1913. It is found on Madagascar.
