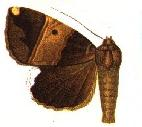

Scientific classification
- Kingdom: Animalia
- Phylum: Arthropoda
- Class: Insecta
- Order: Lepidoptera
- Superfamily: Noctuoidea
- Family: Erebidae
- Genus: Achaea
- Species: A. obvia

Binomial name
- Achaea obvia Hampson, 1913

Synonyms
- Achaea angustifascia D. S. Fletcher, 1963; Acanthodelta obvia (Hampson 1913); Achaea obvia angustifascia

= Achaea obvia =

Species of moth

Achaea obvia is a species of moth of the family Erebidae. It was described by George Hampson in 1913 and is found in Africa, including Malawi, Nigeria and South Africa.
