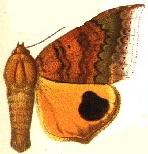

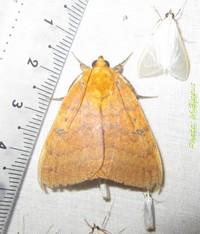

Scientific classification
- Kingdom: Animalia
- Phylum: Arthropoda
- Class: Insecta
- Order: Lepidoptera
- Superfamily: Noctuoidea
- Family: Erebidae
- Genus: Achaea
- Species: A. euryplaga

Binomial name
- Achaea euryplaga (Hampson, 1913)

Synonyms
- Heliophisma euryplaga Hampson, 1913; Acanthodelta euryplaga (Hampson, 1913)

= Achaea euryplaga =

Species of moth

Achaea euryplaga is a species of moth of the family Erebidae first described by George Hampson in 1913. It is found on Réunion and Madagascar.
