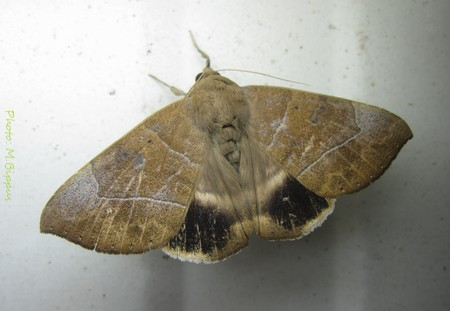

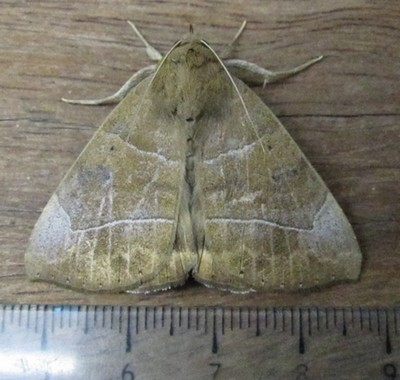

Scientific classification
- Kingdom: Animalia
- Phylum: Arthropoda
- Class: Insecta
- Order: Lepidoptera
- Superfamily: Noctuoidea
- Family: Erebidae
- Genus: Achaea
- Species: A. trapezoides

Binomial name
- Achaea trapezoides (Guenée, 1862)

Synonyms
- Ophisma trapezoides Guenée, 1862; Acanthodelta trapezoides (Guenée, 1862)

= Achaea trapezoides =

Species of moth

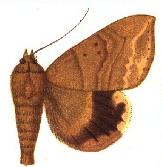

Achaea trapezoides is a species of moth of the family Erebidae. It is found in South Africa and on Réunion.

Achille Guenée described this species with a wingspan of 52 mm.

Their caterpillars feed on Euphorbiaceae, Acalpha species and Ricinus communis. They have also been observed on roses
