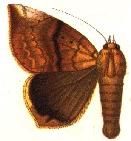

Scientific classification
- Kingdom: Animalia
- Phylum: Arthropoda
- Class: Insecta
- Order: Lepidoptera
- Superfamily: Noctuoidea
- Family: Erebidae
- Genus: Achaea
- Species: A. xanthodera

Binomial name
- Achaea xanthodera (Holland, 1894)

Synonyms
- Naxia xanthodera Holland, 1894; Acanthodelta xanthodera (Holland, 1894)

= Achaea xanthodera =

Species of moth

Achaea xanthodera is a species of moth of the family Erebidae first described by William Jacob Holland in 1894. It is found in the Democratic Republic of the Congo, Gabon and Nigeria.
