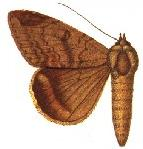

Scientific classification
- Kingdom: Animalia
- Phylum: Arthropoda
- Class: Insecta
- Order: Lepidoptera
- Superfamily: Noctuoidea
- Family: Erebidae
- Genus: Achaea
- Species: A. thermopera

Binomial name
- Achaea thermopera Hampson, 1913

Synonyms
- Acanthodelta thermopera (Hampson, 1913); Achaea thermopera basobscura

= Achaea thermopera =

Species of moth

Achaea thermopera is a species of moth of the family Erebidae first described by George Hampson in 1913. It is found in Burundi, the Democratic Republic of the Congo, Kenya, Rwanda, Sudan, Tanzania, Uganda and Nigeria.

The larvae have been recorded on Leptospermum variegatum.
