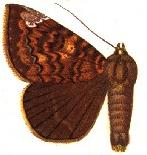

Scientific classification
- Kingdom: Animalia
- Phylum: Arthropoda
- Class: Insecta
- Order: Lepidoptera
- Superfamily: Noctuoidea
- Family: Erebidae
- Genus: Achaea
- Species: A. albifimbria

Binomial name
- Achaea albifimbria (Walker, 1869)

Synonyms
- Ophiusa albifimbria Walker, 1869; Achaea apiciplaga (Holland, 1894); Naxia apiciplaga Holland, 1894; Acanthodelta albifimbria Walker, 1869

= Achaea albifimbria =

Species of moth

Achaea albifimbria is a species of moth of the family Erebidae first described by Francis Walker in 1869. It is found in Cameroon, the Democratic Republic of the Congo, Gabon, Nigeria, Sierra Leone and Uganda.
