= Acanthodelta (acanthocephalan) =

Scientific classification
- Kingdom: Animalia
- Phylum: Acanthocephala
- Class: Eoacanthocephala
- Order: Gyracanthocephala
- Family: Quadrigyridae
- Genus: Acanthodelta; Diaz-Ungria and Gracia-Rodrigo, 1958

Genus of worms

Acanthodelta is a genus of acanthocephalan.

== Taxonomy ==
The National Center for Biotechnology Information does not indicate that any phylogenetic analysis has been published on Acanthodelta that would confirm its position as a unique order in the family Quadrigyridae.

== Description ==
Acanthodelta consists of a proboscis covered in hooks and a trunk.

== Distribution ==
The distribution of Acanthodelta is determined by that of its hosts.

== Hosts ==
Life cycle of Acanthocephala. (Note: There are no known aberrant human infections for Acanthodelta species.)

The life cycle of an acanthocephalan consists of three stages beginning when an infective acanthor (development of an egg) is released from the intestines of the definitive host and then ingested by an arthropod, the intermediate host. Although the intermediate hosts of Acanthodelta are not known. When the acanthor molts, the second stage called the acanthella begins. This stage involves penetrating the wall of the mesenteron or the intestine of the intermediate host and growing. The final stage is the infective cystacanth which is the larval or juvenile state of an Acanthocephalan, differing from the adult only in size and stage of sexual development. The cystacanths within the intermediate hosts are consumed by the definitive host, usually attaching to the walls of the intestines, and as adults they reproduce sexually in the intestines. The acanthor are passed in the feces of the definitive host and the cycle repeats. There are no known paratenic hosts (hosts where parasites infest but do not undergo larval development or sexual reproduction) for Acanthodelta.

There are no reported cases of any Acanthodelta species infesting humans in the English language medical literature.
