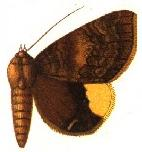

Scientific classification
- Kingdom: Animalia
- Phylum: Arthropoda
- Class: Insecta
- Order: Lepidoptera
- Superfamily: Noctuoidea
- Family: Erebidae
- Genus: Achaea
- Species: A. dejeanii

Binomial name
- Achaea dejeanii (Boisduval, 1833)

Synonyms
- Achaea orea Mabille, 1881; Achaea madagascariensis (Guenée, 1852); Achoea madagascariensis Guenée, 1852; Ophiusa dejeanii Boisduval, 1833; Acanthodelta dejeanii (Boisduval, 1833)

= Achaea dejeanii =

Species of moth

Achaea dejeanii is a species of moth of the family Erebidae first described by Jean Baptiste Boisduval in 1833. It is found in Madagascar.
