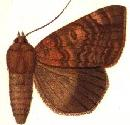

Scientific classification
- Kingdom: Animalia
- Phylum: Arthropoda
- Class: Insecta
- Order: Lepidoptera
- Superfamily: Noctuoidea
- Family: Erebidae
- Genus: Achaea
- Species: A. diplographa

Binomial name
- Achaea diplographa Hampson, 1913

Synonyms
- Acanthodelta diplographa ( Hampson, 1913)

= Achaea diplographa =

Species of moth

Achaea diplographa is a species of moth of the family Erebidae first described by George Hampson in 1913. It is found in the Comoros off the eastern coast of Africa.
