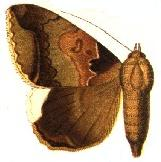

Scientific classification
- Kingdom: Animalia
- Phylum: Arthropoda
- Class: Insecta
- Order: Lepidoptera
- Superfamily: Noctuoidea
- Family: Erebidae
- Genus: Achaea
- Species: A. indicabilis

Binomial name
- Achaea indicabilis Walker, 1858

Synonyms
- Acanthodelta indicabilis (Walker, 1858)

= Achaea indicabilis =

Species of moth

Achaea indicabilis is a species of moth of the family Erebidae first described by Francis Walker in 1858. It is found in Africa, including São Tomé, Ghana and the Gold Coast.

The larvae feed on Citrus species.
