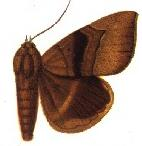

Scientific classification
- Kingdom: Animalia
- Phylum: Arthropoda
- Class: Insecta
- Order: Lepidoptera
- Superfamily: Noctuoidea
- Family: Erebidae
- Genus: Achaea
- Species: A. umbrigera

Binomial name
- Achaea umbrigera Mabille, 1897

Synonyms
- Acanthodelta umbrigera Mabille, 1897

= Achaea umbrigera =

Species of moth

Achaea umbrigera is a species of moth of the family Erebidae first described by Paul Mabille in 1897. It is found on Mauritius.
