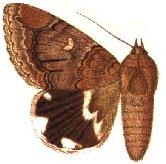

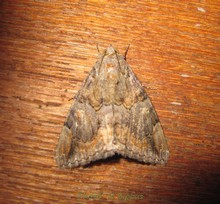

Scientific classification
- Kingdom: Animalia
- Phylum: Arthropoda
- Clade: Pancrustacea
- Class: Insecta
- Order: Lepidoptera
- Superfamily: Noctuoidea
- Family: Erebidae
- Genus: Achaea
- Species: A. oedipodina

Binomial name
- Achaea oedipodina Mabille, 1879

Synonyms
- Acanthodelta oedipodina (Mabille, 1879)

= Achaea oedipodina =

Species of moth

Achaea oedipodina is a species of moth of the family Erebidae first described by Paul Mabille in 1879. It is found in Africa, including Madagascar, Réunion and the Seychelles.

Its wingspan is around 65 mm. Its larvae feed on Euphorbiaceae species, including Euphoria milii and Acalypha wilkesinia.
