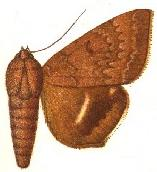

Scientific classification
- Kingdom: Animalia
- Phylum: Arthropoda
- Class: Insecta
- Order: Lepidoptera
- Superfamily: Noctuoidea
- Family: Erebidae
- Genus: Achaea
- Species: A. albicilia

Binomial name
- Achaea albicilia (Walker, 1858)

Synonyms
- Ophisma albicilia Walker, 1858; Acanthodelta albicilia (Walker, 1858)

= Achaea albicilia =

Species of moth

Achaea albicilia is a species of moth of the family Erebidae first described by Francis Walker in 1858. It is found in the Democratic Republic of the Congo, the Gambia, Ivory Coast, Malawi, Nigeria, Sierra Leone, South Africa, Tanzania and Uganda.

The larvae have been recorded on mango.
