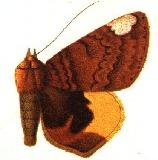

Scientific classification
- Kingdom: Animalia
- Phylum: Arthropoda
- Clade: Pancrustacea
- Class: Insecta
- Order: Lepidoptera
- Superfamily: Noctuoidea
- Family: Erebidae
- Genus: Achaea
- Species: A. chrysopera

Binomial name
- Achaea chrysopera H. Druce, 1912

Synonyms
- Acanthodelta chrysopera (H. Druce, 1912)

= Achaea chrysopera =

Species of moth

Achaea chrysopera is a species of moth of the family Erebidae first described by Herbert Druce in 1912. It is found in Tanzania.
