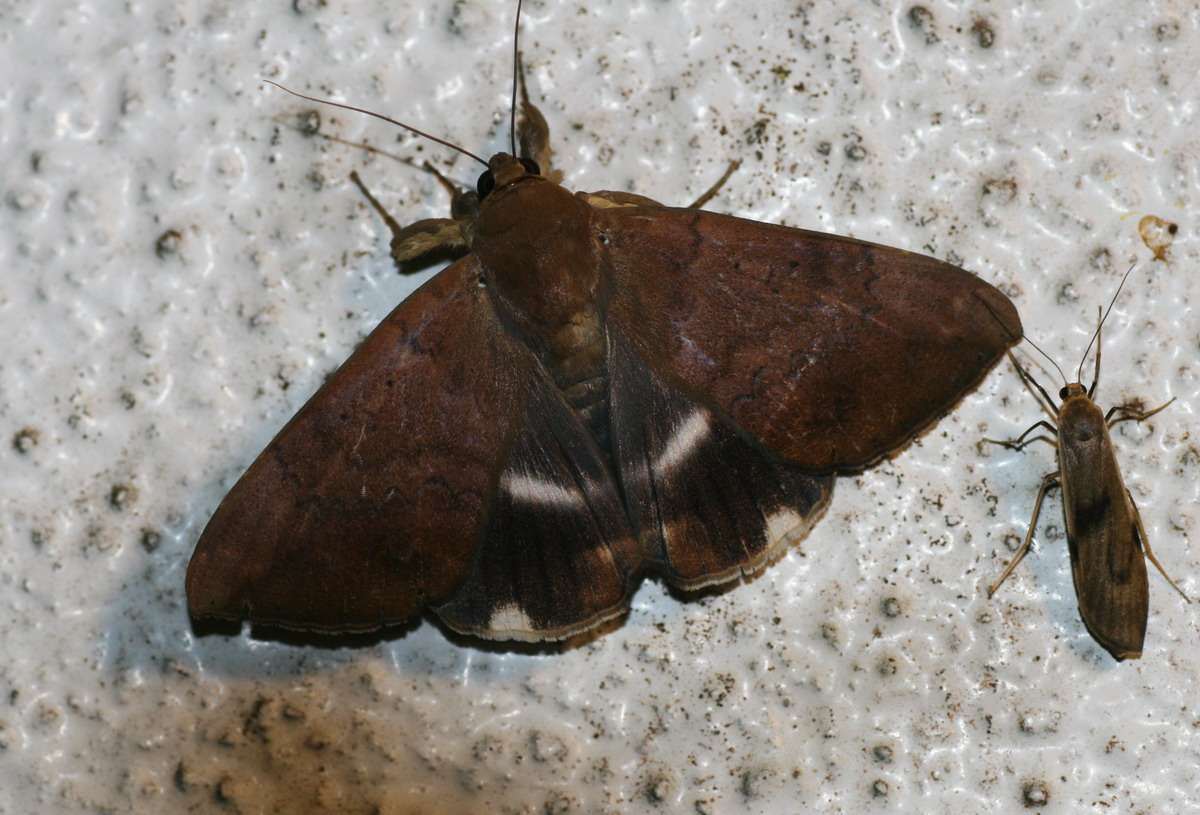

Scientific classification
- Kingdom: Animalia
- Phylum: Arthropoda
- Class: Insecta
- Order: Lepidoptera
- Superfamily: Noctuoidea
- Family: Erebidae
- Genus: Achaea
- Species: A. serva

Binomial name
- Achaea serva (Fabricius, 1775)

Synonyms
- Noctua serva Fabricius, 1775; Achaea fasciculipes Walker, 1858

= Achaea serva =

Species of moth

Achaea serva is a species of noctuid moth of the family Erebidae first described by Johan Christian Fabricius in 1775. It is found from the Indo-Australian tropics of India, Sri Lanka, Myanmar, China, Borneo, Hong Kong, Java, the Philippines, the New Hebrides, to Okinawa, many western Micronesian islands and New Guinea and Australia.

== Description ==
This species has a wingspan of 70–82 mm for the males and 62–80 mm for the females.

== Ecology ==
Recorded larval food plants include Buchanania, Ipomoea, Diospyros, Rosa, Sapindus, Madhuca, Manilkara, Mimusops, Palaquium, Sideroxylon, Excoecaria agallocha, Ricinus communis and Acacia auriculiformis.

== Subspecies ==
- Achaea serva serva
- Achaea serva fuscosuffusa (New Guinea)

== Gallery ==
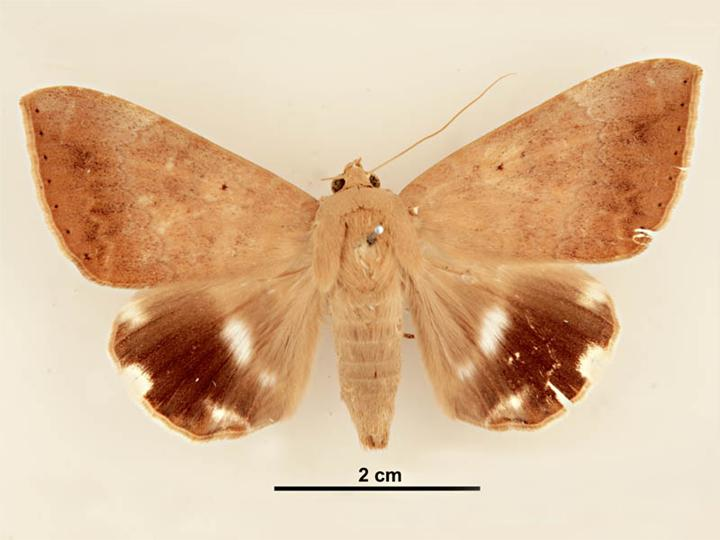
Female, dorsal view

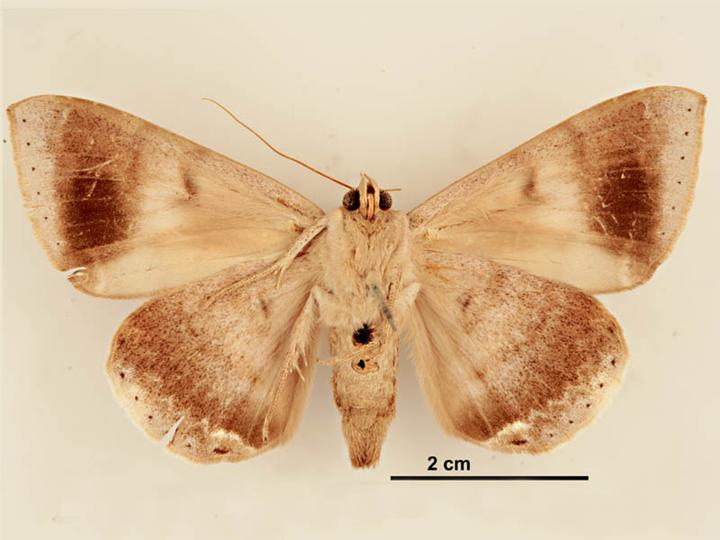
Female, ventral view

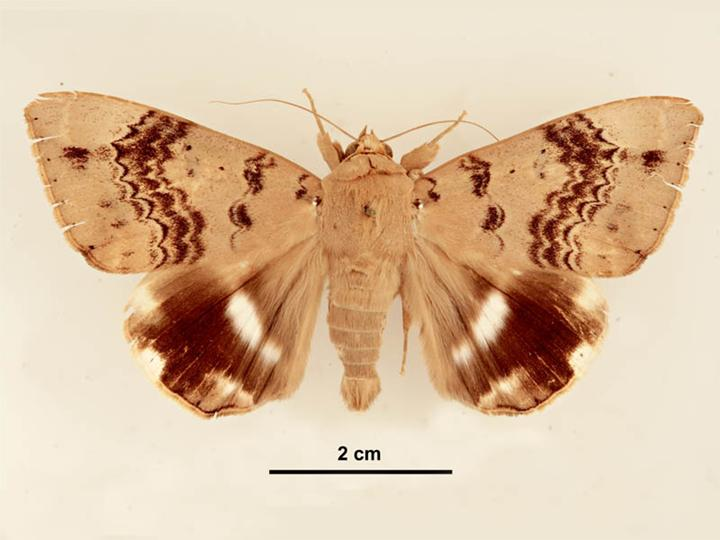
Male, dorsal view

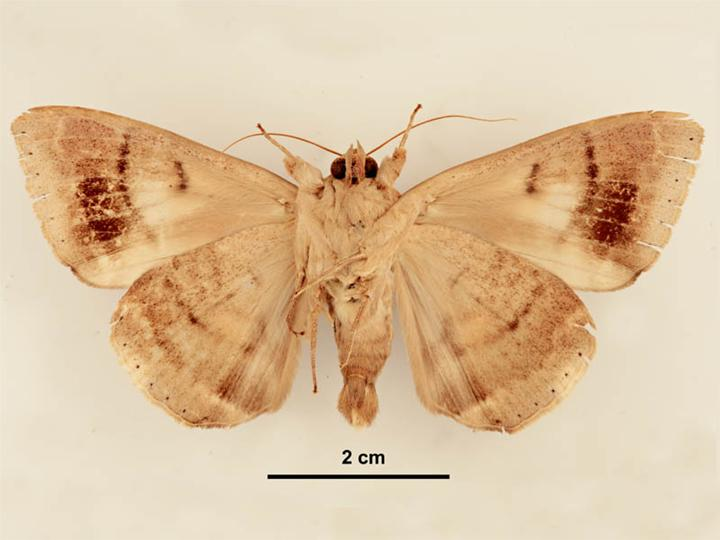
Male, ventral view
