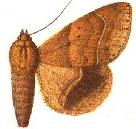

Scientific classification
- Kingdom: Animalia
- Phylum: Arthropoda
- Class: Insecta
- Order: Lepidoptera
- Superfamily: Noctuoidea
- Family: Erebidae
- Genus: Achaea
- Species: A. indeterminata

Binomial name
- Achaea indeterminata (Walker, 1865)

Synonyms
- Achaea demta (Möschler, 1883); Ophisma indeterminata Walker, 1865; Ophisma demta Möschler, 1883; Acanthodelta achaea (Walker, 1865)

= Achaea indeterminata =

Species of moth

Achaea indeterminata is a species of moth of the family Erebidae first described by Francis Walker in 1865. It is found in South Africa and Eswatini.
