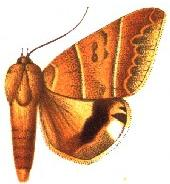

Scientific classification
- Kingdom: Animalia
- Phylum: Arthropoda
- Class: Insecta
- Order: Lepidoptera
- Superfamily: Noctuoidea
- Family: Erebidae
- Genus: Achaea
- Species: A. orthogramma

Binomial name
- Achaea orthogramma (Mabille, 1879)

Synonyms
- Achaea sarcopasa Druce, 1912; Ophiodes orthogramma Mabille, 1879; Acanthodelta orthogramma (Mabille, 1879)

= Achaea orthogramma =

Species of moth

Achaea orthogramma is a species of moth of the family Erebidae. It is found in Africa, including Madagascar.

Its larvae feed on Syzygium cumini, a Myrtaceae.
