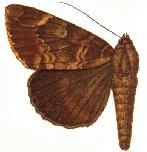

Scientific classification
- Kingdom: Animalia
- Phylum: Arthropoda
- Clade: Pancrustacea
- Class: Insecta
- Order: Lepidoptera
- Superfamily: Noctuoidea
- Family: Erebidae
- Genus: Achaea
- Species: A. phaeobasis

Binomial name
- Achaea phaeobasis Hampson, 1913

Synonyms
- Acanthodelta phaeobasis (Hampson, 1913)

= Achaea phaeobasis =

Species of moth

Achaea phaeobasis is a species of moth of the family Erebidae first described by George Hampson in 1913. It is found in the Democratic Republic of the Congo, South Sudan, Tanzania and Uganda.
