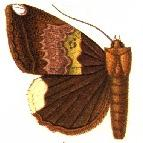

Scientific classification
- Kingdom: Animalia
- Phylum: Arthropoda
- Class: Insecta
- Order: Lepidoptera
- Superfamily: Noctuoidea
- Family: Erebidae
- Genus: Achaea
- Species: A. leucopera

Binomial name
- Achaea leucopera H. Druce, 1912

Synonyms
- Acanthodelta leucopera (H. Druce, 1912)

= Achaea leucopera =

Species of moth

Achaea leucopera is a species of moth of the family Erebidae first described by Herbert Druce in 1912. It is found in Cameroon, Gabon and the Democratic Republic of the Congo.
