= Max Saalmüller =

German entomologist (1832–1890)

Max Saalmüller (26 November 1832 in Römhild, Germany – 12 October 1890 in Bockenheim) was a Prussian lieutenant colonel and German entomologist.

== List of works ==
- Illustrations for Der Heerwurm of Ludwig Bechstein, 1851
- Mittheilungen über Madagaskar, seine Lepidopteren-Fauna, 1878 (in (in English) News about Madagascar, its Lepidoptera fauna, 1878)
- Lepidopteren von Madagascar, 2 Bände, 1884/91 (in (in English) Lepidoptera of Madagascar), 2 editions, 1884/1891
- Neue Lepidopteren aus Madagaskar, die sich im Museum der Seckenberg, in Bericht über die Senckenbergischen Naturforschende Gesellschaft, 1879–1890, pp. 258–310
