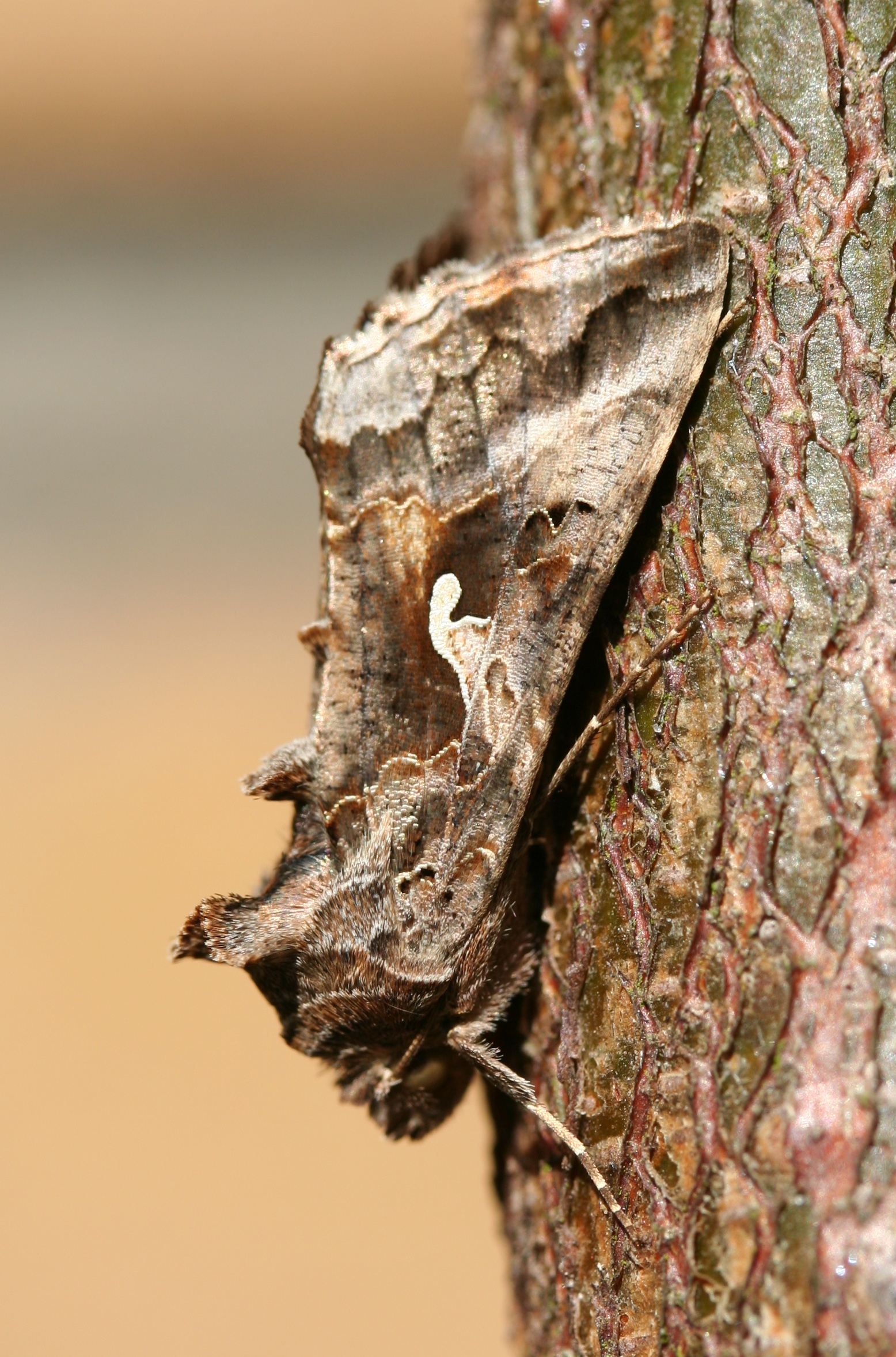
- Autographa gamma

Scientific classification
- Kingdom: Animalia
- Phylum: Arthropoda
- Clade: Pancrustacea
- Class: Insecta
- Order: Lepidoptera
- Superfamily: Noctuoidea
- Family: Noctuidae
- Subfamily: Plusiinae

Tribes
- Abrostolini; Argyrogrammatini; Omorphini; Plusiini

= Plusiinae =

Subfamily of moths

Plusiinae is a smallish (by noctuid standards) subfamily of the moth family Noctuidae. As the Noctuidae appear to be a paraphyletic assemblage, the Plusiinae may eventually be raised to family status (Weller et al. 1994).

Comparison of Eurasian species

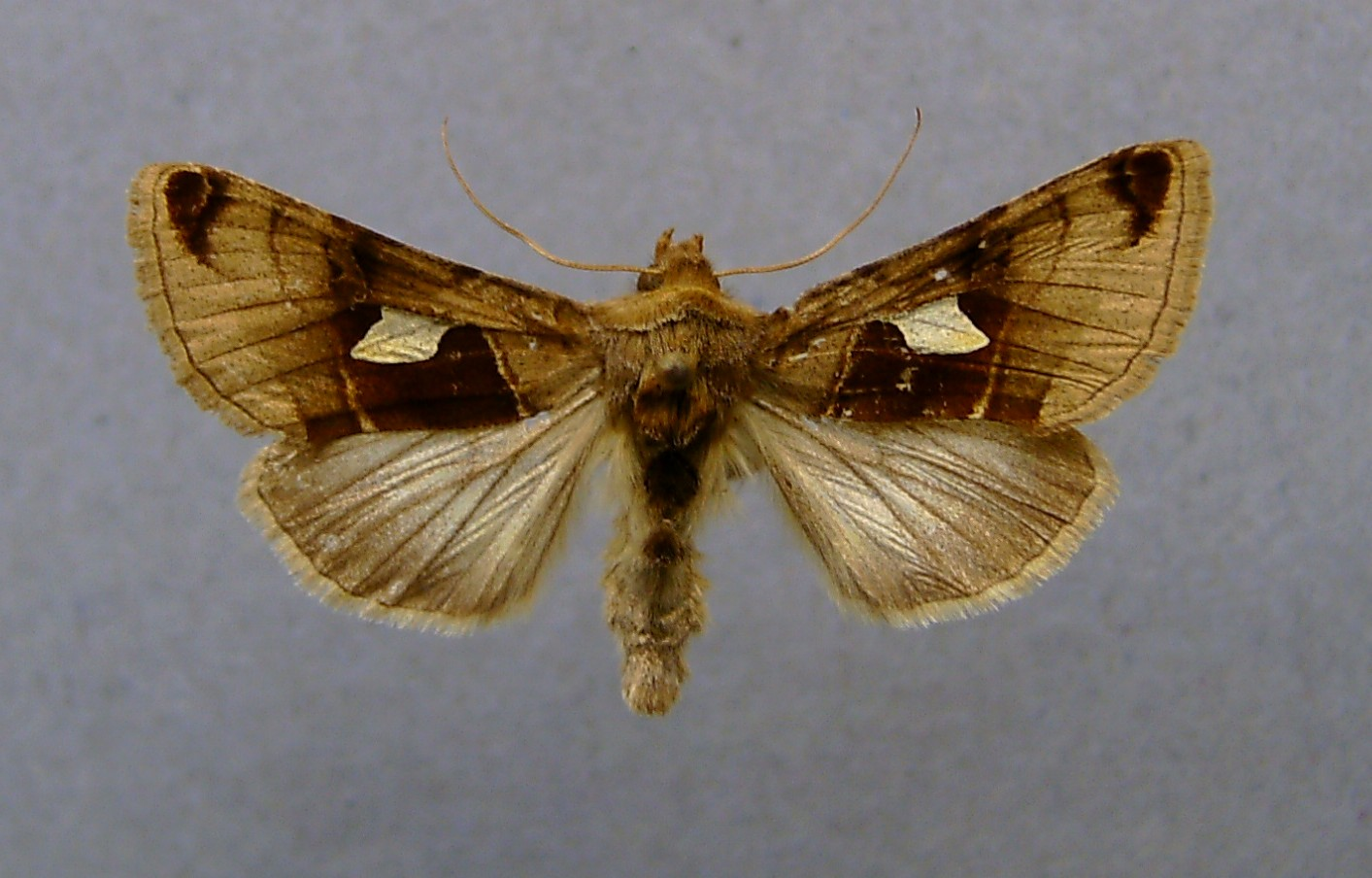
Autographa aemula

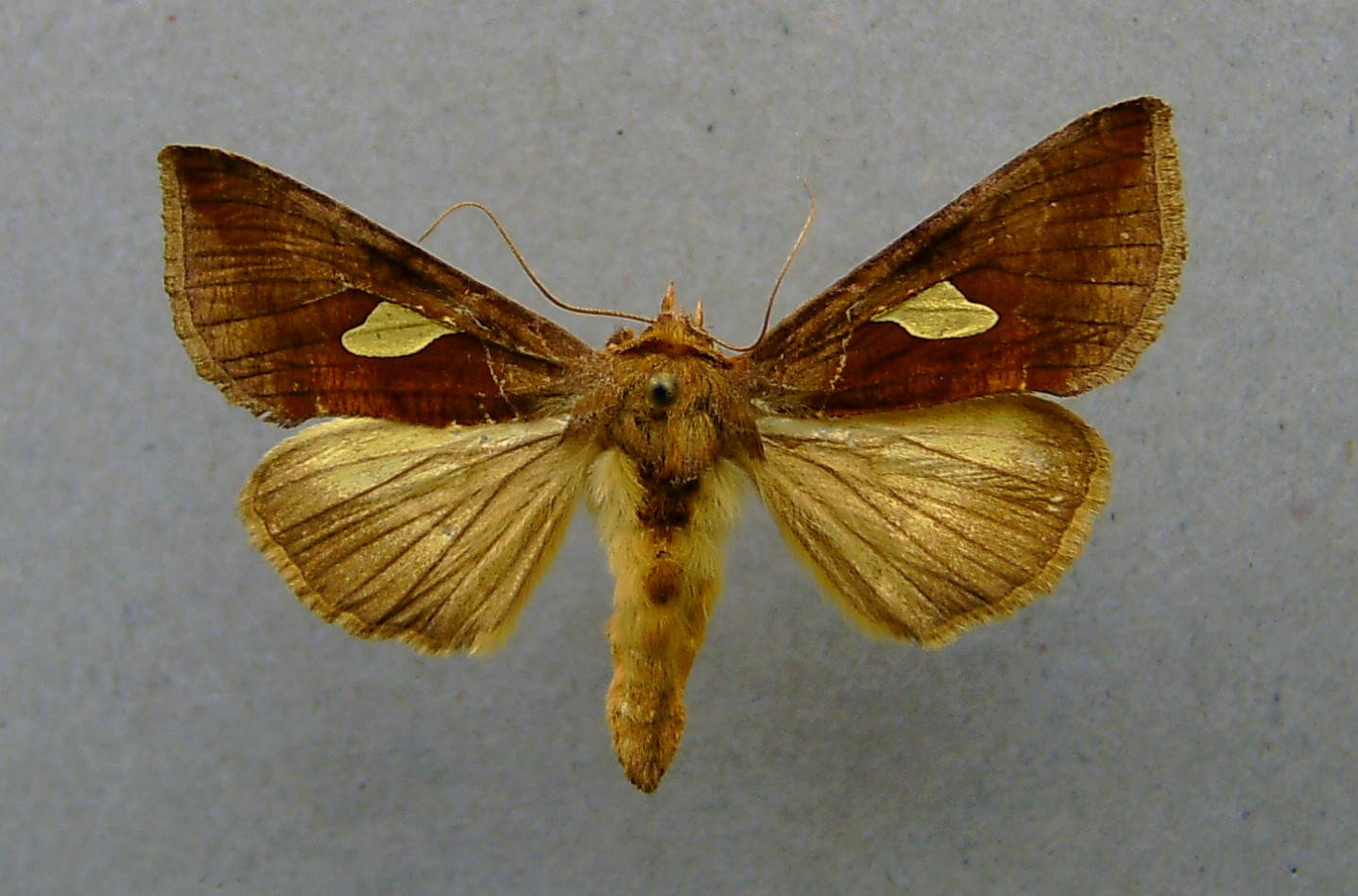
Autographa bractea

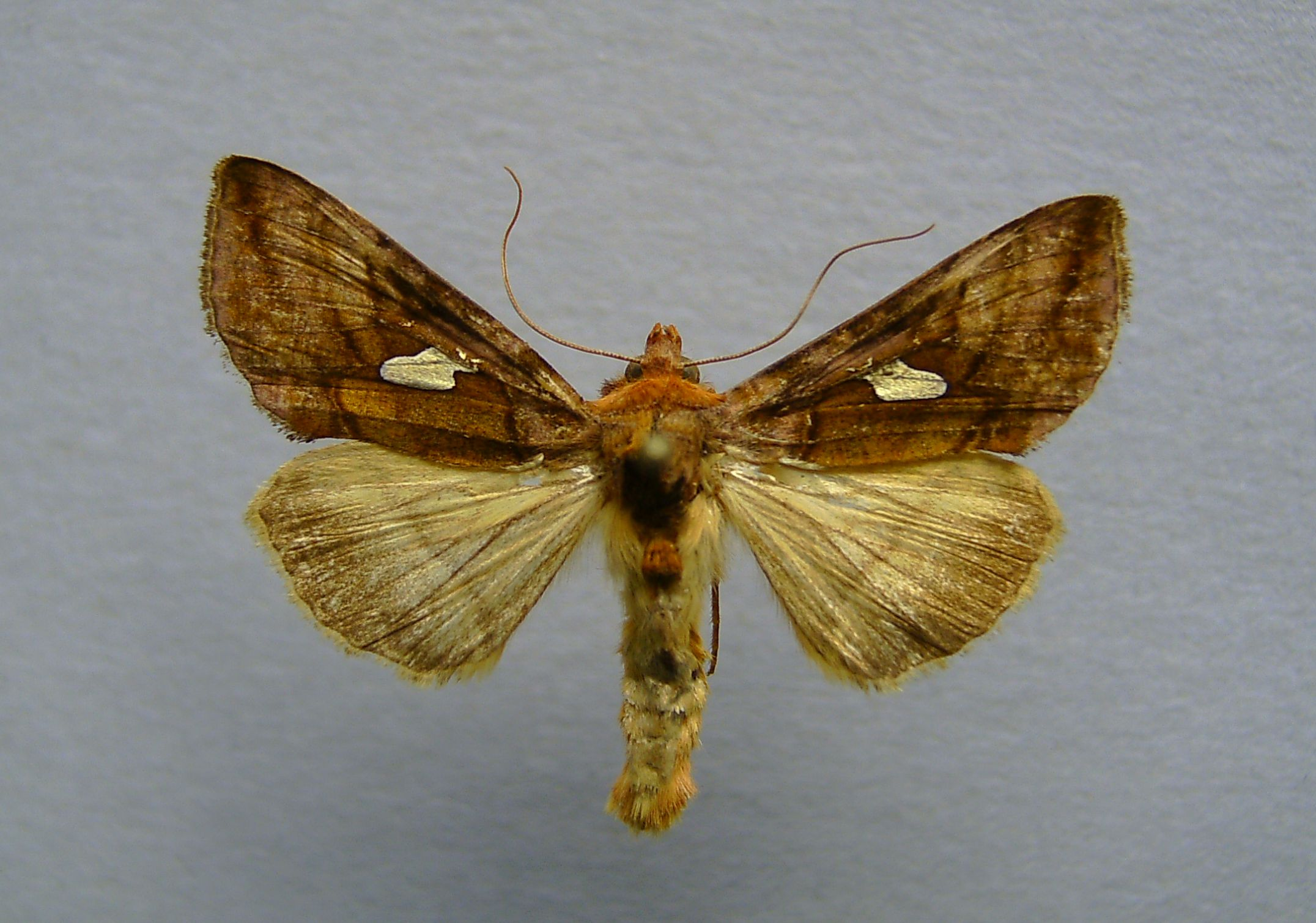
Autographa excelsa

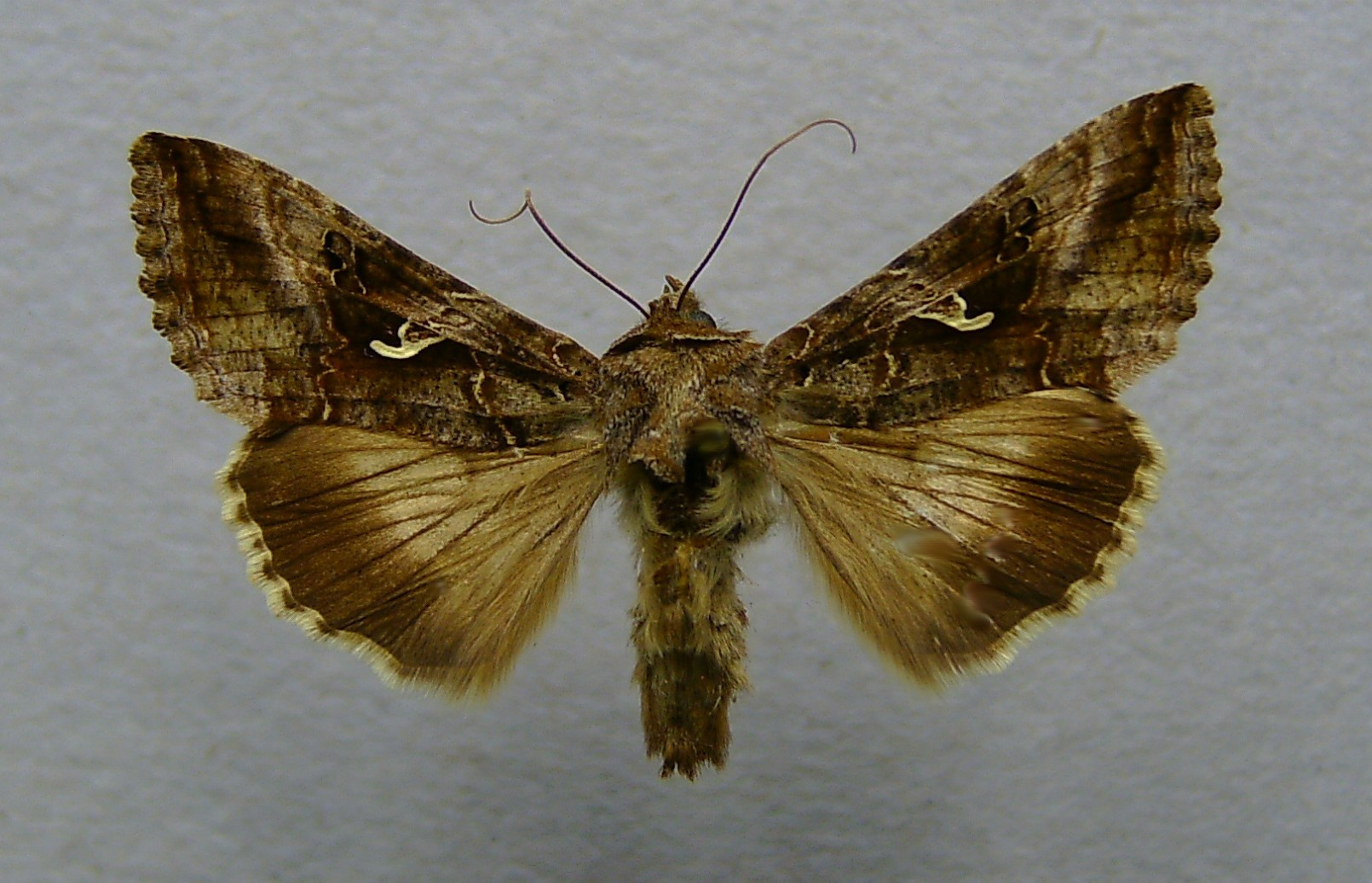
Autographa gamma

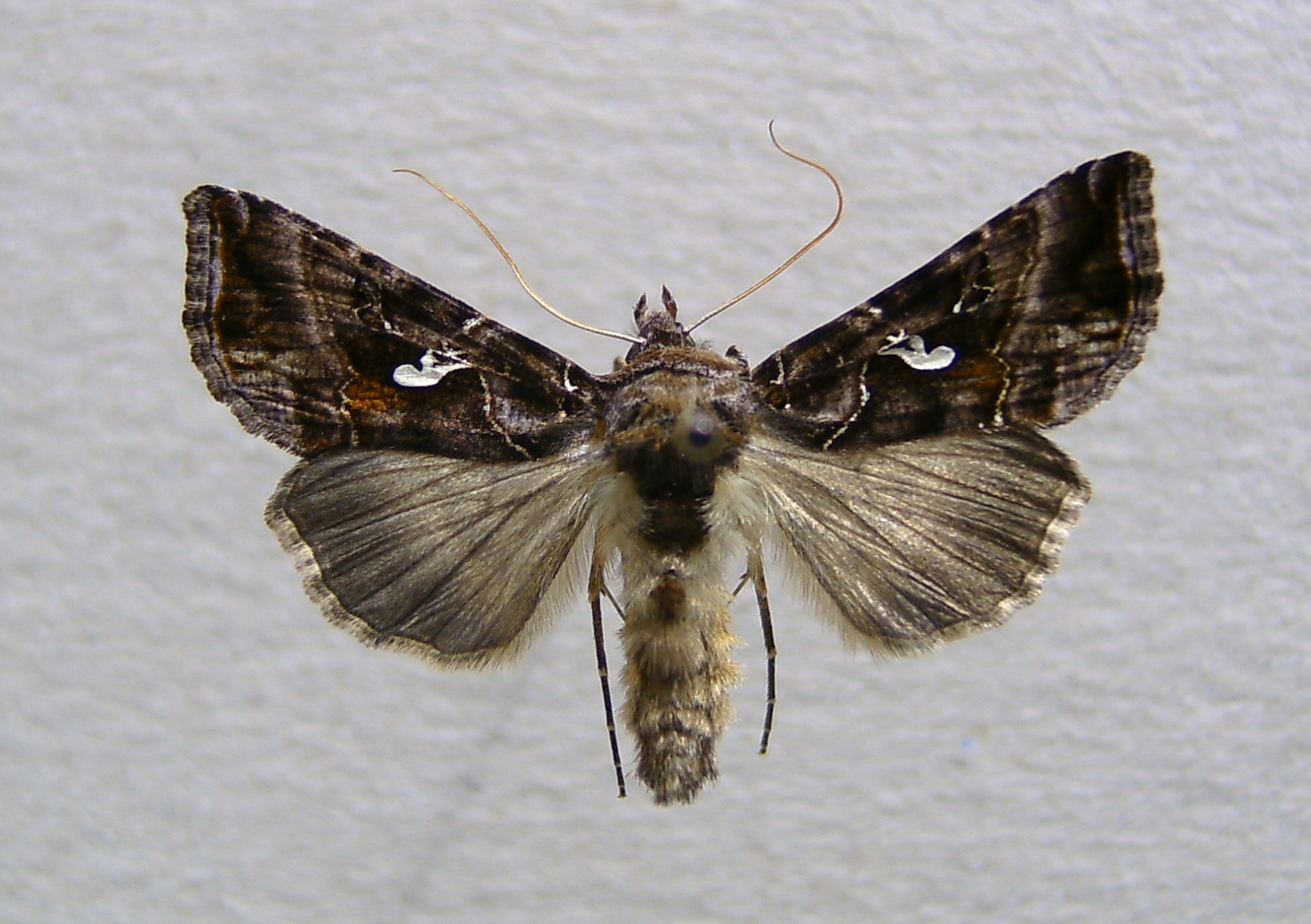
Autographa mandarina

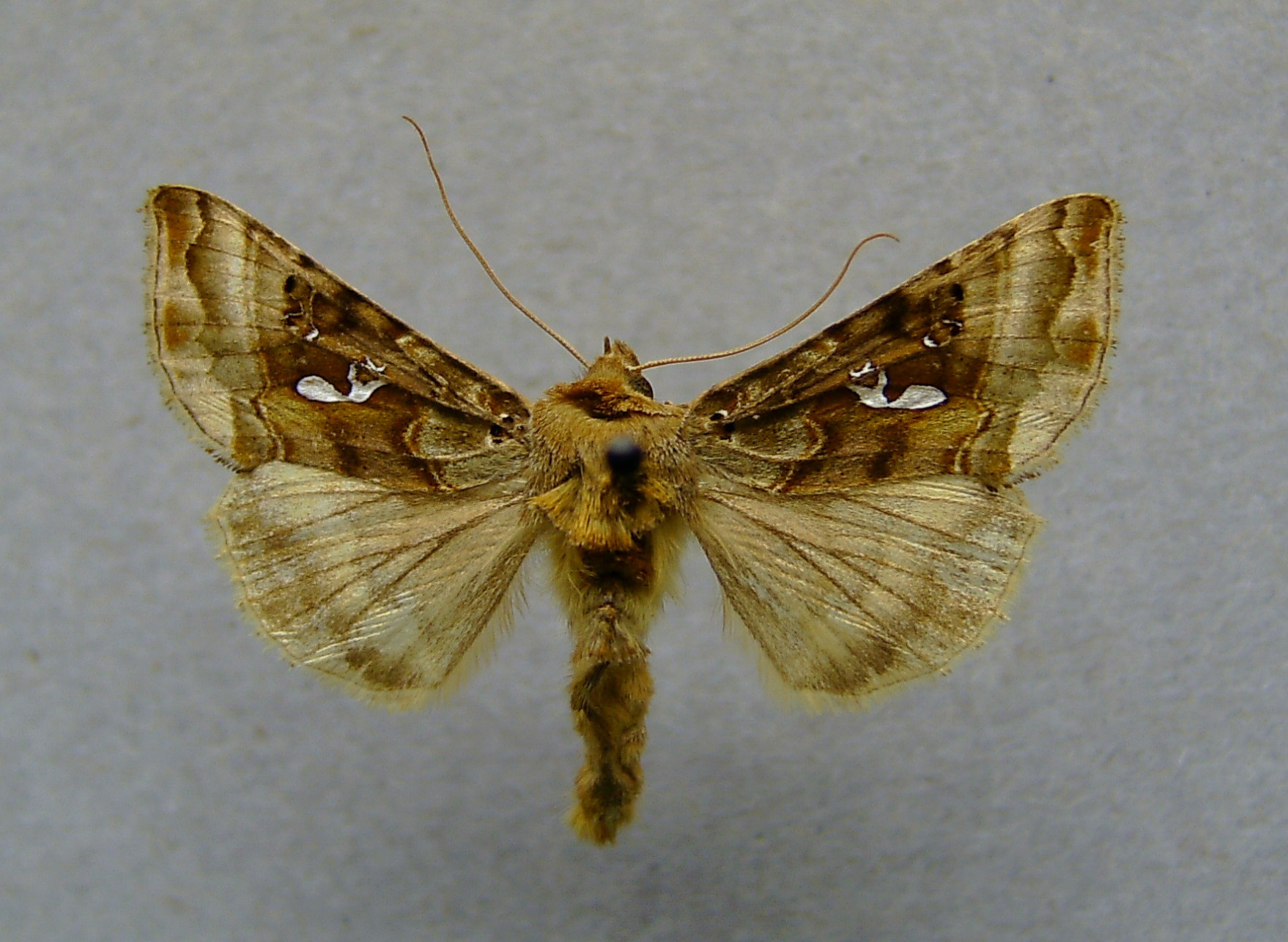
Autographa macrogamma

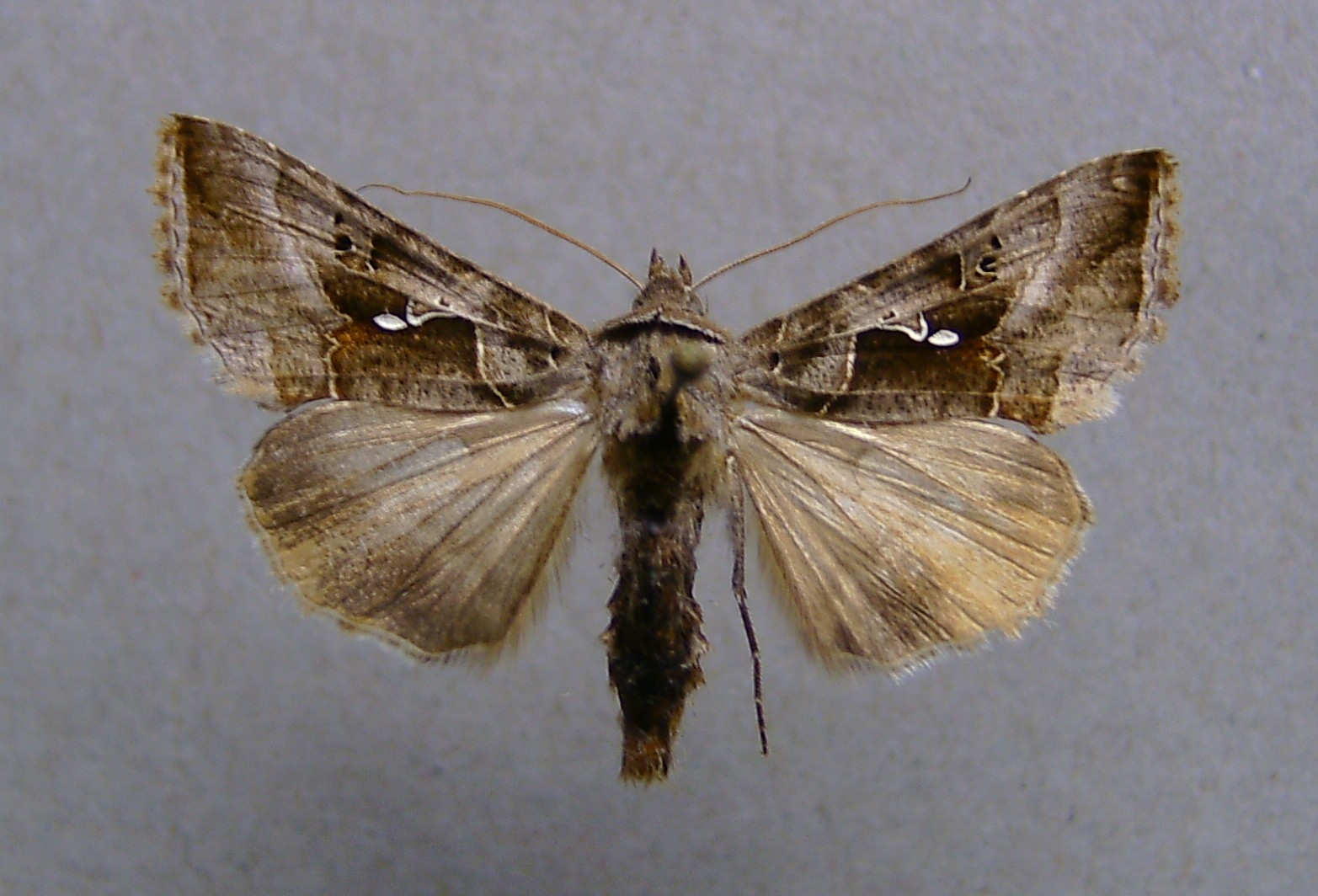
Autographa nigrisigna

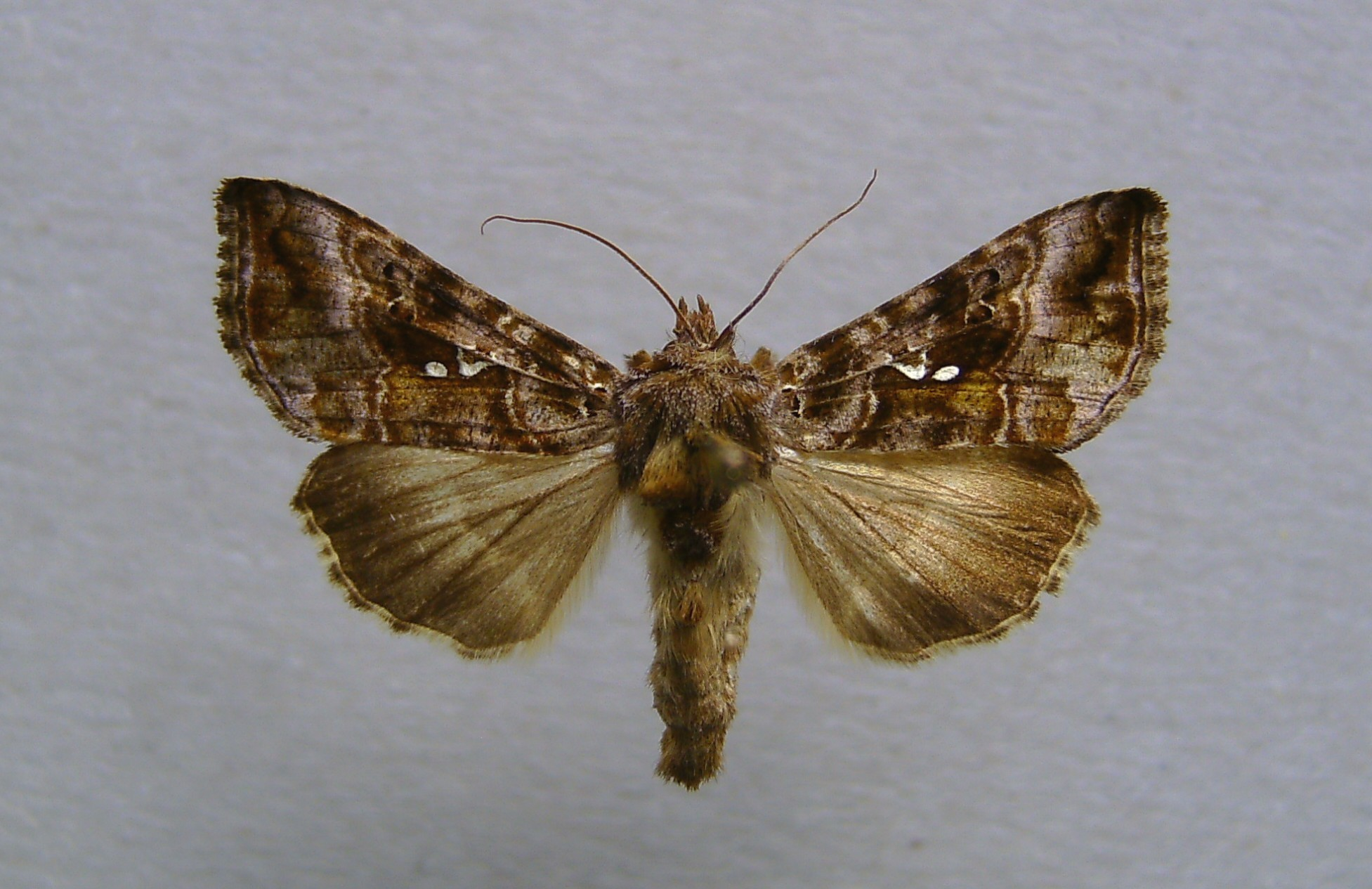
Autographa buraetica

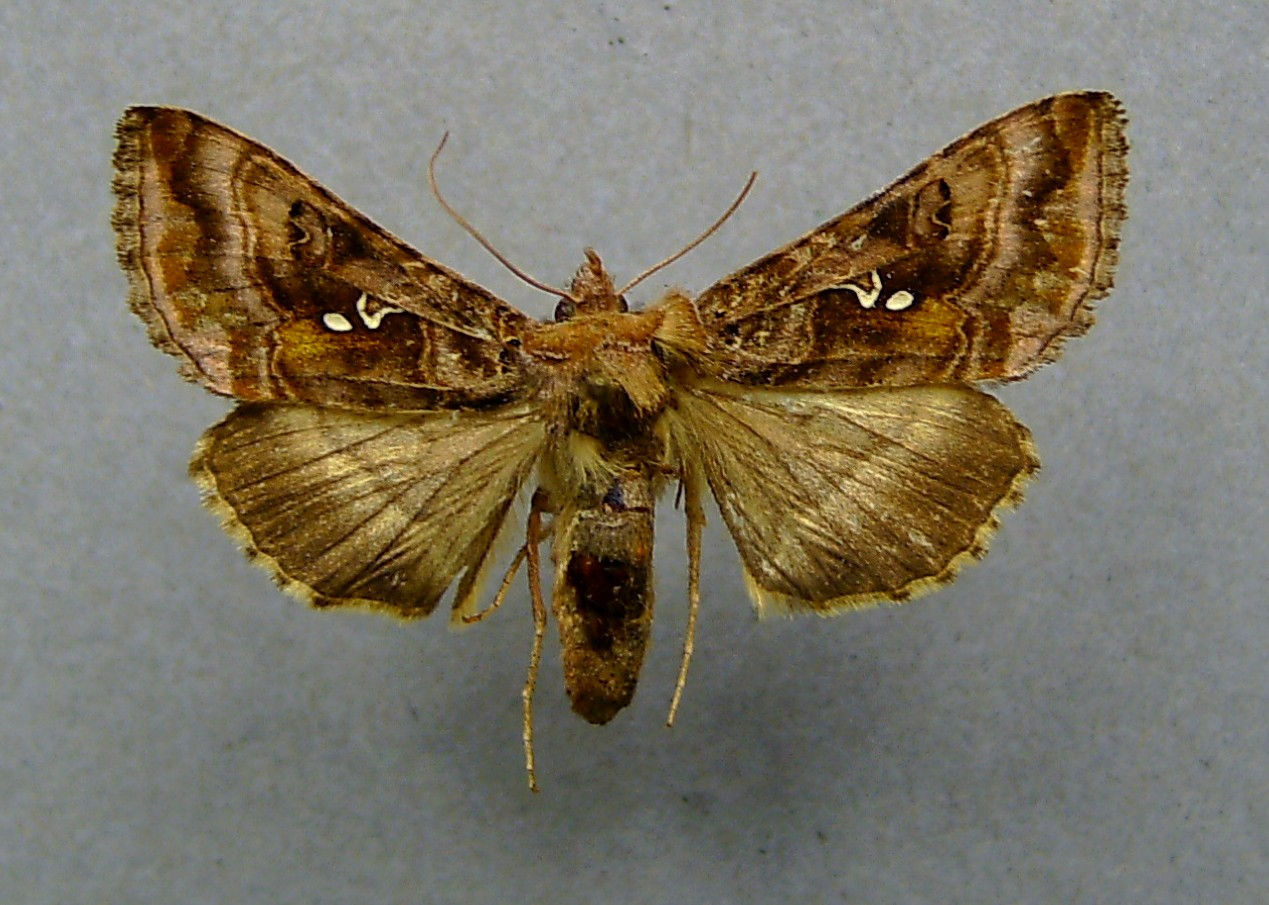
Autographa pulchrina

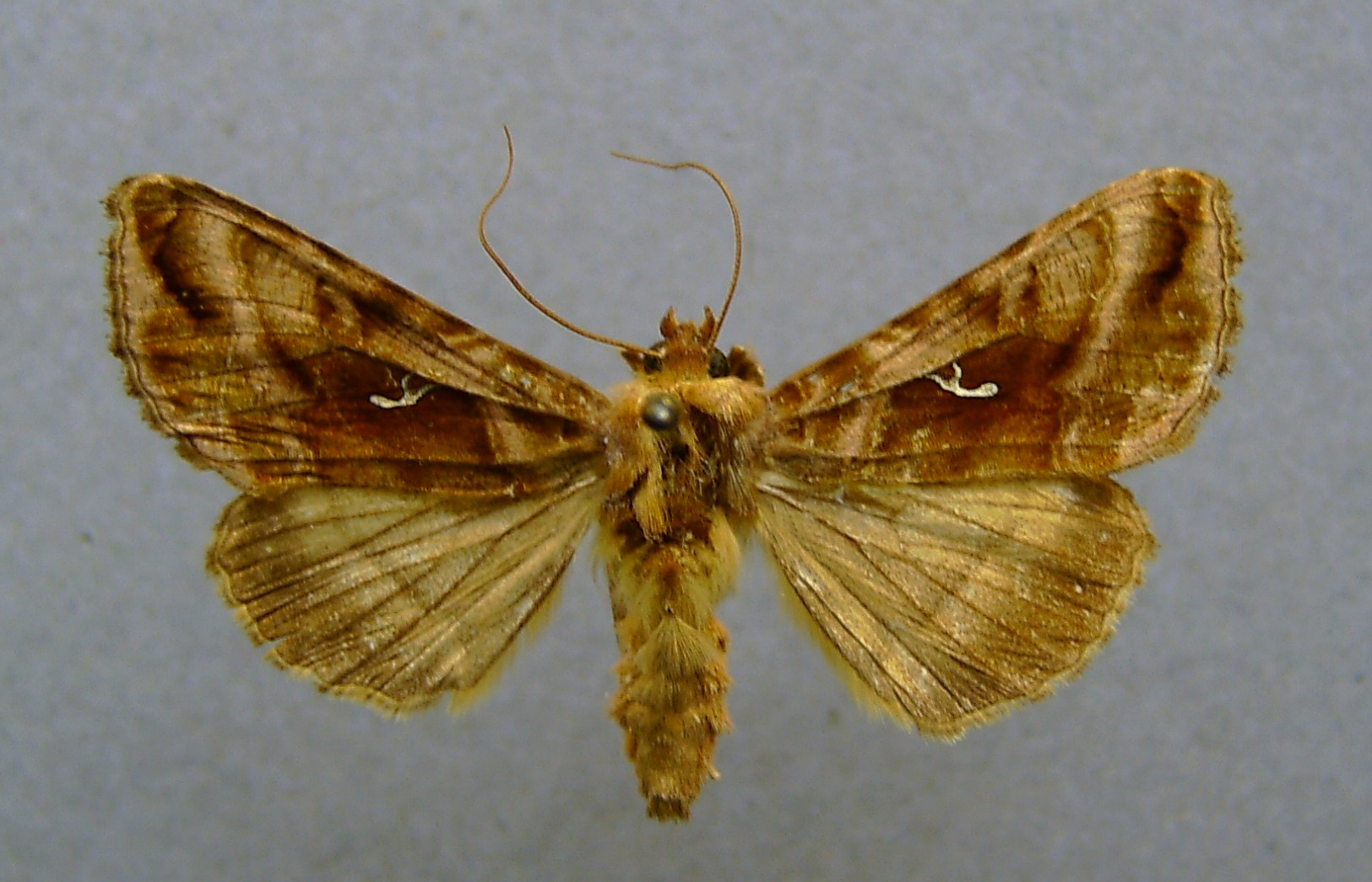
Autographa jota

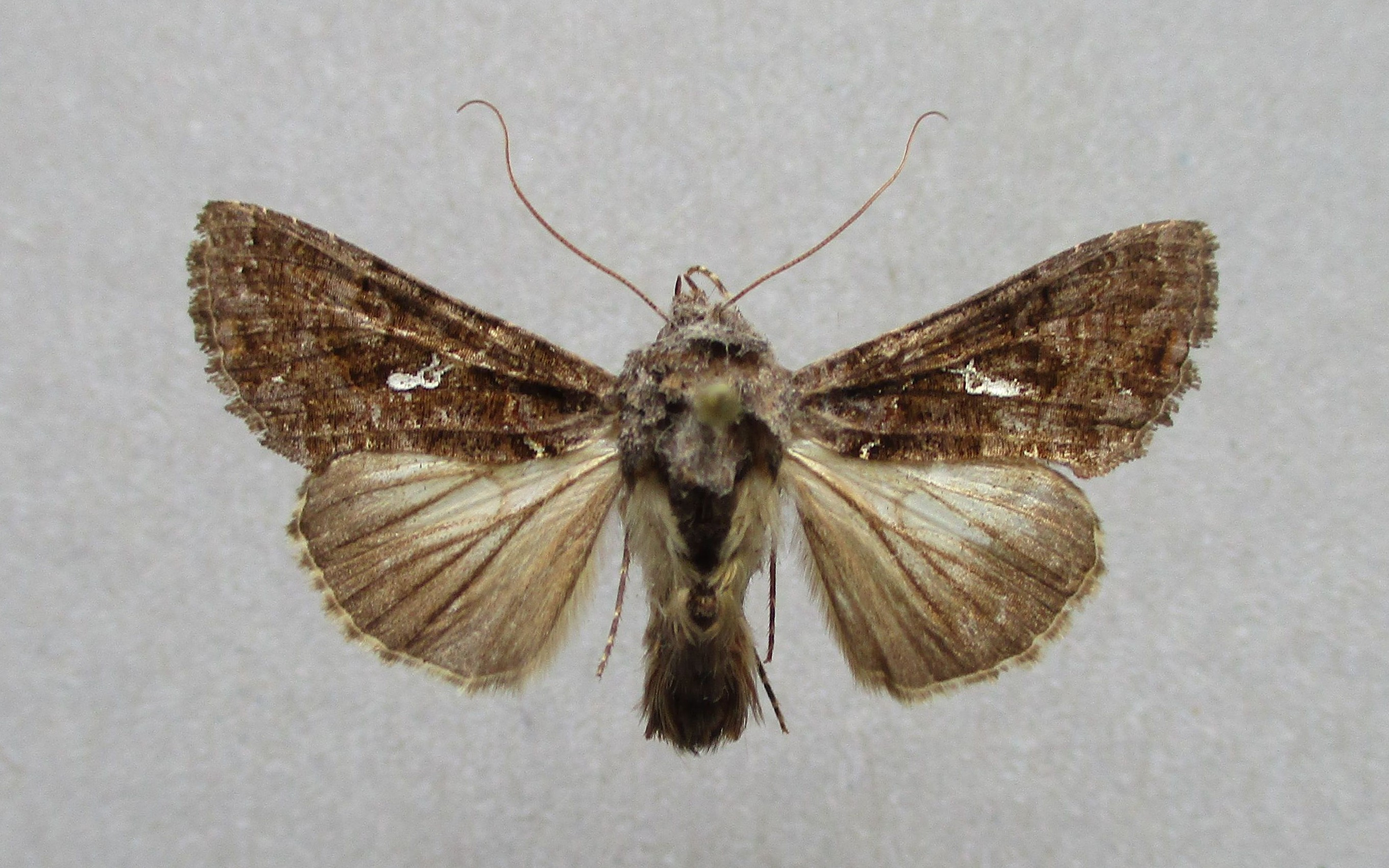
Ctenoplusia limbirena

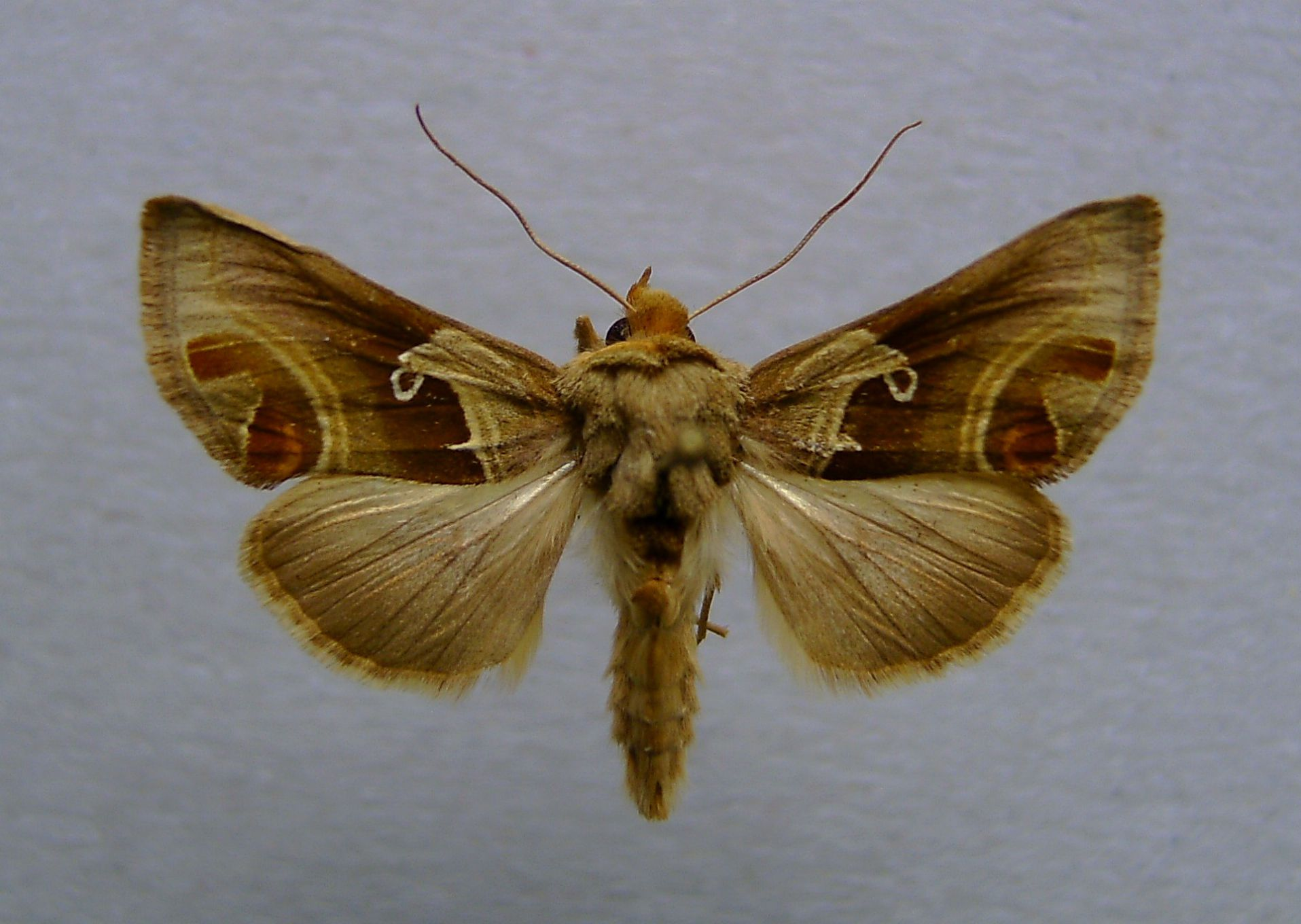
Euchalcia taurica

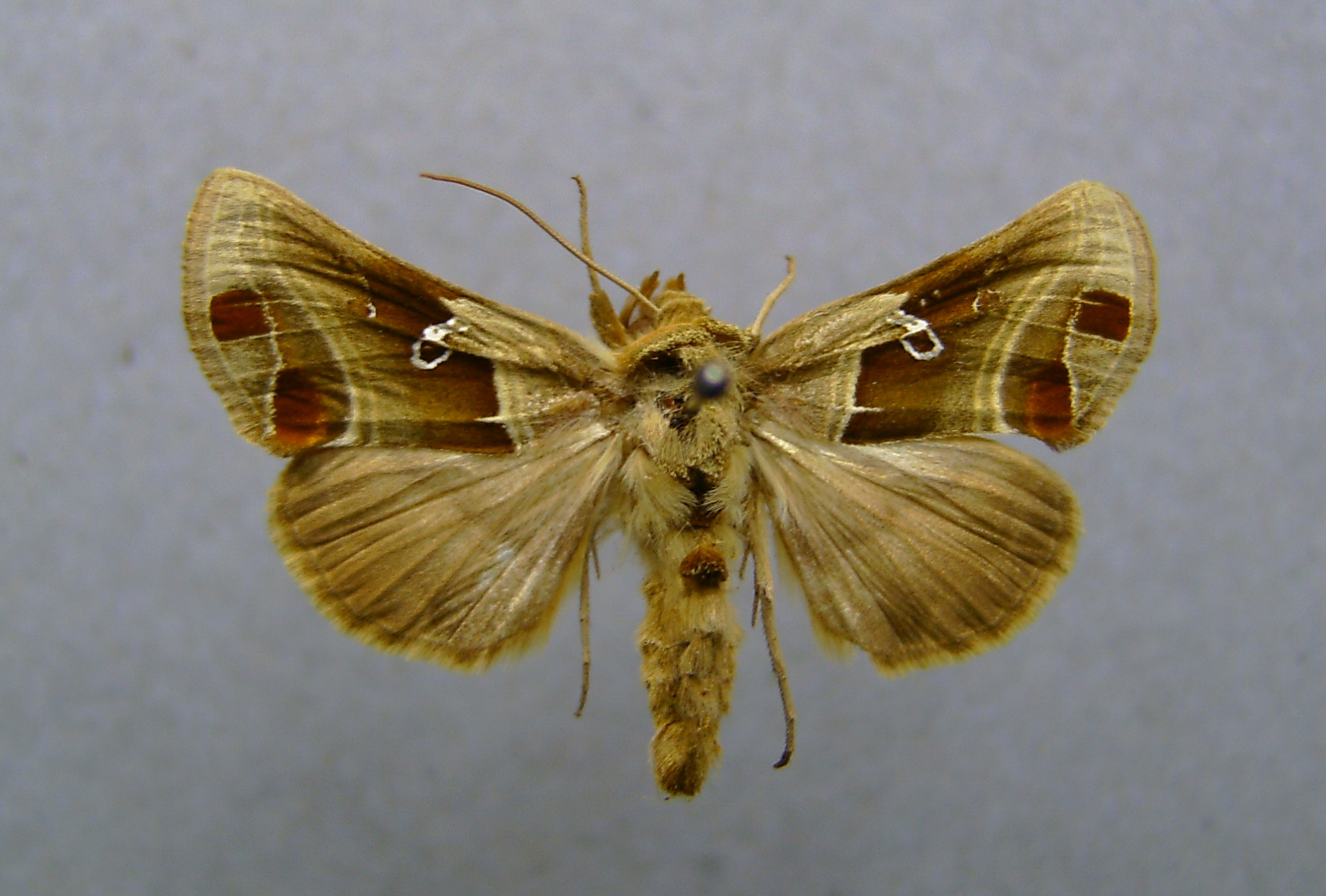
Euchalcia consona

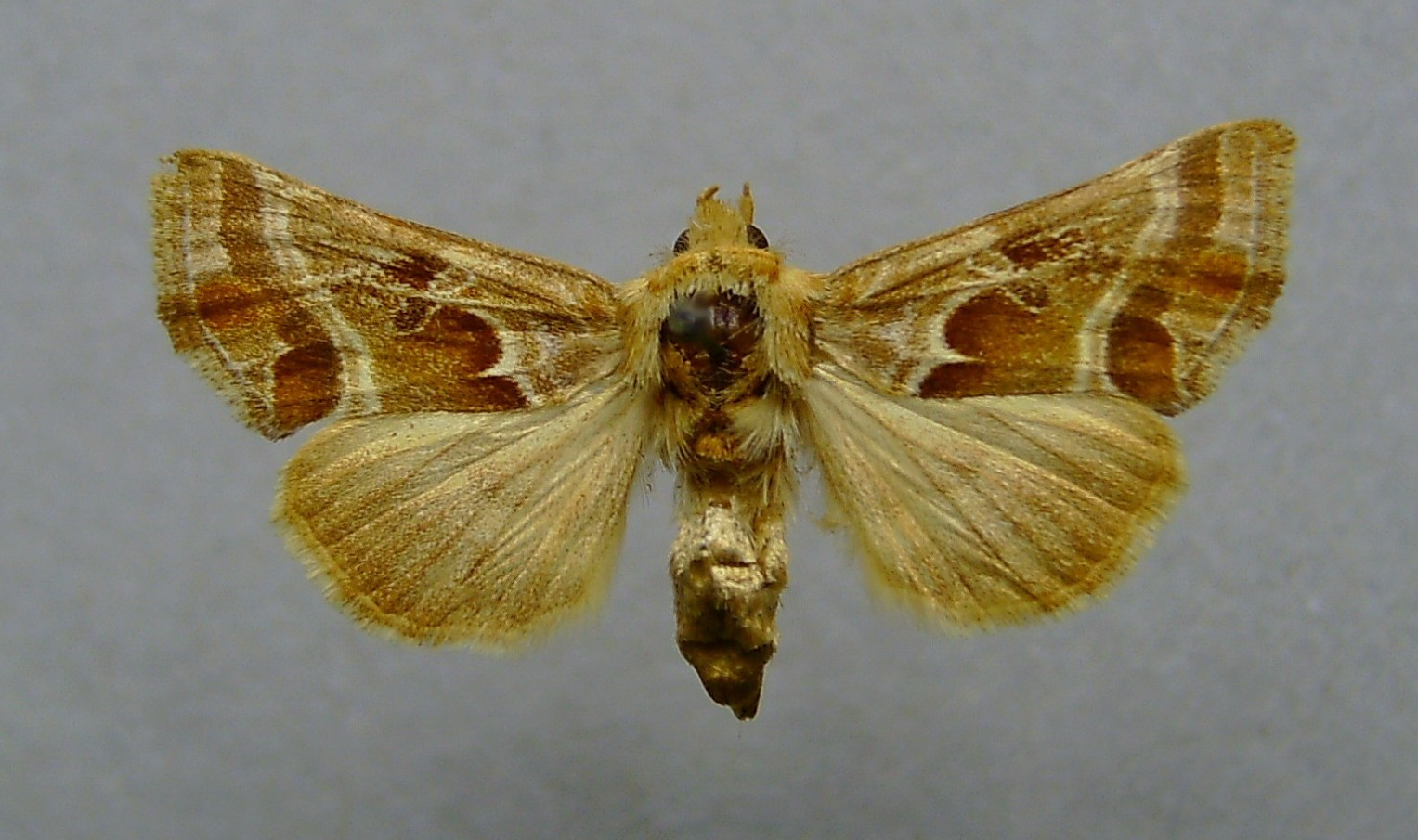
Euchalcia siderifera

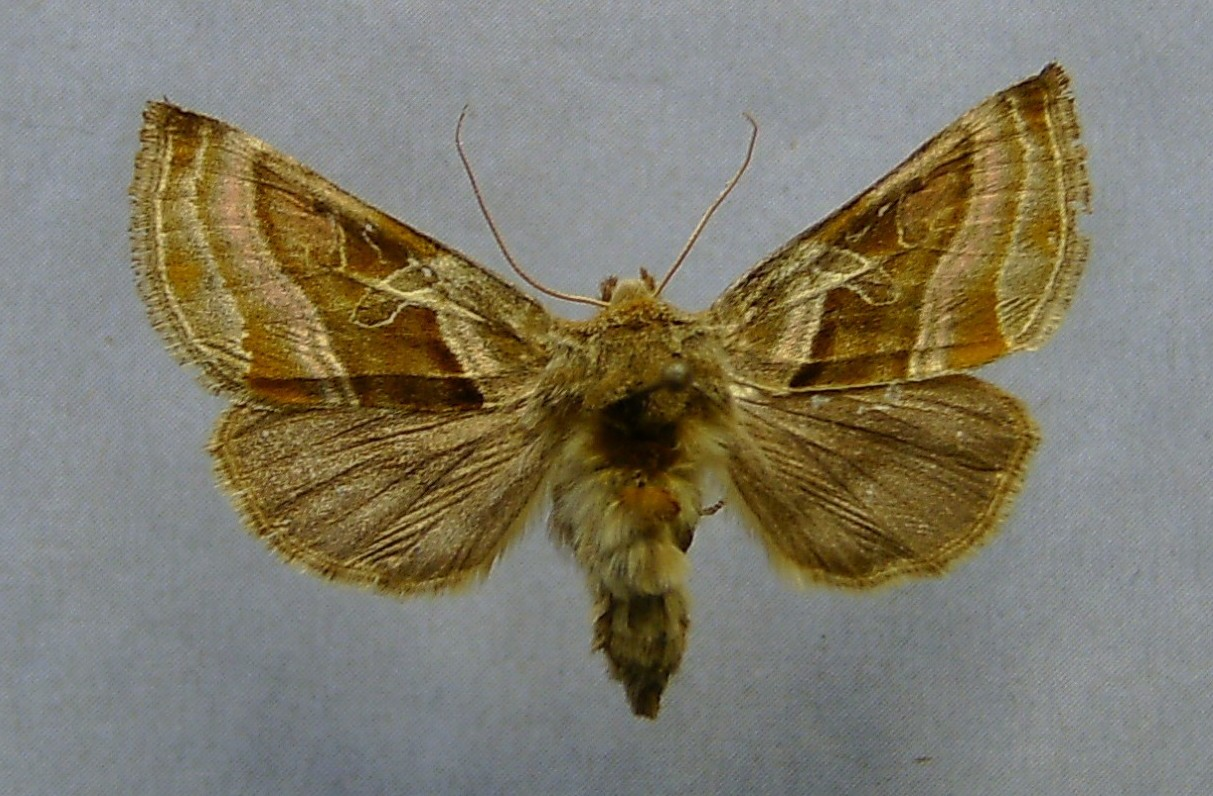
Euchalcia variabilis

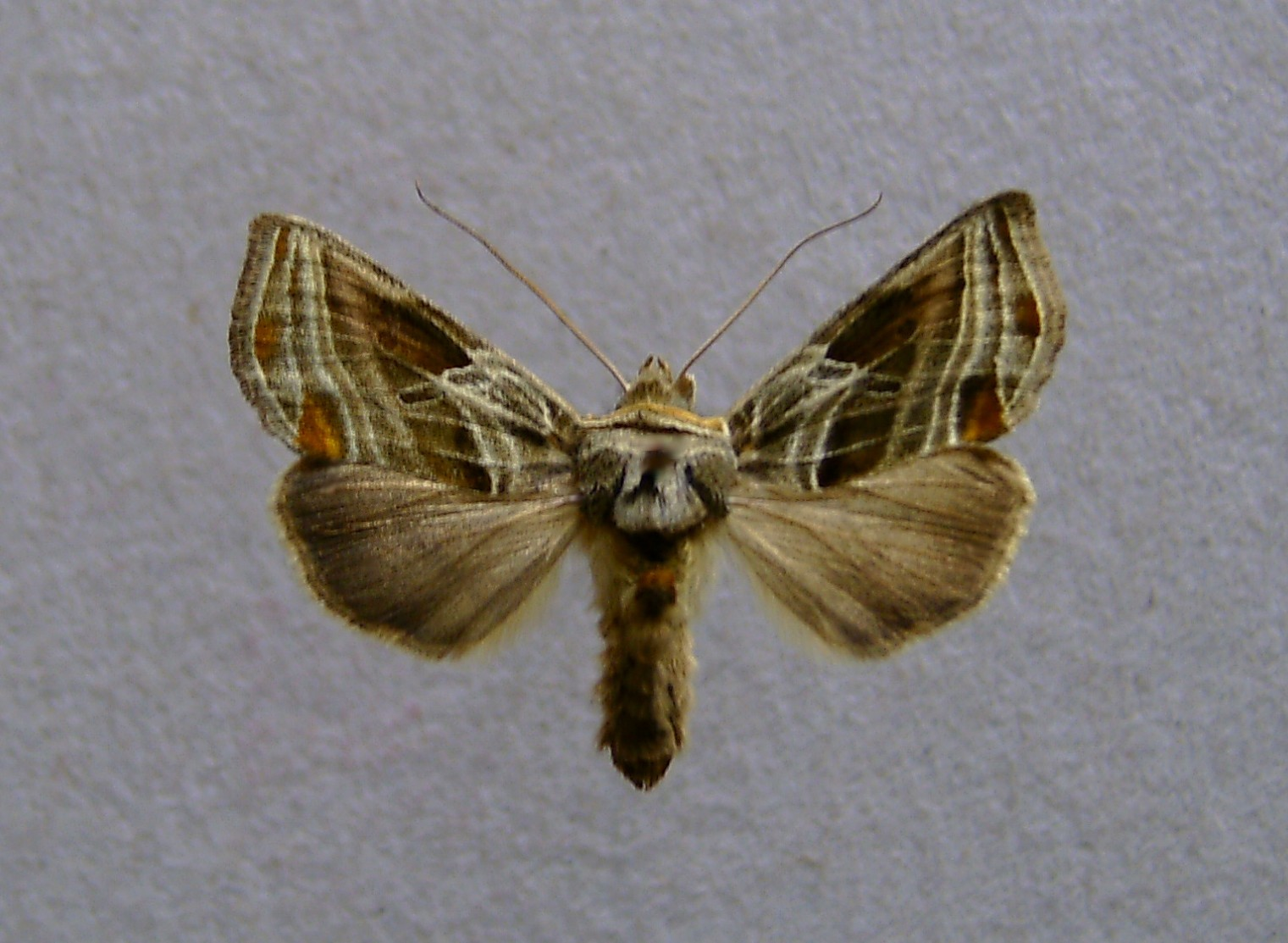
Euchalcia modestoides

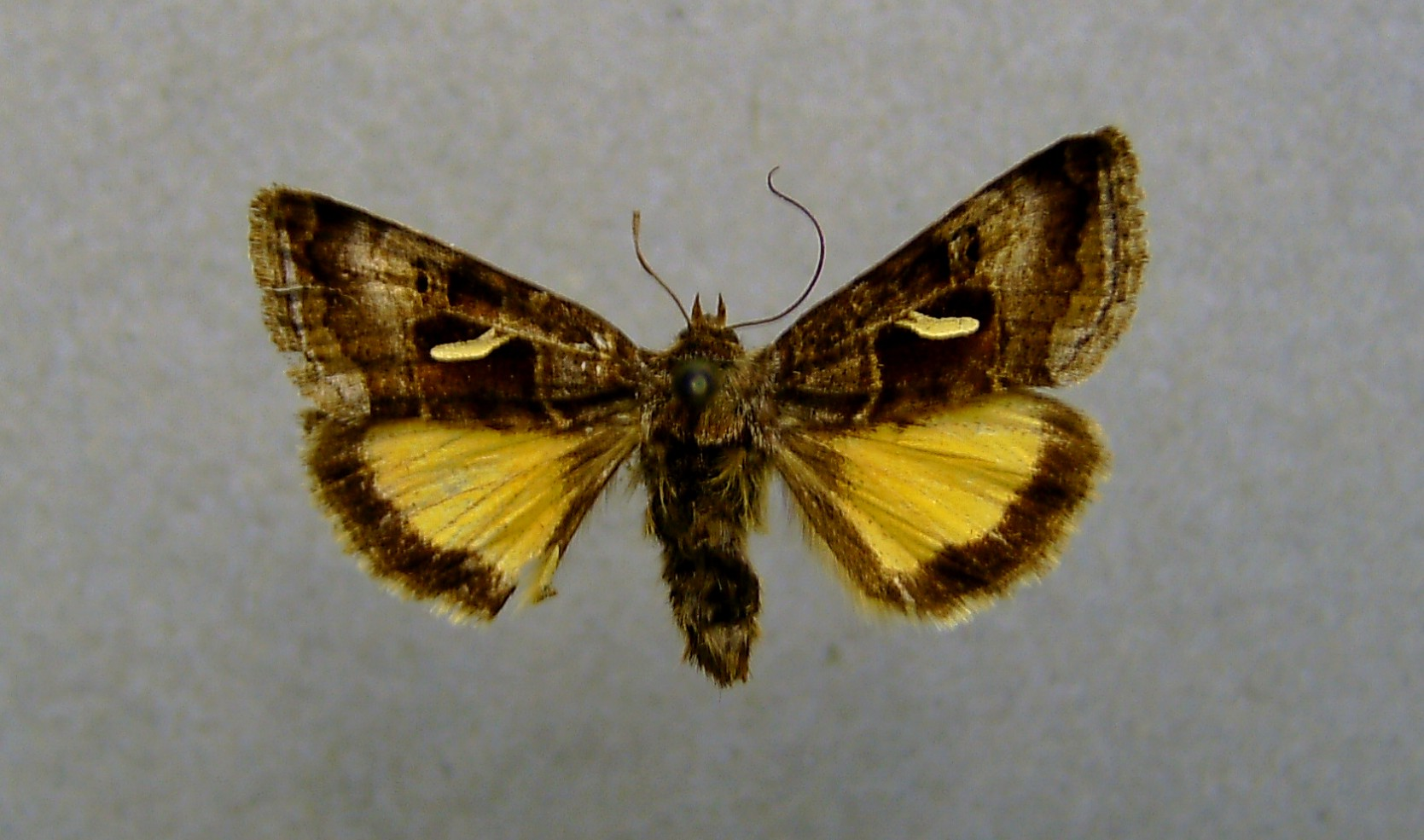
Syngrapha hochenwarthi

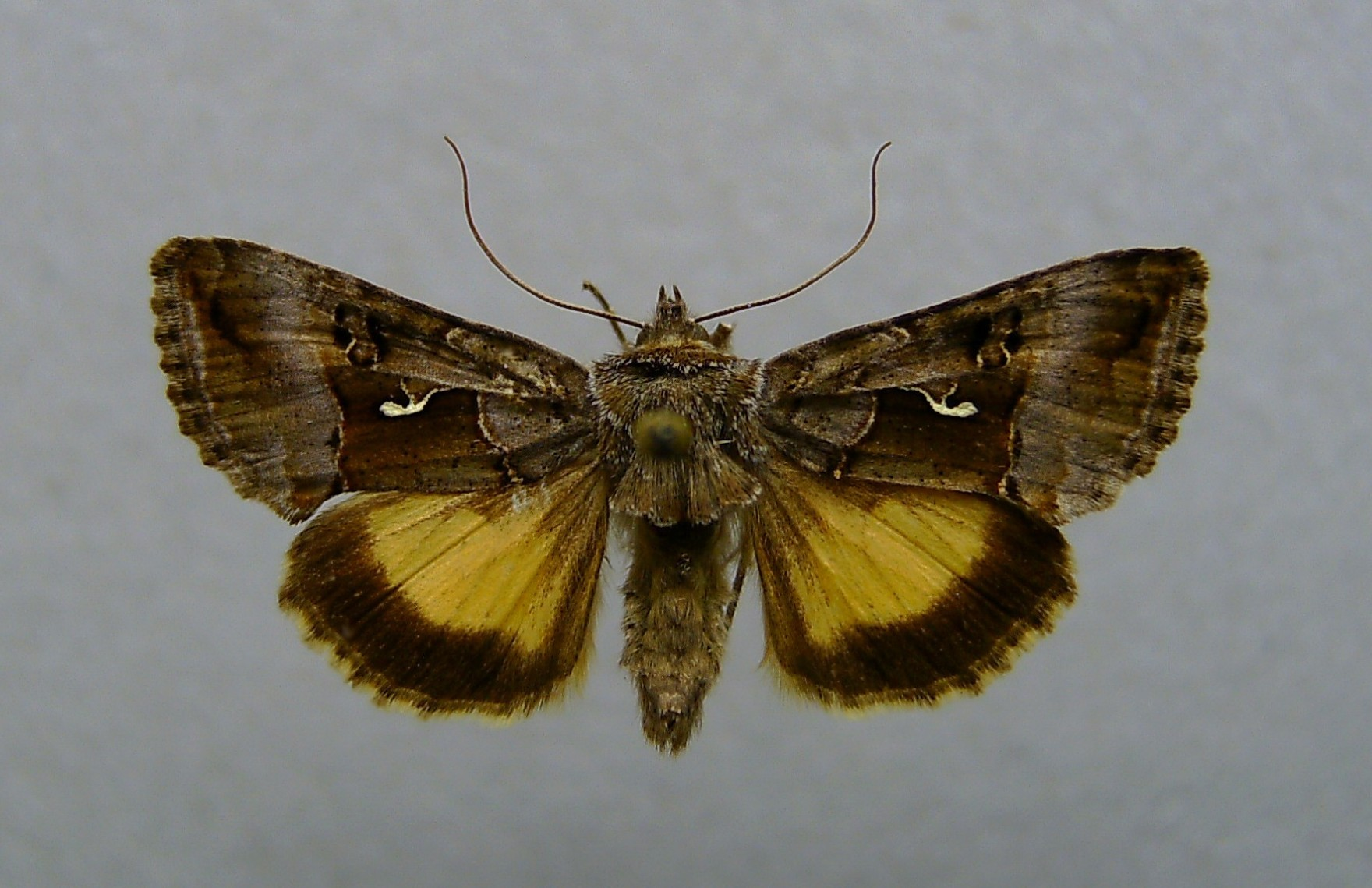
Syngrapha microgamma

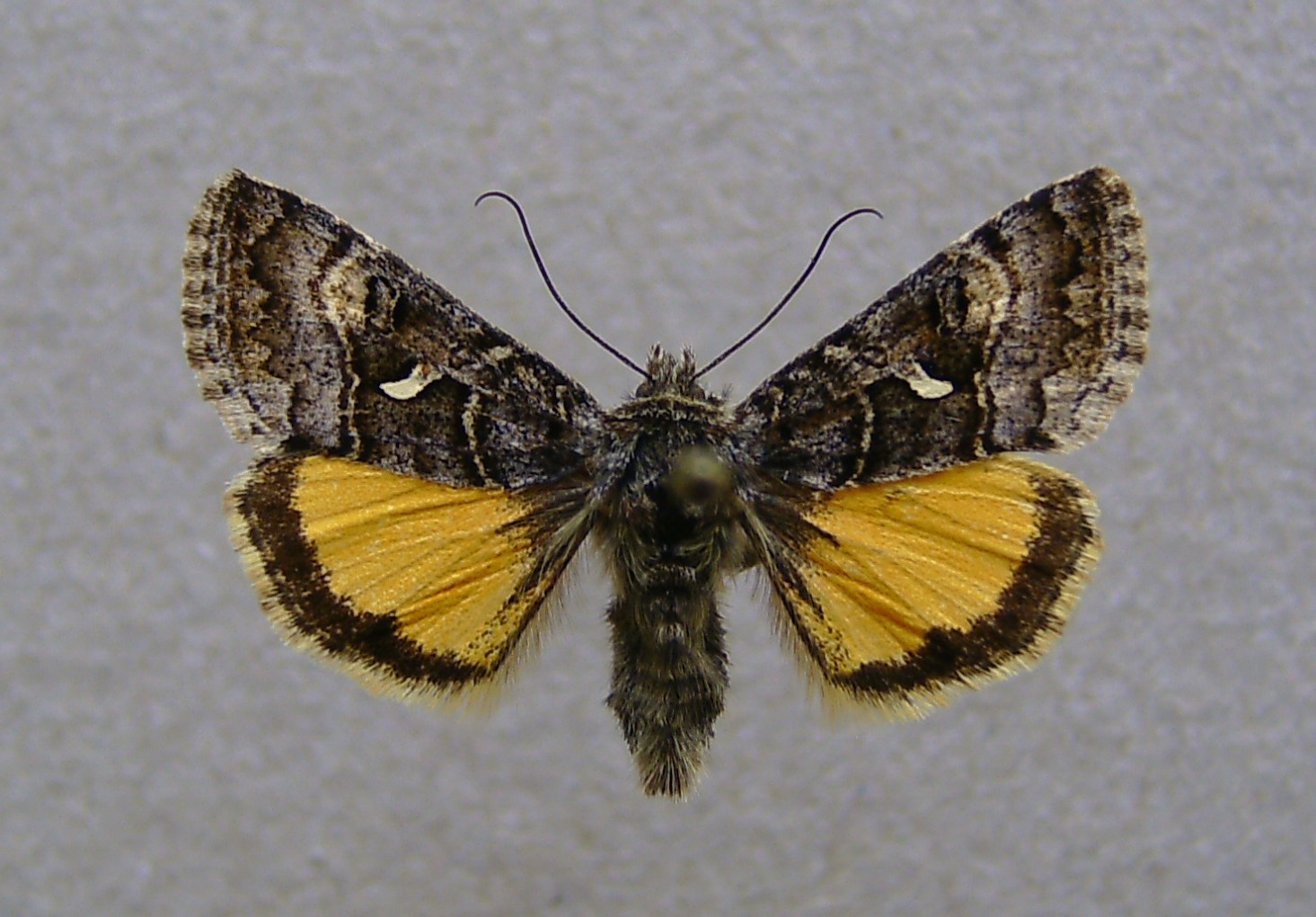
Syngrapha devergens

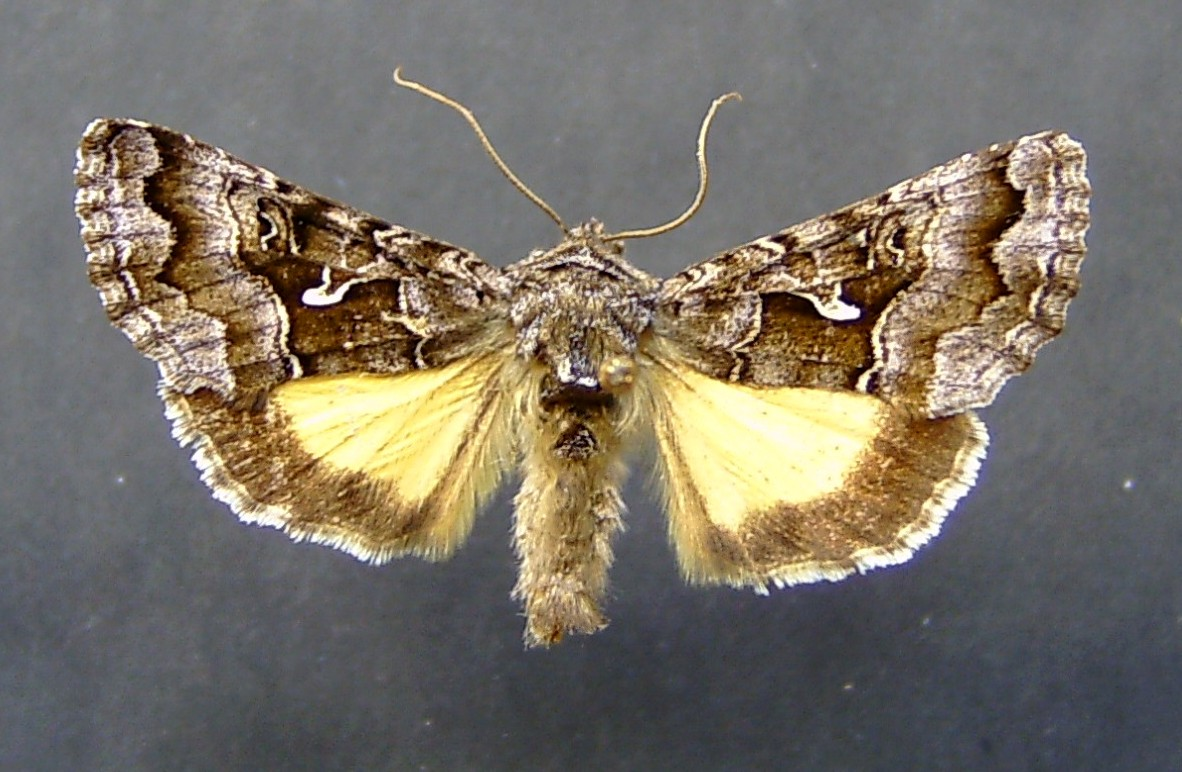
Syngrapha ain

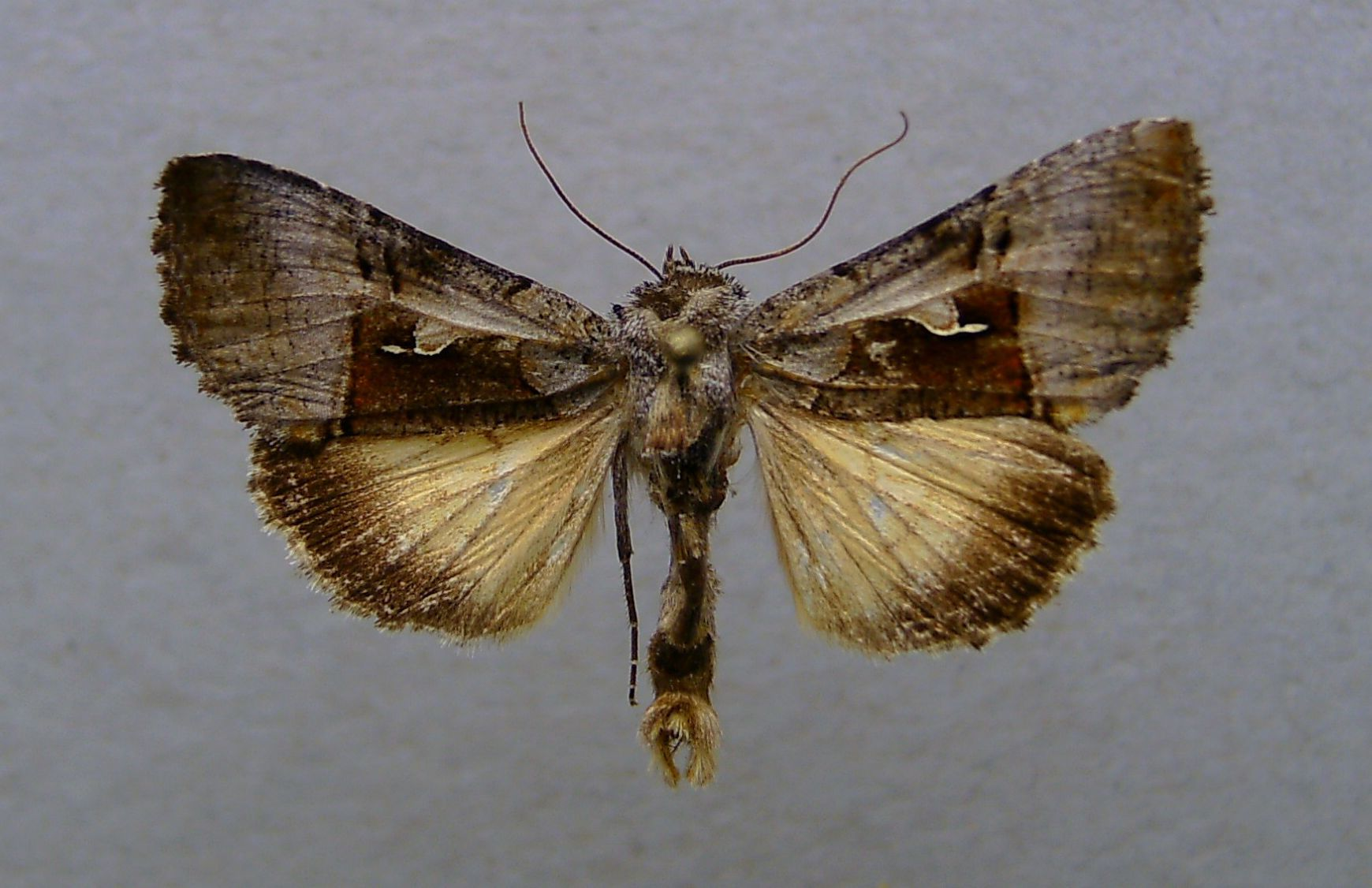
Syngrapha diasema

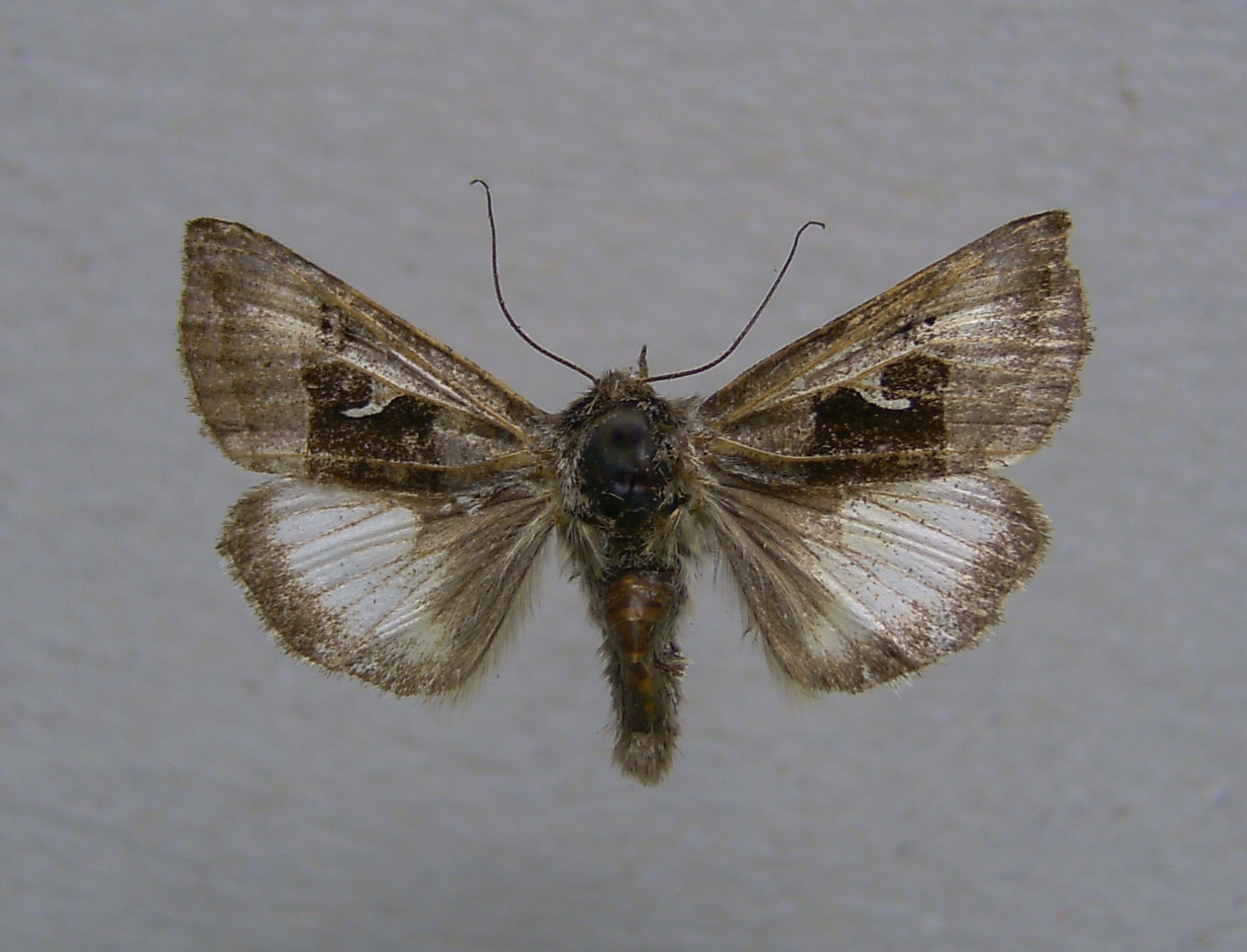
Syngrapha parilis

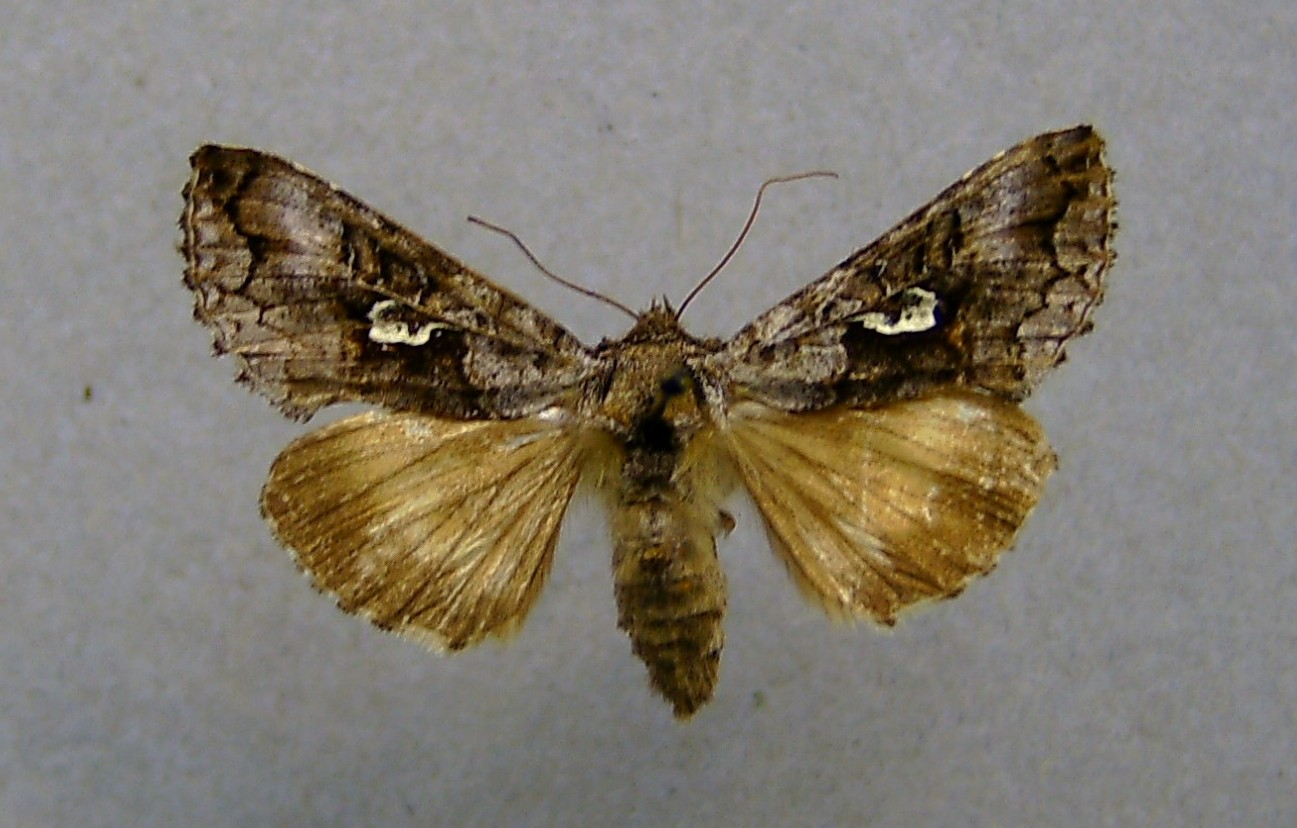
Syngrapha interrogationis

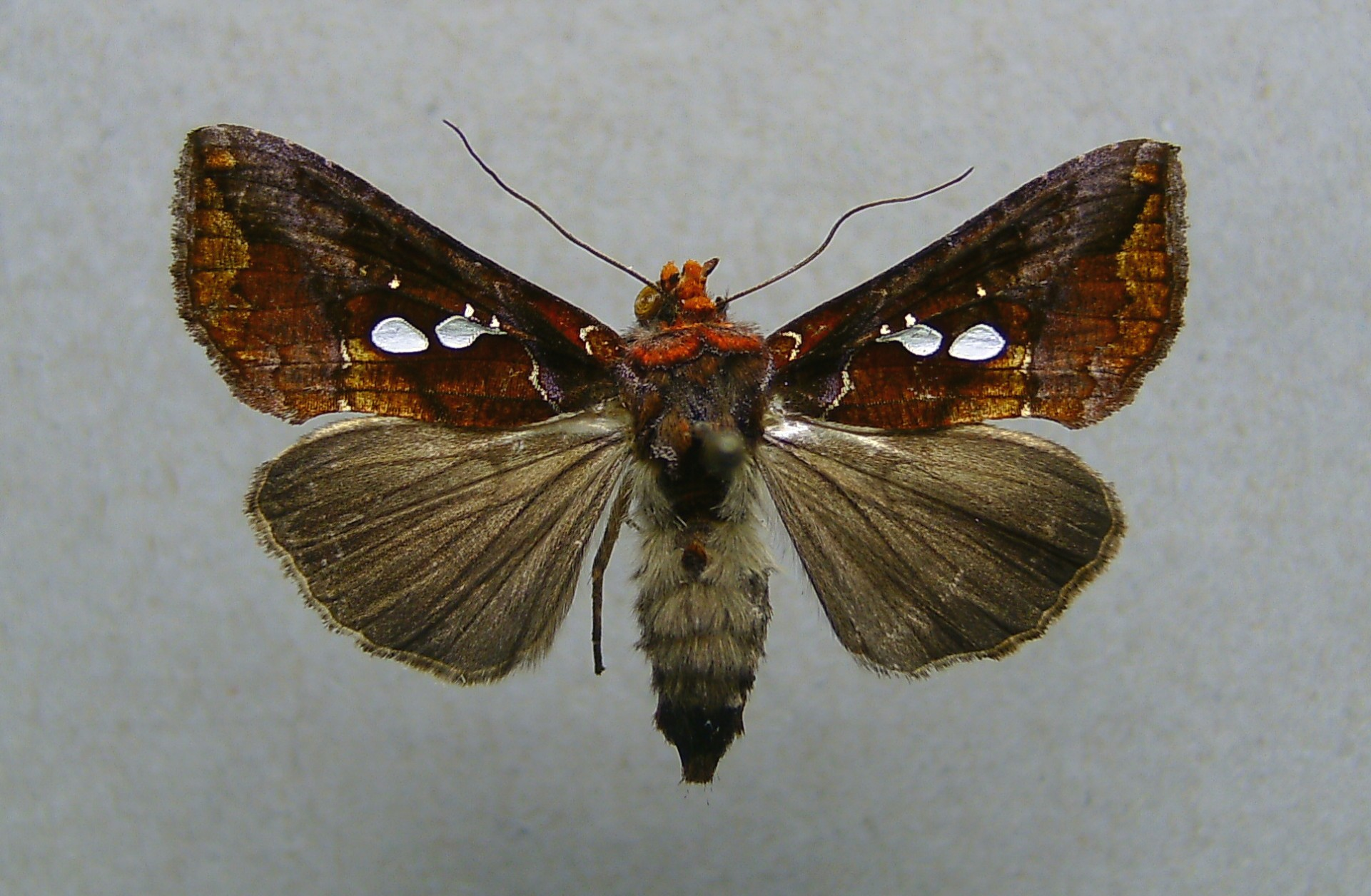
Antoculeora ornatissima

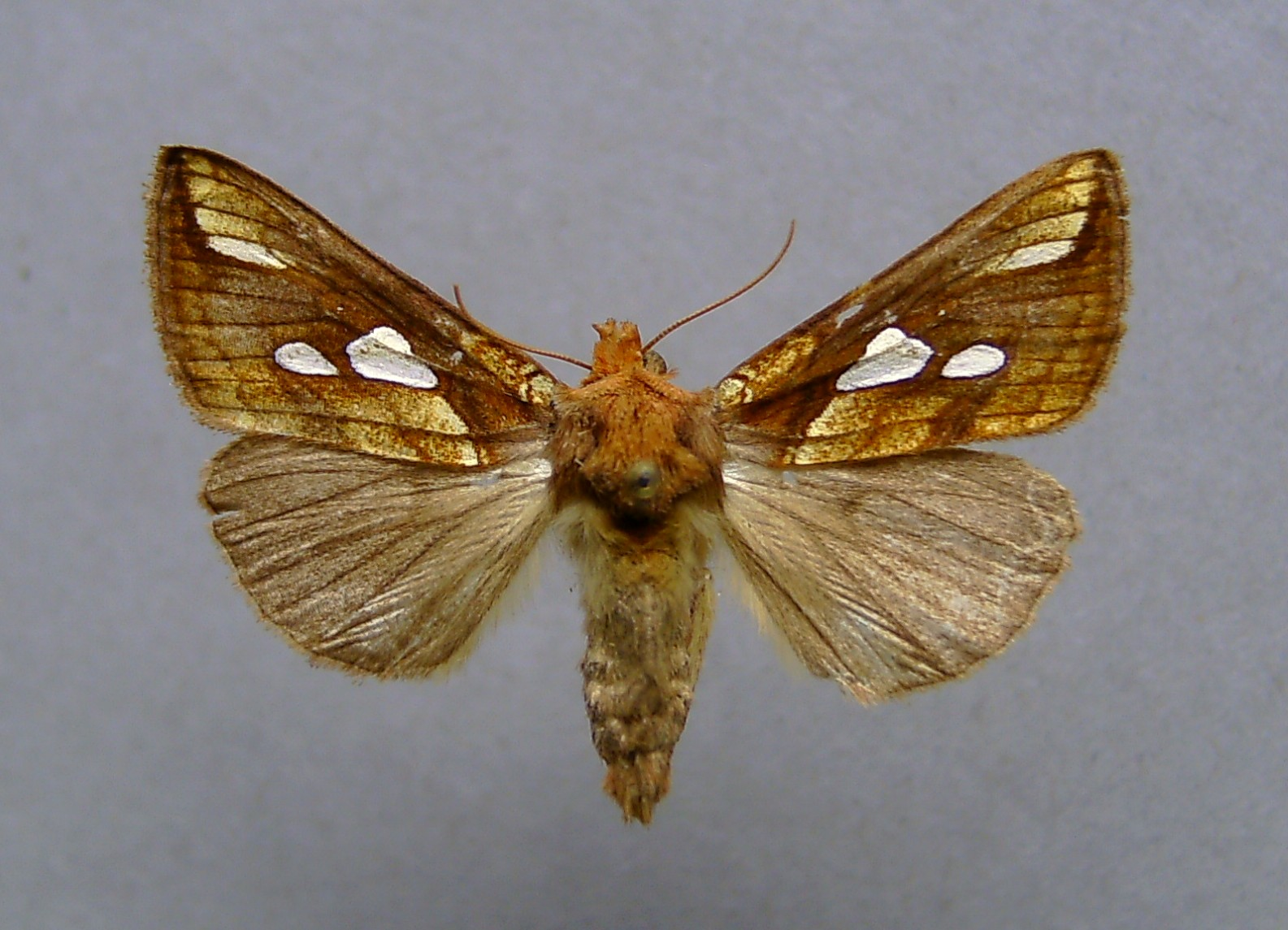
Plusia festucae

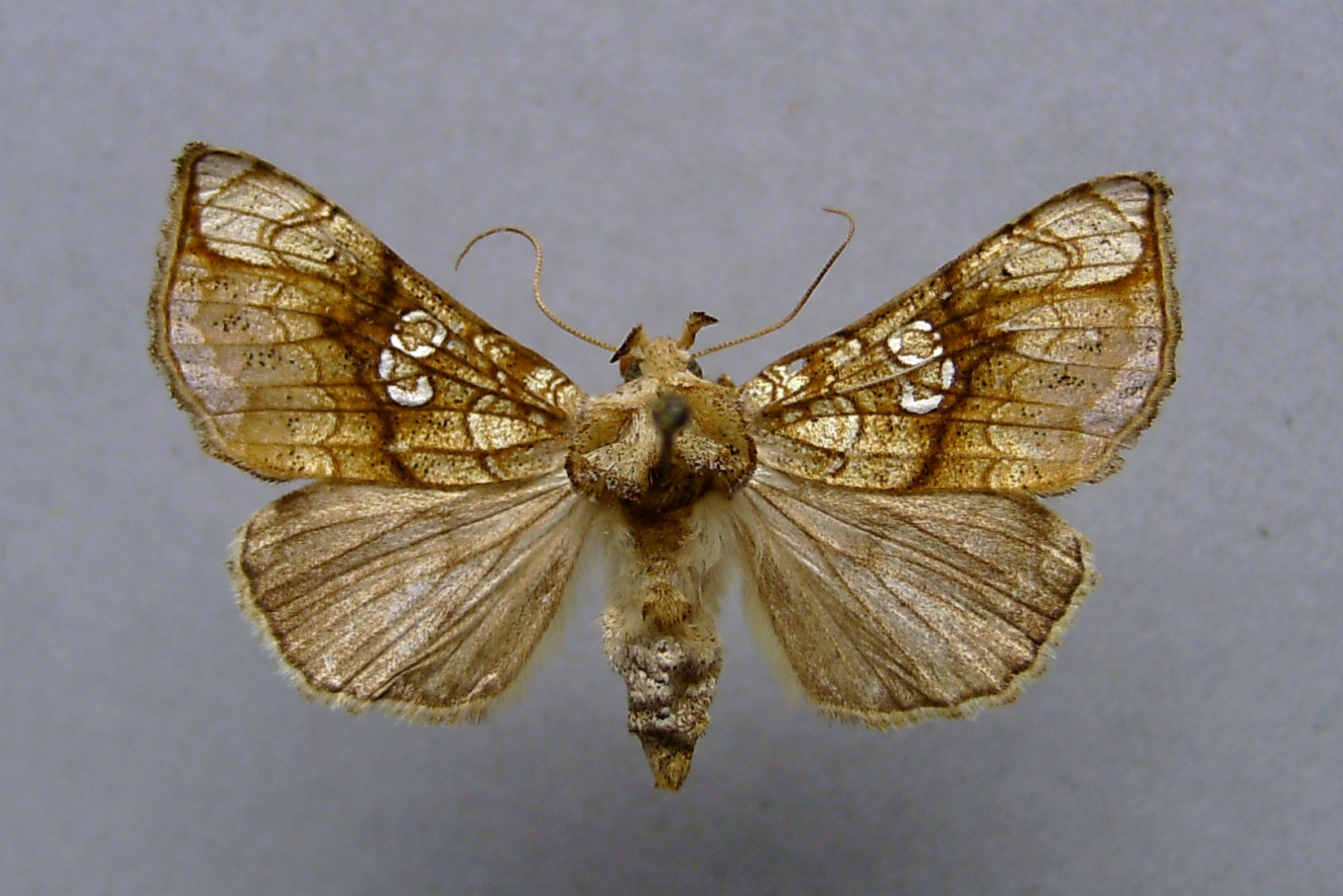
Polychrysia moneta

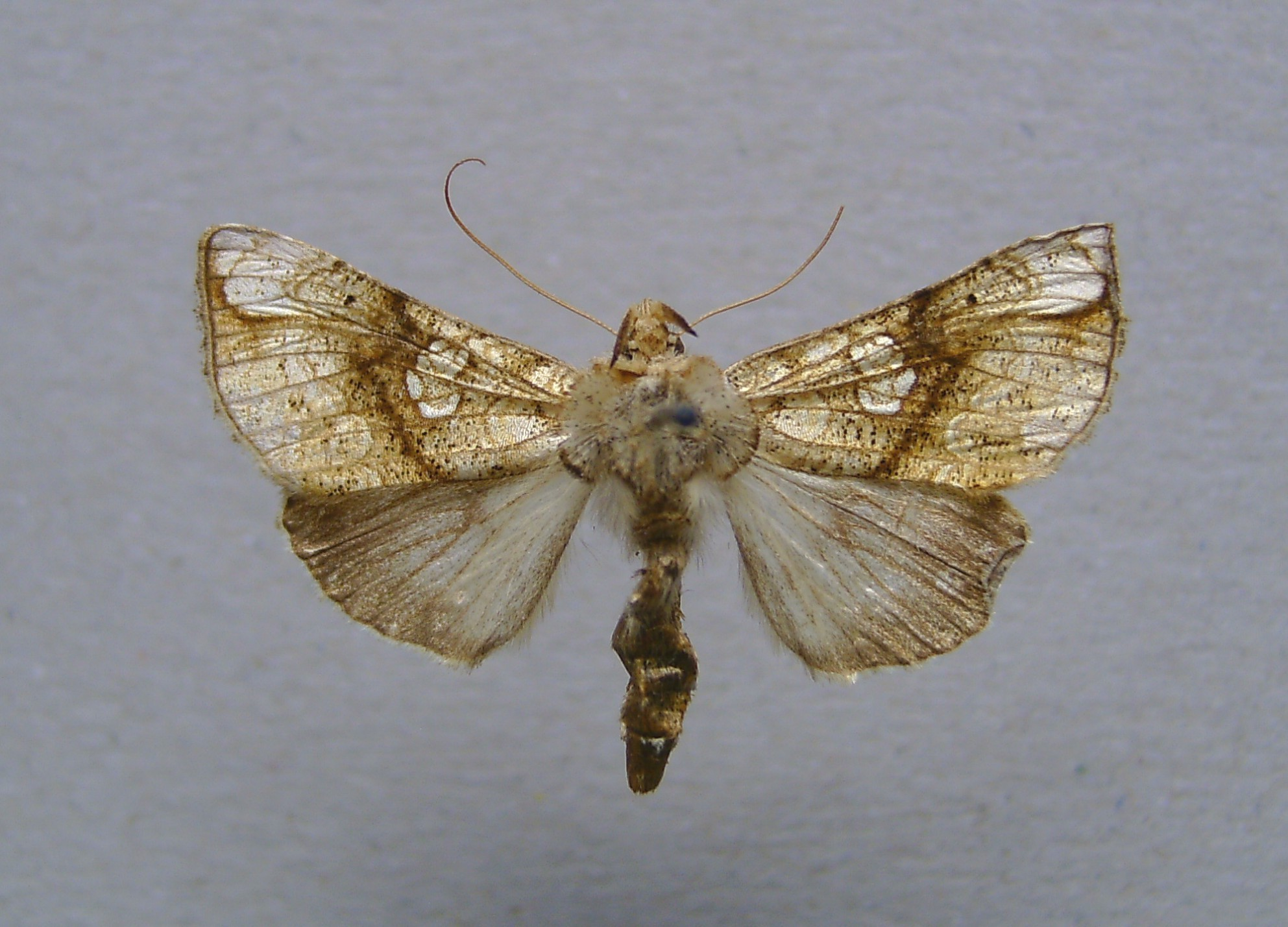
Polychrysia esmeralda

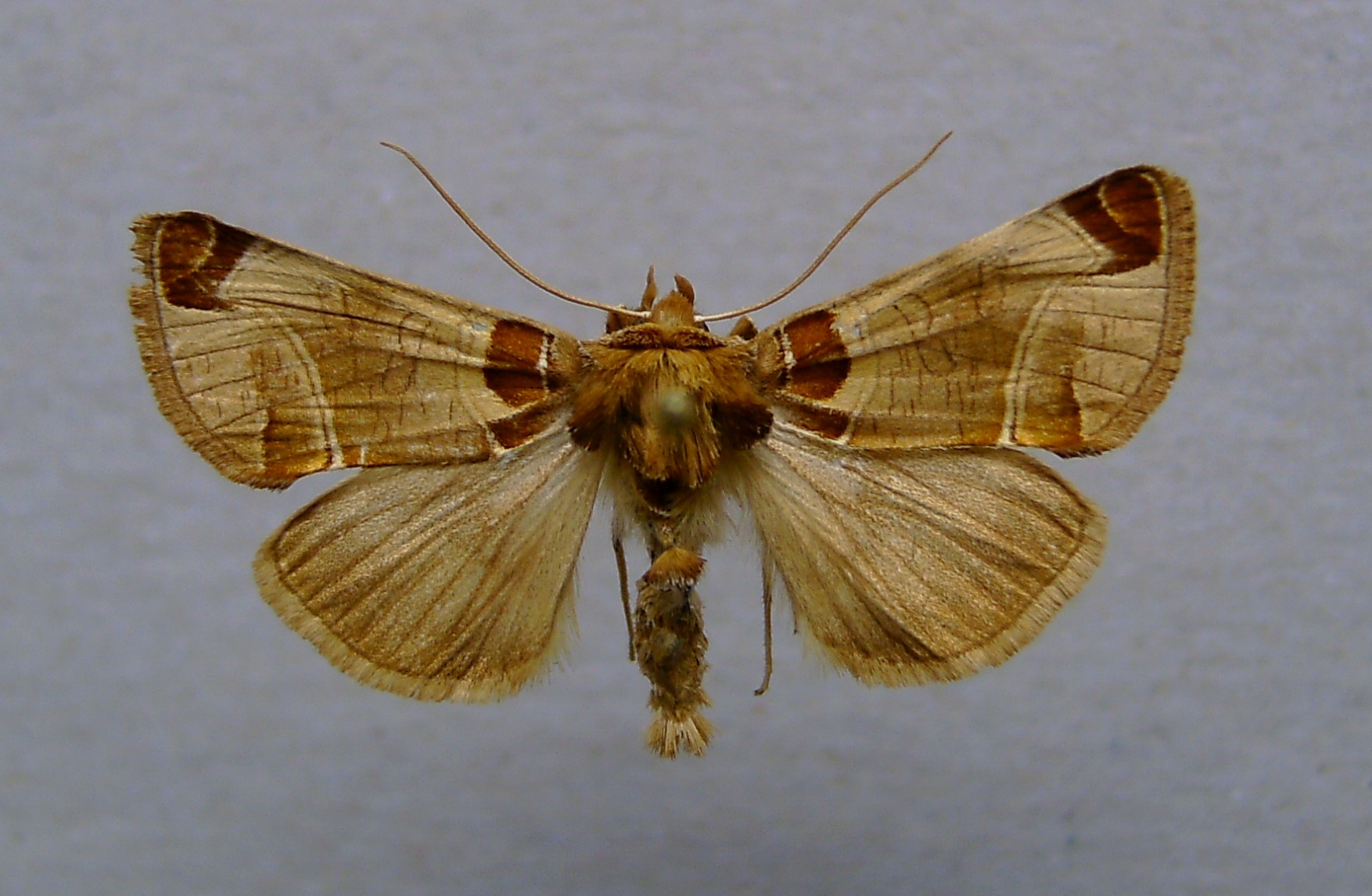
Plusidia cheiranthi

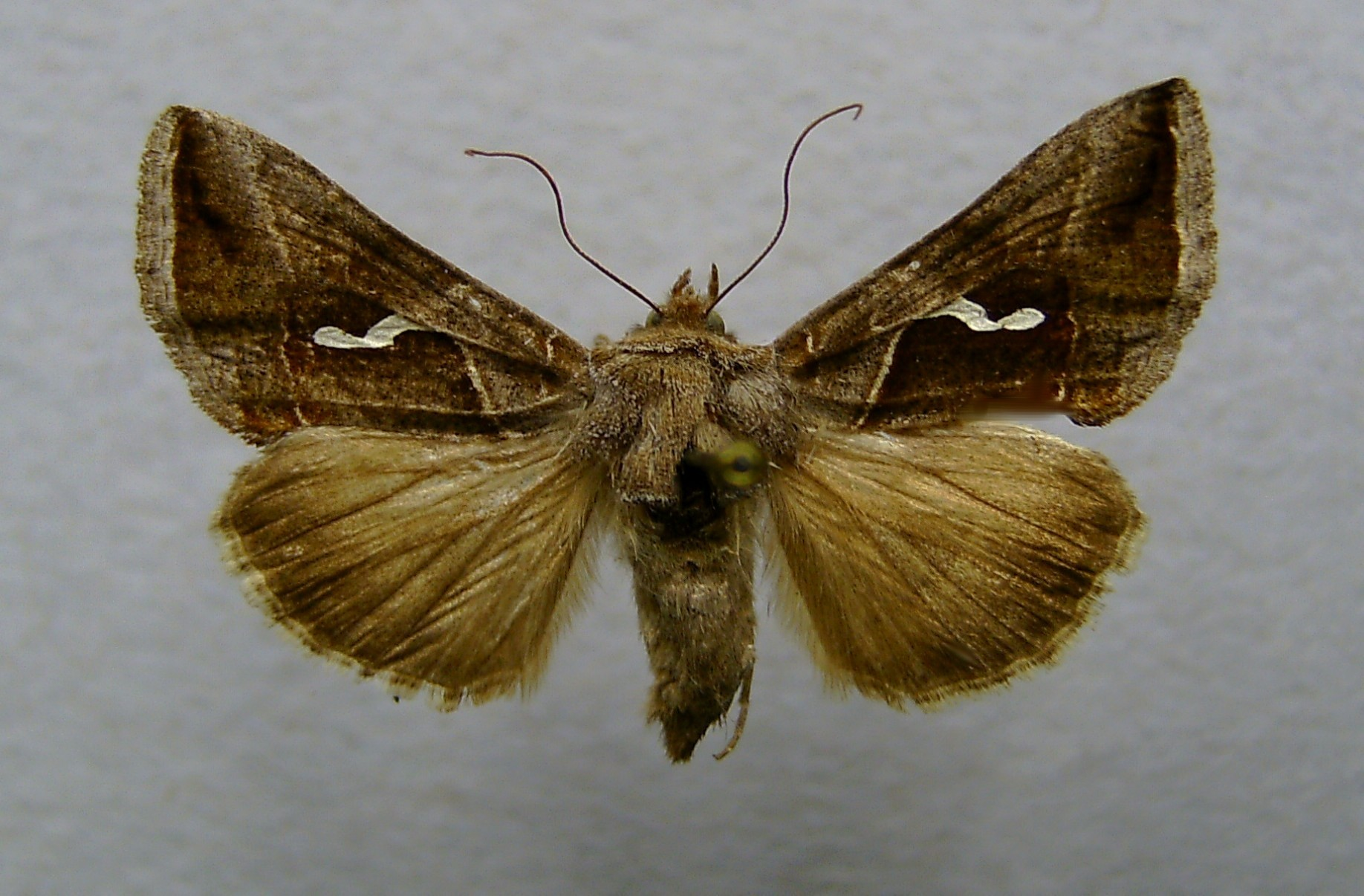
Macdunnoughia confusa

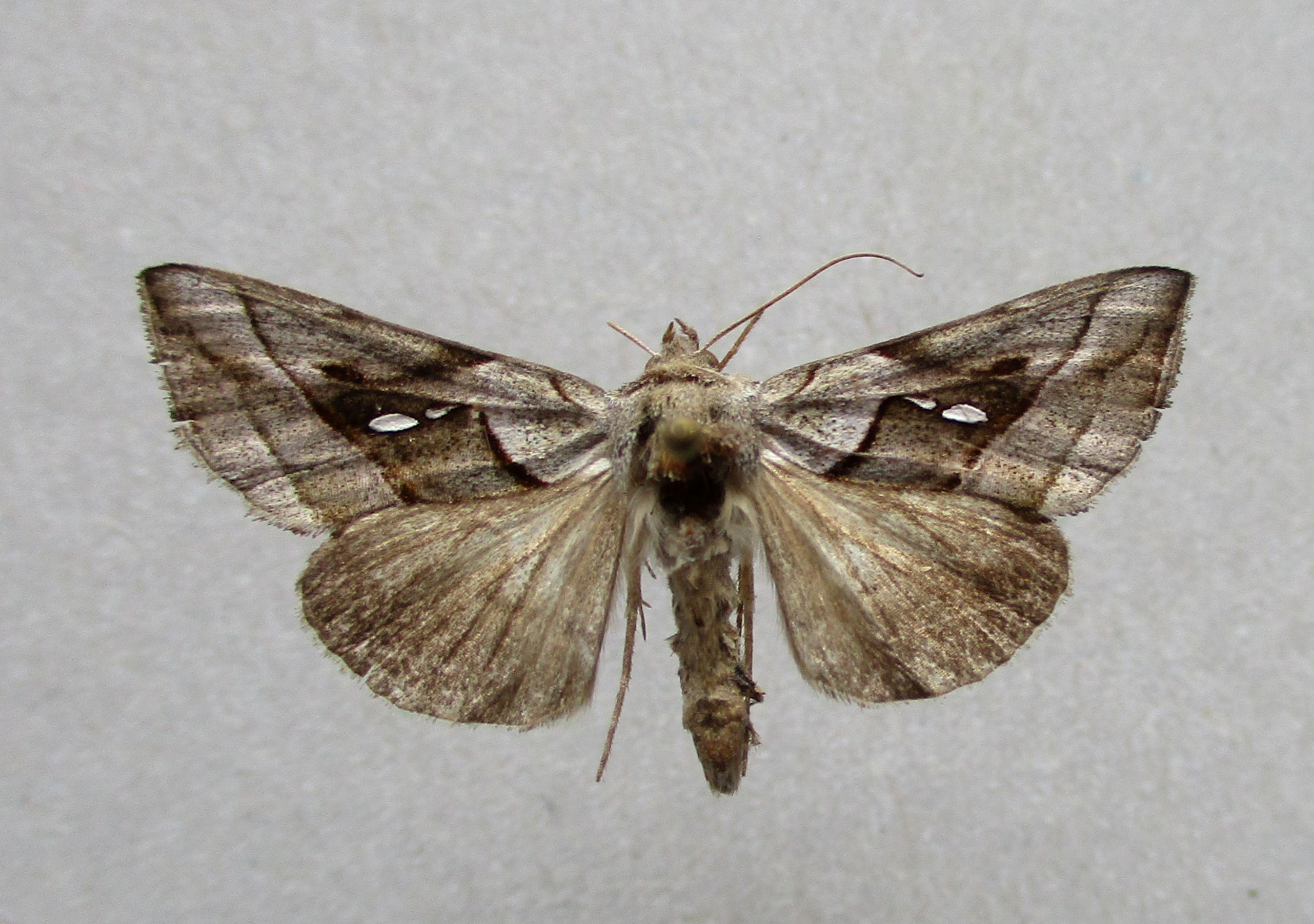
Macdunnoughia purissima

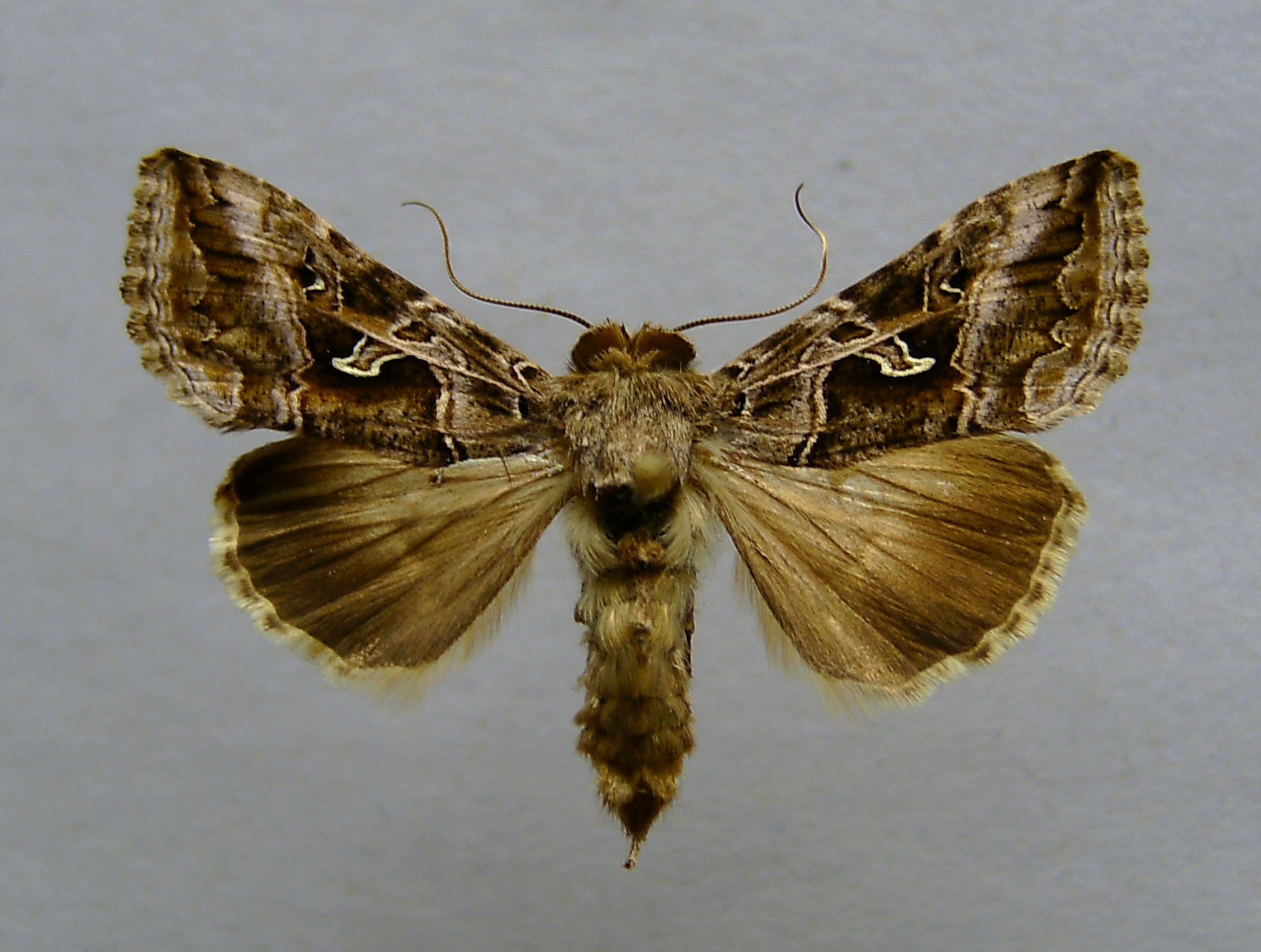
Cornutiplusia circumflexa

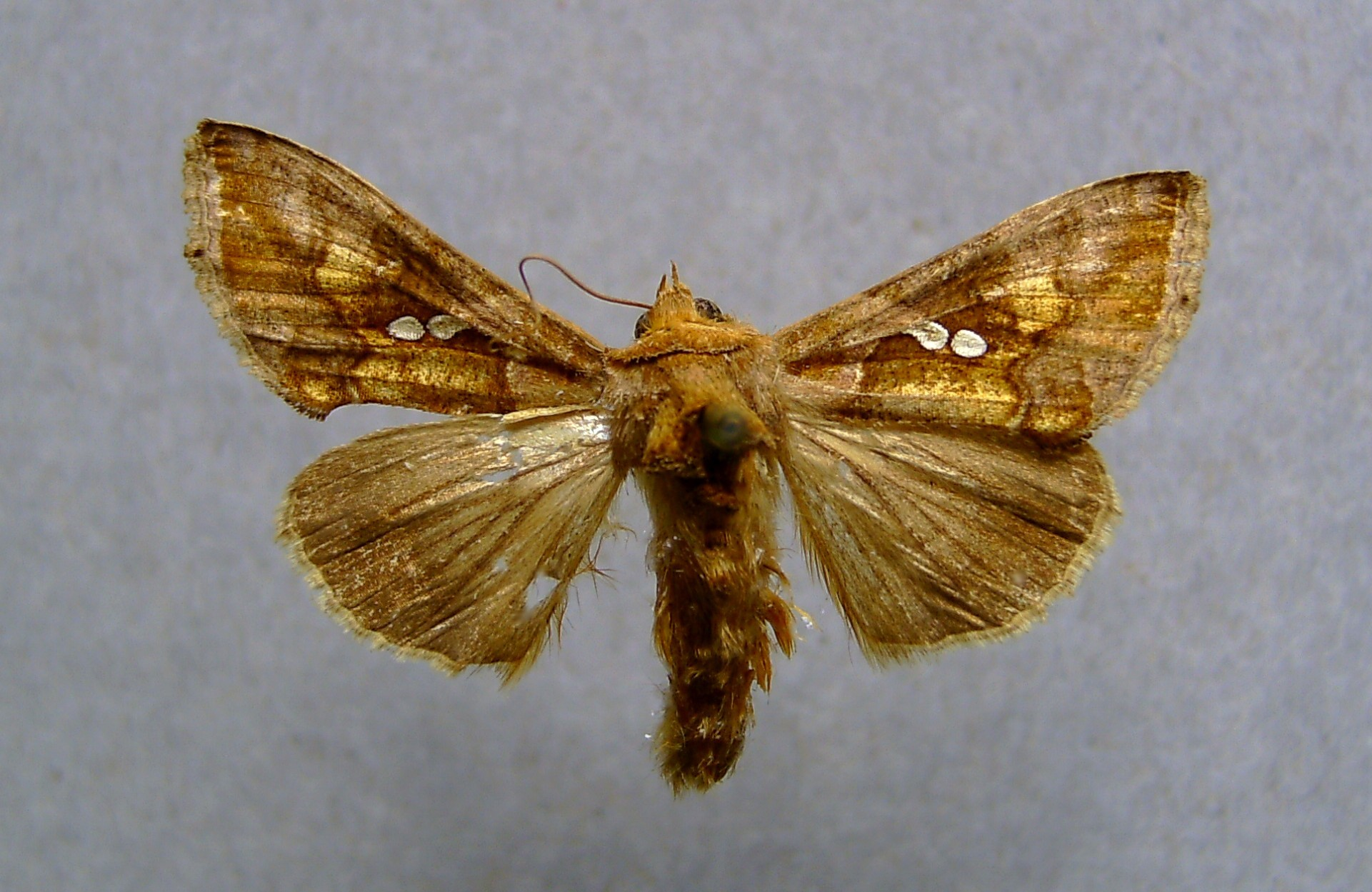
Chrysodeixis chalcites

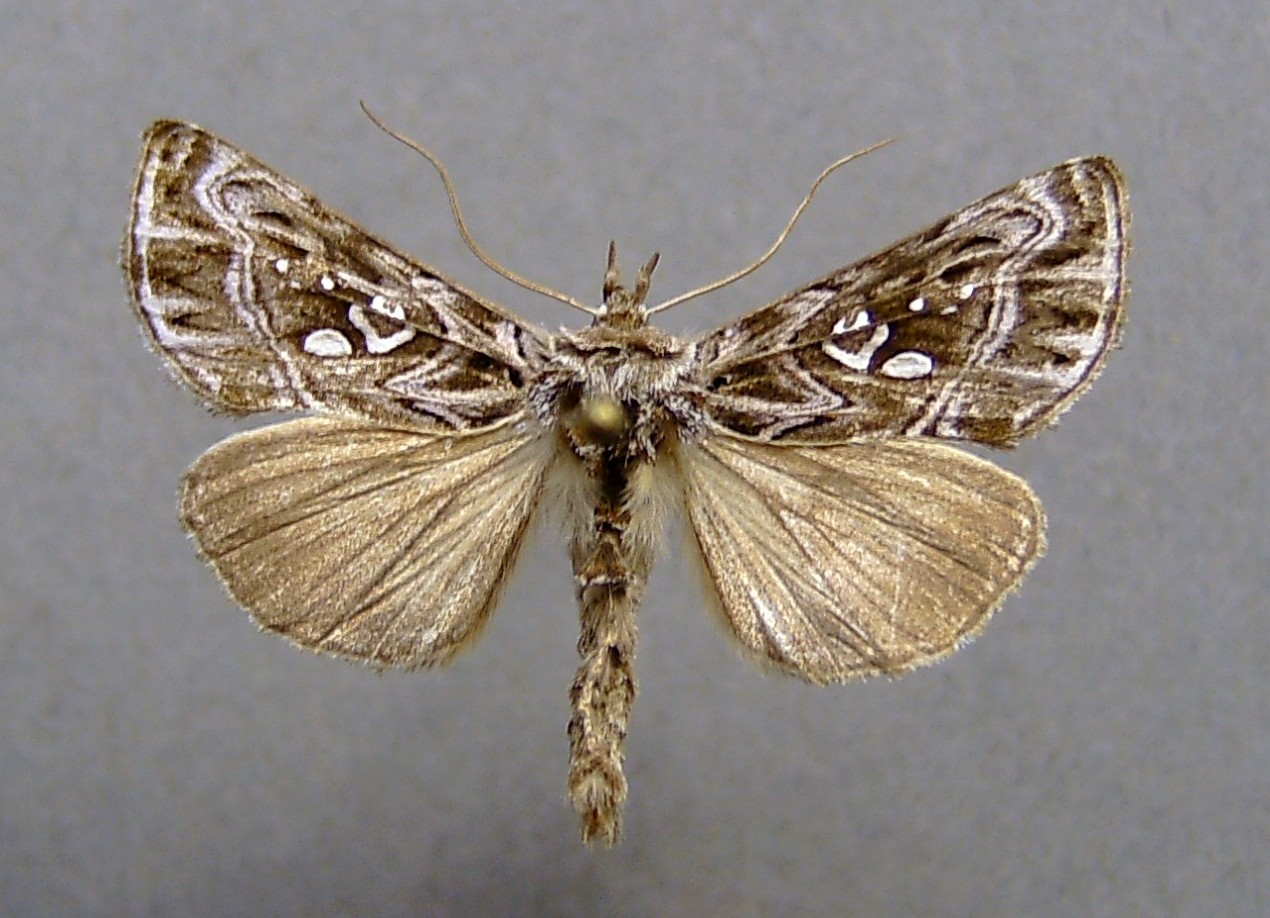
Panchrysia ornata

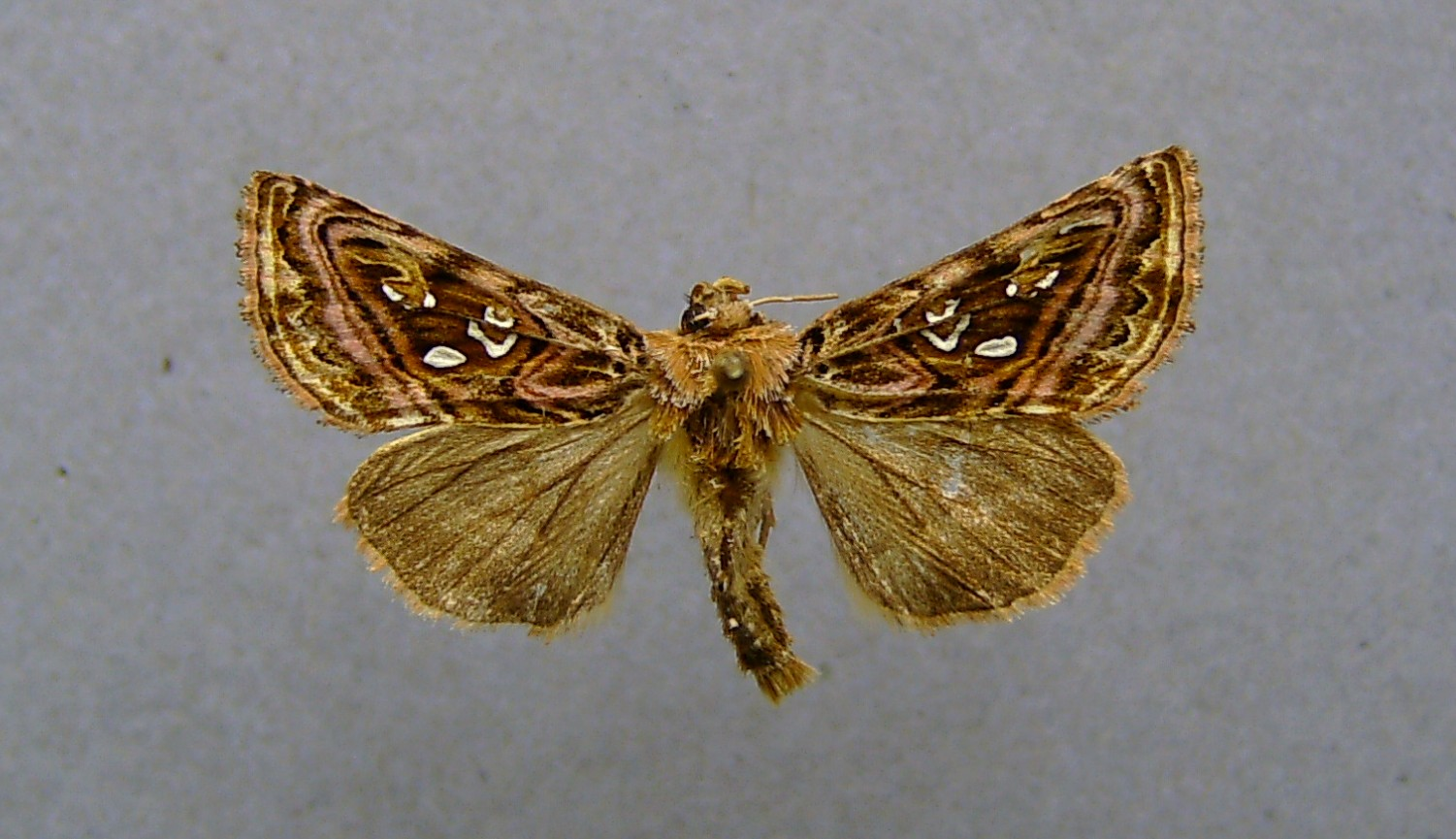
Panchrysia v-argenteum

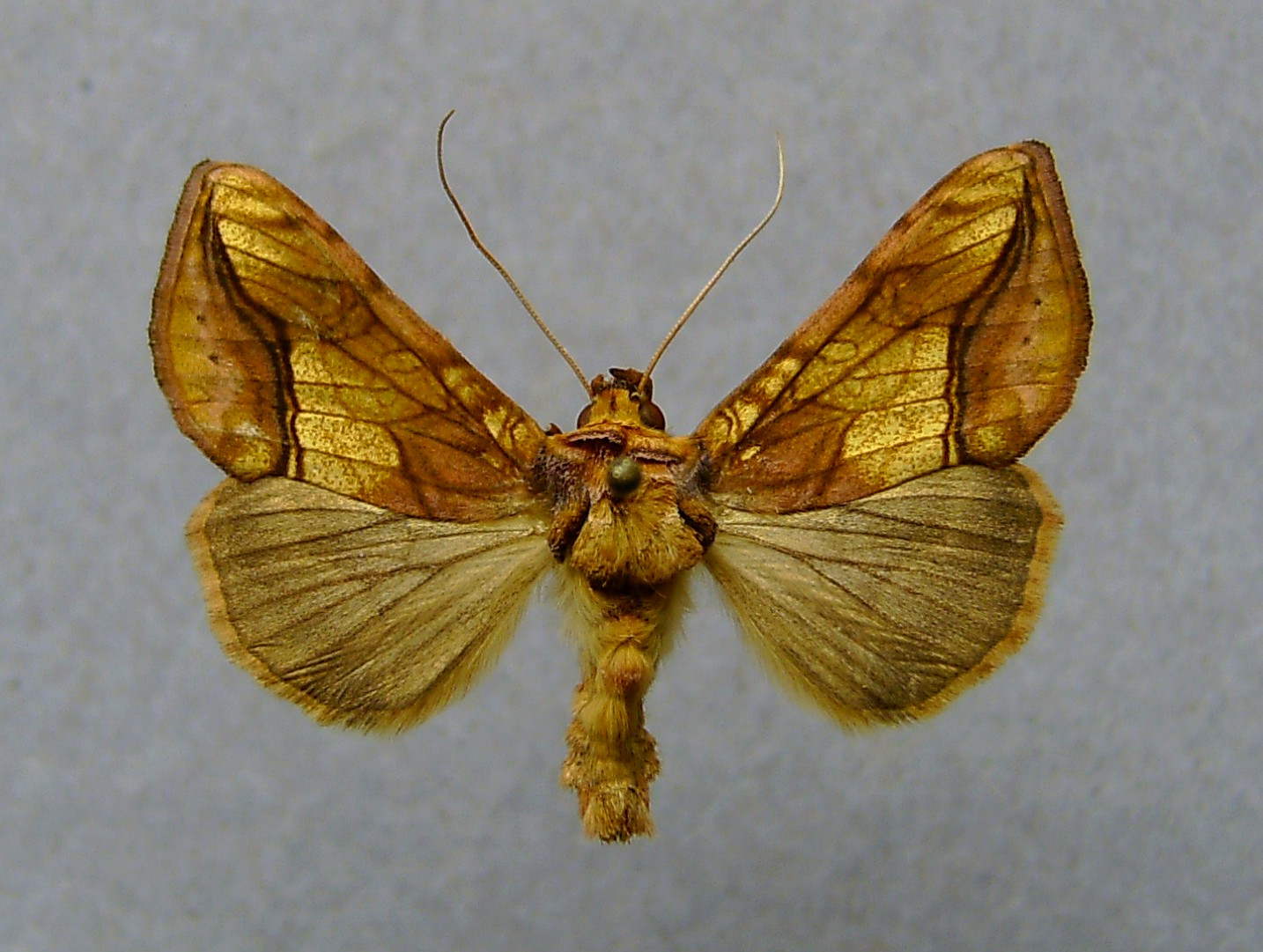
Panchrysia aurea

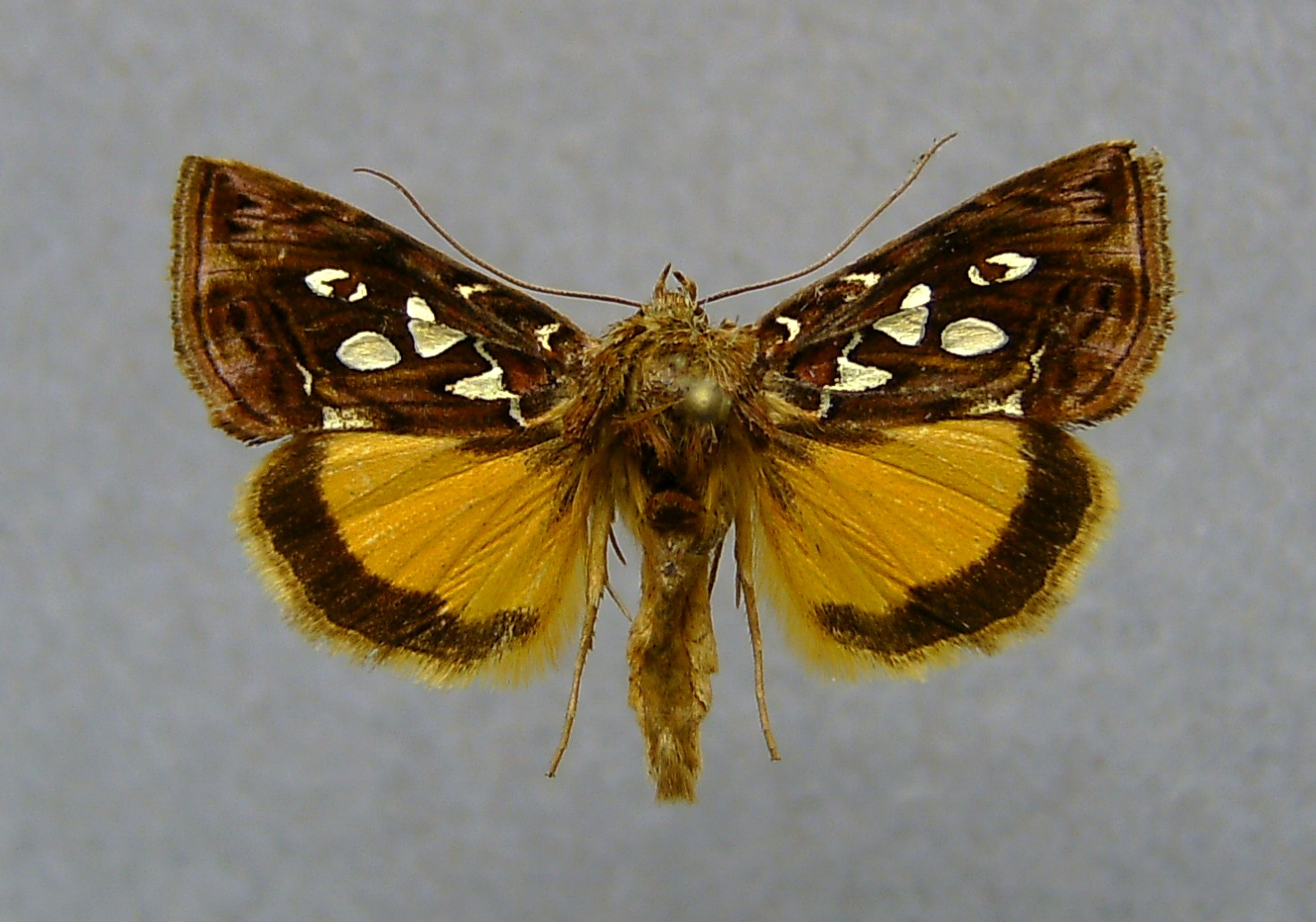
Panchrysia dives

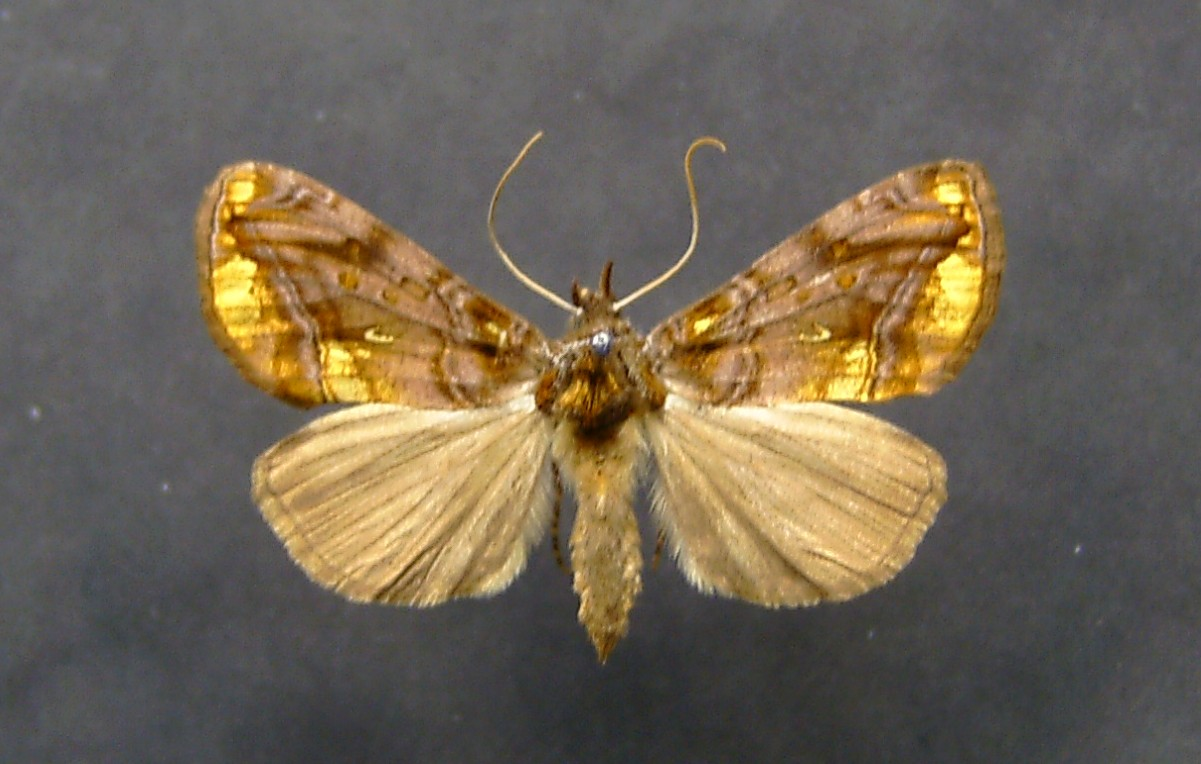
Lamprotes c-aureum

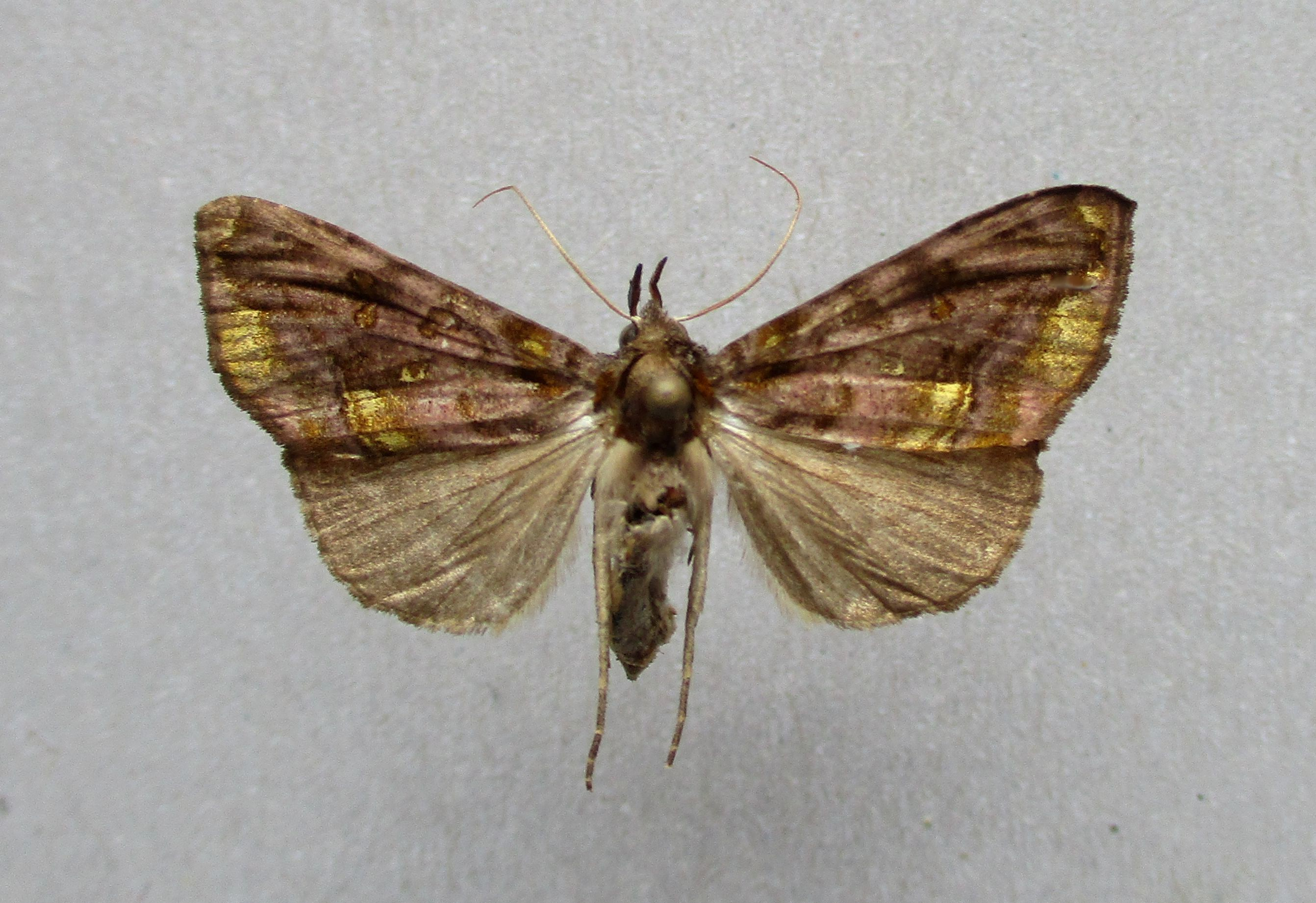
Lamprotes mikadina

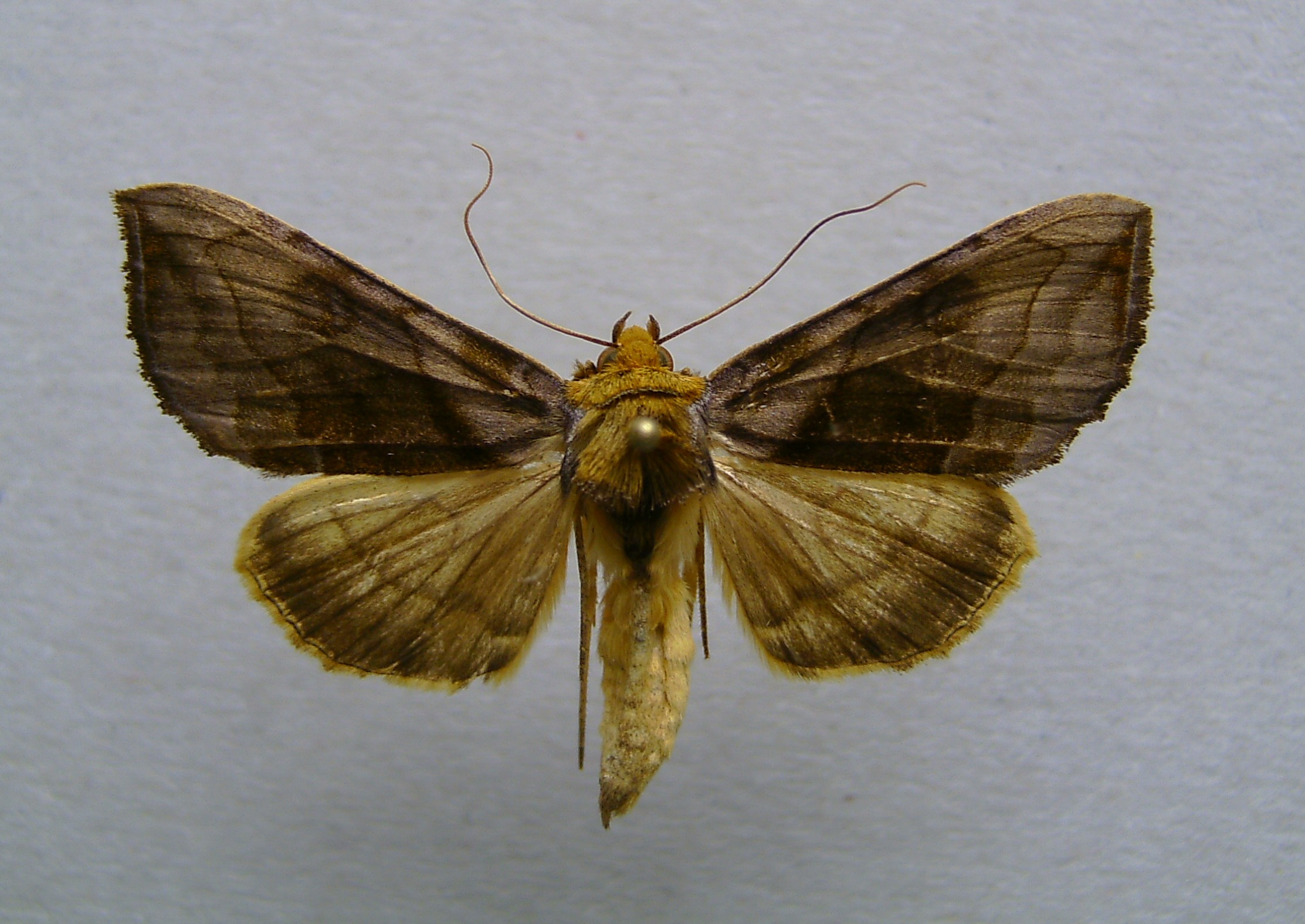
Diachrysia leonina

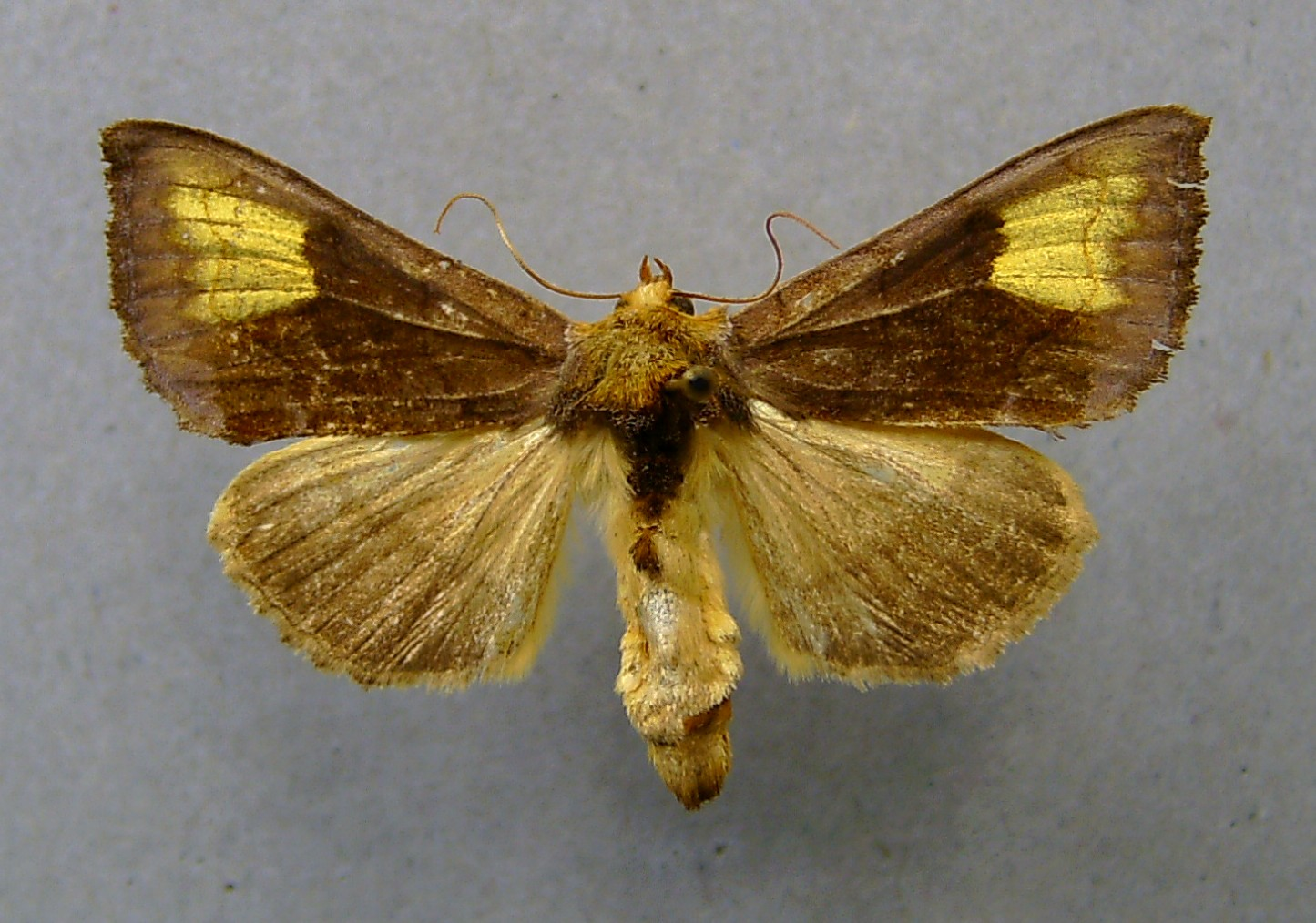
Diachrysia chryson

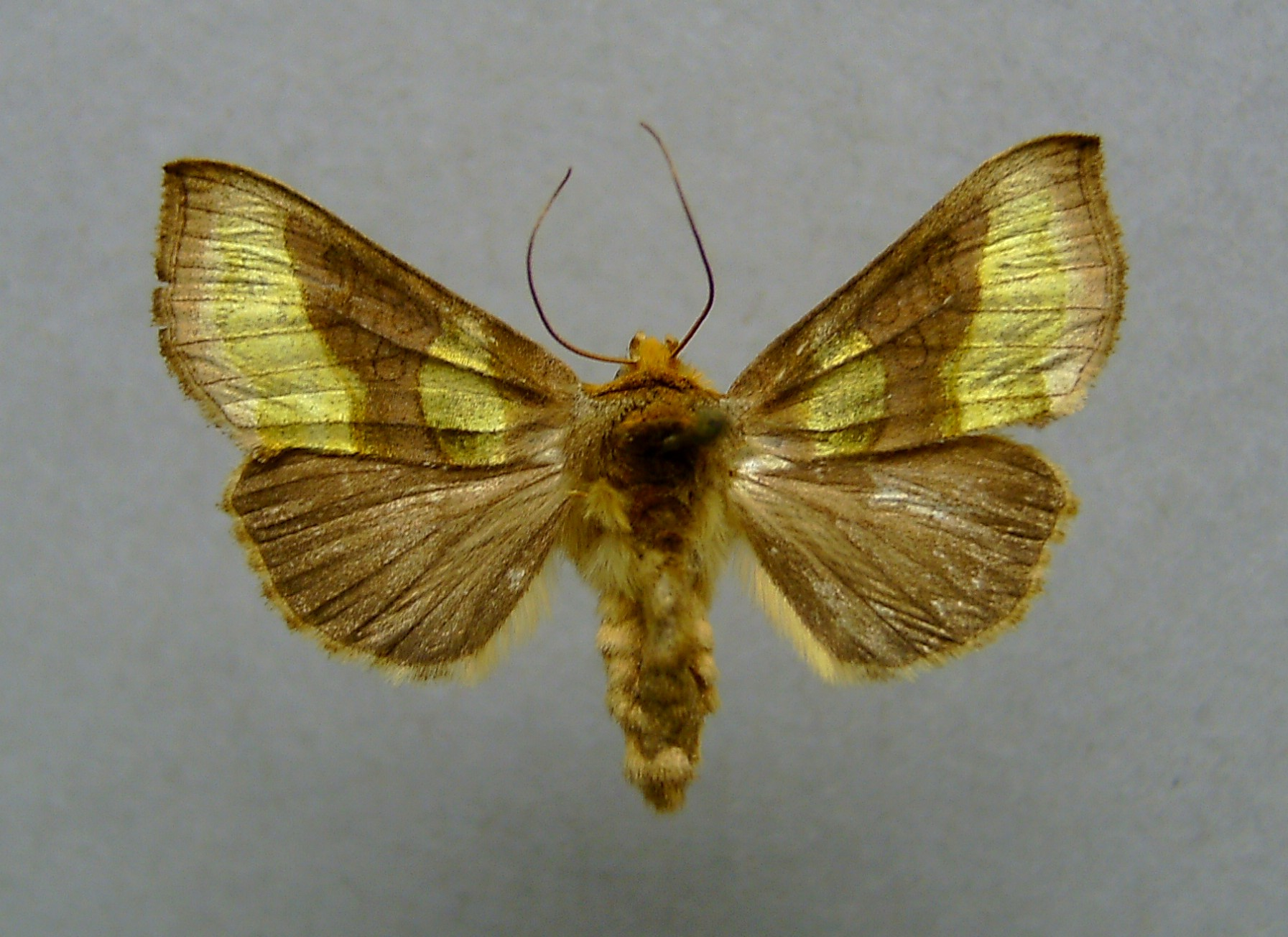
Diachrysia chrysitis

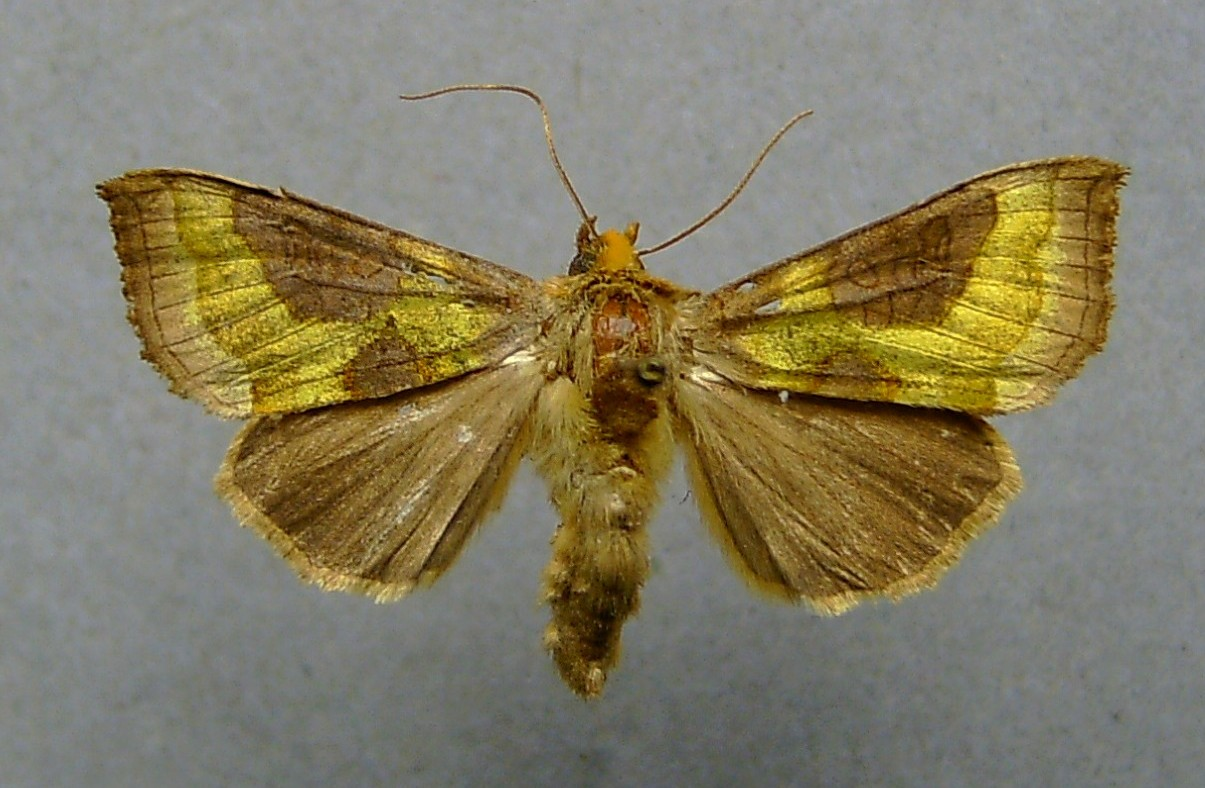
Diachrysia stenochrysis

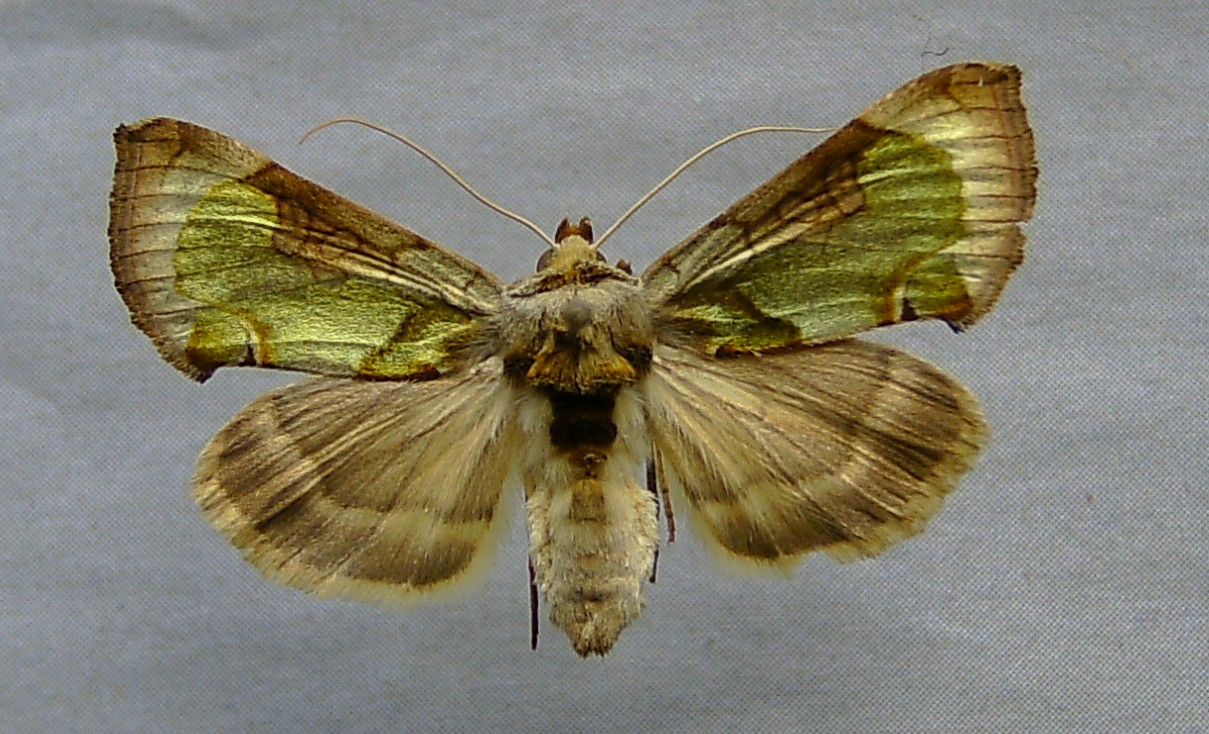
Diachrysia zosimi

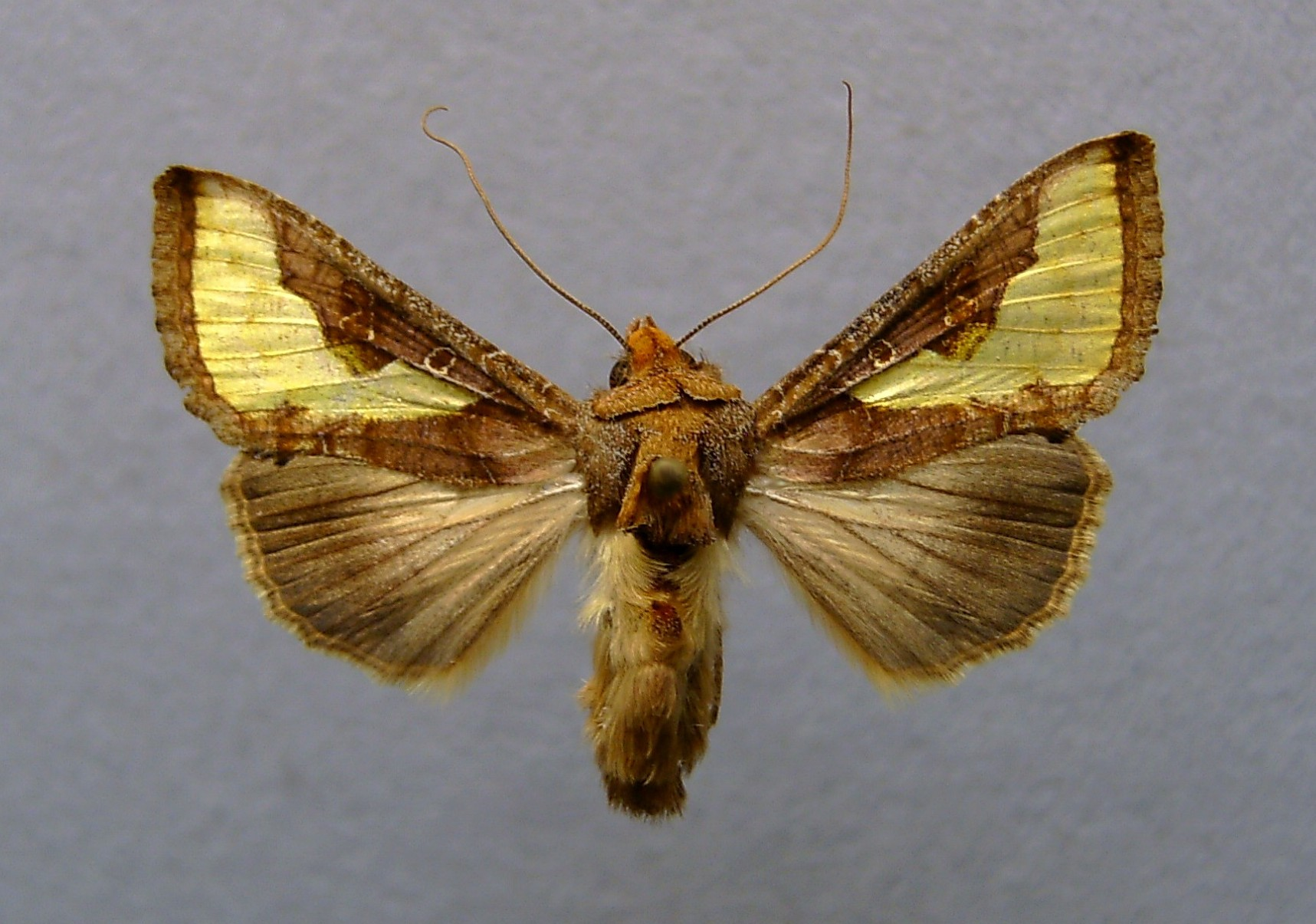
Thysanoplusia orichalcea

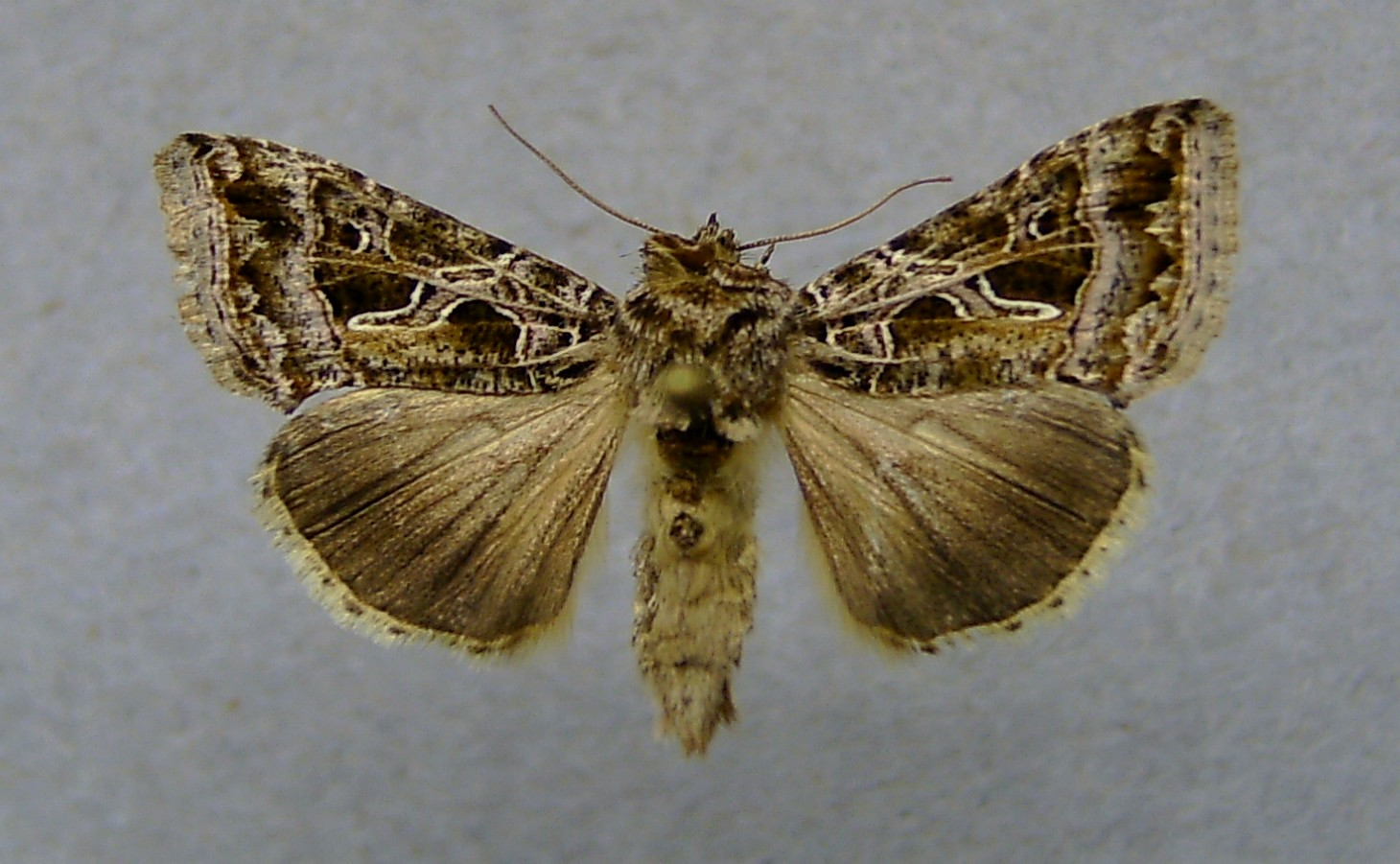
Thysanoplusia daubei

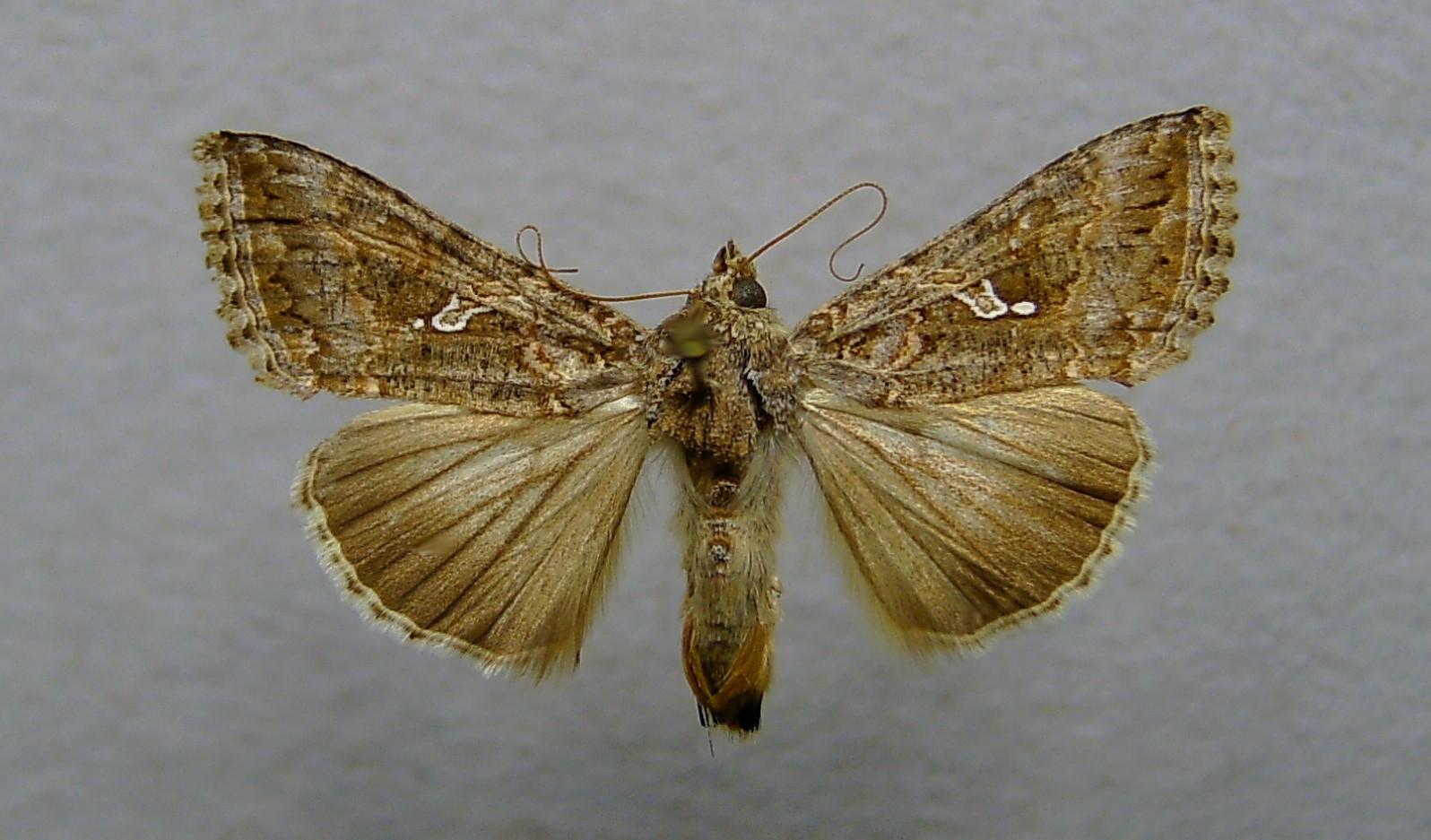
Trichoplusia ni
