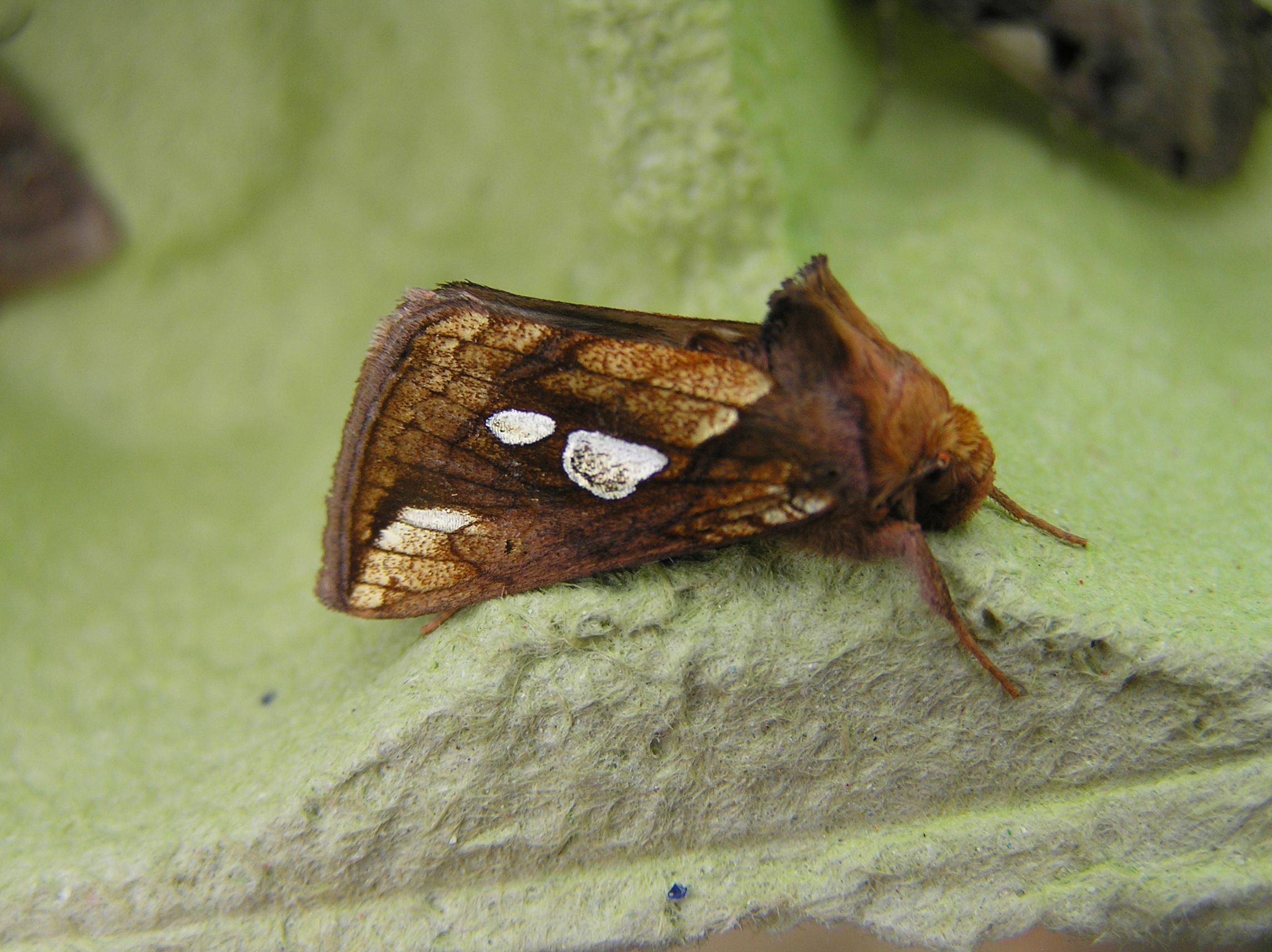
- Plusia festucae

Scientific classification
- Domain: Eukaryota
- Kingdom: Animalia
- Phylum: Arthropoda
- Class: Insecta
- Order: Lepidoptera
- Superfamily: Noctuoidea
- Family: Noctuidae
- Subfamily: Plusiinae
- Tribe: Plusiini

Genera
- About 40; see text

= Plusiini =

Tribe of moths

The Plusiini are the largest tribe of moths in the Plusiinae subfamily. At least one undescribed genus is known to exist.

== Genera ==
Subtribe Autoplusiina Kitching, 1987

- Erythroplusia
- Macdunnoughia
- Sclerogenia
- Antoculeora
- Loboplusia
- Autoplusia
- Notioplusia
- Rachiplusia
- Diachrysia
- Allagrapha

Subtribe Euchalciina Chou & Lu, 1979

- Euchalcia
- Desertoplusia
- Pseudochalcia
- Polychrysia
- Chrysanympha
- Eosphoropteryx
- Panchrysia
- Pseudeva
- Lamprotes
- Plusidia

Subtribe Exyrina (disputed)

- Exyra

Subtribe Plusiina Boisduval 1829

- Autographa
- Megalographa
- Lophoplusia
- Cornutiplusia
- Syngrapha
- Anagrapha
- Plusia
