= Euchalcia albavitta =

Scientific classification
- Domain: Eukaryota
- Kingdom: Animalia
- Phylum: Arthropoda
- Class: Insecta
- Order: Lepidoptera
- Superfamily: Noctuoidea
- Family: Noctuidae
- Tribe: Plusiini
- Subtribe: Euchalciina
- Genus: Euchalcia
- Species: E. albavitta

Binomial name
- Euchalcia albavitta (Ottolengui, 1902)

Species of moth

Euchalcia albavitta is a species of looper moth in the family Noctuidae. It is found in North America.

The MONA or Hodges number for Euchalcia albavitta is 8903.
