= Autoplusia olivacea =

Scientific classification
- Domain: Eukaryota
- Kingdom: Animalia
- Phylum: Arthropoda
- Class: Insecta
- Order: Lepidoptera
- Superfamily: Noctuoidea
- Family: Noctuidae
- Tribe: Plusiini
- Subtribe: Autoplusiina
- Genus: Autoplusia
- Species: A. olivacea

Binomial name
- Autoplusia olivacea (Skinner, 1917)

Species of moth

Autoplusia olivacea is a species of looper moth in the family Noctuidae. It is found in North America.

The MONA or Hodges number for Autoplusia olivacea is 8892.
