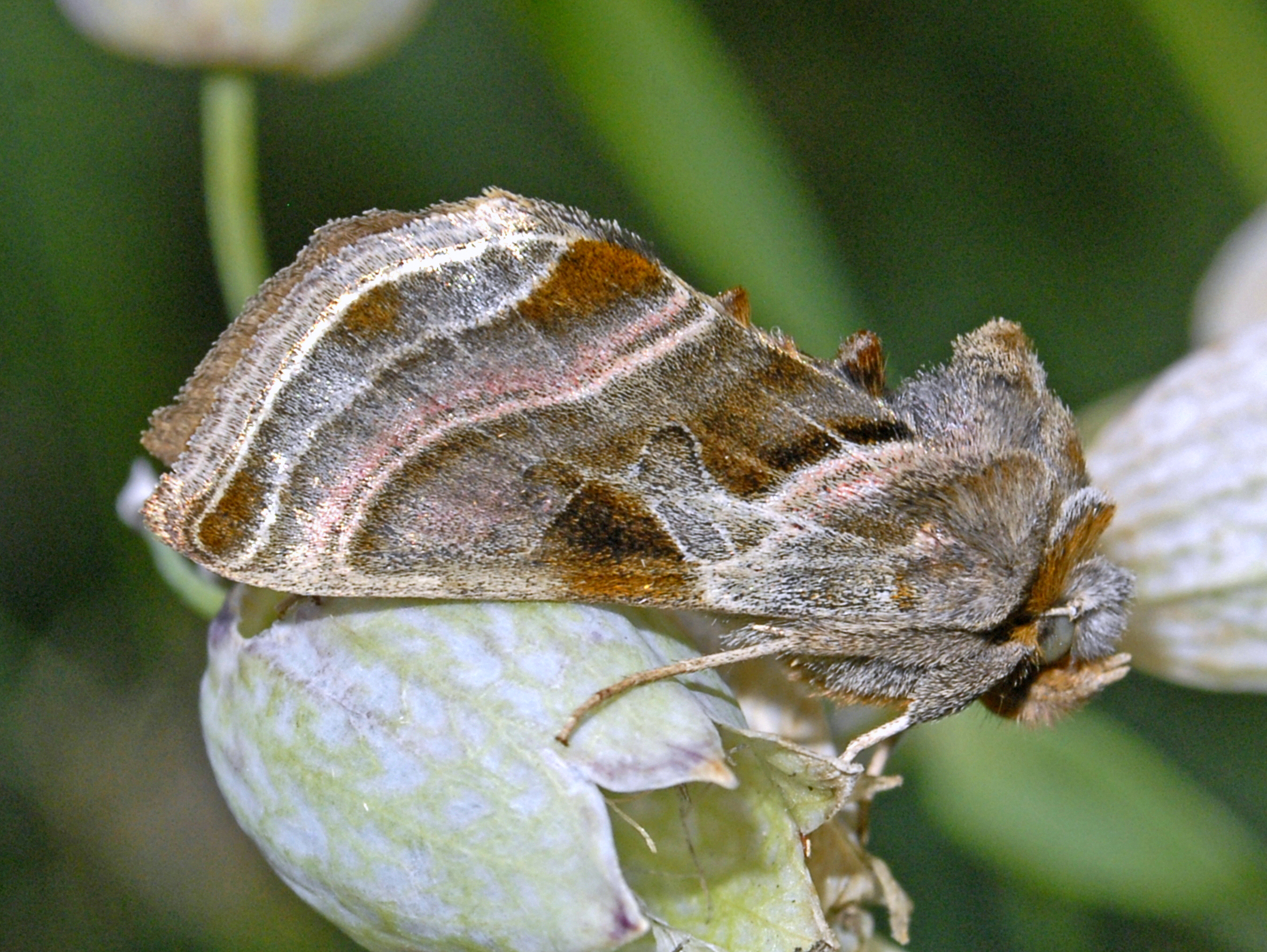
- Euchalcia variabilis

Scientific classification
- Kingdom: Animalia
- Phylum: Arthropoda
- Clade: Pancrustacea
- Class: Insecta
- Order: Lepidoptera
- Superfamily: Noctuoidea
- Family: Noctuidae
- Subfamily: Plusiinae
- Tribe: Plusiini
- Subtribe: Euchalciina
- Genus: Euchalcia; Hübner, [1821]

= Euchalcia =

Genus of moths

Euchalcia is a genus of moths of the family Noctuidae.

== Species ==
- Euchalcia albavitta (Ottolengui, 1902)
- Euchalcia altaica Dufay, 1968
- Euchalcia annemaria de Freina & Hacker, 1985
- Euchalcia armeniae Dufay, 1965
- Euchalcia augusta (Staudinger, 1891)
- Euchalcia aureolineata Gyulai & Ronkay, 1997
- Euchalcia bactrianae Dufay, 1968
- Euchalcia bea Hreblay & Ronkay, 1998
- Euchalcia bellieri (Kirby, 1900)
- Euchalcia biezankoi (Alberti, 1965)
- Euchalcia borealis Lafontain & Poole, 1991
- Euchalcia caeletissima Hreblay & Ronkay, 1998
- Euchalcia cashmirensis Moore, 1881
- Euchalcia chalcophanes Dufay, 1963
- Euchalcia chlorocharis (Dufay, 1961)
- Euchalcia consona (Fabricius, 1787)
- Euchalcia cuprescens Dufay, 1965
- Euchalcia defreinai Hacker, 1986
- Euchalcia dorsiflava (Standfuss, 1892)
- Euchalcia emichi (Rogenhofer, 1873)
- Euchalcia exornata Ronkay, 1987
- Euchalcia gerda (Püngeler, 1907)
- Euchalcia hedeia Dufay, 1978
- Euchalcia herrichi (Staudinger, 1861)
- Euchalcia hissarica Klyucho, 1983
- Euchalcia hyrcaniae Dufay, 1963
- Euchalcia italica (Staudinger, 1882)
- Euchalcia kautti Hacker & Ronkay, 1992
- Euchalcia kitchingi Hacker & Ronkay, 1992
- Euchalcia kondarensis Klyucho, 1989
- Euchalcia maria (Staudinger, 1891)
- Euchalcia modestoides Poole, 1989
- Euchalcia nepalina Hreblay & Plante, 1995
- Euchalcia orophasma (Boursin, 1960)
- Euchalcia paulina (Staudinger, 1891)
- Euchalcia renardi (Eversmann, 1844)
- Euchalcia sergia (Oberthür, 1884)
- Euchalcia serraticornis Dufay, 1965
- Euchalcia siderifera (Eversmann, 1856)
- Euchalcia stilpna Dufay, 1969
- Euchalcia taurica (Osthelder, 1933)
- Euchalcia variabilis – purple-shaded gem (Piller & Mitterpacher, 1783)
- Euchalcia viridis (Staudinger, 1901)
- Euchalcia xanthoides Dufay, 1968
