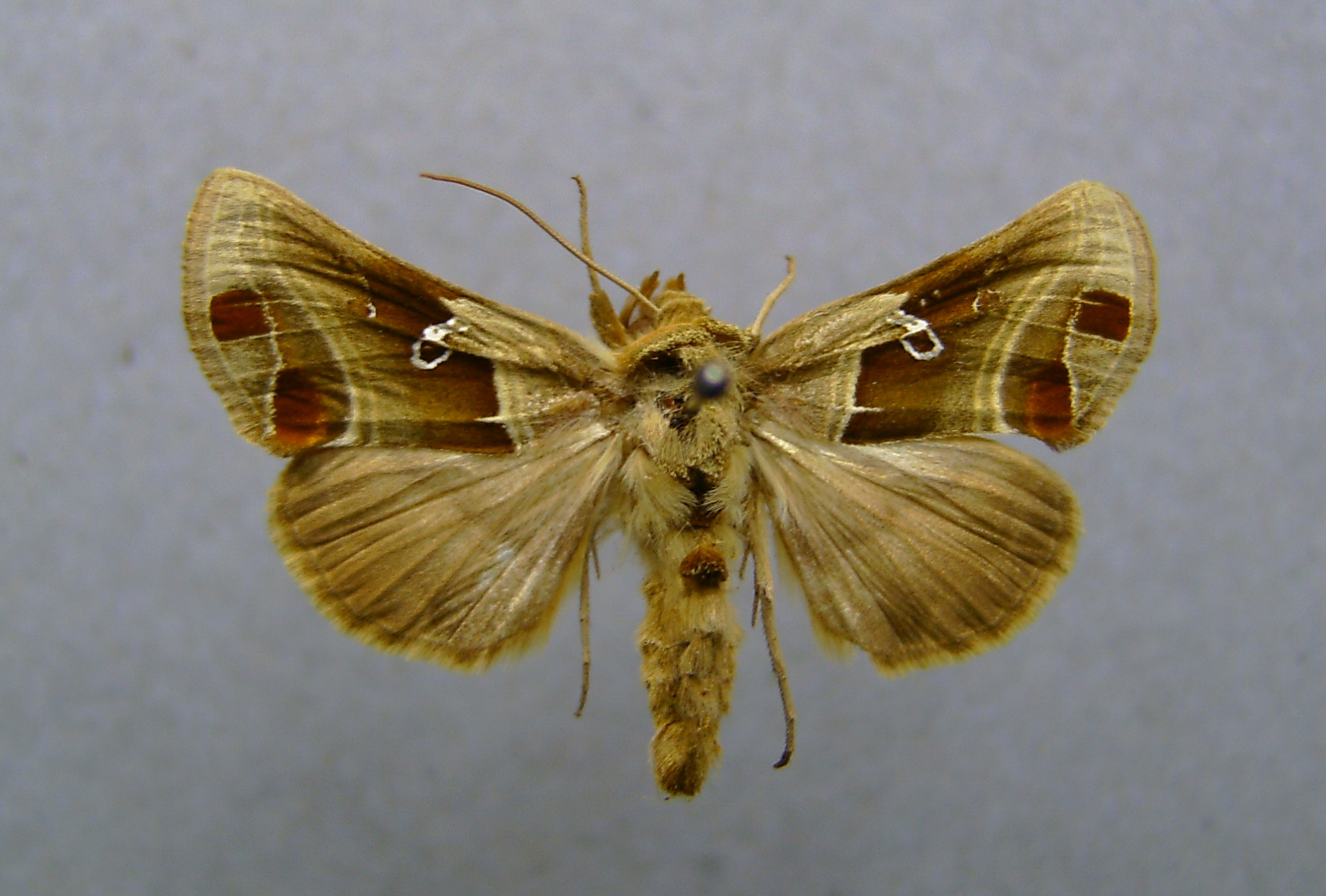

Scientific classification
- Kingdom: Animalia
- Phylum: Arthropoda
- Class: Insecta
- Order: Lepidoptera
- Superfamily: Noctuoidea
- Family: Noctuidae
- Genus: Euchalcia
- Species: E. consona

Binomial name
- Euchalcia consona Fabricius, 1787

Synonyms
- Plusia consona; Noctua consona; Phytometra consona

= Euchalcia consona =

Species of moth

Euchalcia consona is a moth of the family Noctuidae. It is found in Europe from Austria, through Hungary and Siberia up to the Ural Mountains.

The wingspan is 30–36 mm. The moth flies from May to June and again from August to September in two generations depending on the location.

The larvae feed on Nonea pulla, Anchusa arvensis and Pulmonaria species.
