= Euchalcia aureolineata =

Scientific classification
- Domain: Eukaryota
- Kingdom: Animalia
- Phylum: Arthropoda
- Class: Insecta
- Order: Lepidoptera
- Superfamily: Noctuoidea
- Family: Noctuidae
- Genus: Euchalcia
- Species: E. aureolineata

Binomial name
- Euchalcia aureolineata Ronkay & Gyulai, 1997

Species of moth

Euchalcia aureolineata is a moth of the family Noctuidae. It has been recorded from Syria and Israel.

Adults are on wing in April. There is one generation per year.
