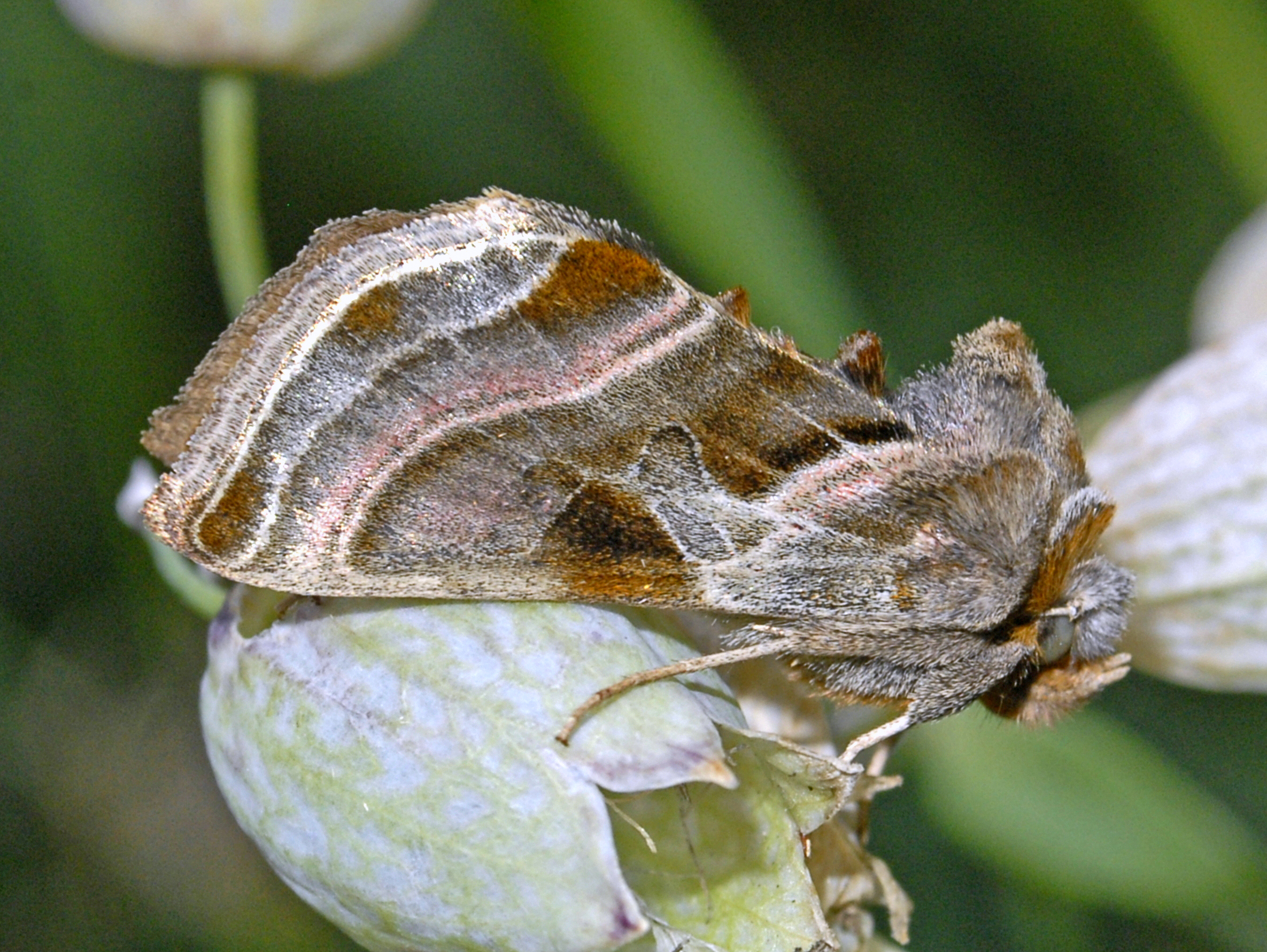
- Adult of Euchalcia variabilis

Scientific classification
- Kingdom: Animalia
- Phylum: Arthropoda
- Clade: Pancrustacea
- Class: Insecta
- Order: Lepidoptera
- Superfamily: Noctuoidea
- Family: Noctuidae
- Genus: Euchalcia
- Species: E. variabilis

Binomial name
- Euchalcia variabilis (Piller & Mitterpacher, 1783)

Synonyms
- Phytometra variabilis; Plusia variabilis; Noctua illustris; Fabricius, 1787

= Euchalcia variabilis =

Purple-shaded gem

Species of moth

Euchalcia variabilis, the purple-shaded gem, is a moth of the family Noctuidae.

== Description ==
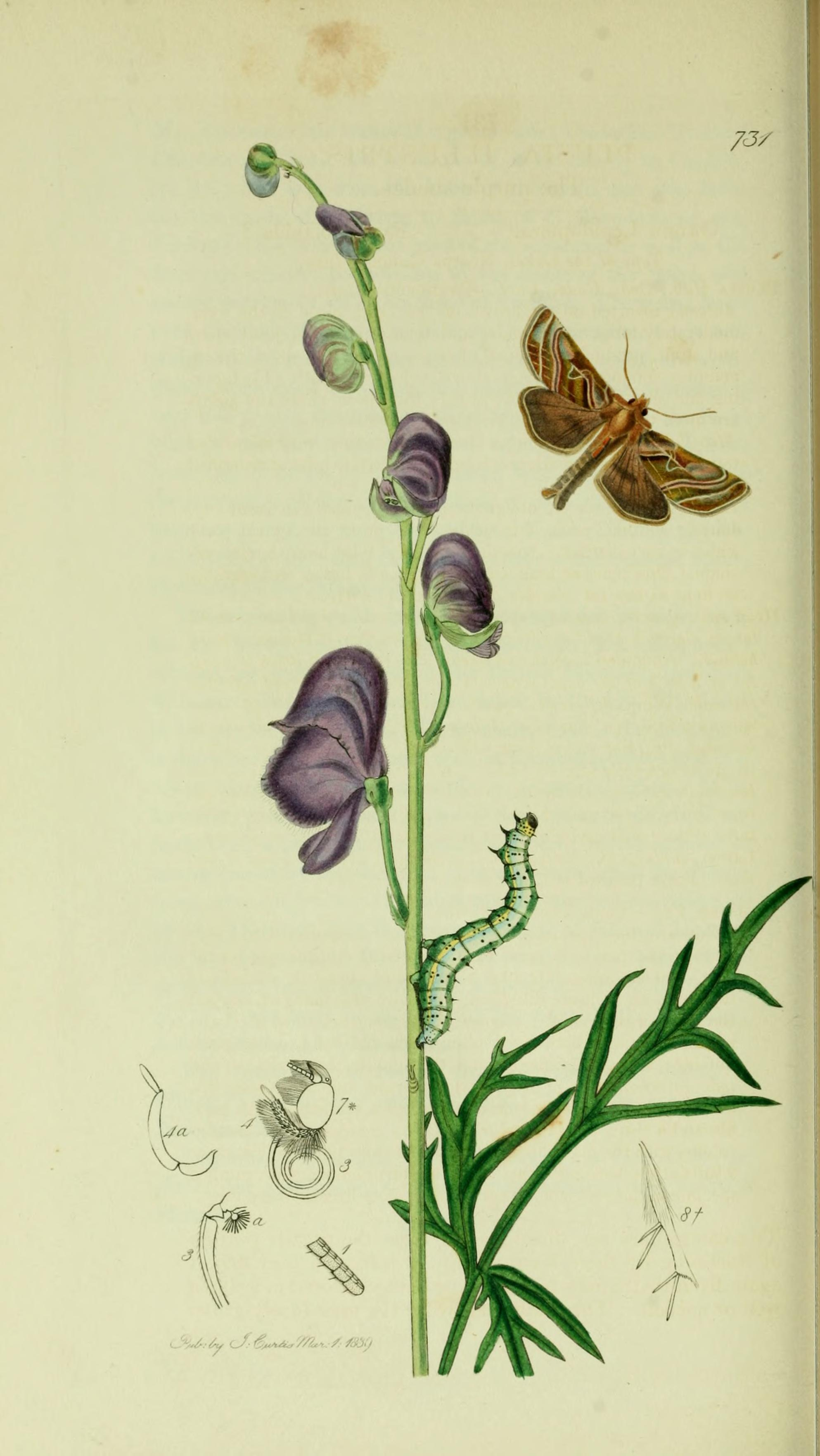
Illustration from British Entomology

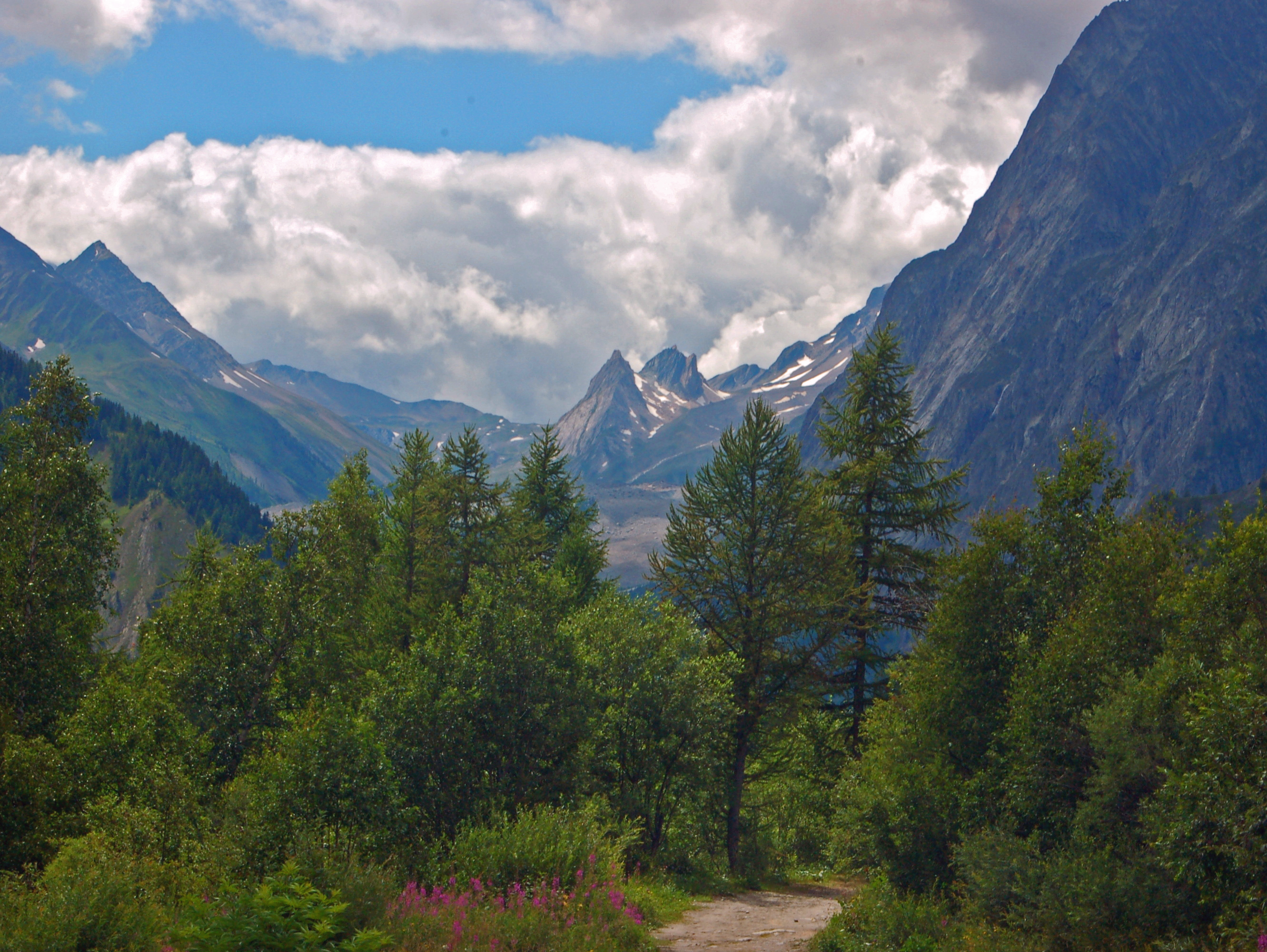
Habitat of E. variabilis, Val Ferret, Valle d'Aosta, abt. 2400 m. a.s.l.

The wingspan is 34–42 mm. The upperside of the forewings is varied with rosy in the basal area. Also, the transversal lines are bordered with rosy. The central area is dark brown. The dark basal line is slightly curved or almost straight. The larvae are green with a black head, numerous blackish dots, a dark stripe on the back, and a yellow lateral line. This species closely resembles Euchalcia bellieri, but it is quite larger. The moth flies from June to August depending on the location.

The larvae feed from May to July on larkspur (Delphinium species), meadow-rue (Thalictrum species) and monkshood (Aconitum species).

== Distribution and habitat ==
This species is found in woodlands, glades, and mountain forests of Central and Southern Europe through the Southern Ural Mountains north to Mongolia.
