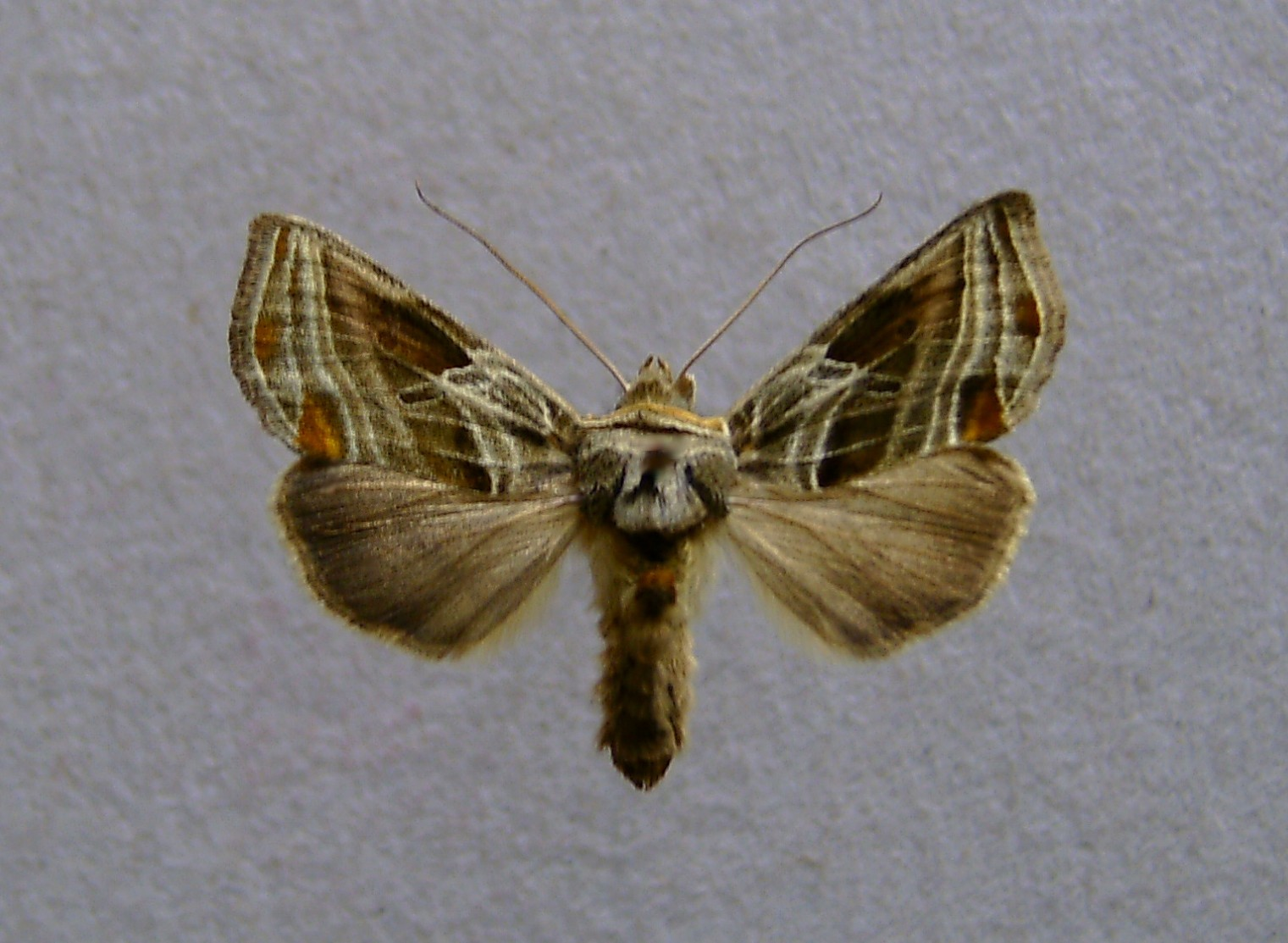

Scientific classification
- Kingdom: Animalia
- Phylum: Arthropoda
- Class: Insecta
- Order: Lepidoptera
- Superfamily: Noctuoidea
- Family: Noctuidae
- Genus: Euchalcia
- Species: E. modestoides

Binomial name
- Euchalcia modestoides Poole, 1989

Synonyms
- Euchalcia modesta

= Euchalcia modestoides =

Species of moth

Euchalcia modestoides is a moth of the family Noctuidae. It is found from the temperate areas of central Europe, east to Japan.

The wingspan is 28–38 mm (1.1–1.5 in). Adults are on wing from June to July.

The larvae feed on Pulmonaria species and Cynoglossum officinale.
