= Megalographa talamanca =

Scientific classification
- Domain: Eukaryota
- Kingdom: Animalia
- Phylum: Arthropoda
- Class: Insecta
- Order: Lepidoptera
- Superfamily: Noctuoidea
- Family: Noctuidae
- Genus: Megalographa
- Species: M. talamanca

Binomial name
- Megalographa talamanca Lafontaine and Sullivan, 2009

Species of moth

Megalographa talamanca is a moth of the family Noctuidae. It is known only from the Talamanca Mountain Range of central Costa Rica where it has been collected at elevations above 3,100 meters in oak dominated cloud forests.
