= Megalographa agualaniata =

Scientific classification
- Domain: Eukaryota
- Kingdom: Animalia
- Phylum: Arthropoda
- Class: Insecta
- Order: Lepidoptera
- Superfamily: Noctuoidea
- Family: Noctuidae
- Genus: Megalographa
- Species: M. agualaniata

Binomial name
- Megalographa agualaniata (Dognin, 1912)

Synonyms
- Plusia agualaniata Dognin, 1912

Species of moth

Megalographa agualaniata is a moth of the family Noctuidae. It is found in the montane areas of South America, from Venezuela and Colombia southward to Bolivia and Peru.
