= Pseudeva purpurigera =

Scientific classification
- Kingdom: Animalia
- Phylum: Arthropoda
- Class: Insecta
- Order: Lepidoptera
- Superfamily: Noctuoidea
- Family: Noctuidae
- Genus: Pseudeva
- Species: P. purpurigera

Binomial name
- Pseudeva purpurigera (Walker, 1858)

Synonyms
- Deva purpurigera Walker, 1858

Species of moth

Pseudeva purpurigera, the western straight-lined looper, is a moth of the family Noctuidae. The species was first described by Francis Walker in 1858. It is found in the Rocky Mountains from south-west Alberta to New Mexico and east to New England and Newfoundland.

The wingspan is 28–34 mm. Adults are on wing from July to August depending on the location. There is one generation per year.

The larvae feed on Thalictrum.
