= Notioplusia illustrata =

Scientific classification
- Kingdom: Animalia
- Phylum: Arthropoda
- Class: Insecta
- Order: Lepidoptera
- Superfamily: Noctuoidea
- Family: Noctuidae
- Genus: Notioplusia
- Species: N. illustrata

Binomial name
- Notioplusia illustrata (Guenée, 1852)

Synonyms
- Autoplusia illustrata (Guenée, 1852); Plusia egenella Herrich-Schäffer, 1868; Plusia abeona Druce, 1889; Plusia roxana Druce, 1894; Plusia illustrata Guenée, 1852

Species of moth

Notioplusia illustrata, the notioplusia moth, is a moth of the family Noctuidae first described by Achille Guenée in 1852. It is native to Saint Kitts, the Greater Antilles (Cuba, Jamaica, Haiti, Puerto Rico), Florida, Mexico, Panama and South America. It was introduced to Australia and South Africa.

The larvae feed on the leaves of Lantana camara.
