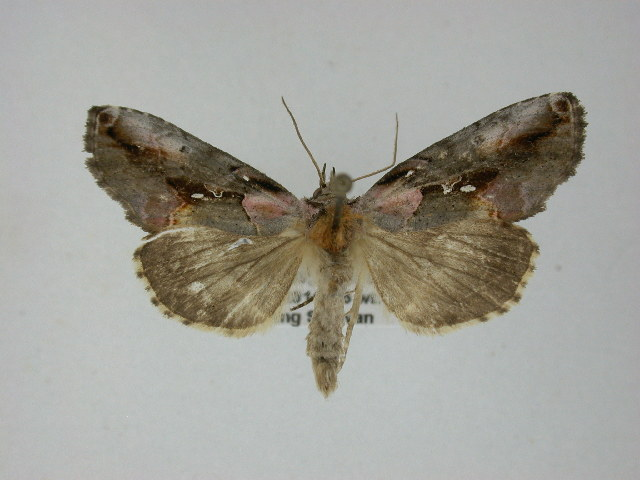

Scientific classification
- Kingdom: Animalia
- Phylum: Arthropoda
- Class: Insecta
- Order: Lepidoptera
- Superfamily: Noctuoidea
- Family: Noctuidae
- Genus: Eosphoropteryx
- Species: E. thyatyroides

Binomial name
- Eosphoropteryx thyatyroides (Guenée, 1852)

Synonyms
- Plusia thyatyroides Guenée, 1852

= Eosphoropteryx thyatyroides =

Species of moth

Eosphoropteryx thyatyroides, the pink-patched looper moth or pink-tinted beauty, is a moth of the family Noctuidae. The species was first described by Achille Guenée in 1852. In North America it is found from Nova Scotia and northern Ontario south to Minnesota, Michigan, Ohio and along the Appalachians from Maine to eastern Tennessee and western North Carolina; and to the west, it occurs from central Alberta and southern British Columbia, south in the Cascades to southern Oregon, and in the Rocky Mountains to northern Idaho.

The wingspan is 31–38 mm. Adults are on wing from July to August in Alberta and from June to early August and mid-October in the Great Smoky Mountains National Park.

The larvae feed on Thalictrum dioicum and Thalictrum polygamum.
