= Megalographa bonaerensis =

Scientific classification
- Domain: Eukaryota
- Kingdom: Animalia
- Phylum: Arthropoda
- Class: Insecta
- Order: Lepidoptera
- Superfamily: Noctuoidea
- Family: Noctuidae
- Genus: Megalographa
- Species: M. bonaerensis

Binomial name
- Megalographa bonaerensis (Berg, 1882)

Synonyms
- Plusia bonaerensis Berg, 1882; Autograha solida Ottolengui, 1902

Species of moth

Megalographa bonaerensis is a moth of the family Noctuidae. It is found from southern Brazil and Paraguay southward to northern Argentina and Chile.
