= Megalographa monoxyla =

Scientific classification
- Kingdom: Animalia
- Phylum: Arthropoda
- Class: Insecta
- Order: Lepidoptera
- Superfamily: Noctuoidea
- Family: Noctuidae
- Genus: Megalographa
- Species: M. monoxyla

Binomial name
- Megalographa monoxyla (Dyar, 1913)

Synonyms
- Plusia monoxyla Dyar, 1913

Species of moth

Megalographa monoxyla is a moth of the family Noctuidae. It is found only in Peru and Bolivia and has a narrow distribution in the Andes.
