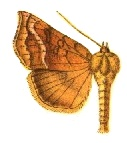

Scientific classification
- Domain: Eukaryota
- Kingdom: Animalia
- Phylum: Arthropoda
- Class: Insecta
- Order: Lepidoptera
- Superfamily: Noctuoidea
- Family: Noctuidae
- Genus: Pseudeva
- Species: P. palligera

Binomial name
- Pseudeva palligera (Grote, 1881)

Synonyms
- Deva palligera Grote, 1881; Pseudeva rubigera Hampson, 1913

= Pseudeva palligera =

Species of moth

Pseudeva palligera, the western unspotted looper, is a moth of the family Noctuidae found in western North America. It has been recorded from British Columbia to California.

The wingspan is 29–30 mm. The larvae probably feed on Thalictrum.
