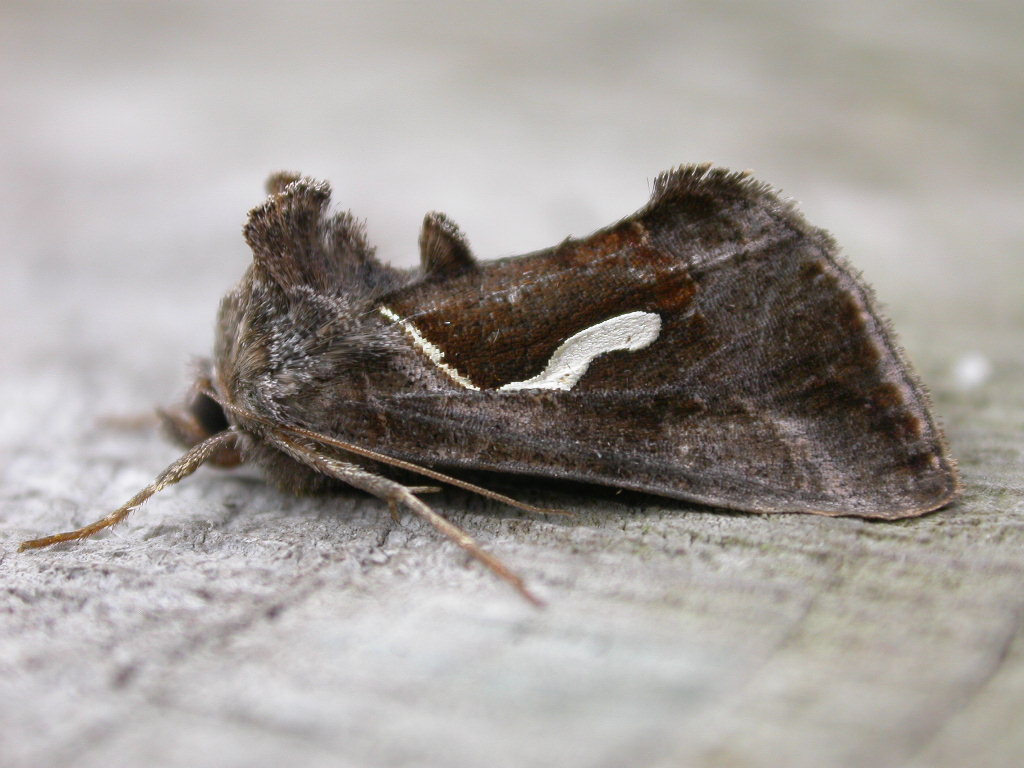

Scientific classification
- Domain: Eukaryota
- Kingdom: Animalia
- Phylum: Arthropoda
- Class: Insecta
- Order: Lepidoptera
- Superfamily: Noctuoidea
- Family: Noctuidae
- Genus: Macdunnoughia
- Species: M. confusa

Binomial name
- Macdunnoughia confusa (Stephens, 1850)

= Macdunnoughia confusa =

Species of moth

Macdunnoughia confusa, or Dewick’s plusia, is a moth of the family Noctuidae. It was first described by James Francis Stephens in 1850. It is found from Europe through Siberia to Japan and is also present in Lebanon and Israel.

The wingspan is 30–38 millimetres (1.2–1.5 in). The length of the forewings is 12–17 millimetres (0.47–0.67 in). The moth flies in three generations from April to October.

The larvae feed on various herbaceous plants such as Lamium, nettle, Artemisia absinthium and chamomile.

== Notes ==
1. The flight season refers to Belgium and The Netherlands. This may vary in other parts of the range.
