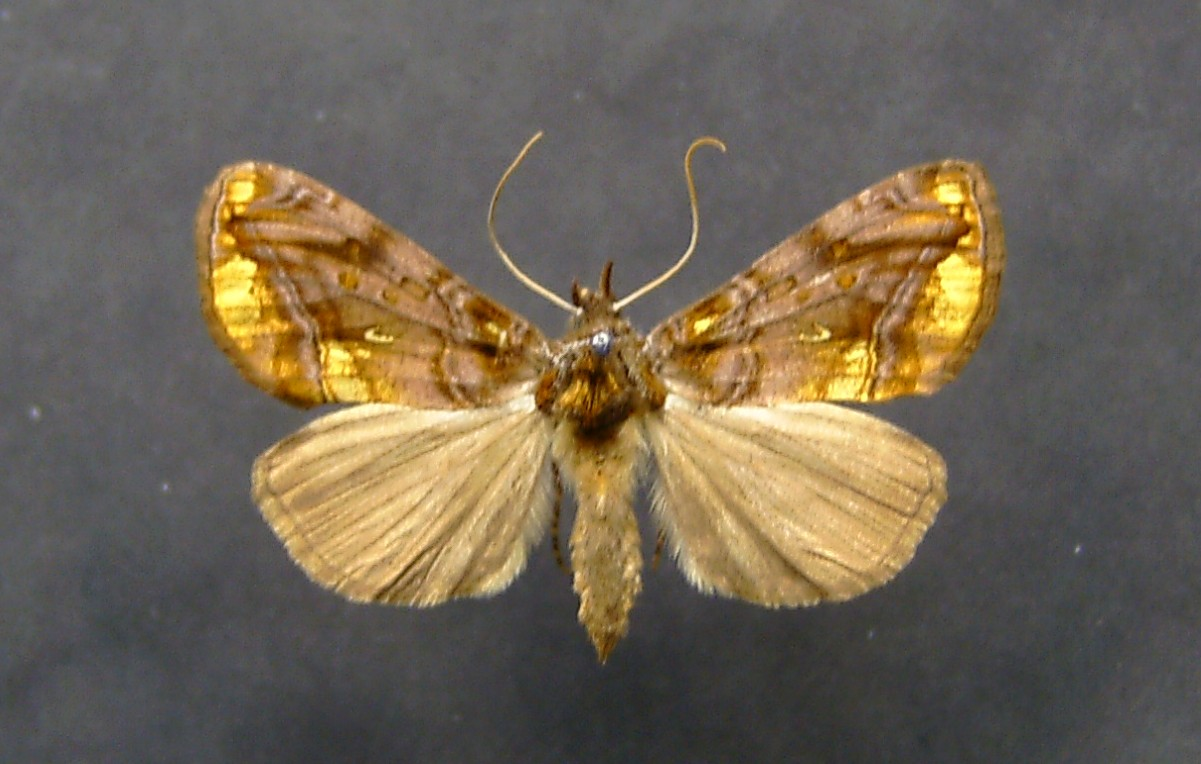

Scientific classification
- Domain: Eukaryota
- Kingdom: Animalia
- Phylum: Arthropoda
- Class: Insecta
- Order: Lepidoptera
- Superfamily: Noctuoidea
- Family: Noctuidae
- Genus: Lamprotes
- Species: L. c-aureum

Binomial name
- Lamprotes c-aureum (Knoch, 1781)

= Lamprotes c-aureum =

Species of moth

Lamprotes c-aureum is a moth of the family Noctuidae. It is found from Southern Scandinavia to the Southern Alps and from Western Europe up to West Siberia.

The wingspan is 34–40 mm. The moths are on wing from June to September depending on the location.

The larvae feed on Thalictrum species, such as Thalictrum flavum and Thalictrum aquilegiifolium and Aquilegia vulgaris.
