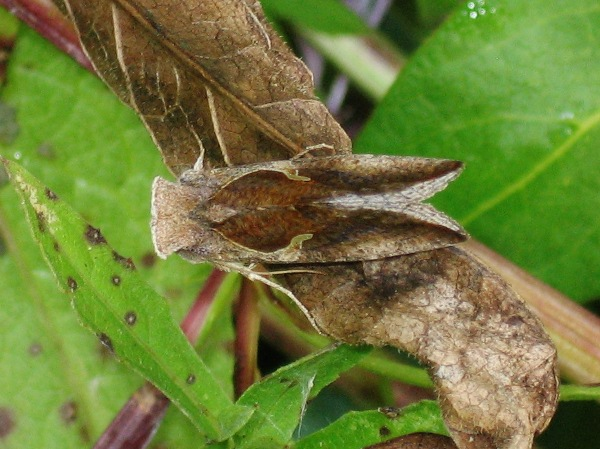

Scientific classification
- Domain: Eukaryota
- Kingdom: Animalia
- Phylum: Arthropoda
- Class: Insecta
- Order: Lepidoptera
- Superfamily: Noctuoidea
- Family: Noctuidae
- Genus: Anagrapha
- Species: A. falcifera

Binomial name
- Anagrapha falcifera Kirby, 1837

Synonyms
- Plusia falcifera; Autographa norma; Autographa simplicima; Plusia simplex

= Anagrapha falcifera =

Celery looper

Species of moth

Anagrapha falcifera, the celery looper, is a moth of the family Noctuidae. The species was first described by William Kirby in 1837. It is found in North America from Newfoundland, Labrador and southern Canada to Georgia, Mississippi, Texas, Arizona, Idaho, Washington and Oregon.

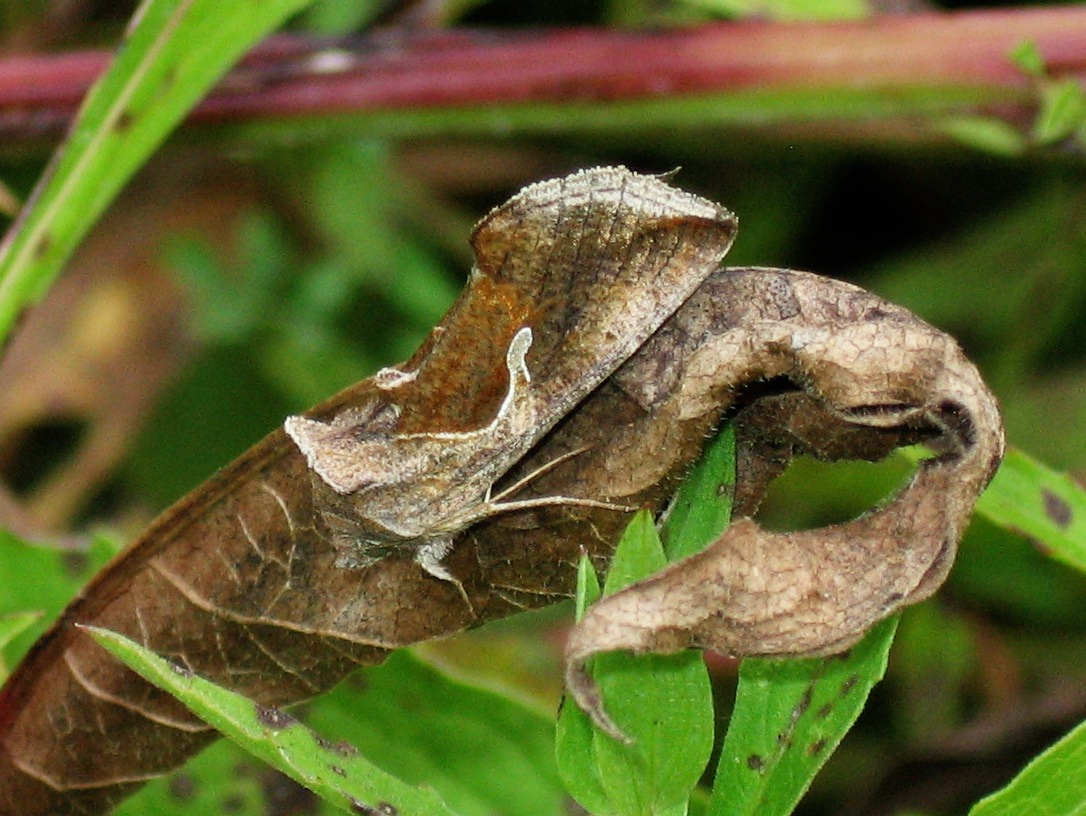
Adult on leaf, showing the great camouflage

The wingspan is 35–40 mm.

The larvae feed on beets, blueberries, clover, corn, lettuce, plantain, viburnum and other low plants.
