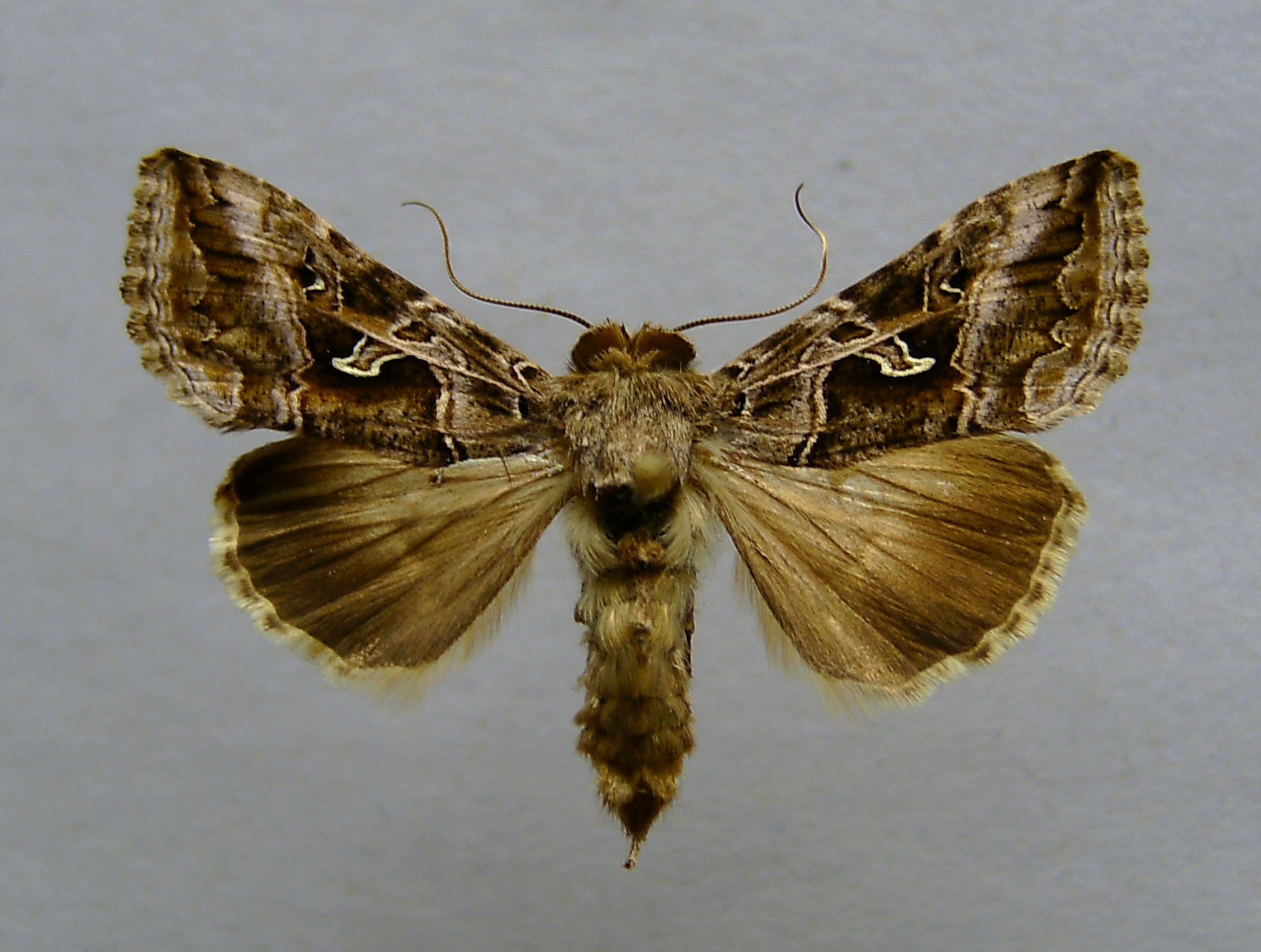

Scientific classification
- Kingdom: Animalia
- Phylum: Arthropoda
- Class: Insecta
- Order: Lepidoptera
- Superfamily: Noctuoidea
- Family: Noctuidae
- Genus: Cornutiplusia
- Species: C. circumflexa

Binomial name
- Cornutiplusia circumflexa (Linnaeus, 1767)

Synonyms
- Phalaena Noctua circumflexa Linnaeus, 1767 Noctua circumflexa (Linnaeus) Plusia circumflexa (Linnaeus) Autographa circumflexa (Linnaeus): Phalaena circumflexa; Noctua lunata; Plusia graphica; Plusia patefacta; Plusia reticulata; Syngrapha circumflexa (Linnaeus)

= Cornutiplusia circumflexa =

Essex y

Species of moth

Cornutiplusia circumflexa, the Essex y, is a moth of the family Noctuidae. It is found from Italy to Greece, southeastern Europe, southwestern Russia, the southern parts of the Ural, Africa, Canary Islands, Arabia, southwestern Asia, Ceylon, from India to Nepal, southeastern China and Japan.

== Technical description and variation ==
S. circumflexa L. (= daubei Frr. nec Bsd., graphica H-Sch, patefacta Walk.) (64c). Forewing grey, suffused with fuscous in median and terminal areas; inner and outer lines pale, double, with dark brown centre: the inner oblique inwards below middle, obscure above; the outer, also oblique, irregularly lunulate dentate, slightly mangled on vein 2 and the fold below it, followed by a pale grey band which broadens towards costa; subterminal line irregularly dentate and flexuous, preceded by a dark fuscous shade and black wedge shaped marks; stigmata pale grey, with first dark, then pale lustrous outlines; median vein pale; the subcellular mark broad, bent at rigid angles in middle, its centre pale brown, edged first with dark, then with whitish yellow; hindwing smoky brown, with broad blackish terminal border. The wingspan is 34–50 mm.

== Biology ==
The moth flies year round depending on the location.

The larvae are polyphagous on various cultivated plants especially vegetables (such as potatoes) and on numerous wild plants (Solanaceae, Fabaceae, Cruciferae)
