= Euchalcia emichi =

Scientific classification
- Domain: Eukaryota
- Kingdom: Animalia
- Phylum: Arthropoda
- Class: Insecta
- Order: Lepidoptera
- Superfamily: Noctuoidea
- Family: Noctuidae
- Genus: Euchalcia
- Species: E. emichi

Binomial name
- Euchalcia emichi (Rogenhofer, 1873)

Synonyms
- Plusia emichi Rogenhofer, 1873

Species of moth

Euchalcia emichi is a moth of the family Noctuidae. It is widespread in Turkey, Armenia, Iran, Azerbaijan and Iraq. In the Levant it has been recorded from Syria, Lebanon and Israel.

Adults are on wing from May to July. There is one generation per year. The larvae had been recorded in Turkey on a yellow flowered Nonea sp. (Boraginaceae).
