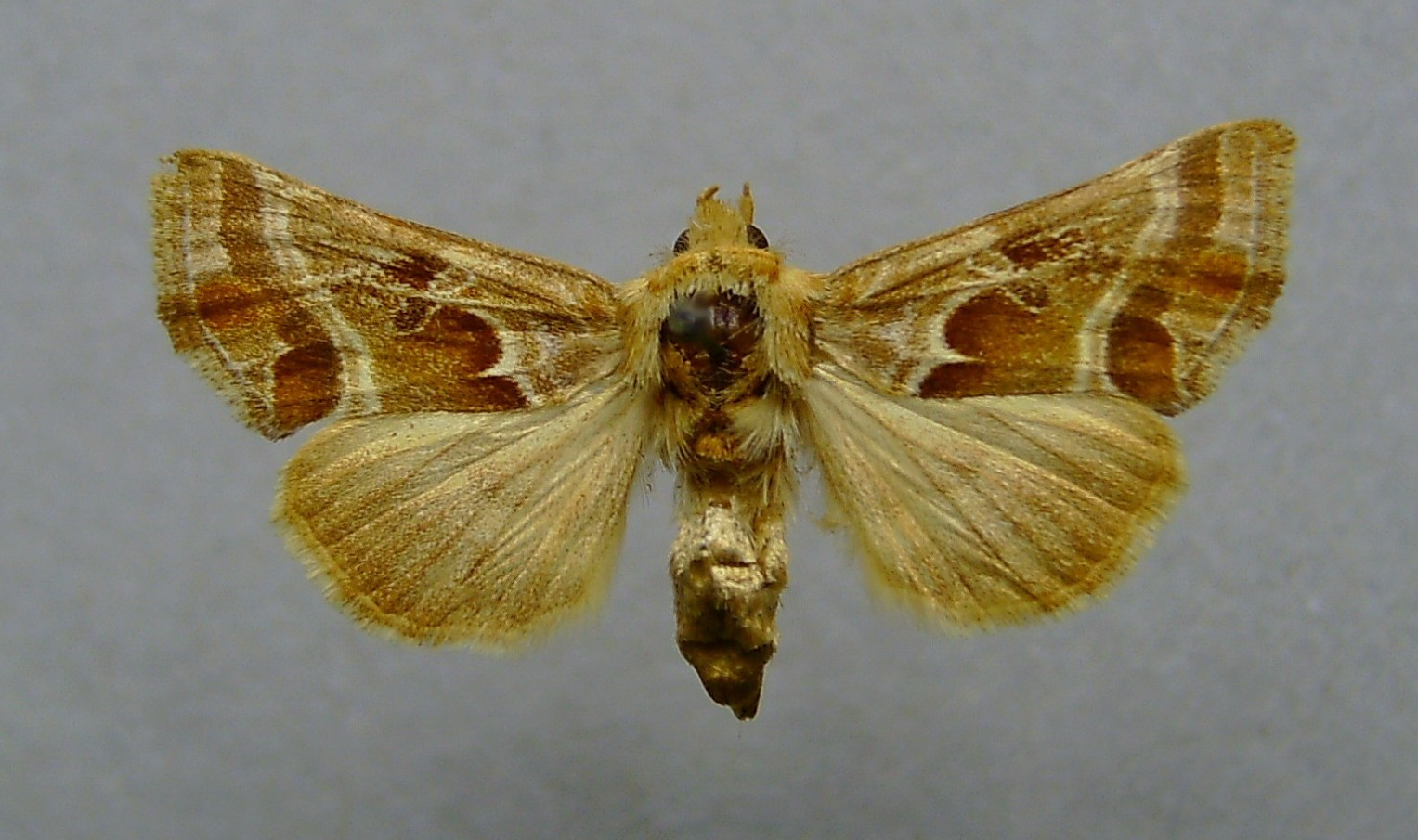

Scientific classification
- Domain: Eukaryota
- Kingdom: Animalia
- Phylum: Arthropoda
- Class: Insecta
- Order: Lepidoptera
- Superfamily: Noctuoidea
- Family: Noctuidae
- Genus: Euchalcia
- Species: E. siderifera

Binomial name
- Euchalcia siderifera (Eversmann, 1856)

Synonyms
- Plusia siderifera Eversmann, 1856; Plusia beckeri Staudinger, 1861; Plusia calberlae Standfuss, 1884

= Euchalcia siderifera =

Species of moth

Euchalcia siderifera is a moth of the family Noctuidae. It is found in Italy, Greece and from Asia Minor through Russia up to the Ural Mountains and Altai Mountains.

The wingspan is 28–34 mm.

== Subspecies ==
- Euchalcia siderifera siderifera (Asia Minor, Caucasus, southern Urals, Kazakhstan, Tien Shan, Altai Mountains)
- Euchalcia siderifera achaiae Dufay, 1968 (Greece)
