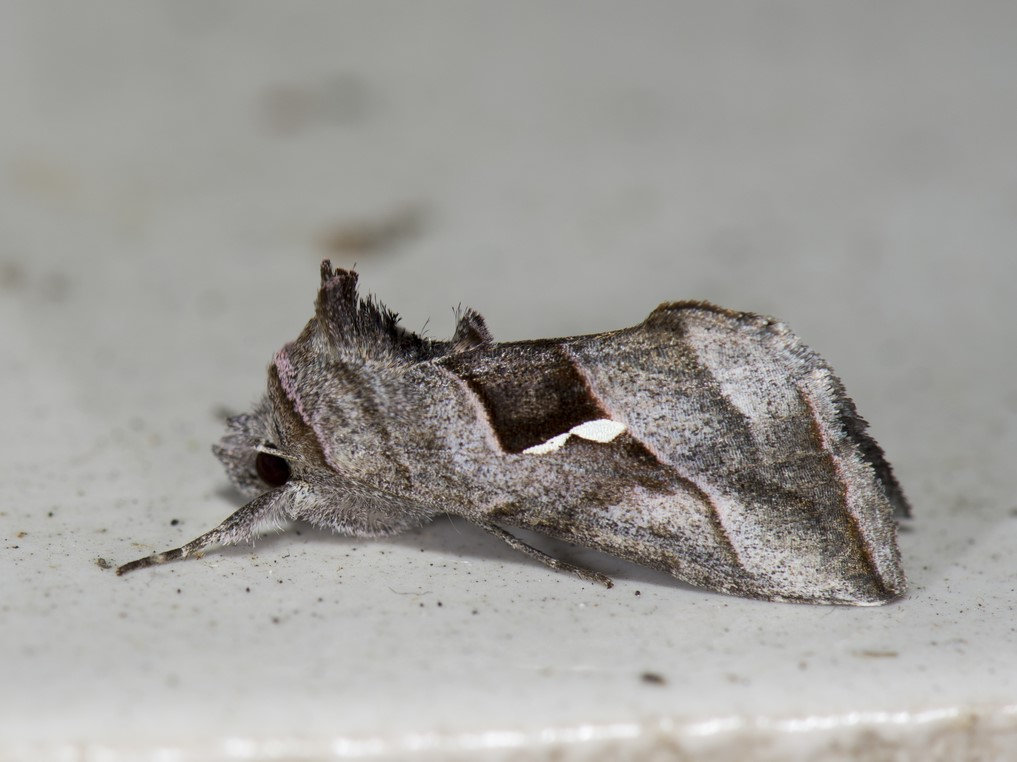

Scientific classification
- Domain: Eukaryota
- Kingdom: Animalia
- Phylum: Arthropoda
- Class: Insecta
- Order: Lepidoptera
- Superfamily: Noctuoidea
- Family: Noctuidae
- Genus: Macdunnoughia
- Species: M. tetragona

Binomial name
- Macdunnoughia tetragona (Walker, [1858])

Synonyms
- Plusia tetragona Walker, [1858]; Plusia semivitta Moore, 1867; Puriplusia zayuensis Chou & Lu, 1982

= Macdunnoughia tetragona =

Species of moth

Macdunnoughia tetragona is a species of moth in the family Noctuidae. It is found in Asia, including India and Taiwan.
