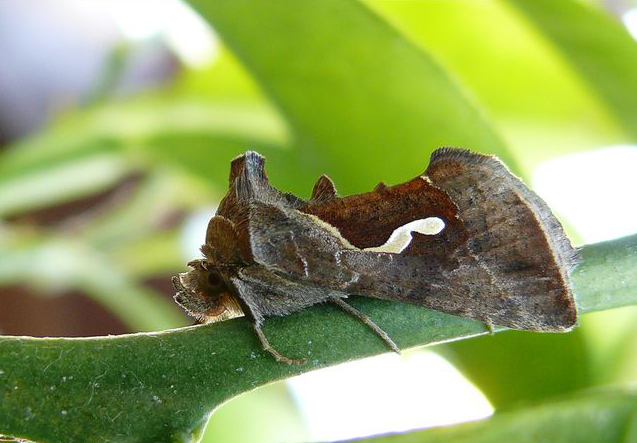
- Macdunnoughia confusa

Scientific classification
- Domain: Eukaryota
- Kingdom: Animalia
- Phylum: Arthropoda
- Class: Insecta
- Order: Lepidoptera
- Superfamily: Noctuoidea
- Family: Noctuidae
- Tribe: Plusiini
- Genus: Macdunnoughia; Kostrowicki, 1961

Synonyms
- Scleroplusia Ichinose, 1962; Puriplusia Chou & Lu, 1974

= Macdunnoughia =

Genus of moths

Macdunnoughia is a genus of moths of the family Noctuidae.

== Species ==
- Subgenus Macdunnoughia
  - Macdunnoughia confusa – Dewick's Plusia Stephens, 1850
  - Macdunnoughia crassisigna Warren, 1913
  - Macdunnoughia hybrida Ronkay, 1986
- Subgenus Puriplusia Chou & Lu, 1974
  - Macdunnoughia purissima Butler, 1878
  - Macdunnoughia tetragona Walker, [1858]
