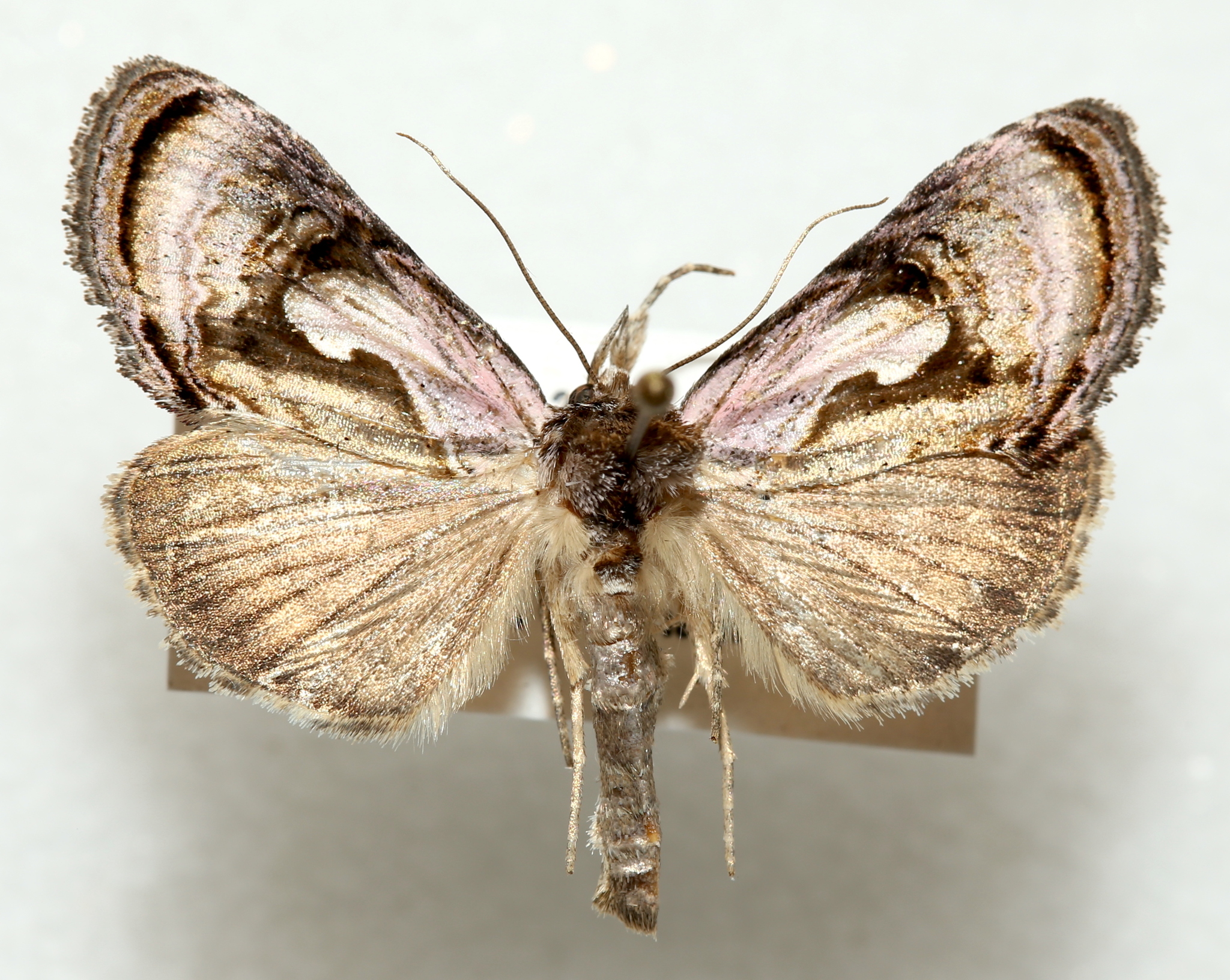

Scientific classification
- Kingdom: Animalia
- Phylum: Arthropoda
- Class: Insecta
- Order: Lepidoptera
- Superfamily: Noctuoidea
- Family: Noctuidae
- Genus: Chrysanympha
- Species: C. formosa

Binomial name
- Chrysanympha formosa (Grote, 1865)

Synonyms
- Leptina formosa Grote, 1865

= Chrysanympha formosa =

Formosa looper

Species of moth

Chrysanympha formosa, the Formosa looper, is a moth of the family Noctuidae. The species was first described by Augustus Radcliffe Grote in 1865. It is found in North America from Newfoundland west to Manitoba and south to the mountains of North Carolina and Tennessee.

The wingspan is 30–35 mm. Adults are on wing from July to August in Alberta and from June to August in the Great Smoky Mountains National Park. There is one generation per year.

The larvae have been recorded on Gaylussacia dumosa and Vaccinium species.
