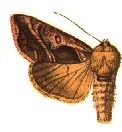

Scientific classification
- Kingdom: Animalia
- Phylum: Arthropoda
- Class: Insecta
- Order: Lepidoptera
- Superfamily: Noctuoidea
- Family: Noctuidae
- Genus: Autoplusia
- Species: A. egena

Binomial name
- Autoplusia egena (Guenée, 1852)

Synonyms
- Plusia egena; Syngrapha egena

= Autoplusia egena =

Bean leafskeletonizer

Species of moth

Autoplusia egena, the bean leafskeletonizer, is a moth of the family Noctuidae. It is found in California, North Carolina to the South-eastern parts of the United States, the Antilles, Mexico, Central America and South America. The subspecies Autoplusia egena galapagensis is endemic to the Galapagos islands.

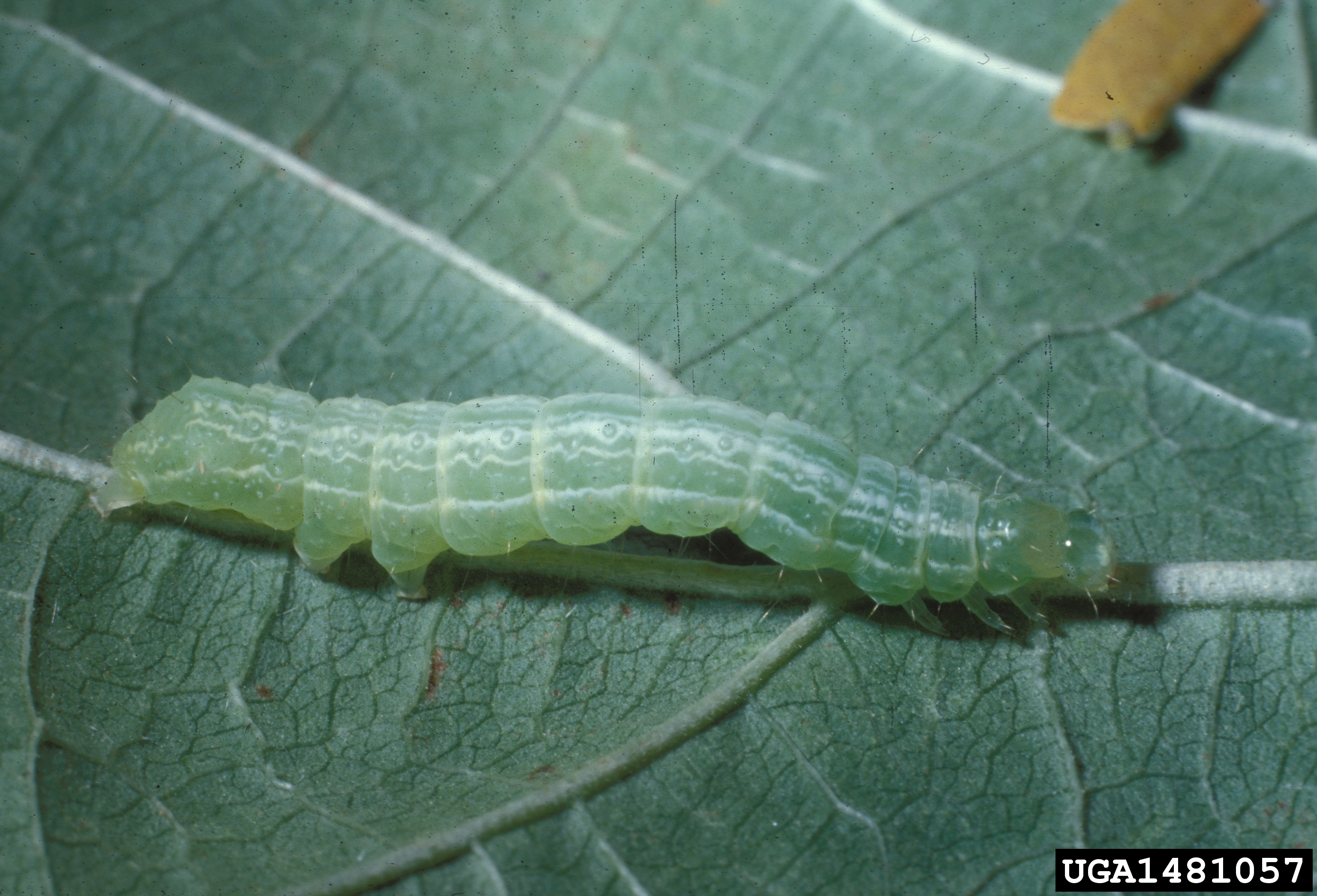
Caterpillar

The larvae feed on Amaryllidaceae, Apiaceae, Asteraceae, Boraginaceae, Brassicaceae, Fabaceae, Lamiaceae, Malvaceae, Ranunculaceae, Glycine max and Phaseolus vulgaris.

== Subspecies ==
- Autoplusia egena egena
- Autoplusia egena galapagensis
