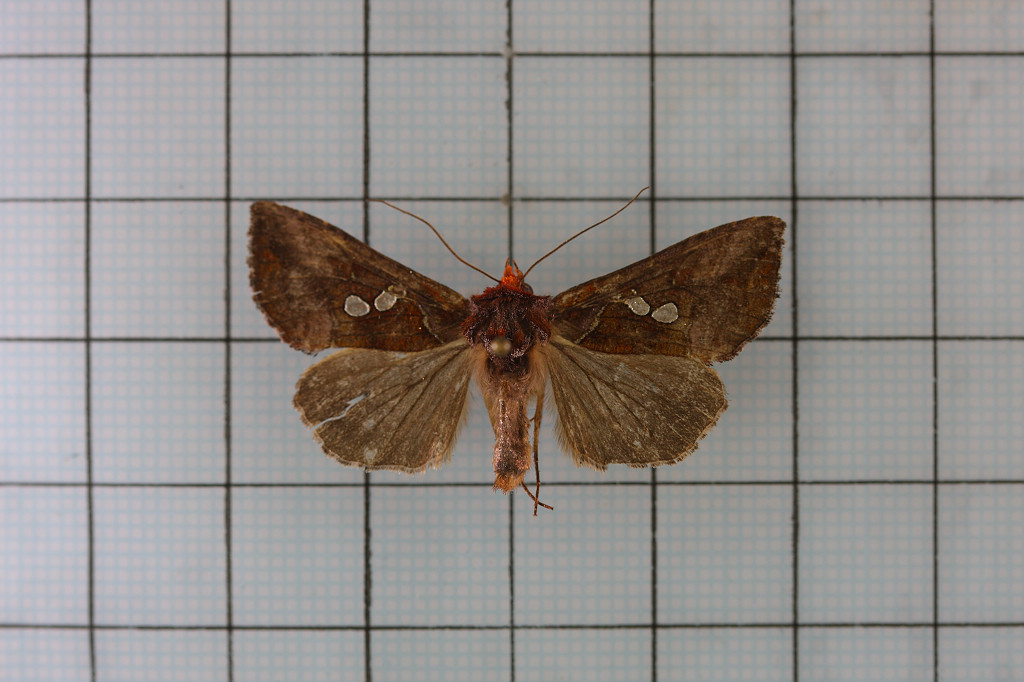

Scientific classification
- Domain: Eukaryota
- Kingdom: Animalia
- Phylum: Arthropoda
- Class: Insecta
- Order: Lepidoptera
- Superfamily: Noctuoidea
- Family: Noctuidae
- Genus: Antoculeora
- Species: A. yoshimotoi

Binomial name
- Antoculeora yoshimotoi Ronkay, 1997

= Antoculeora yoshimotoi =

Species of moth

Antoculeora yoshimotoi is a moth of the family Noctuidae. It is found in Taiwan.
