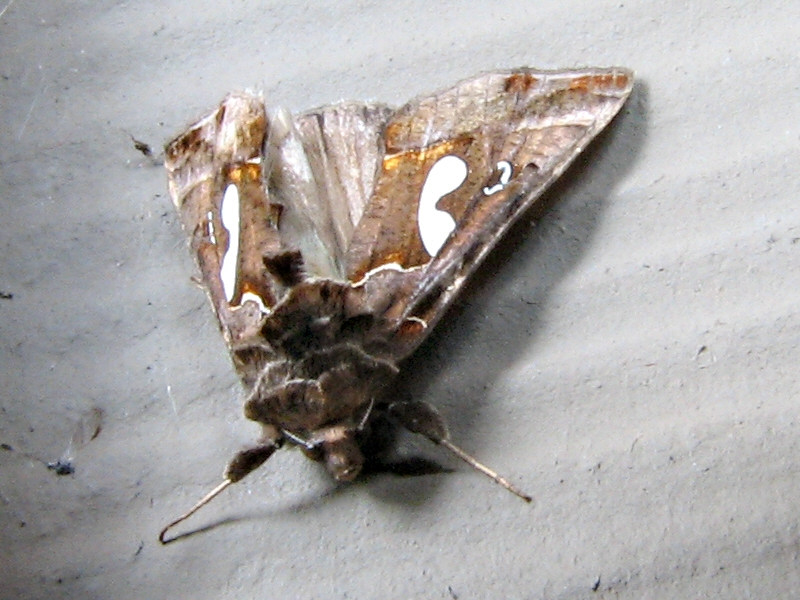

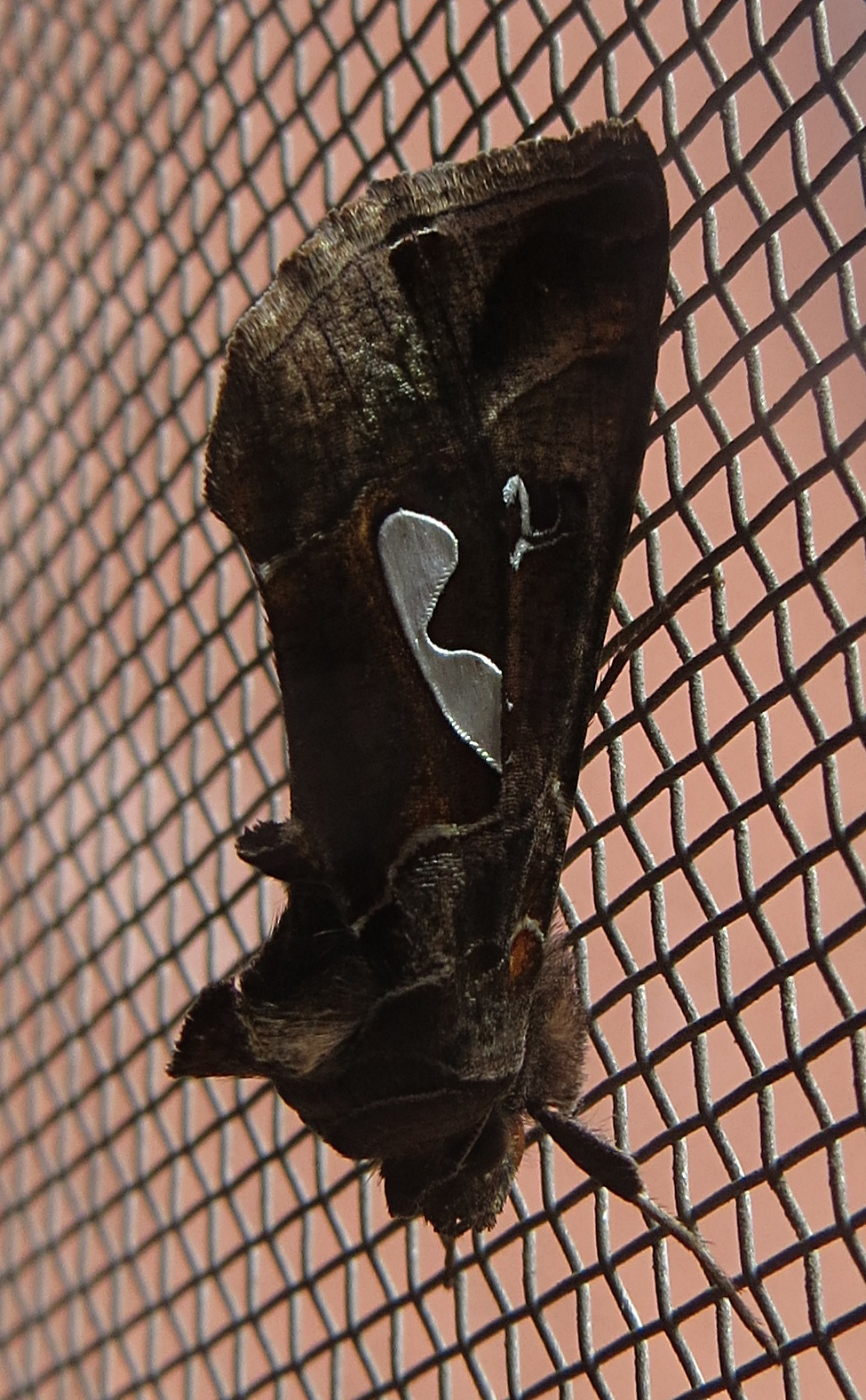

Scientific classification
- Domain: Eukaryota
- Kingdom: Animalia
- Phylum: Arthropoda
- Class: Insecta
- Order: Lepidoptera
- Superfamily: Noctuoidea
- Family: Noctuidae
- Genus: Megalographa
- Species: M. biloba

Binomial name
- Megalographa biloba (Stephens, 1830)

Synonyms
- Plusia biloba Stephens, 1830; Autographa biloba (Stephens, 1830)

= Megalographa biloba =

Species of moth

Stephens' gem or the bilobed looper (Megalographa biloba) is a moth of the family Noctuidae. It is widely distributed from the southern parts of the United States, south through Central America and South America to Argentina.

The wingspan is 38–44 mm.

It is sometimes considered a pest on cultivated lettuce.
