= Megalographa culminicola =

Scientific classification
- Domain: Eukaryota
- Kingdom: Animalia
- Phylum: Arthropoda
- Class: Insecta
- Order: Lepidoptera
- Superfamily: Noctuoidea
- Family: Noctuidae
- Genus: Megalographa
- Species: M. culminicola

Binomial name
- Megalographa culminicola Barbut and Piñas, 2007

Species of moth

Megalographa culminicola is a moth of the family Noctuidae. It is found in the páramo zone, on altitudes between 3,300 and 3,940 m in the Andes in Ecuador and northern Peru.
