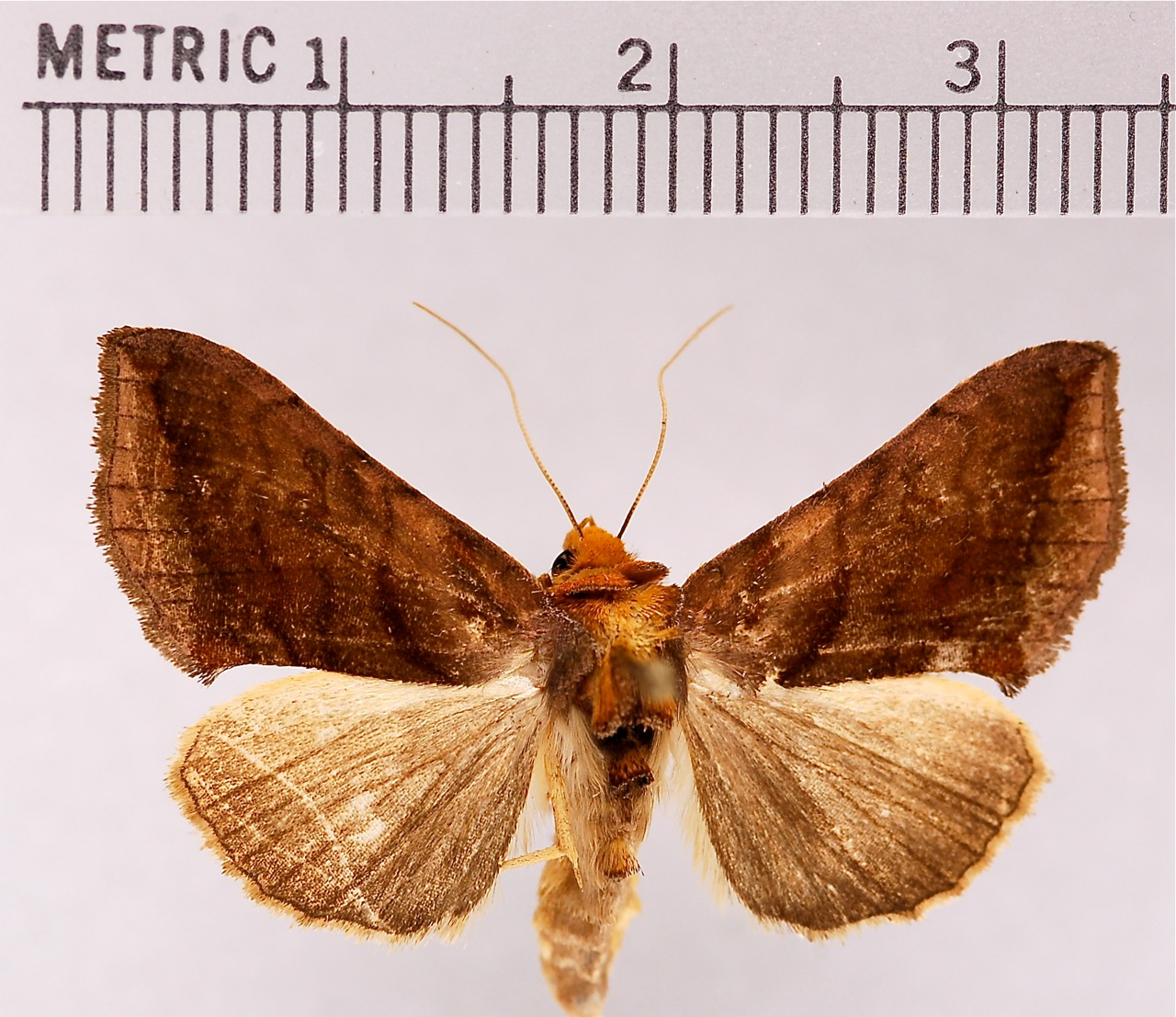

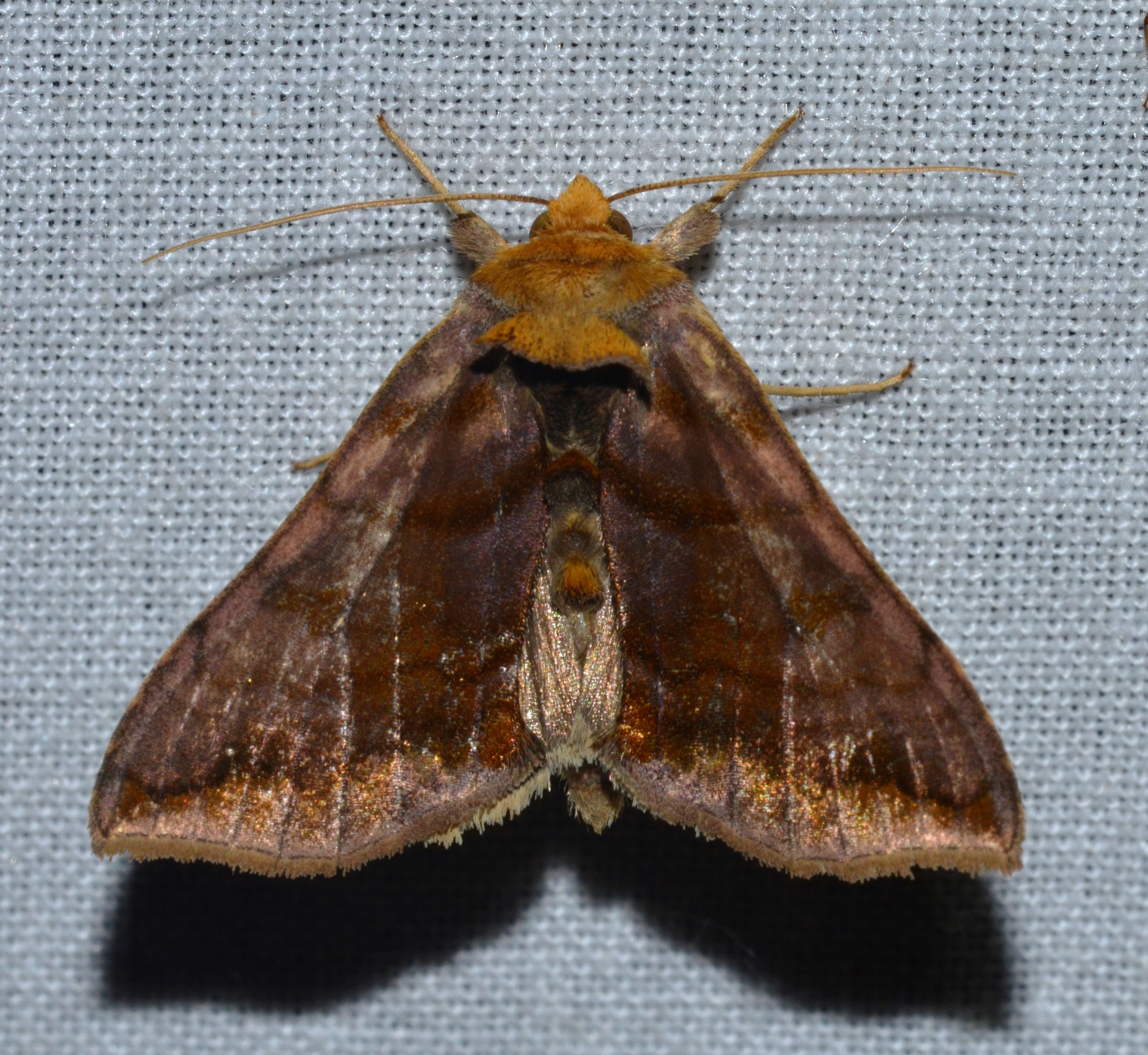

Scientific classification
- Kingdom: Animalia
- Phylum: Arthropoda
- Clade: Pancrustacea
- Class: Insecta
- Order: Lepidoptera
- Superfamily: Noctuoidea
- Family: Noctuidae
- Genus: Allagrapha
- Species: A. aerea

Binomial name
- Allagrapha aerea (Hübner, [1803])

Synonyms
- Noctua aerea Hübner, 1803

= Allagrapha aerea =

Species of moth

Allagrapha aerea, the unspotted looper moth or copper looper moth, is a moth of the family Noctuidae. The species was first described by Jacob Hübner in 1803. It is found in eastern North America from southern Ontario to the Florida Panhandle and west to western Nebraska.

The wingspan is 28–42 mm. Adults are on wing from April to September or to October in the south. There are two generations per year.

The larvae are probably general feeders on herbaceous plants. Larvae have been recorded on Urtica, Aster umbellatus and soybeans.
