= Euchalcia maria =

Scientific classification
- Kingdom: Animalia
- Phylum: Arthropoda
- Class: Insecta
- Order: Lepidoptera
- Superfamily: Noctuoidea
- Family: Noctuidae
- Genus: Euchalcia
- Species: E. maria

Binomial name
- Euchalcia maria (Staudinger, 1891)

Synonyms
- Plusia maria Staudinger, 1891

Species of moth

Euchalcia maria is a moth of the family Noctuidae. It is endemic of the Levant. It is found from south-eastern Turkey to Israel.

Adults are on wing from March to May. There is one generation per year.
