= Autoplusia egenoides =

Scientific classification
- Domain: Eukaryota
- Kingdom: Animalia
- Phylum: Arthropoda
- Class: Insecta
- Order: Lepidoptera
- Superfamily: Noctuoidea
- Family: Noctuidae
- Genus: Autoplusia
- Species: A. egenoides

Binomial name
- Autoplusia egenoides (Strand, 1917)

Species of moth

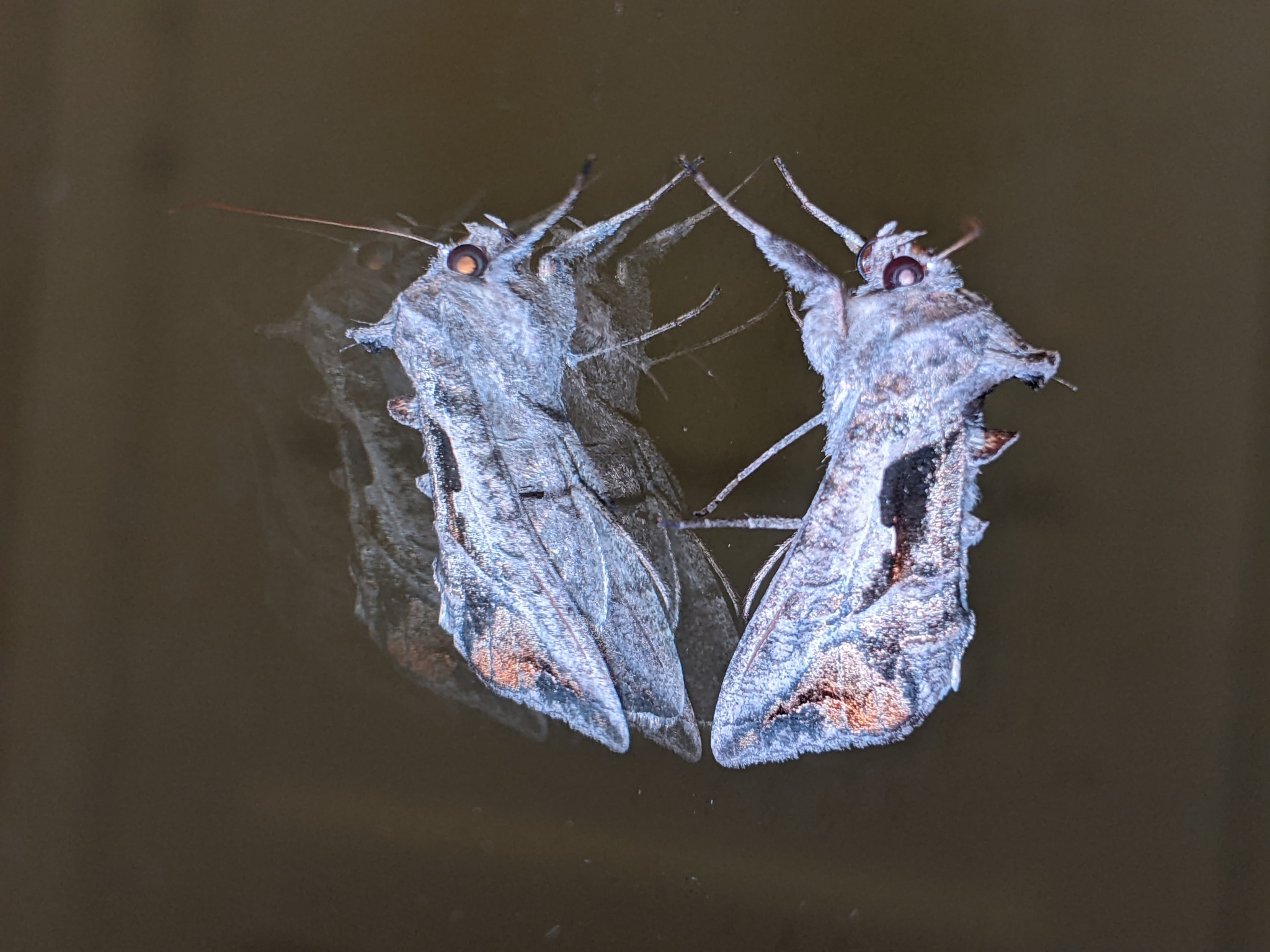
Autoplusia egenoides

Autoplusia egenoides is a species of looper moth in the family Noctuidae. It is found in North America.

The MONA or Hodges number for Autoplusia egenoides is 8893.
