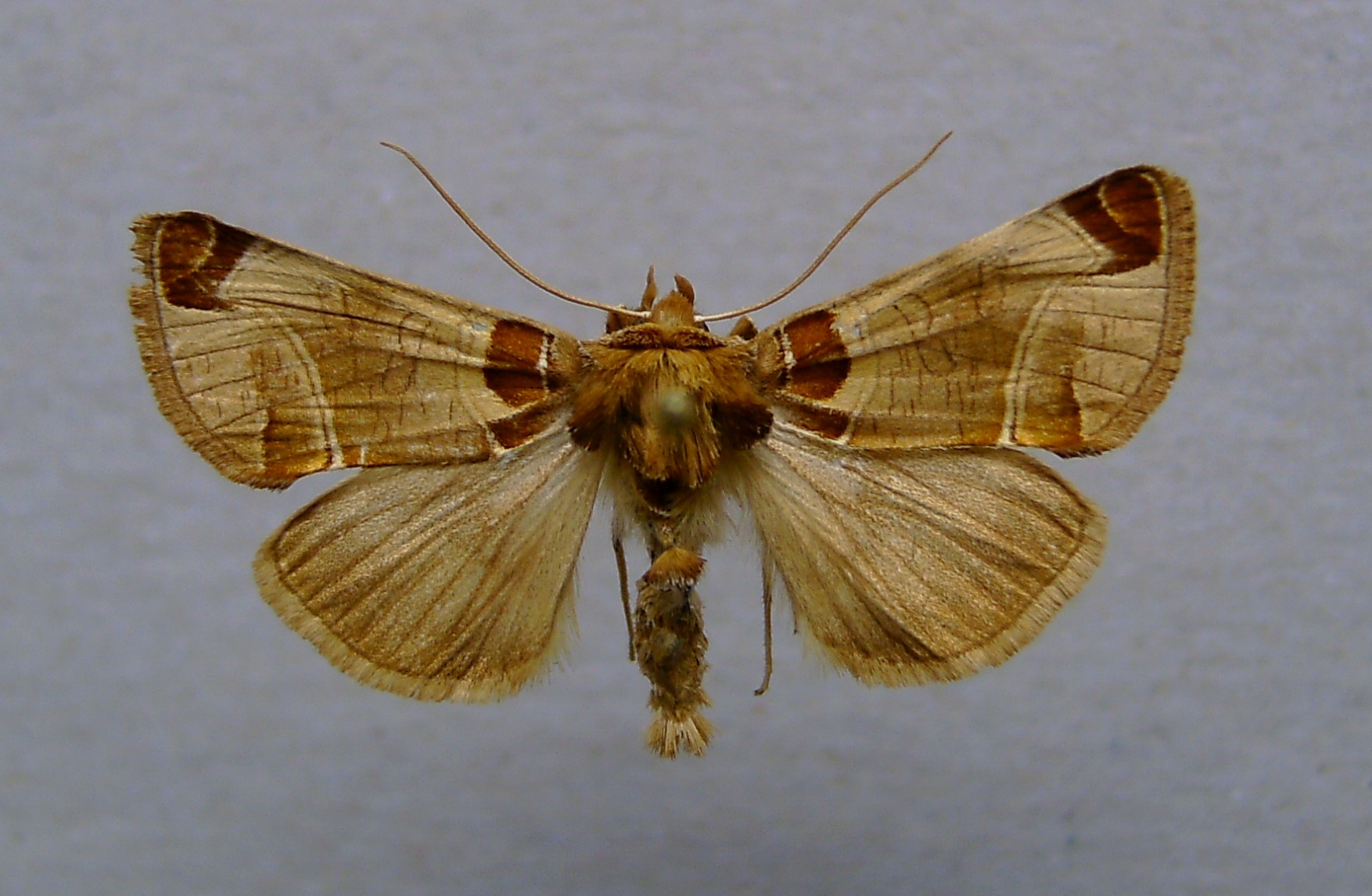

Scientific classification
- Domain: Eukaryota
- Kingdom: Animalia
- Phylum: Arthropoda
- Class: Insecta
- Order: Lepidoptera
- Superfamily: Noctuoidea
- Family: Noctuidae
- Genus: Plusidia
- Species: P. cheiranthi

Binomial name
- Plusidia cheiranthi (Tauscher, 1809)

Synonyms
- Noctua cheiranthi Tauscher, 1809; Plusidia abrostoloides Butler, 1879; Plusia eygenia Eversmann, 1841; Plusidia separanda Warren, 1913

= Plusidia cheiranthi =

Species of moth

Plusidia cheiranthi is a moth of the family Noctuidae. It is found in Southern and Eastern Europe, in Turkey, Siberia and eastwards to the Pacific Ocean.

The wingspan is 32–36 mm. Adults are on wing from June to August in one generation per year.

The larvae feed on the leaves of Thalictrum, Aquilegia and Erysimum species. The egg overwinters.

== Literature ==
- Barry Goater, László Ronkay und Michael Fibiger: Catocalinae & Plusiinae Noctuidae Europaeae, Volume 10., Sorø 2003 ISBN 87-89430-08-5
