= Euchalcia paulina =

Scientific classification
- Kingdom: Animalia
- Phylum: Arthropoda
- Class: Insecta
- Order: Lepidoptera
- Superfamily: Noctuoidea
- Family: Noctuidae
- Genus: Euchalcia
- Species: E. paulina

Binomial name
- Euchalcia paulina (Staudinger, 1891)

Synonyms
- Plusia emichi var. paulina Staudinger, 1891

Species of moth

Euchalcia paulina is a moth of the family Noctuidae. It is endemic to the Levant. It is found from Jordan to Israel.

Adults are on wing from March to May. There is one generation per year.
