= Euchalcia bellieri =

Scientific classification
- Domain: Eukaryota
- Kingdom: Animalia
- Phylum: Arthropoda
- Class: Insecta
- Order: Lepidoptera
- Superfamily: Noctuoidea
- Family: Noctuidae
- Genus: Euchalcia
- Species: E. bellieri

Binomial name
- Euchalcia bellieri (Kirby, 1903)

Synonyms
- Euchalcia galloi Berio, 1989; Plusia bellieri Kirby, 1900

Species of moth

Euchalcia bellieri is a moth of the family Noctuidae.

== Etymology ==
Latin species name bellieri honors the French entomologist Jean-Baptiste Eugène Bellier de la Chavignerie (1819-1888).

== Description ==
Euchalcia bellieri has a wingspan of about 33–34 millimetres (1.3–1.3 in). This rare species closely resemble Euchalcia variabilis, but it is quite smaller. The upperside of the forewings shows a well marked oblique inner line with a slight rosy border. The central area is dark brown, while the hind margin is rosy. The basal dark line is angulated. The orbicular stigma is double, with a yellow ring. Larvae are green with a white lateral line.

Caterpillars feed on Delphinium dubium, maybe also on Aconitum species. They are fully grown at the end of June, while adults fly in July.

== Distribution ==
This species is endemic to France (Hautes-Alpes, Basses-Alpes, Alpes Maritimes) and to a northern Italian Region (Piedmont).
