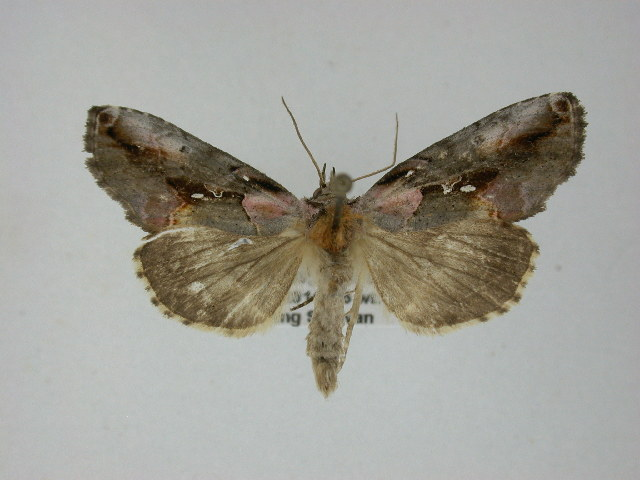
- Eosphoropteryx thyatyroides

Scientific classification
- Kingdom: Animalia
- Phylum: Arthropoda
- Class: Insecta
- Order: Lepidoptera
- Superfamily: Noctuoidea
- Family: Noctuidae
- Subfamily: Plusiinae
- Genus: Eosphoropteryx; Dyar, 1902

= Eosphoropteryx =

Genus of moths

Eosphoropteryx is a genus of moths of the family Noctuidae.

== Species ==
- Eosphoropteryx thyatyroides Guenée, 1852
