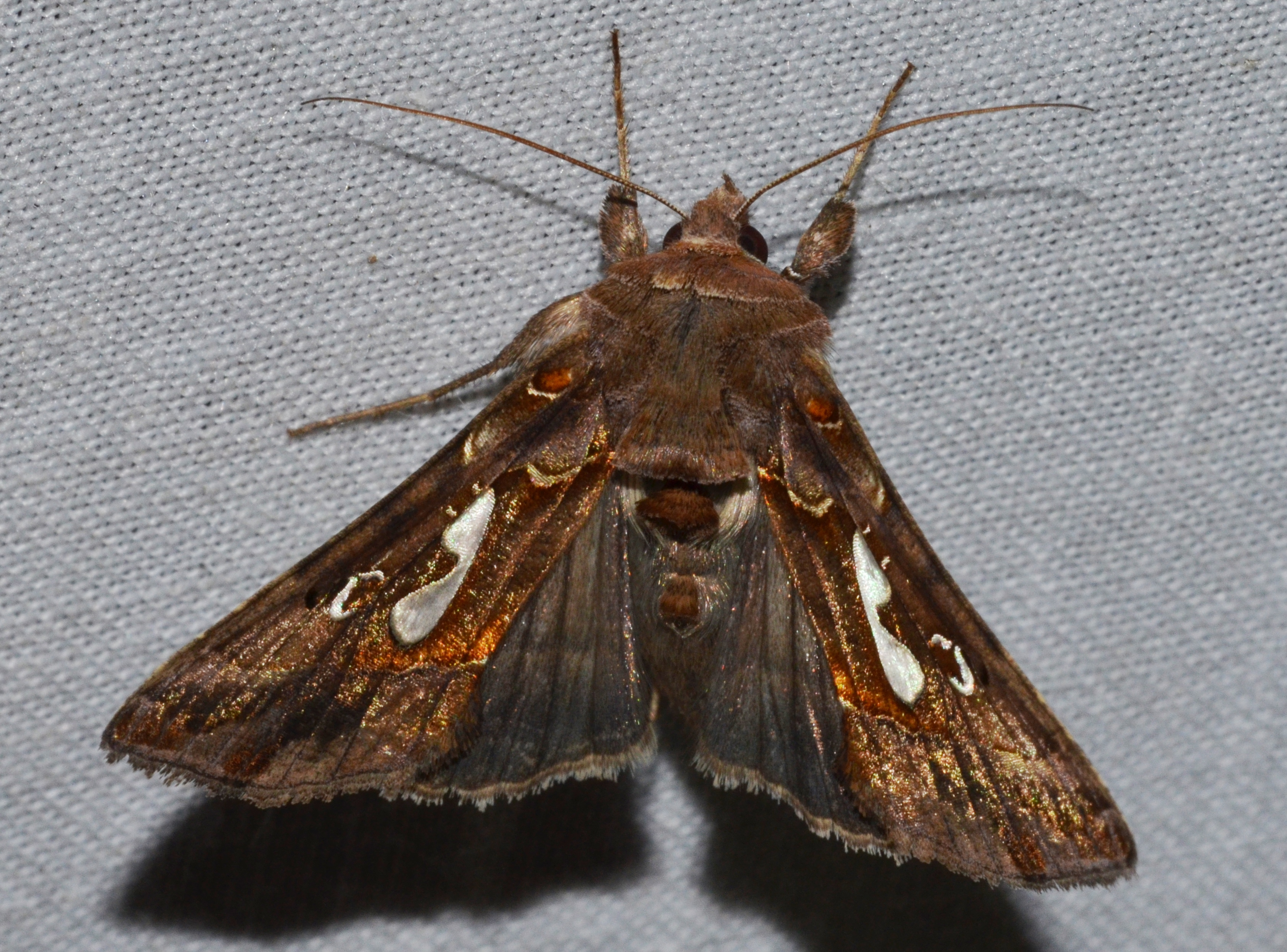
- Megalographa biloba

Scientific classification
- Domain: Eukaryota
- Kingdom: Animalia
- Phylum: Arthropoda
- Class: Insecta
- Order: Lepidoptera
- Superfamily: Noctuoidea
- Family: Noctuidae
- Subtribe: Plusiina
- Genus: Megalographa; Lafontaine & Poole, 1991

= Megalographa =

Genus of moths

Megalographa is a genus of moths of the family Noctuidae.

== Species ==
- Megalographa agualaniata (Dognin, 1912)
- Megalographa biloba (Stephens, 1830)
- Megalographa bonaerensis (Berg, 1882)
- Megalographa culminicola Barbut and Piñas, 2007
- Megalographa monoxyla (Dyar, 1913)
- Megalographa talamanca Lafontaine and Sullivan, 2009
