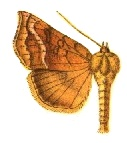
- Pseudeva palligera

Scientific classification
- Kingdom: Animalia
- Phylum: Arthropoda
- Class: Insecta
- Order: Lepidoptera
- Superfamily: Noctuoidea
- Family: Noctuidae
- Genus: Pseudeva; Hampson, 1913

= Pseudeva =

Genus of moths

Pseudeva is a genus of moths of the family Noctuidae.

== Species ==
- Pseudeva palligera Grote, 1881
- Pseudeva purpurigera Walker, 1858
