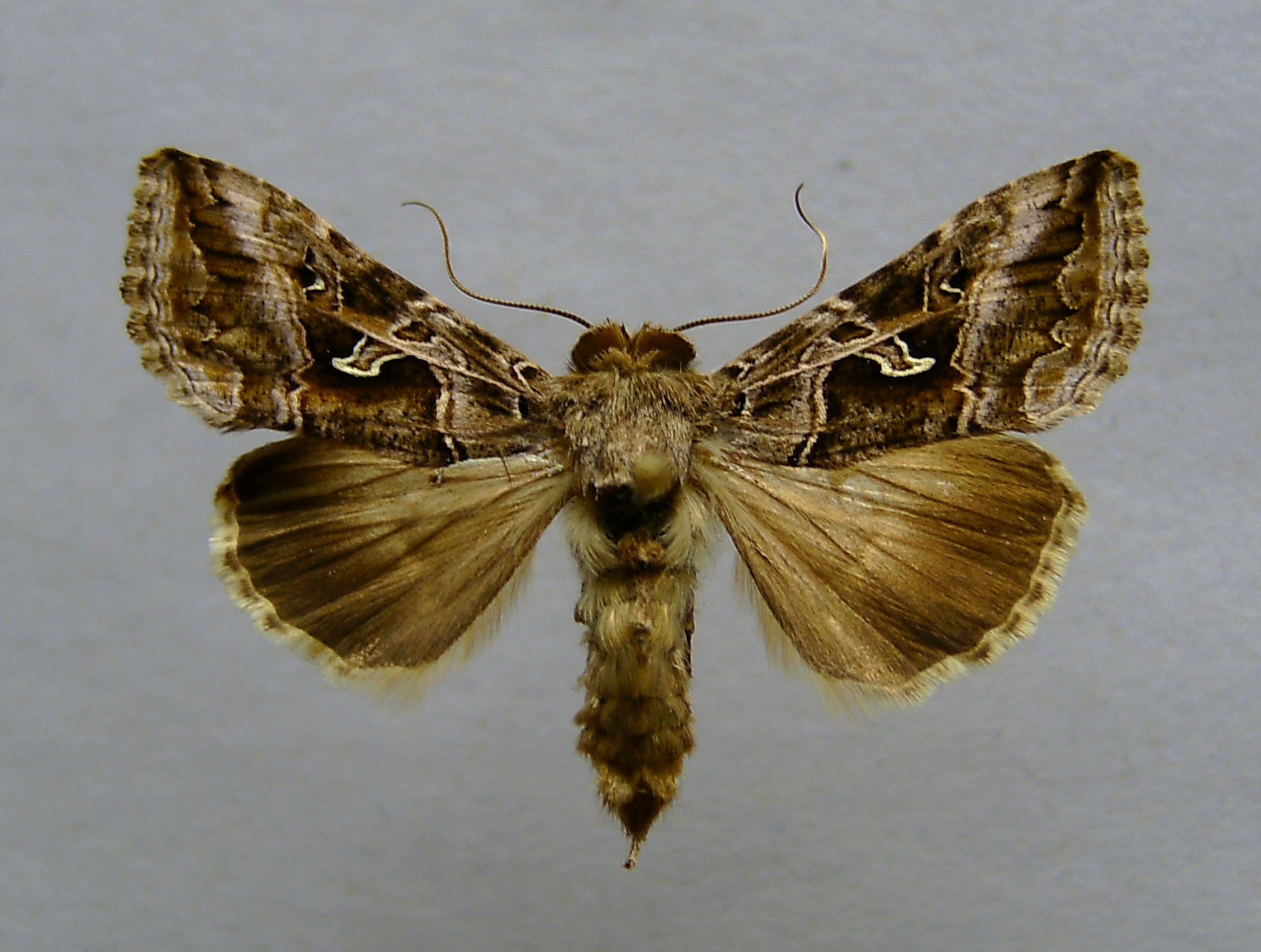
- Cornutiplusia circumflexa

Scientific classification
- Domain: Eukaryota
- Kingdom: Animalia
- Phylum: Arthropoda
- Class: Insecta
- Order: Lepidoptera
- Superfamily: Noctuoidea
- Family: Noctuidae
- Subtribe: Plusiina
- Genus: Cornutiplusia; Kostrowicki, 1961

= Cornutiplusia =

Genus of moths

Cornutiplusia is a genus of moths of the family Noctuidae.

== Species ==
- Cornutiplusia circumflexa – Essex Y (Linnaeus, 1767)
