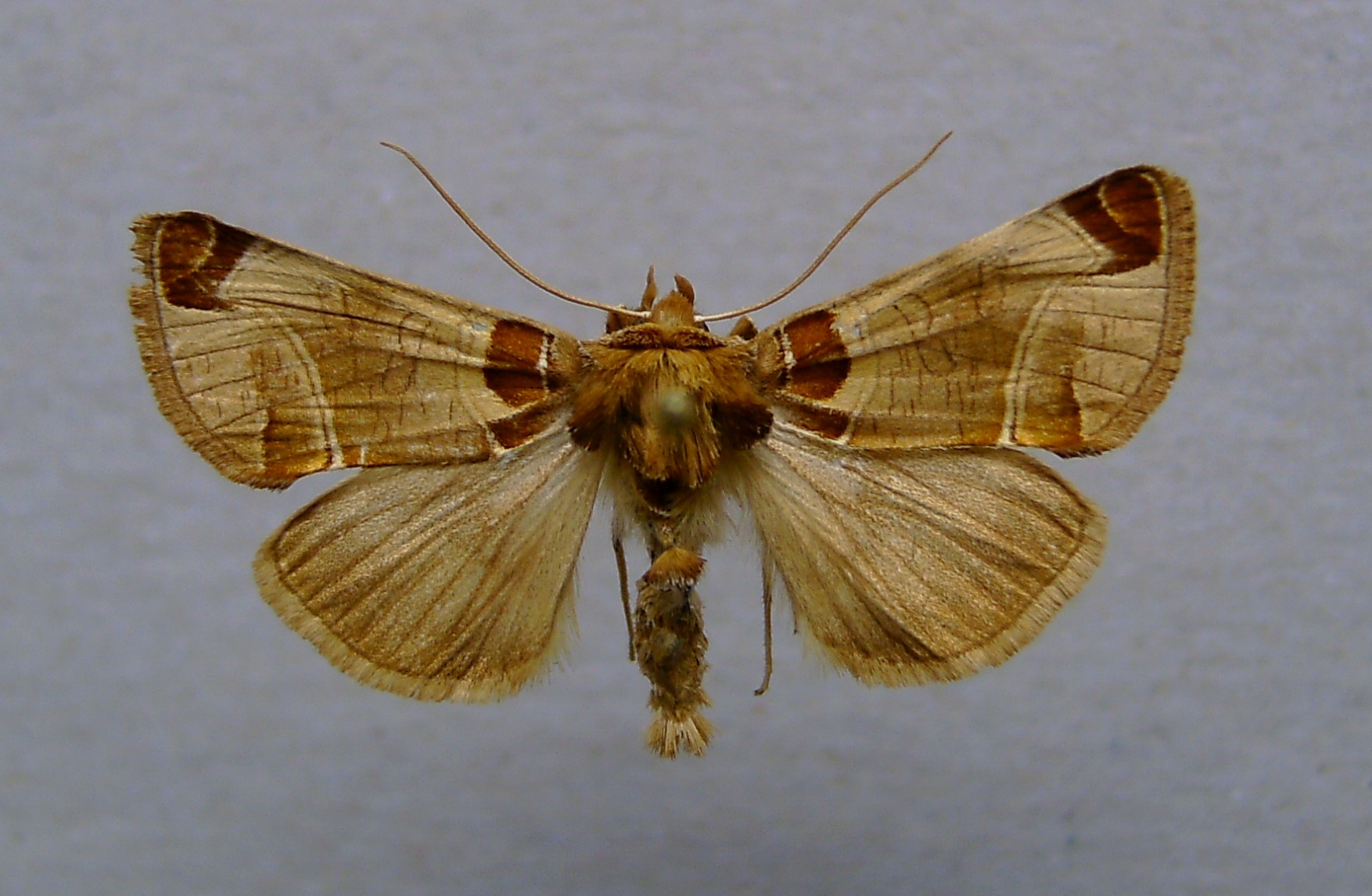
- Plusidia cheiranthi

Scientific classification
- Domain: Eukaryota
- Kingdom: Animalia
- Phylum: Arthropoda
- Class: Insecta
- Order: Lepidoptera
- Superfamily: Noctuoidea
- Family: Noctuidae
- Subfamily: Plusiinae
- Genus: Plusidia; Butler, 1879

= Plusidia =

Genus of moths

Plusidia is a genus of moths of the family Noctuidae.

== Species ==
- Plusidia cheiranthi Tauscher, 1809
