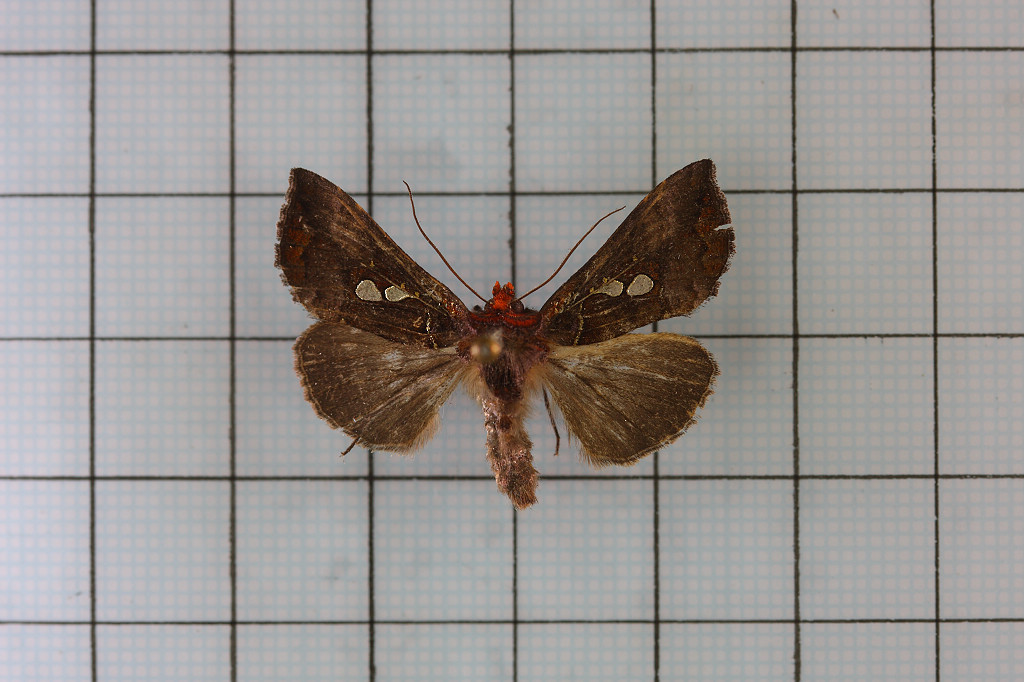
- Antoculeora yoshimotoi

Scientific classification
- Domain: Eukaryota
- Kingdom: Animalia
- Phylum: Arthropoda
- Class: Insecta
- Order: Lepidoptera
- Superfamily: Noctuoidea
- Family: Noctuidae
- Subfamily: Plusiinae
- Genus: Antoculeora; Ichinose, 1973

= Antoculeora =

Genus of moths

Antoculeora is a genus of moths of the family Noctuidae.

== Species ==
- Antoculeora locuples Oberthür, 1880
- Antoculeora lushanensis Chou & Lu, 1978
- Antoculeora ornatissima Walker, 1858
- Antoculeora yoshimotoi Ronkay, 1997
