= Notioplusia =

Scientific classification
- Kingdom: Animalia
- Phylum: Arthropoda
- Clade: Pancrustacea
- Class: Insecta
- Order: Lepidoptera
- Superfamily: Noctuoidea
- Family: Noctuidae
- Subfamily: Plusiinae
- Genus: Notioplusia; Lafontaine & Poole, 1991

Genus of moths

Notioplusia is a genus of moths of the family Noctuidae.

== Species ==
- Notioplusia illustrata Guenée, 1852
