= Anagrapha =

Scientific classification
- Domain: Eukaryota
- Kingdom: Animalia
- Phylum: Arthropoda
- Class: Insecta
- Order: Lepidoptera
- Superfamily: Noctuoidea
- Family: Noctuidae
- Subtribe: Plusiina
- Genus: Anagrapha; McDunnough, 1944

Genus of moths

Anagrapha is a genus of moths of the family Noctuidae.

== Species ==
- Anagrapha falcifera (Kirby, 1837)
