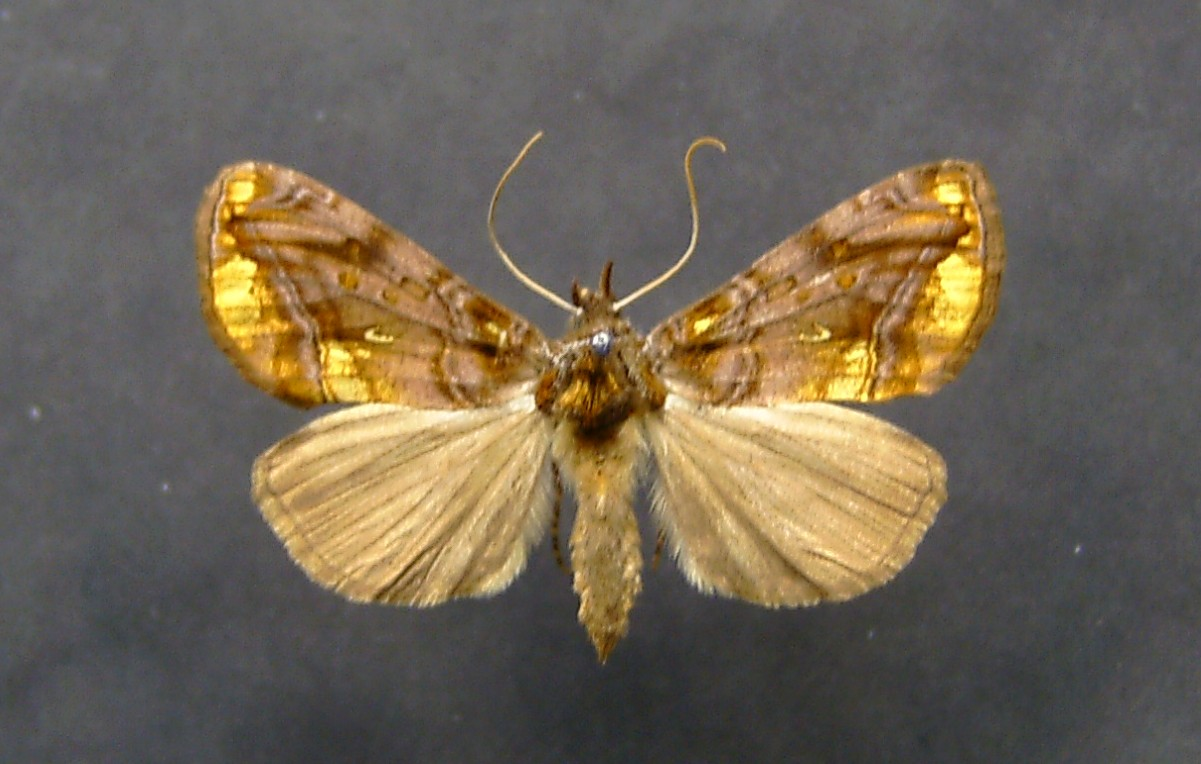
- Lamprotes c-aureum

Scientific classification
- Domain: Eukaryota
- Kingdom: Animalia
- Phylum: Arthropoda
- Class: Insecta
- Order: Lepidoptera
- Superfamily: Noctuoidea
- Family: Noctuidae
- Subfamily: Plusiinae
- Genus: Lamprotes; Reichenbach, 1817

= Lamprotes =

Genus of moths

Lamprotes is a genus of moths of the family Noctuidae.

== Species ==
- Lamprotes c-aureum Knoch, 1781
- Lamprotes mikadina Butler, 1878
