= Chrysanympha =

Scientific classification
- Kingdom: Animalia
- Phylum: Arthropoda
- Class: Insecta
- Order: Lepidoptera
- Superfamily: Noctuoidea
- Family: Noctuidae
- Subfamily: Plusiinae
- Genus: Chrysanympha; Grote, 1896

Genus of moths

Chrysanympha is a genus of moths of the family Noctuidae.

== Species ==
- Chrysanympha formosa Grote, 1865
