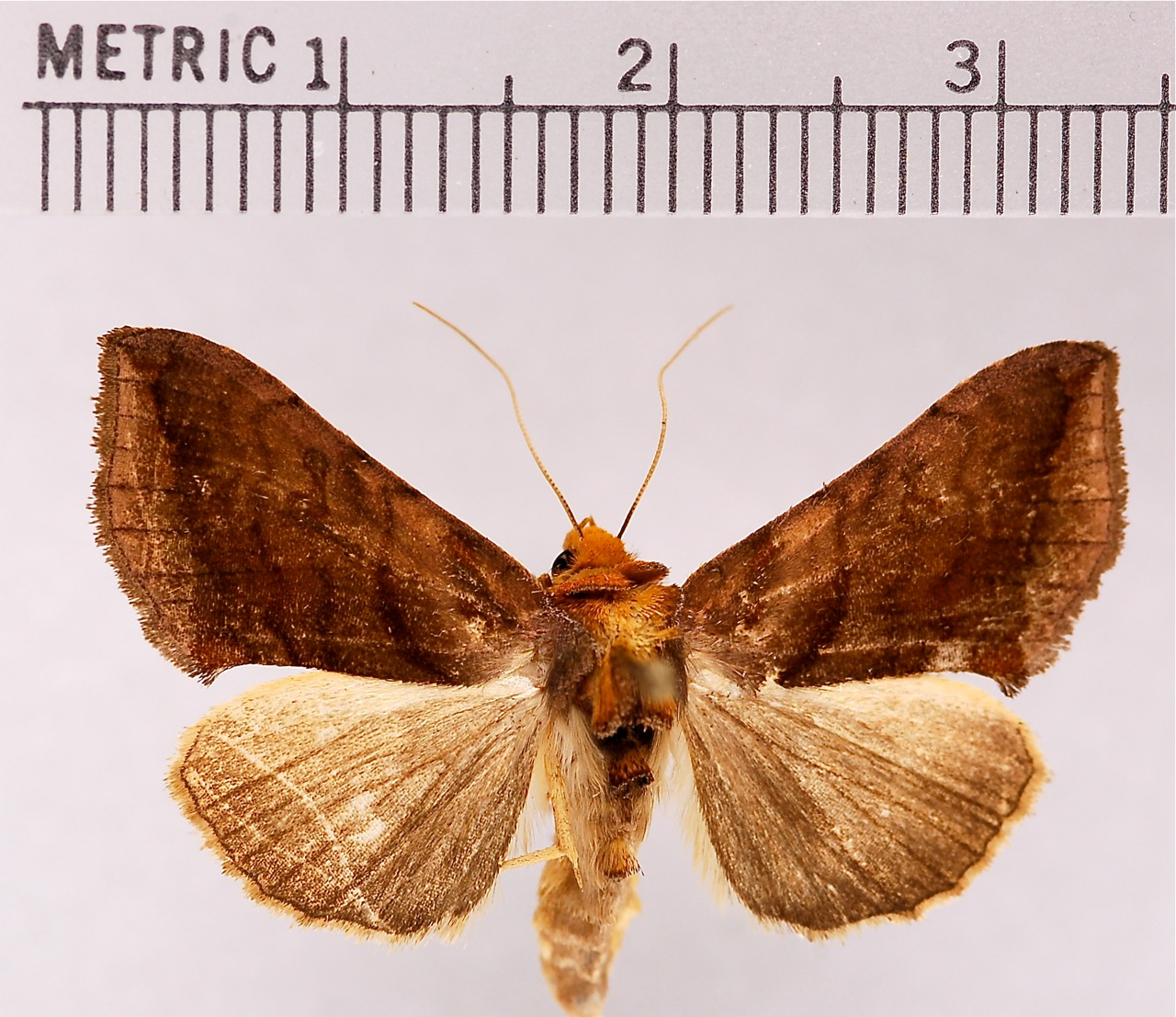
- Allagrapha aerea

Scientific classification
- Domain: Eukaryota
- Kingdom: Animalia
- Phylum: Arthropoda
- Class: Insecta
- Order: Lepidoptera
- Superfamily: Noctuoidea
- Family: Noctuidae
- Subtribe: Autoplusiina
- Genus: Allagrapha; Franclemont, 1964

= Allagrapha =

Genus of moths

Allagrapha is a genus of moths of the family Noctuidae.

== Species ==
- Allagrapha aerea (Hübner, [1803])
