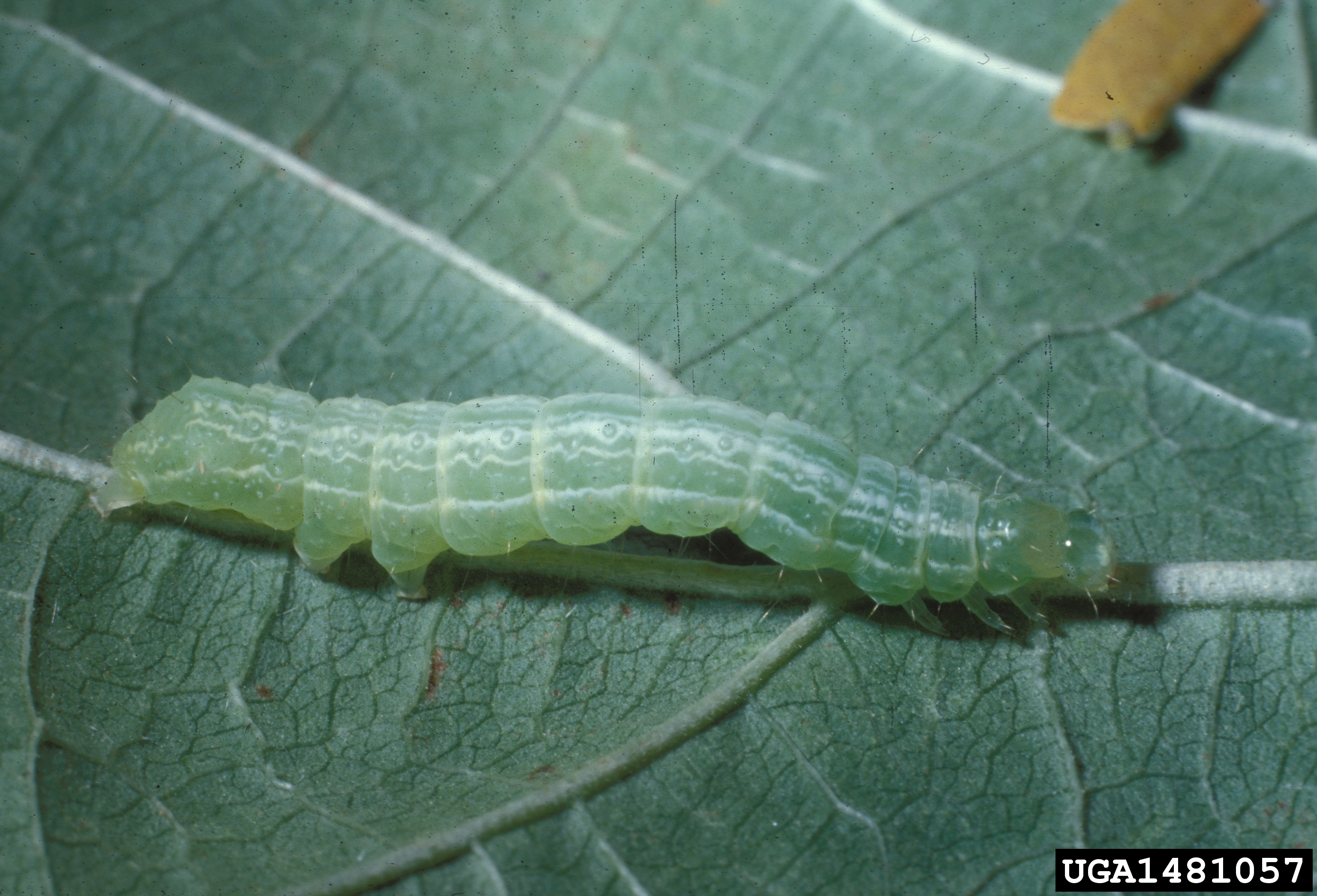
- Autoplusia egena

Scientific classification
- Kingdom: Animalia
- Phylum: Arthropoda
- Clade: Pancrustacea
- Class: Insecta
- Order: Lepidoptera
- Superfamily: Noctuoidea
- Family: Noctuidae
- Subtribe: Autoplusiina
- Genus: Autoplusia; McDunnough, 1944

= Autoplusia =

Genus of moths

Autoplusia is a genus of moths of the family Noctuidae.

== Species ==
- Autoplusia abrota Druce, 1889
- Autoplusia egena Guenée, 1852
- Autoplusia egenoides Franclemont & Todd, 1983
- Autoplusia gammoides Blanchard, 1852
- Autoplusia masoni Schaus, 1894
- Autoplusia olivacea Skinner, 1917
- Autoplusia phocina Hampson, 1913
