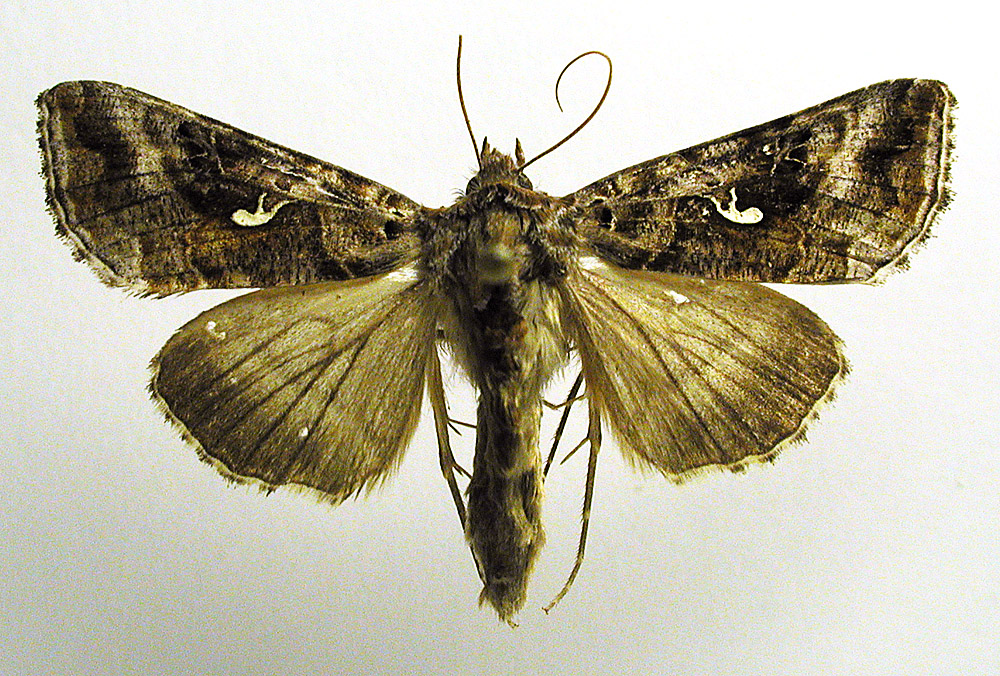

Scientific classification
- Domain: Eukaryota
- Kingdom: Animalia
- Phylum: Arthropoda
- Class: Insecta
- Order: Lepidoptera
- Superfamily: Noctuoidea
- Family: Noctuidae
- Genus: Autographa
- Species: A. buraetica

Binomial name
- Autographa buraetica (Staudinger, 1892)

Synonyms
- Plusia pulchrina var. buraetica Staudinger, 1892

= Autographa buraetica =

Species of moth

Autographa buraetica is a moth of the family Noctuidae. It is found in north and north-eastern Germany, Scandinavia, Poland, Russia (from the Ural to the Pacific coast), Mongolia, Siberia, the Ussuri region, Korea and Japan. It has recently been recorded from Austria. In North America, it is found in Alaska, the Yukon, the Northwest Territories and British Columbia.

The wingspan is 35–42 mm. it is very similar to Autographa pulchrina, which is usually lighter and redder in colour overall. Autographa jota is somewhat larger and usually predominantly pinkish-brown in colour, Autographa mandarina, on the other hand, is usually darker and shows a large gamma sign. In North America, Autographa californica and Autographa pseudogamma resemble buraetica. Because of the similarity to the above-mentioned species, a genital morphological examination must be used for a reliable determination.
