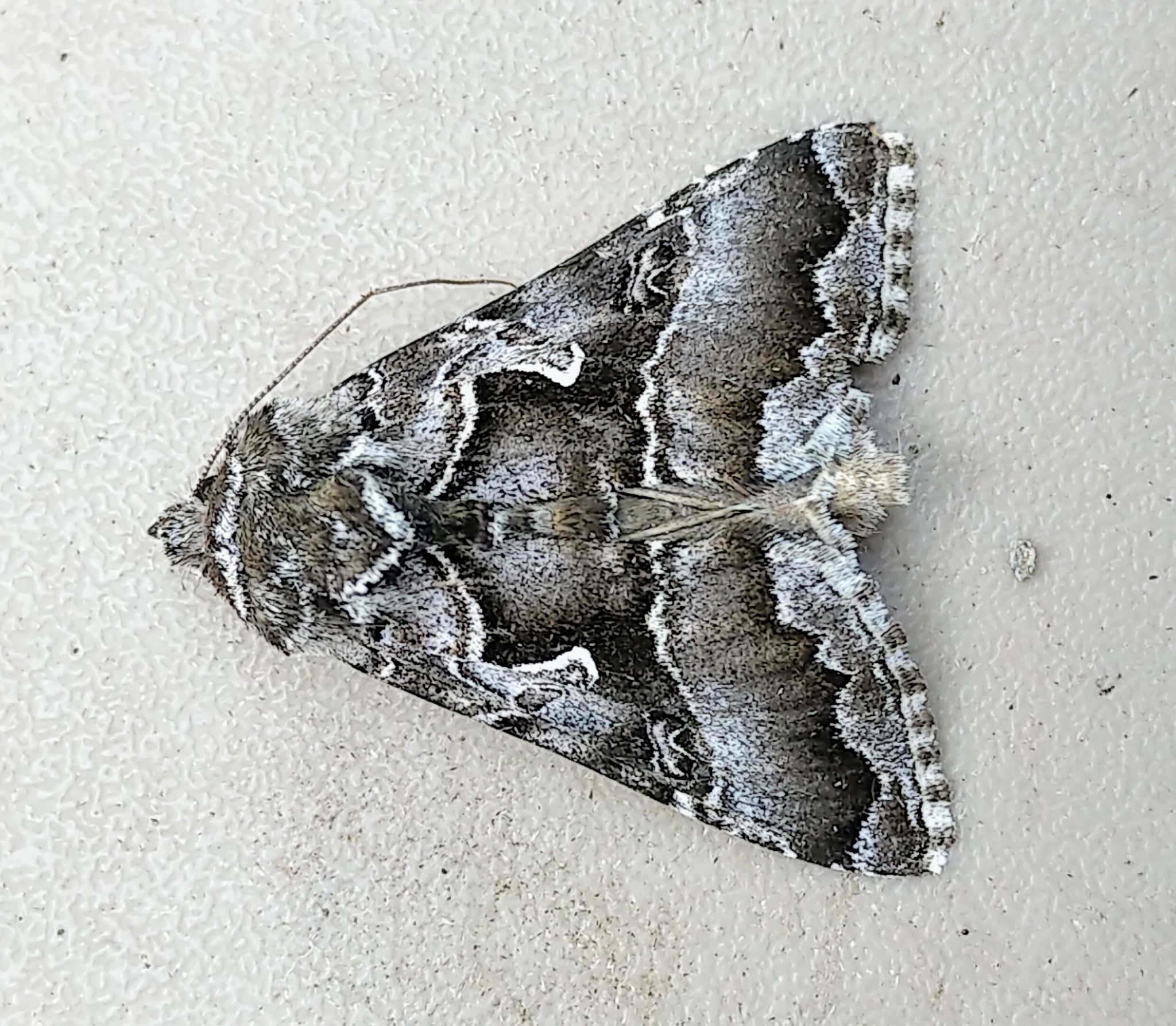

Scientific classification
- Domain: Eukaryota
- Kingdom: Animalia
- Phylum: Arthropoda
- Class: Insecta
- Order: Lepidoptera
- Superfamily: Noctuoidea
- Family: Noctuidae
- Genus: Autographa
- Species: A. v-alba

Binomial name
- Autographa v-alba Ottolengui, 1902

= Autographa v-alba =

White Y mark

Species of moth

Autographa v-alba, the white Y mark, is a species of moth in the family Noctuidae. The species was first described by Rodrigues Ottolengui in 1902. It is found in North America from the foothills of Alberta west almost to the coast of British Columbia, south to southern Washington, north-eastern Oregon, central Idaho, northern Wyoming and central Utah.

The wingspan is 38–40 mm. Adults are on wing in August depending on the location. There is a single generation per year.
