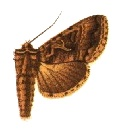

Scientific classification
- Domain: Eukaryota
- Kingdom: Animalia
- Phylum: Arthropoda
- Class: Insecta
- Order: Lepidoptera
- Superfamily: Noctuoidea
- Family: Noctuidae
- Genus: Autographa
- Species: A. rubida

Binomial name
- Autographa rubida Ottolengui, 1902

Synonyms
- Autographa rubidus

= Autographa rubida =

Species of moth

Autographa rubida is a moth of the family Noctuidae first described by Rodrigues Ottolengui in 1902. It is found from Newfoundland west across southern Canada to south-eastern British Columbia, south to Maine, and Minnesota.

The wingspan is about 35 mm. Adults are on wing in June depending on the location. There is a single generation per year.

The larval food plants are unknown, but larvae have been reared on Taraxacum officinale.
