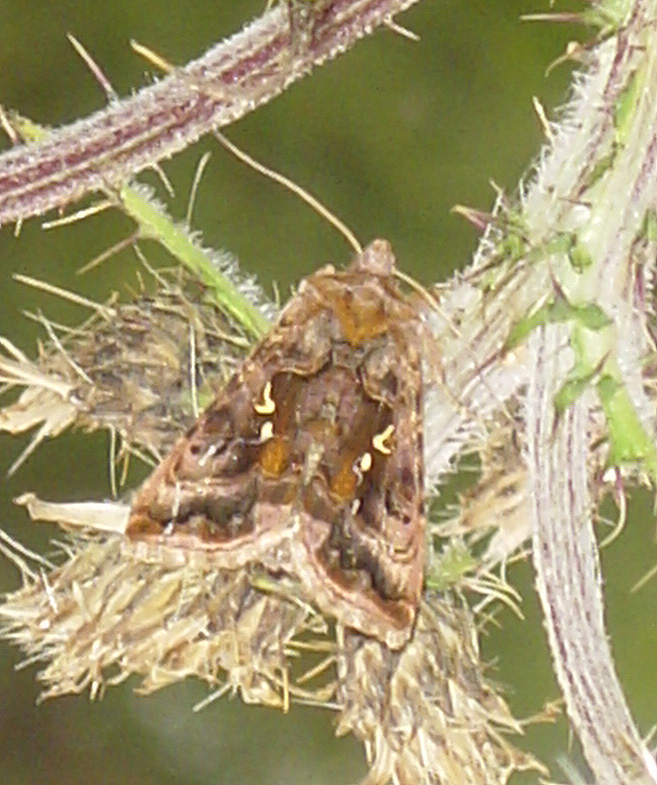

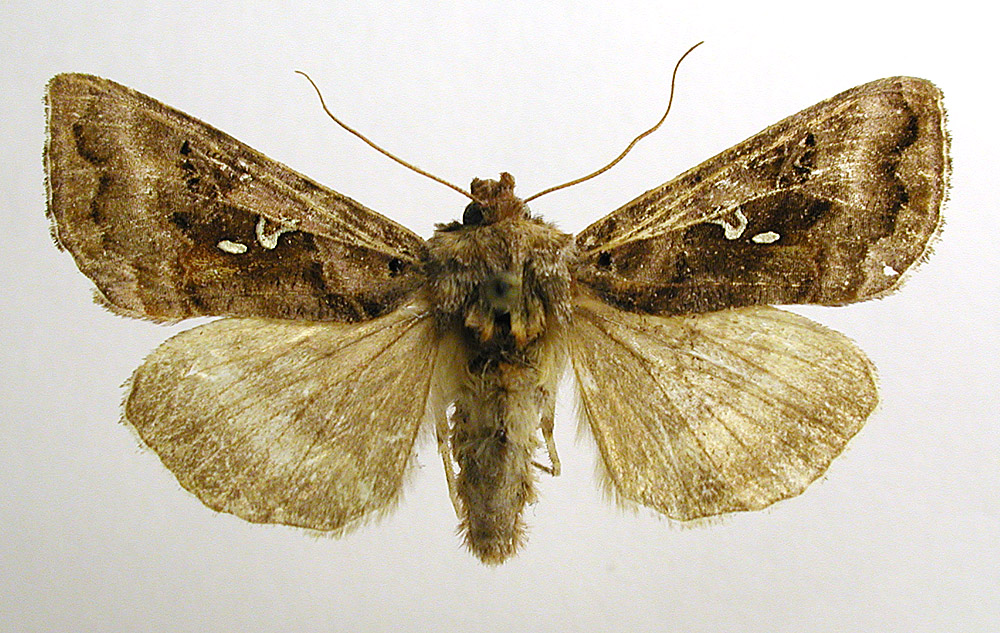

Scientific classification
- Kingdom: Animalia
- Phylum: Arthropoda
- Clade: Pancrustacea
- Class: Insecta
- Order: Lepidoptera
- Superfamily: Noctuoidea
- Family: Noctuidae
- Genus: Autographa
- Species: A. pulchrina

Binomial name
- Autographa pulchrina (Haworth, 1809)

= Autographa pulchrina =

Beautiful golden Y

Species of moth

Autographa pulchrina (beautiful golden Y) is a moth of the family Noctuoidea. It is found in Europe, east to the Urals and the Caucasus, as well as in the Khentii Mountains (Mongolia) and East Siberia.

== Description ==
The wingspan is 35–40 mm. The length of the forewings is 17–20 mm. Forewing fuscous purplish, with the dark suffusion stronger than in iota; inner and outer lines more or less marked with pale yellowish, edged with dark brown;the inner preceded by a brown fascia; median area below middle ferruginous brown, with an orange suffusion beneath externally; reniform stigma partly outlined with pale golden; the two golden spots as in iota; submarginal line suffusedly edged with olive brown, except above anal angle; hindwing as in iota; in the ab. percontatrix Auriv. the two golden spots are confluent; the form gammoides Speyer, from the Baltic provinces and North and Central Germany, is darker, with the purplish tint of forewings stronger and the metallic spots united; — buraetica Stgr. is also a darker, brownish grey form, with stronger golden tinge and conjoined spots, from the Kentei Mts. and E. Siberia [now species Autographa buraetica ]; in the ab. pallida ab. nov. [Warren] from the Engadine the ground colour is whitish.

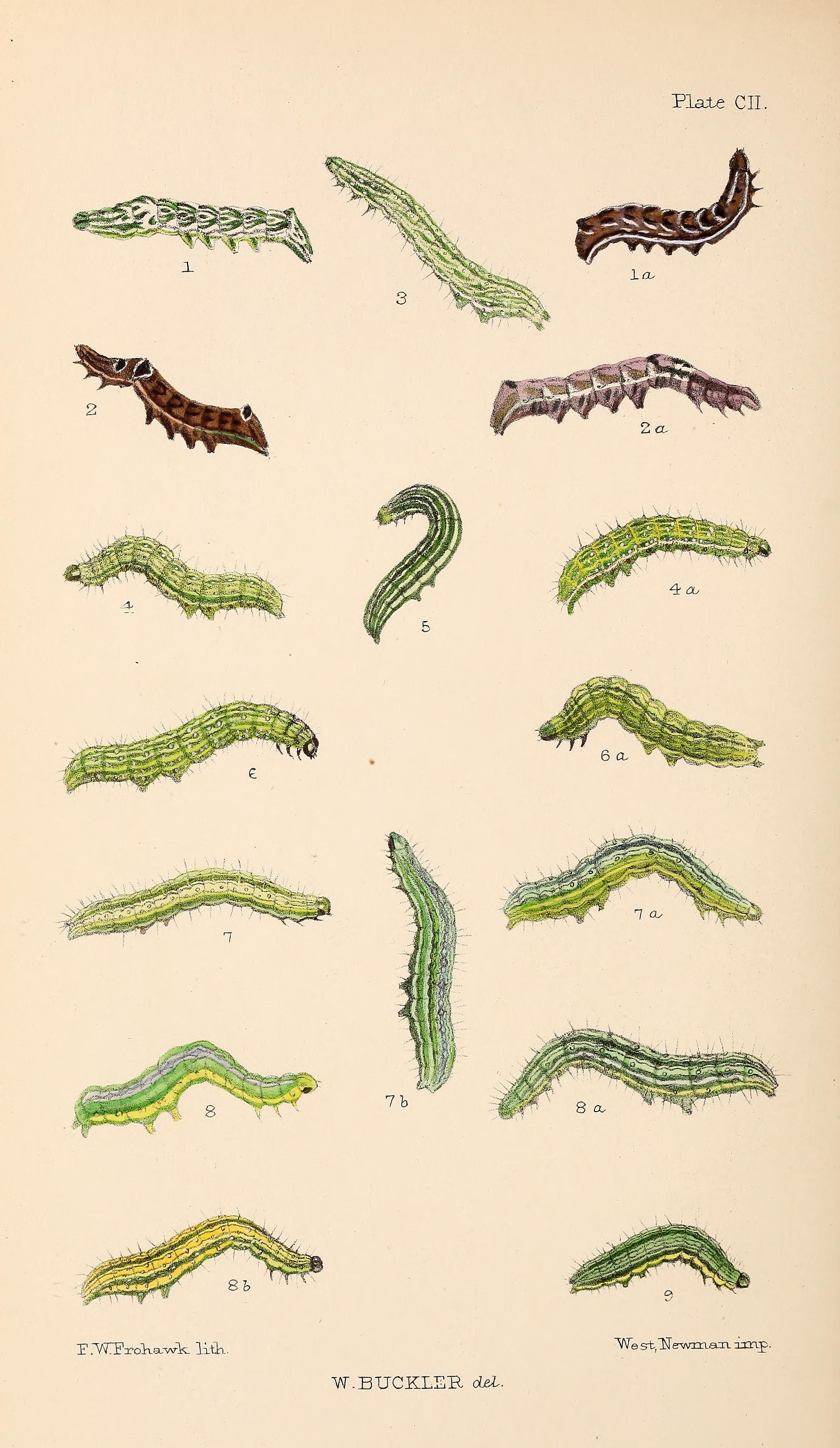
Figs.7, 7a, 7b larvae after last moult

The caterpillars are green and have yellowish white, slightly wavy lateral stripes. The head is green and blackish bordered. The pupa is black.

== Biology ==
The moth flies in one or two generations in from May to June and August to September in case of a second generation.

The larvae feed on low plants such as nettle, honeysuckle, Stachys sylvatica and Jacobaea vulgaris.

== Notes ==
1. The flight season refers to Belgium and The Netherlands. This may vary in other parts of the range.
