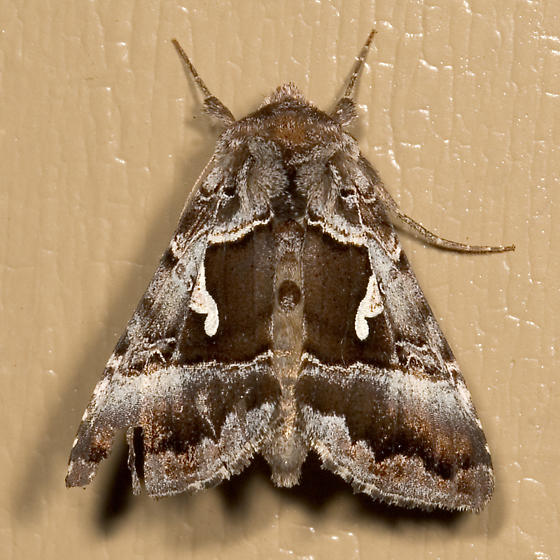

Scientific classification
- Domain: Eukaryota
- Kingdom: Animalia
- Phylum: Arthropoda
- Class: Insecta
- Order: Lepidoptera
- Superfamily: Noctuoidea
- Family: Noctuidae
- Genus: Autographa
- Species: A. speciosa

Binomial name
- Autographa speciosa Ottolengui, 1902

= Autographa speciosa =

Species of moth

Autographa speciosa is a moth of the family Noctuidae. It is found in western Oregon, southern Vancouver Island and the Sierra Nevada range of California.

The wingspan is about 38 mm. Adults are on wing in midsummer.
