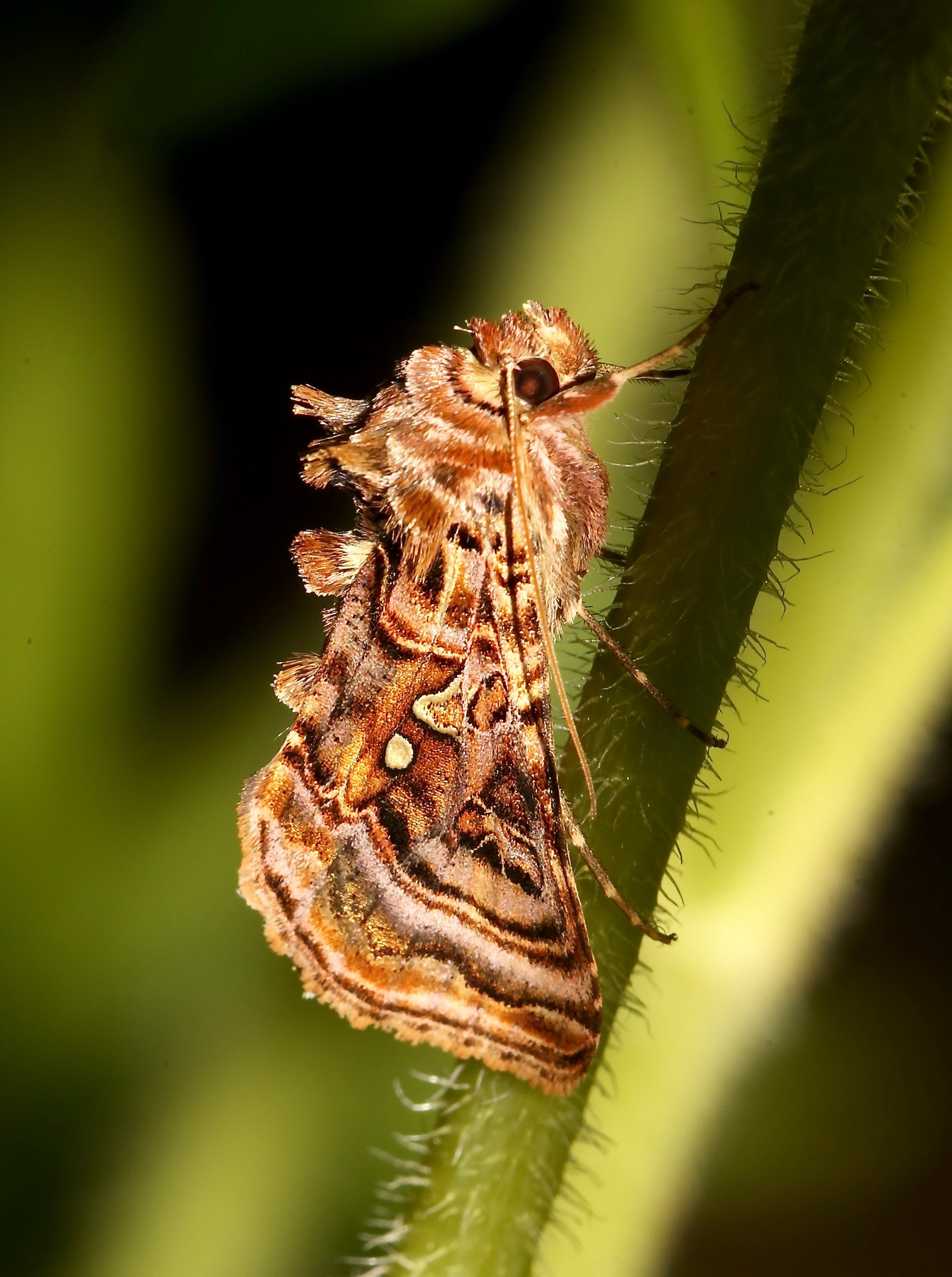

Scientific classification
- Kingdom: Animalia
- Phylum: Arthropoda
- Class: Insecta
- Order: Lepidoptera
- Superfamily: Noctuoidea
- Family: Noctuidae
- Genus: Autographa
- Species: A. mappa

Binomial name
- Autographa mappa Grote & Robinson, 1868

Synonyms
- Plusia mappa

= Autographa mappa =

Wavy chestnut Y

Species of moth

Autographa mappa, the wavy chestnut Y, is a moth of the family Noctuidae. The species was first described by Augustus Radcliffe Grote and Coleman Townsend Robinson in 1868. It is found in North America from Newfoundland west across the wooded portions of Canada to Vancouver Island, south in the east to Maine, New Hampshire and Wisconsin, and in the western mountains south to Colorado and Oregon.

The wingspan is 35–40 mm. Adults are on wing from June to August depending on the location. There is one generation per year.

The larvae feed on Urtica and Vaccinium species.
