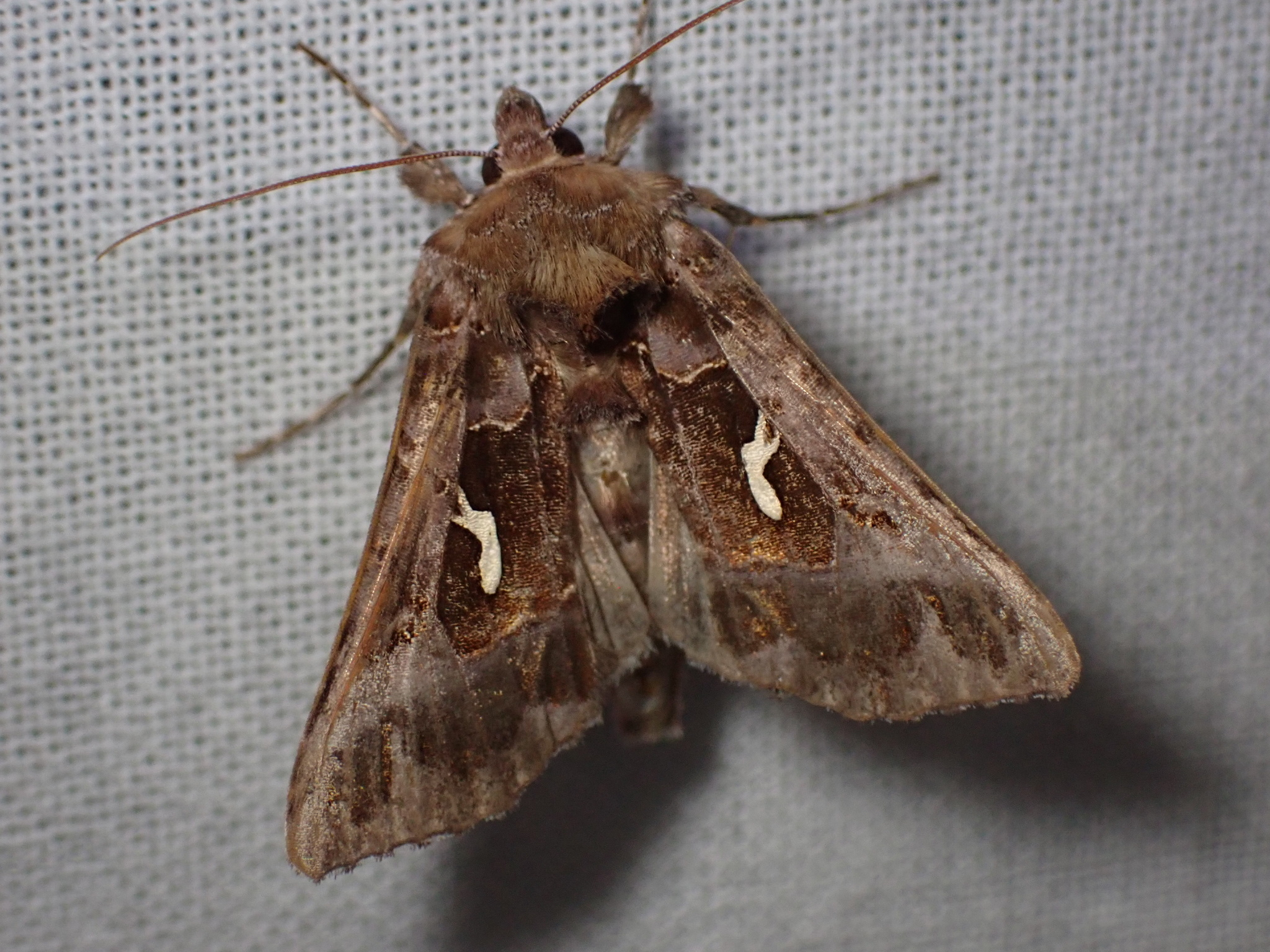

Scientific classification
- Kingdom: Animalia
- Phylum: Arthropoda
- Clade: Pancrustacea
- Class: Insecta
- Order: Lepidoptera
- Superfamily: Noctuoidea
- Family: Noctuidae
- Genus: Autographa
- Species: A. labrosa

Binomial name
- Autographa labrosa (Grote, 1875)

= Autographa labrosa =

Species of moth

Autographa labrosa is a species of looper moth in the family Noctuidae. It is found in North America.

The MONA or Hodges number for Autographa labrosa is 8920.
