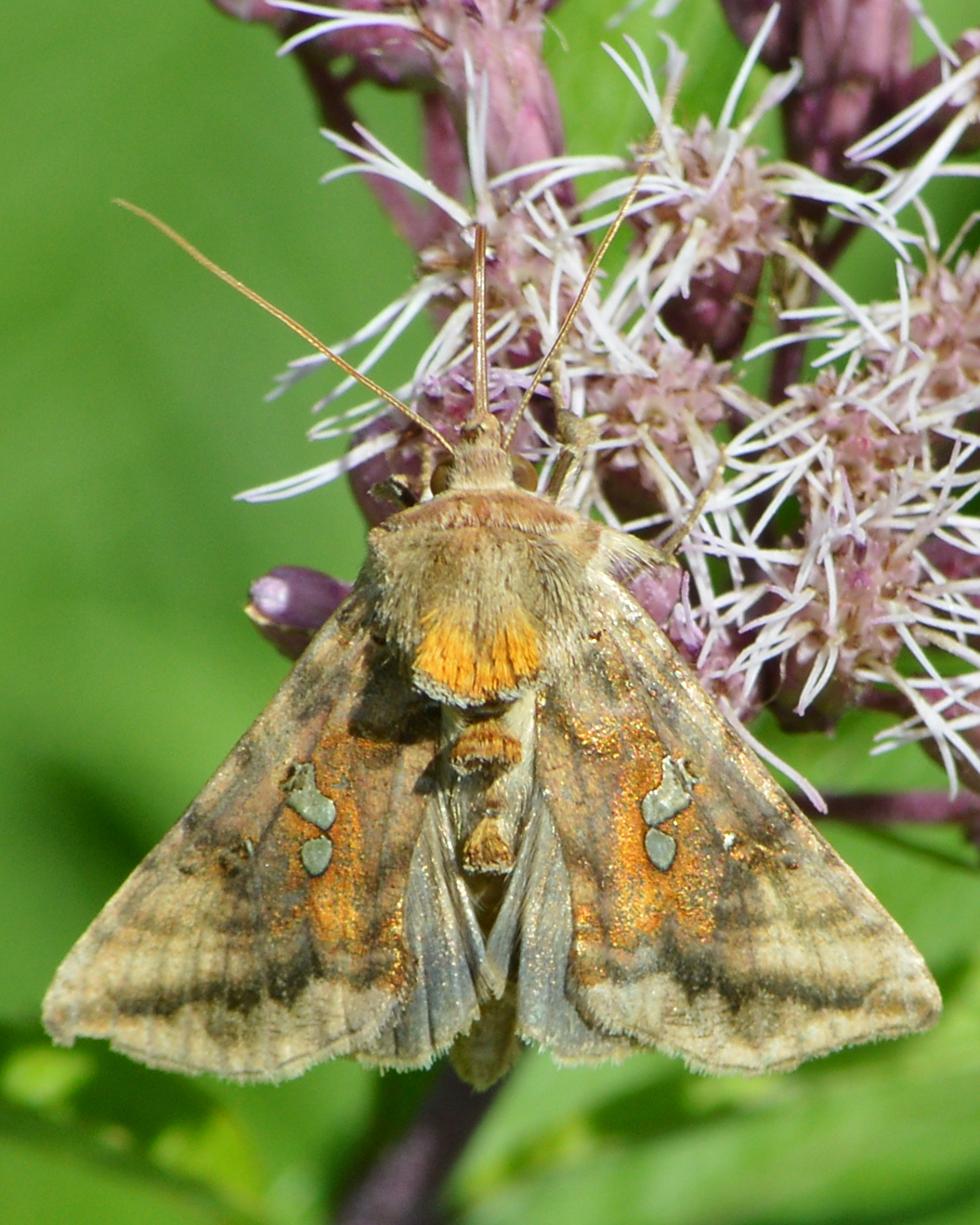

Scientific classification
- Domain: Eukaryota
- Kingdom: Animalia
- Phylum: Arthropoda
- Class: Insecta
- Order: Lepidoptera
- Superfamily: Noctuoidea
- Family: Noctuidae
- Genus: Autographa
- Species: A. bimaculata

Binomial name
- Autographa bimaculata Stephens, 1830

Synonyms
- Megalographa bimaculata (Stephens, 1830); Plusia bimaculata; Plusia u-brevis

= Autographa bimaculata =

Species of moth

Autographa bimaculata, the two-spotted looper moth, twin gold spot or double-spotted spangle, is a moth of the family Noctuidae. The species was first described by James Francis Stephens in 1830. It is found in North America from Newfoundland west, just short of the coast of British Columbia, north to the Northwest Territories and south to New Mexico in the west and Pennsylvania and Long Island in the east.

The wingspan is 37–40 mm. Adults are on wing from July to August depending on the location. There is one generation per year.

The larvae feed on Taraxacum, but also accept Plantago and Urtica dioica.
