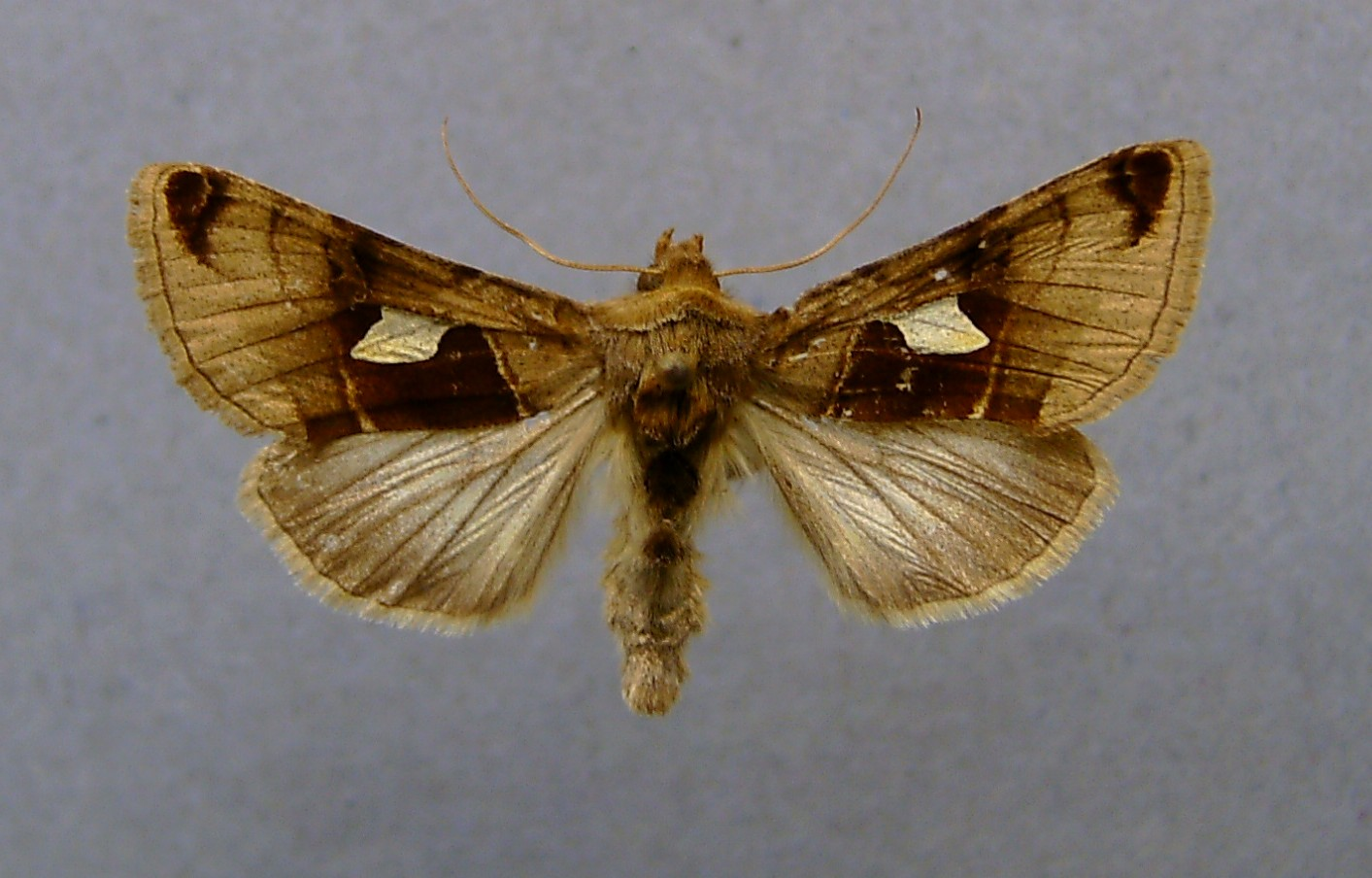

Scientific classification
- Domain: Eukaryota
- Kingdom: Animalia
- Phylum: Arthropoda
- Class: Insecta
- Order: Lepidoptera
- Superfamily: Noctuoidea
- Family: Noctuidae
- Genus: Autographa
- Species: A. aemula

Binomial name
- Autographa aemula (Denis & Schiffermüller, 1775)

Synonyms
- Noctua lumina; Phalaena chrysomelas

= Autographa aemula =

Species of moth

Autographa aemula is a moth of the family Noctuidae. It is found in mountainous areas, more specifically in the Alps, Southern France, Northeast Turkey and the Caucasus.

The wingspan is 36–42 mm. The moth flies from June to August depending on the location.

The larvae feed on Leontodon, Hieracium, Plantago and Trifolium species.
