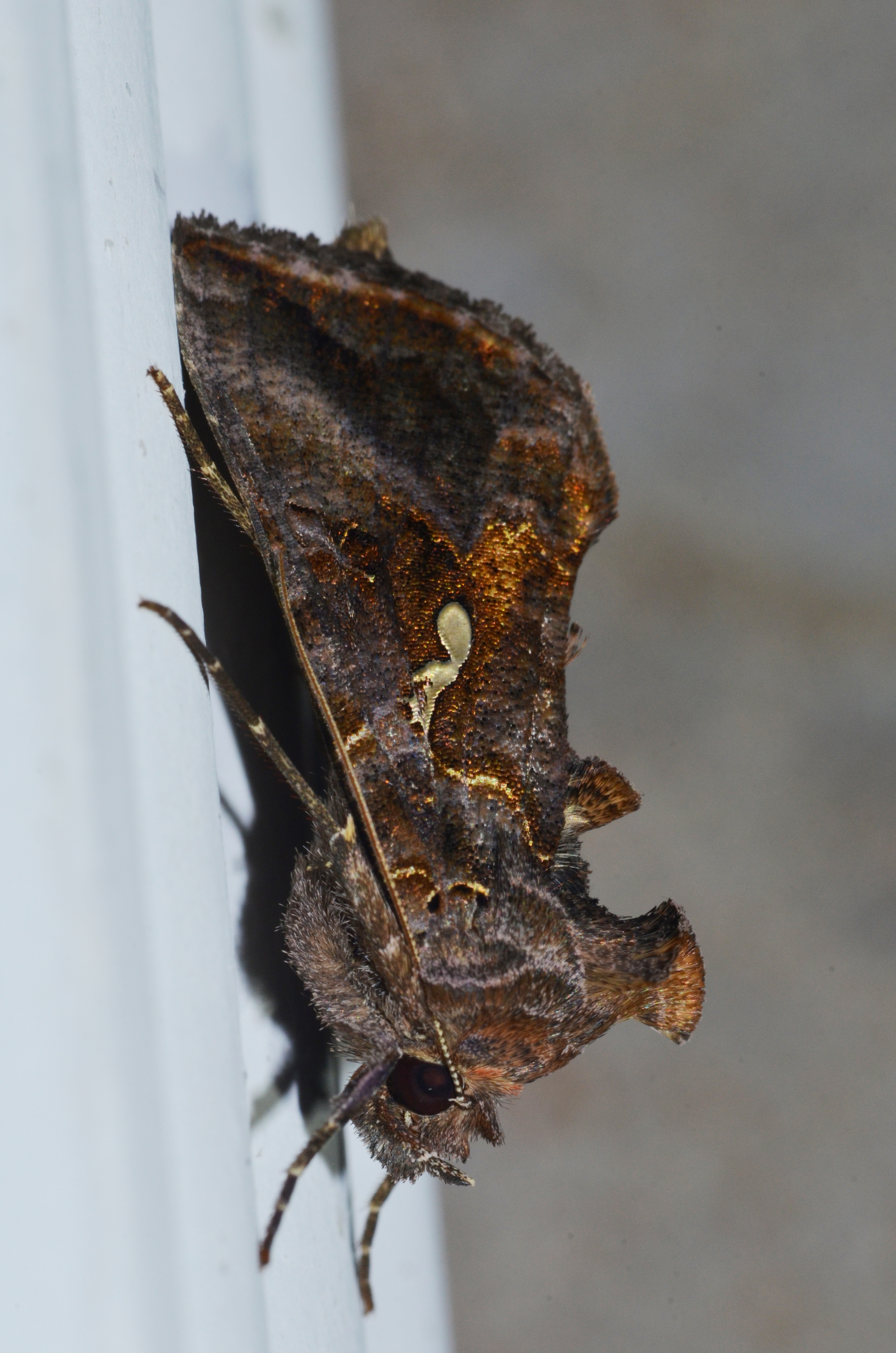

Scientific classification
- Kingdom: Animalia
- Phylum: Arthropoda
- Clade: Pancrustacea
- Class: Insecta
- Order: Lepidoptera
- Superfamily: Noctuoidea
- Family: Noctuidae
- Genus: Autographa
- Species: A. precationis

Binomial name
- Autographa precationis (Guenée, 1852)

Synonyms
- Plusia precationis

= Autographa precationis =

Common looper moth

Species of moth

Autographa precationis (common looper moth) is a moth of the family Noctuidae. It is found in eastern and central North America.

The wingspan is 30–38 mm. Adults are on wing from April to October depending on the location. There are three or more generations per year.

The larvae feed on various forbs, including Apiaceae, Asteraceae, Brassicaceae, Chenopodiaceae, Convolvulaceae, Fabaceae, Malvaceae, Plantaginaceae and Verbenaceae species.

== Identification ==
The common looper is thought to have recently moved into the greater niche provided by more soybean planting in its range, with larvae observed in the wild feeding on soybean plants in addition to their usual fare. Notably, their digestibility and efficiency of food utilization for soybeans was not as high as with Pseudoplusia includens, suggesting host plant preference for common loopers is slightly different. Visually, the two species are strikingly similar, so it is easy to confuse the two, but notably the silver spots on the wings of the Common Looper are usually conjoined, while the spots on the wings of P. includens are separated, and their wings are shinier than those of A. precationis. Larvae of this species have 21–23 crochets per proleg, and are bright green, with a small black marks (false eyes) on each side of the head.

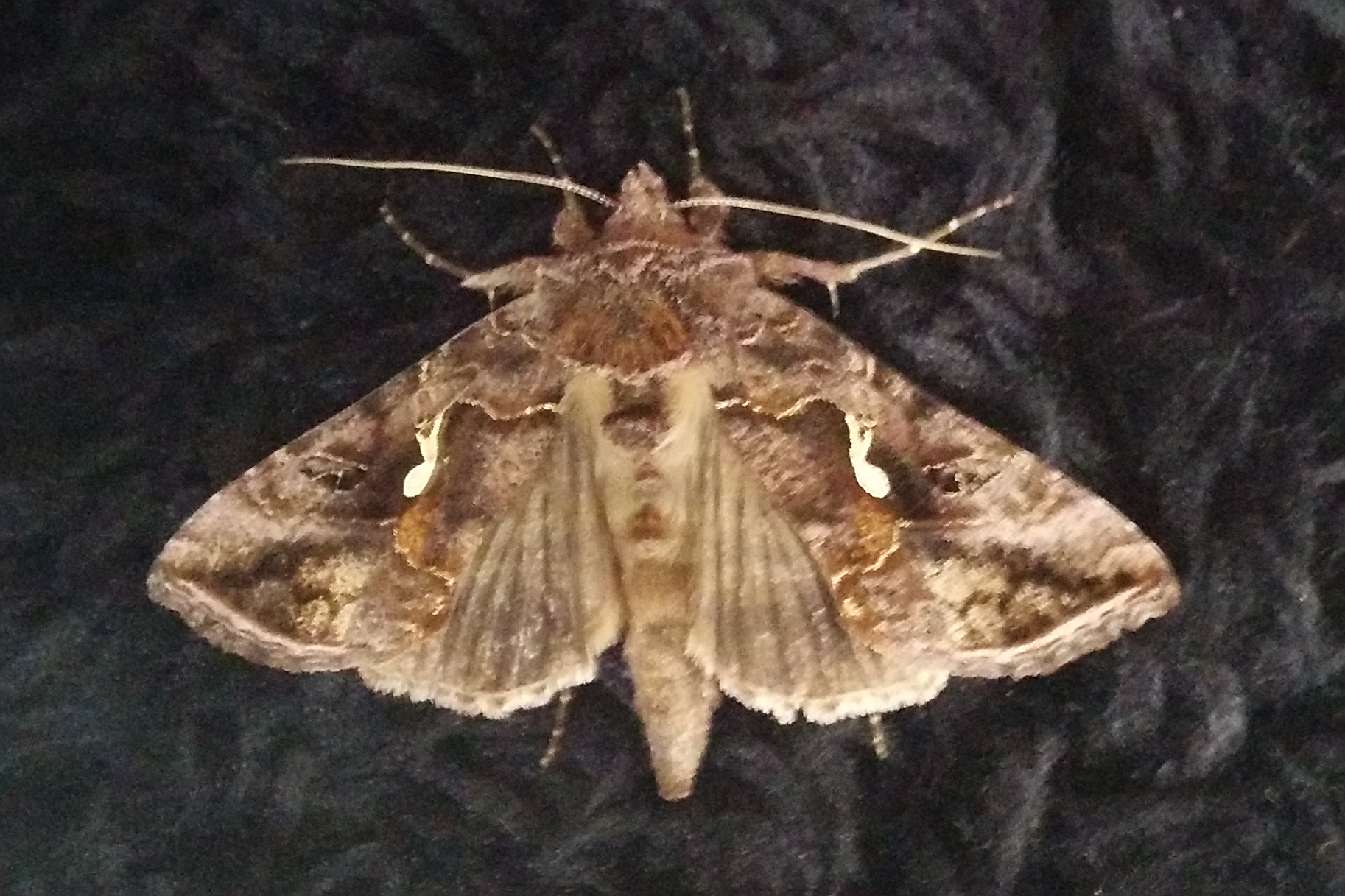
Common looper moth with its wings spread.
