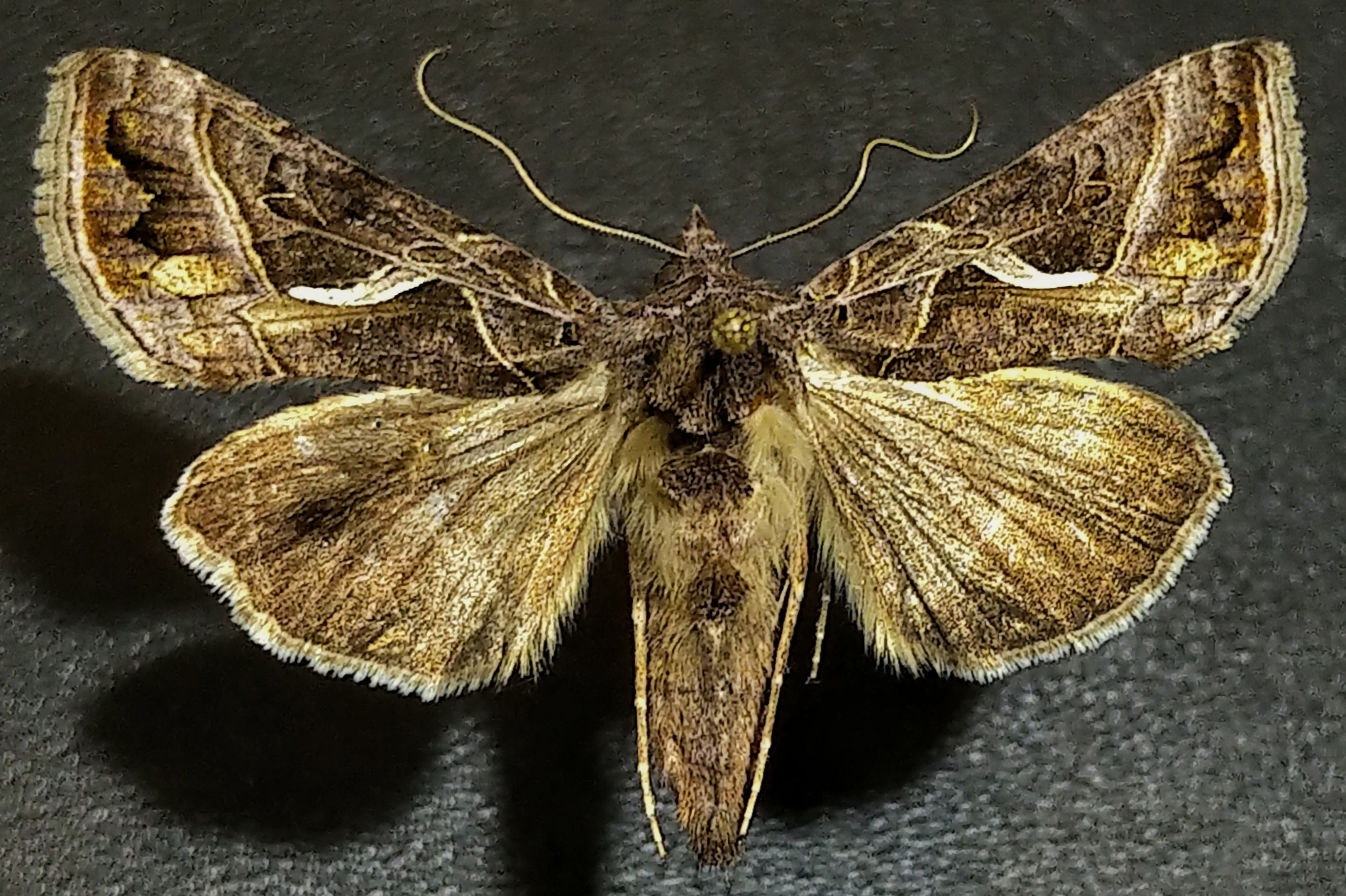

Scientific classification
- Kingdom: Animalia
- Phylum: Arthropoda
- Clade: Pancrustacea
- Class: Insecta
- Order: Lepidoptera
- Superfamily: Noctuoidea
- Family: Noctuidae
- Genus: Autographa
- Species: A. flagellum

Binomial name
- Autographa flagellum Walker, 1858

Synonyms
- Plusia flagellum; Plusia monodon; Plusia insolita

= Autographa flagellum =

Silver whip

Species of moth

Autographa flagellum, the silver whip, is a moth of the family Noctuidae. The species was first described by Francis Walker in 1858. It is found in North America from Newfoundland west across southern Canada to south-eastern British Columbia, south in the east to Maine, Michigan and Wisconsin. There are isolated reports from further south (Pennsylvania and Colorado).

The wingspan is 35–40 mm. Adults are on wing from June to August depending on the location. There is one generation per year.

The larvae feed on Liatris and Helianthus species.
