= Autographa pasiphaeia =

Scientific classification
- Kingdom: Animalia
- Phylum: Arthropoda
- Class: Insecta
- Order: Lepidoptera
- Superfamily: Noctuoidea
- Family: Noctuidae
- Genus: Autographa
- Species: A. pasiphaeia

Binomial name
- Autographa pasiphaeia (Grote, 1873)

Species of moth

Autographa pasiphaeia is a species of looper moth in the family Noctuidae. It is found in North America.

The MONA or Hodges number for Autographa pasiphaeia is 8915.
