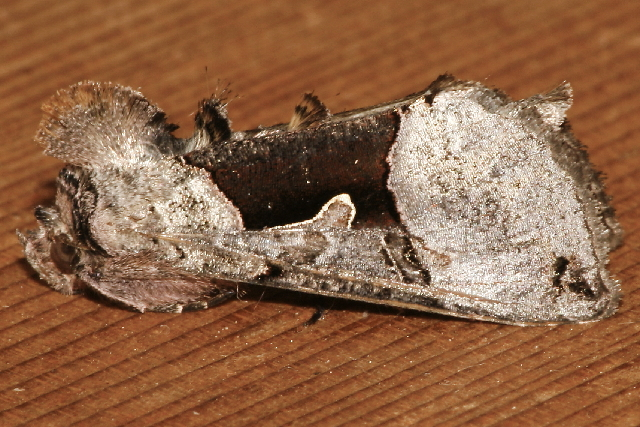

Scientific classification
- Kingdom: Animalia
- Phylum: Arthropoda
- Class: Insecta
- Order: Lepidoptera
- Superfamily: Noctuoidea
- Family: Noctuidae
- Genus: Autographa
- Species: A. ampla

Binomial name
- Autographa ampla Walker, 1858

Synonyms
- Plusia ampla; Plusia alterna

= Autographa ampla =

Species of moth

Autographa ampla, the large looper moth, raspberry looper, brown-patched looper or broken-banded Y, is a moth of the family Noctuidae. The species was first described by Francis Walker in 1858. It is found in North America from Newfoundland west to the Alaska panhandle, south to central California, Arizona and New Mexico in the west and North Carolina in the east.

The wingspan is 38–42 mm. Adults are on wing from June to August depending on the location. There is one generation per year.
