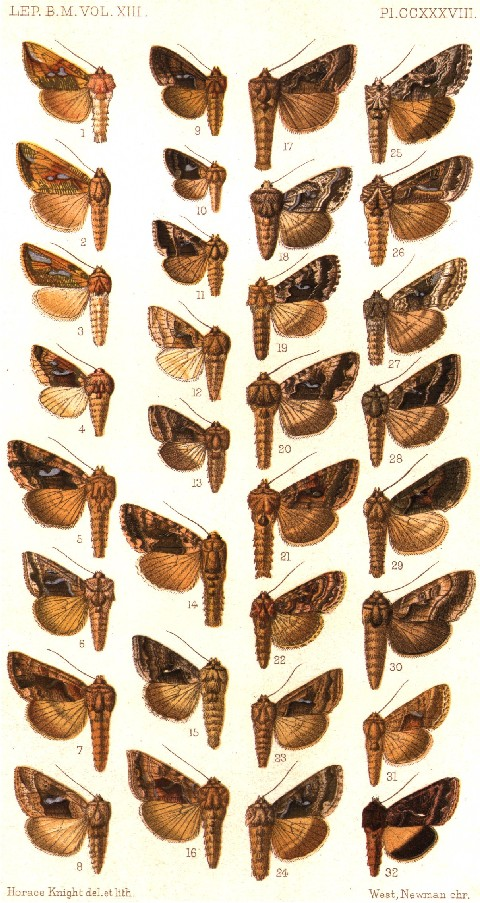

Scientific classification
- Kingdom: Animalia
- Phylum: Arthropoda
- Clade: Pancrustacea
- Class: Insecta
- Order: Lepidoptera
- Superfamily: Noctuoidea
- Family: Noctuidae
- Genus: Autographa
- Species: A. sansoni

Binomial name
- Autographa sansoni Dod, 1910

= Autographa sansoni =

Alberta beauty

Species of moth

Autographa sansoni, the Alberta beauty, is a moth of the family Noctuidae. The species was first described by F. H. Wolley Dod in 1910. It is found in the western mountains of North America, from Alaska south to Oregon, Idaho and Arizona. Occurring mainly in the Pacific Northwest, it thrives in mid-to-high elevation conifer forest habitat, as well as some areas of coastal rain forest in the Coast range. However, it is also found in a non-contiguous range in sub-alpine forest in the Rocky Mountains, ranging from Alberta in the north, to New Mexico in the south. The wingspan of an adult ranges between 34 and 36 mm. It is widespread, and a relatively common species.

== Behaviour ==
Adults are on the wing from June to July, depending on the location. Adult females of the species lay a single brood of eggs each year. The moth is nocturnal, and will be attracted to lights. The plants upon which the moths' larvae feed are currently unknown.

== Description ==
The two forewings are a dark shade of brown, whilst both hindwings are a much lighter shade of yellow, tipped with a wide marginal band of a darker yellow-brown shade. The forewing culminates in a rounded point, while the hindwing is more curved. There is also a curved white mark, curving from the anterior edge towards the outer edge. The species is identifiable through these characteristics, as well as the possession of a curved stigma. While the species shows some sexual dimorphism, the sexes are still hard to distinguish. The antenna of the male is filiform. The thorax is a darker shade than the abdomen, although both shades are intermediary to those of the wings.
