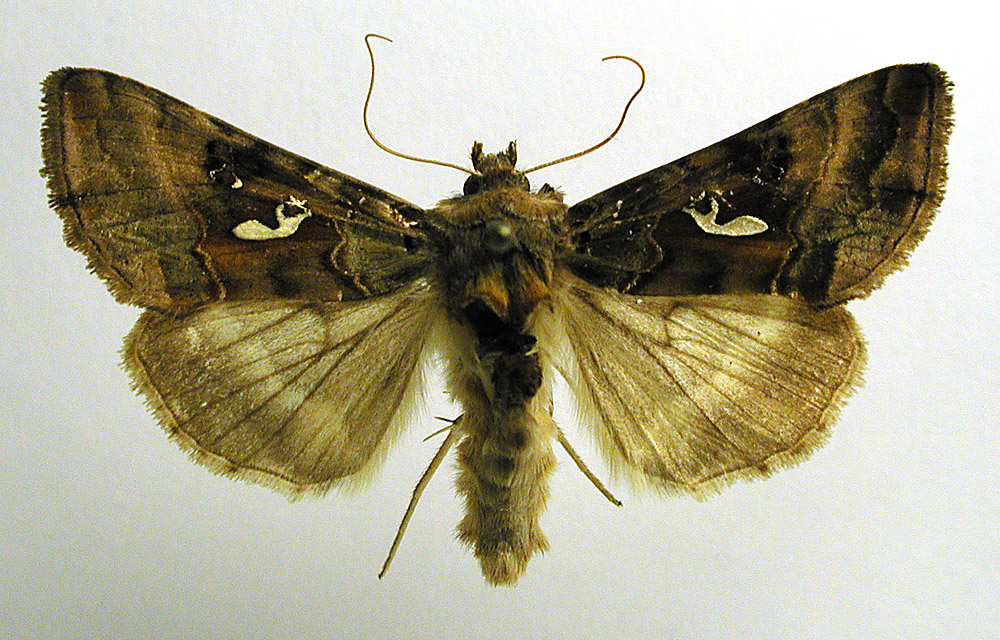

Scientific classification
- Domain: Eukaryota
- Kingdom: Animalia
- Phylum: Arthropoda
- Class: Insecta
- Order: Lepidoptera
- Superfamily: Noctuoidea
- Family: Noctuidae
- Genus: Autographa
- Species: A. macrogamma

Binomial name
- Autographa macrogamma (Eversmann, 1842)

Synonyms
- Plusia macrogamma Eversmann, 1842; Plusia sevastina Freyer, 1845

= Autographa macrogamma =

Species of moth

Autographa macrogamma is a moth of the family Noctuidae. It is found from Fennoscandia, to the northern parts of European Russia, Siberia and Mongolia.

The wingspan is 36–42 mm. Adults are on wing from the end of June to beginning of August.

The larvae feed on Trollius europaeus and Sorbus aucuparia.
