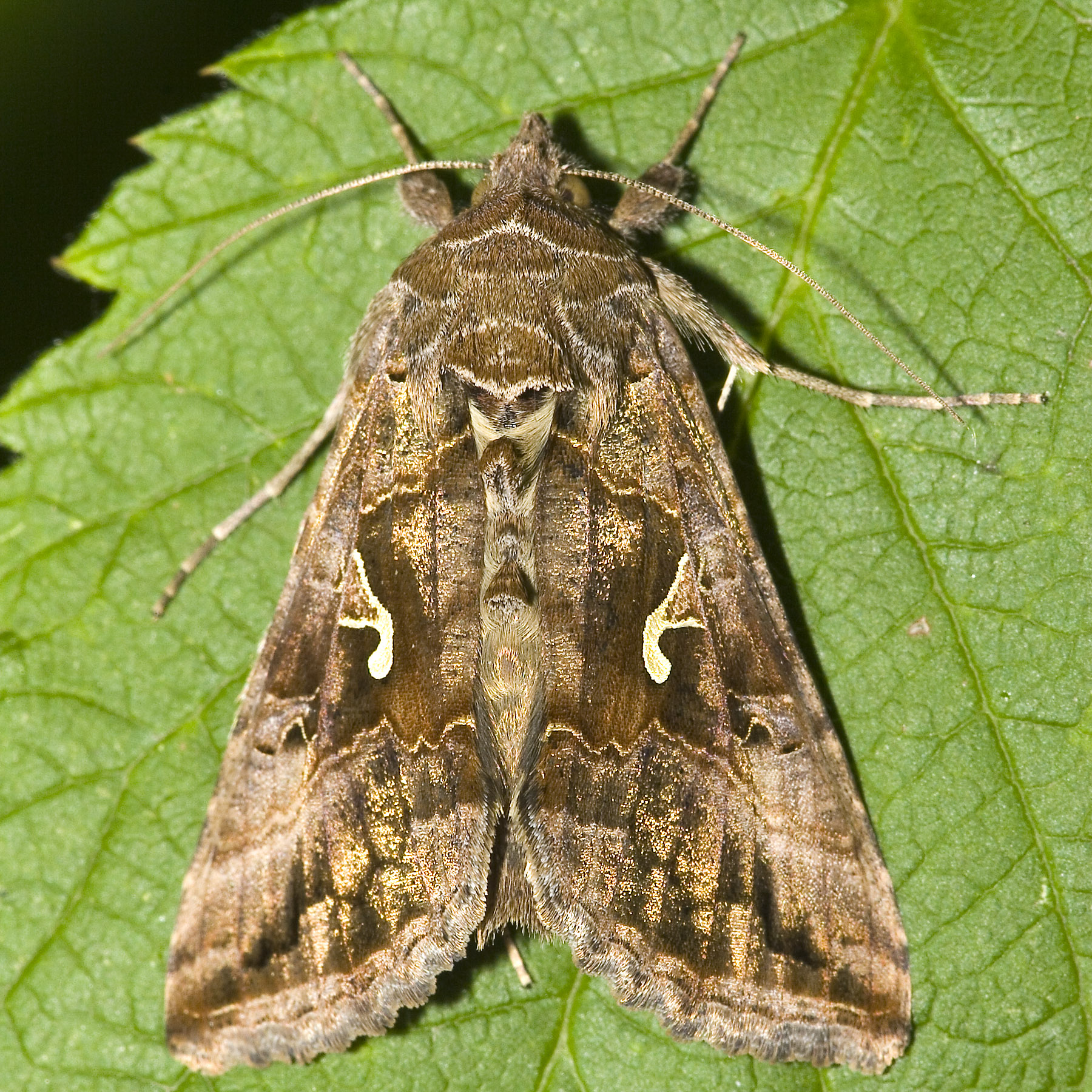

Scientific classification
- Kingdom: Animalia
- Phylum: Arthropoda
- Clade: Pancrustacea
- Class: Insecta
- Order: Lepidoptera
- Superfamily: Noctuoidea
- Family: Noctuidae
- Genus: Autographa
- Species: A. gamma

Binomial name
- Autographa gamma (Linnaeus, 1758)

= Silver Y =

Species of moth

The silver Y (Autographa gamma) is a migratory moth of the family Noctuidae which is named for the silvery Y-shaped mark on each of its forewings. The species is widespread throughout most of the palearctic.

== Description ==
The silver Y is a medium-sized moth with a wingspan described in the range of 30-45 mm.

The wings are intricately patterned with various shades of brown and grey serving as camouflage.

In the centre of each forewing there is a silver-coloured mark shaped like a lower case Y (y) or a lower case Greek letter gamma (γ). There are several different forms with varying colours depending on the climate in which the larvae grow.

=== Technical description and variation ===
P. gamma Forewing purplish grey, with darker suffusion in places; the lines pale silvery edged on both sides with dark fuscous, the outer line indented on vein 2 and submedian fold, as in circumflexa; the oblique orbicular and the reniform conversely oblique and constricted in middle, both edged with silvery: the median area below middle blackish, containing a silvery gamma; the subterminal dentate and indented, preceded by a darker shade; hindwing brownish grey with darker veins and a broad blackish terminal border: aberrations due to difference in ground colour are ab. pallida Tutt, in which the ground colour is whitish grey, with the markings appearing darker and more sharply defined; ab. rufescens Tutt where it is yellowish red, with the gamma mark pale golden, also the lines and edges of stigmata, and the whole underside reddish: and ab. nigricans Spul., in which the whole forewing up to the pale terminal space is violet black brown; in the ab. purpurissa ab. nov. (65a) the ground colour is deep olive brown; the inner and outer lines violet, the latter double; subterminal line lustrous violet, irregularly waved and below the middle forming a strong W-shaped mark; the gamma mark is pale golden, and the edges of the dark stigmata are, like the inner line, finely lustrous; a pale violet terminal stripe before termen; hindwing bronzy brownish, with broad dark terminal border. The example from which this description was made, now in the Tring Museum, was taken in Sussex, on the South Coast of England, and is referred to by Tutt in British Noctuae, Vol. IV, p. 32; lastly, the form gammina Stgr., from Syria and Pontus, is only half as large as typical gamma, with more definitely marked forewings. Larva pale green, with fine whitish or yellowish, partly double, lines; a straight yellowish lateral line above the white black-ringed spiracles.

== Distribution ==
The species is widespread across Europe and over almost all the Palearctic including North Africa. It is resident in the south of its range and adults fly almost throughout the year. In spring variable numbers migrate north reaching as far as Iceland, Greenland, and Finland. A second wave of migrants arrives in the summer. In central Europe and the British Isles adults are present in significant numbers from May onwards with numbers dwindling in late autumn as they are killed off by frosts. Some individuals fly south again to winter around the Mediterranean and Black seas.

== Life cycle ==
Silver Y moths can produce two or three generations in a year with a fourth generation when conditions are particularly good. The eggs are laid on the upper or lower surface of leaves. They are whitish in colour and hemispherical in shape with deep ribbing. They hatch after three to four days (longer in cool conditions).

The adults fly from late spring to autumn.

The larvae are about 30 mm long, have three pairs of prolegs and are usually green with whitish markings. They feed on a wide variety of low-growing plants and have been recorded on over 200 different species sCloveruch as Urtica dioica, clover, and crops such as the garden pea (Pisum sativum), sugar beet (Beta vulgaris), and cabbage (Brassica oleracea).

The pupa is green at first, gradually darkening to black. The adults mate one or two days after emerging from the pupa and start laying eggs one to five days later. They die three to nineteen days after emergence.

== Gallery ==
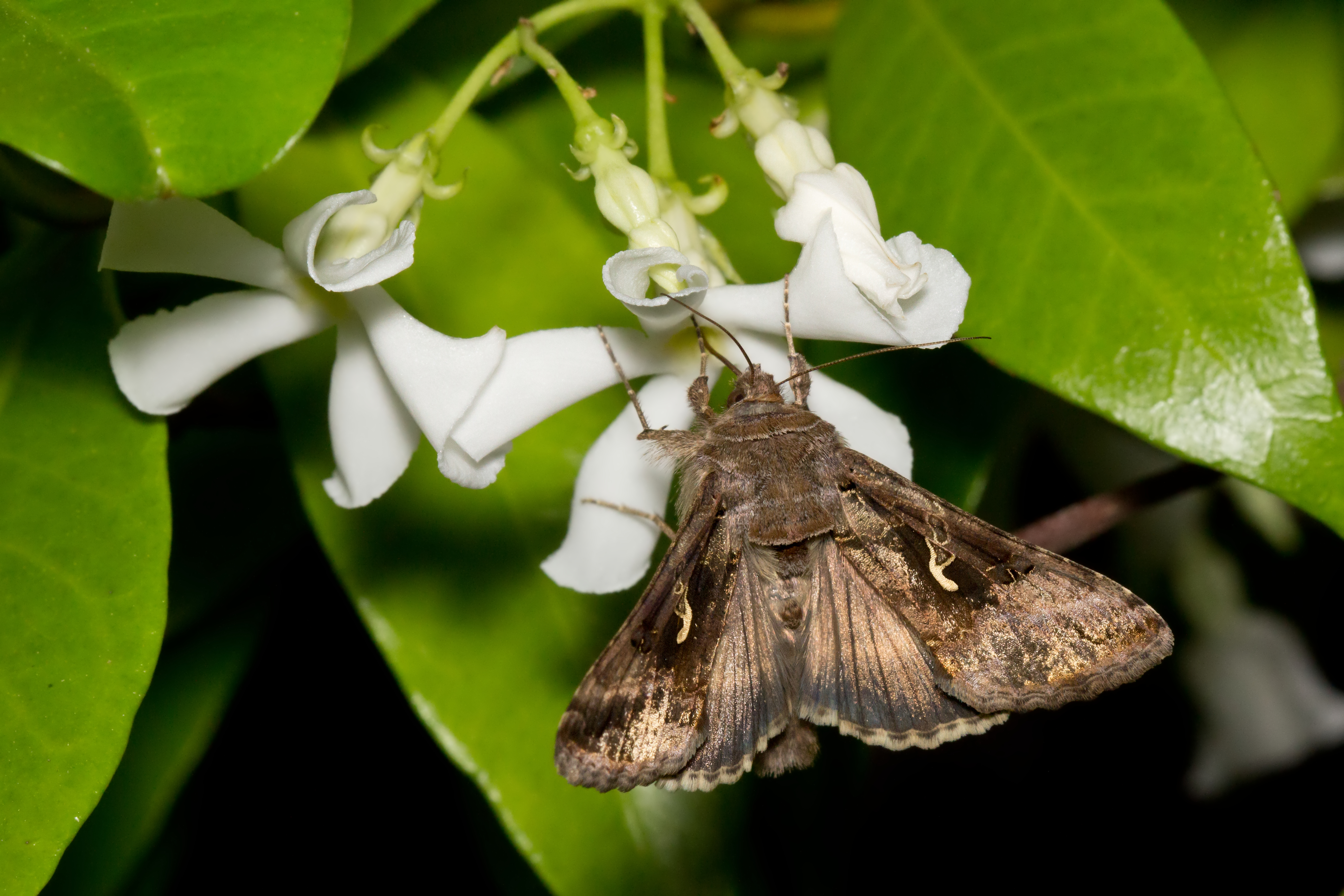
On Trachelospermum jasminoides

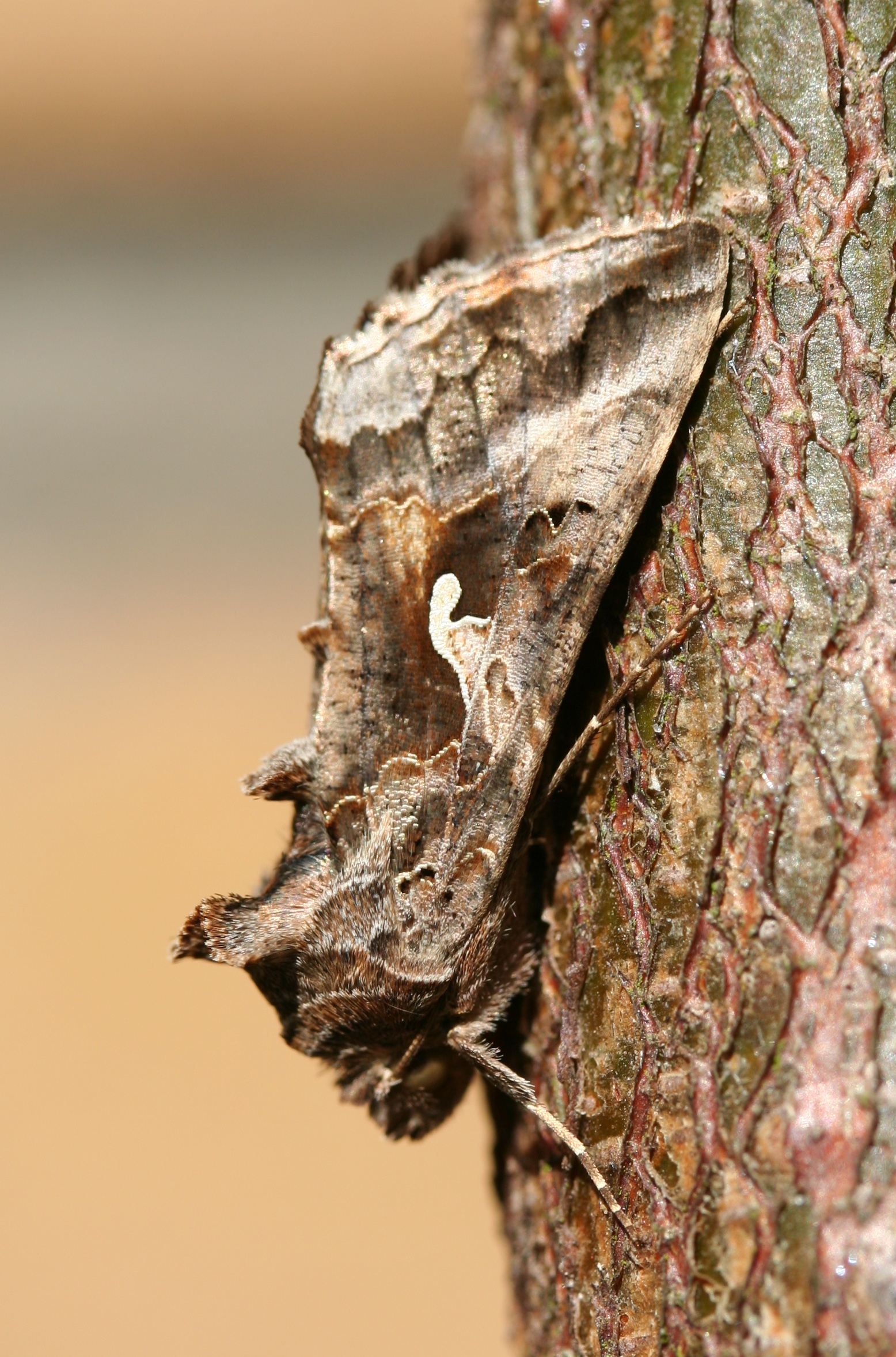
A. gamma profile

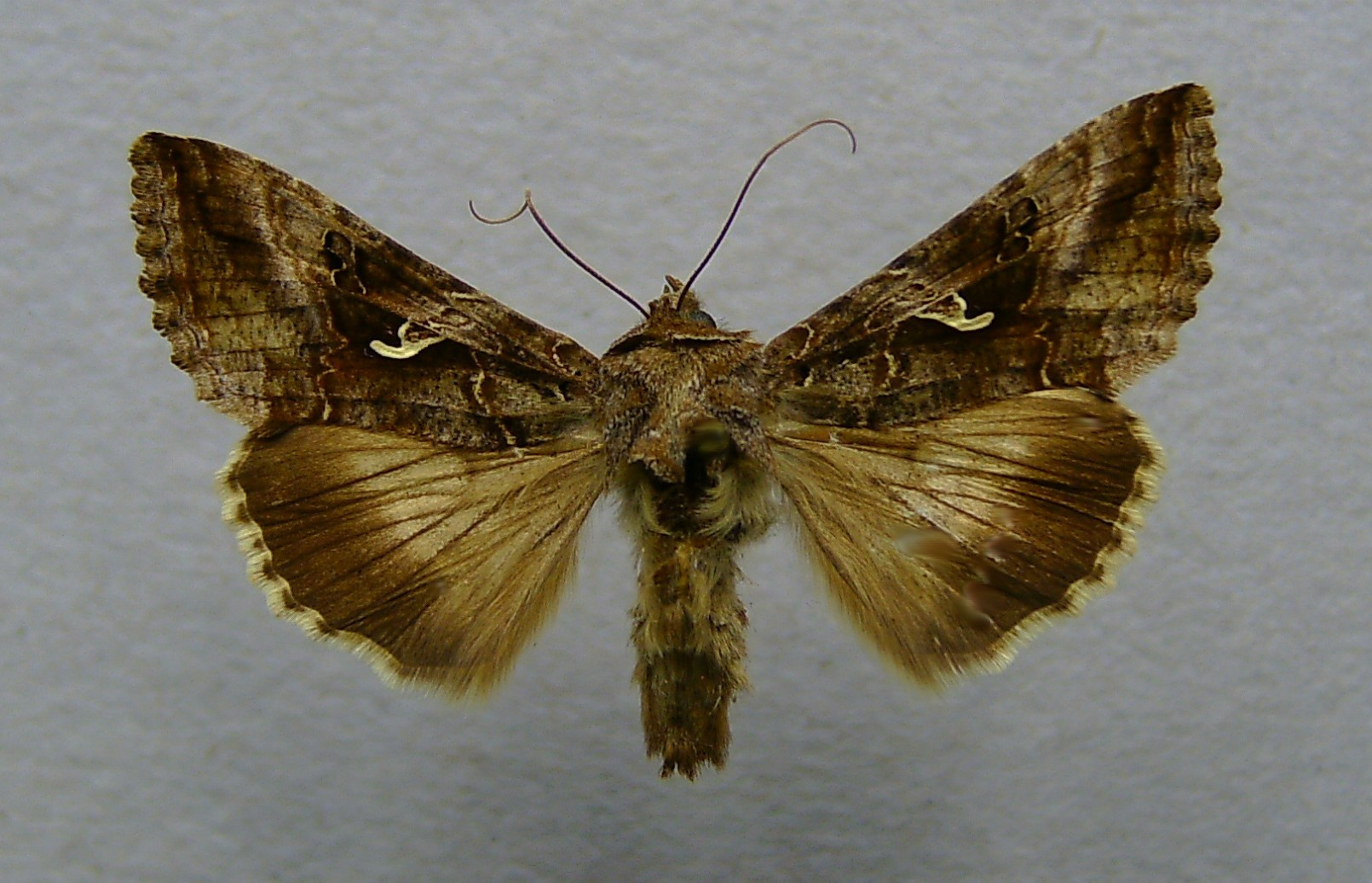
A. gamma mounted specimen

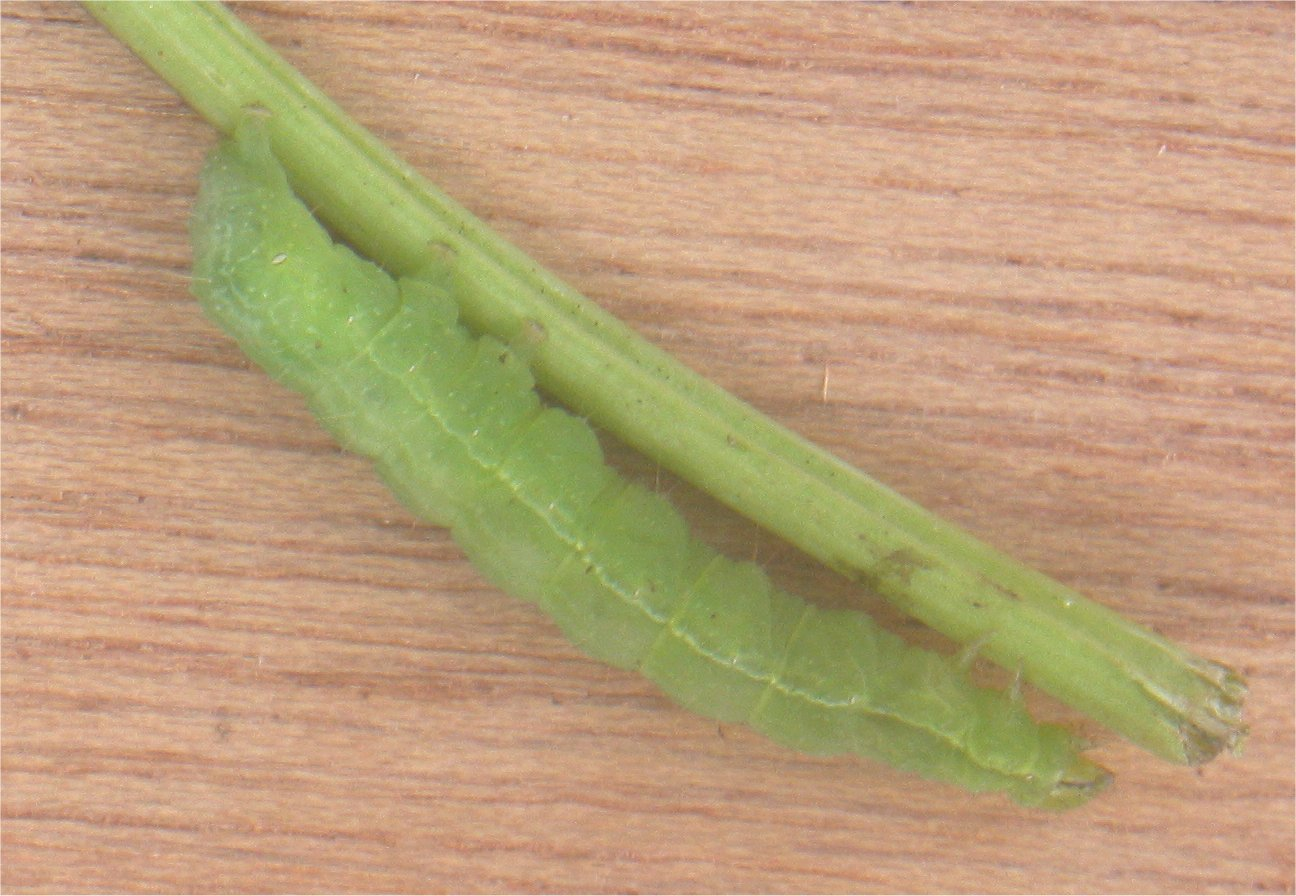
Caterpillar on carrot (Daucus carota) stem

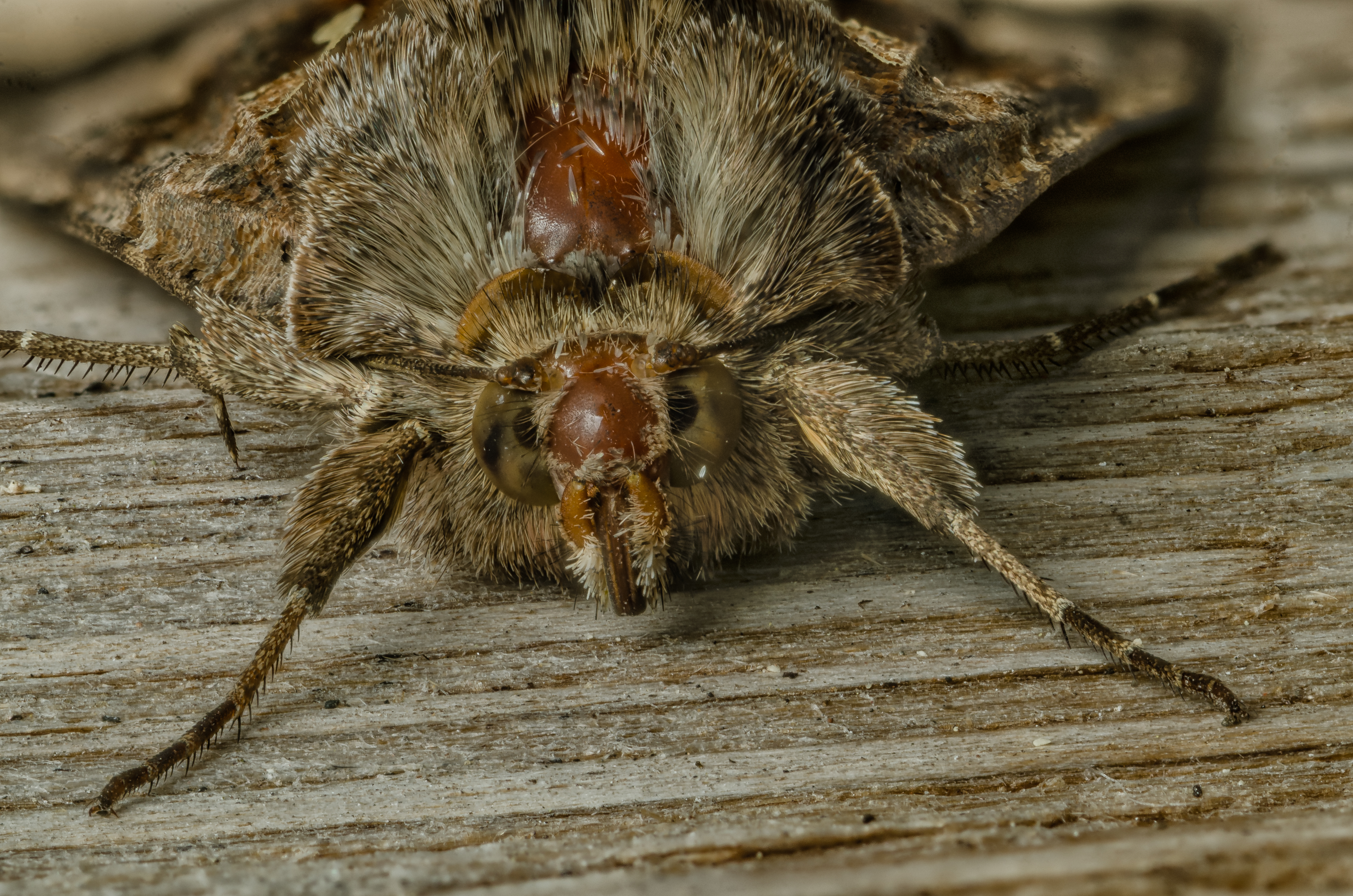
Close-up frontal view

video of Autographa gamma in Hesse, Germany
