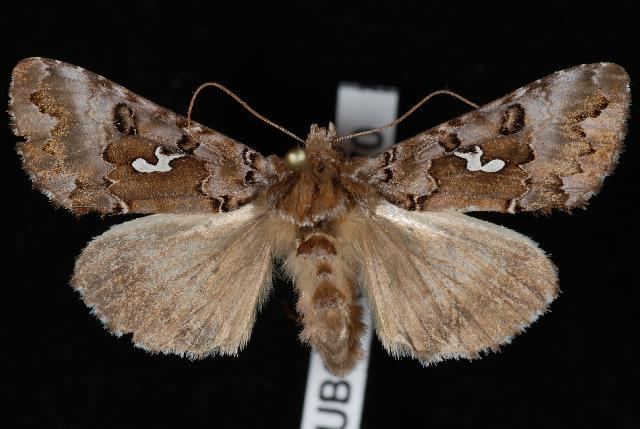

Scientific classification
- Domain: Eukaryota
- Kingdom: Animalia
- Phylum: Arthropoda
- Class: Insecta
- Order: Lepidoptera
- Superfamily: Noctuoidea
- Family: Noctuidae
- Genus: Autographa
- Species: A. corusca

Binomial name
- Autographa corusca Strecker, 1885

Synonyms
- Plusia corusca

= Autographa corusca =

Species of moth

Autographa corusca is a moth of the family Noctuidae. It is endemic to the wet coastal forests of the Pacific Northwest, extending from northern California, through Washington and British Columbia to southern Alaska.

The wingspan is about 33 mm. Adults are on wing in midsummer.

The larvae feed on Alnus species.
