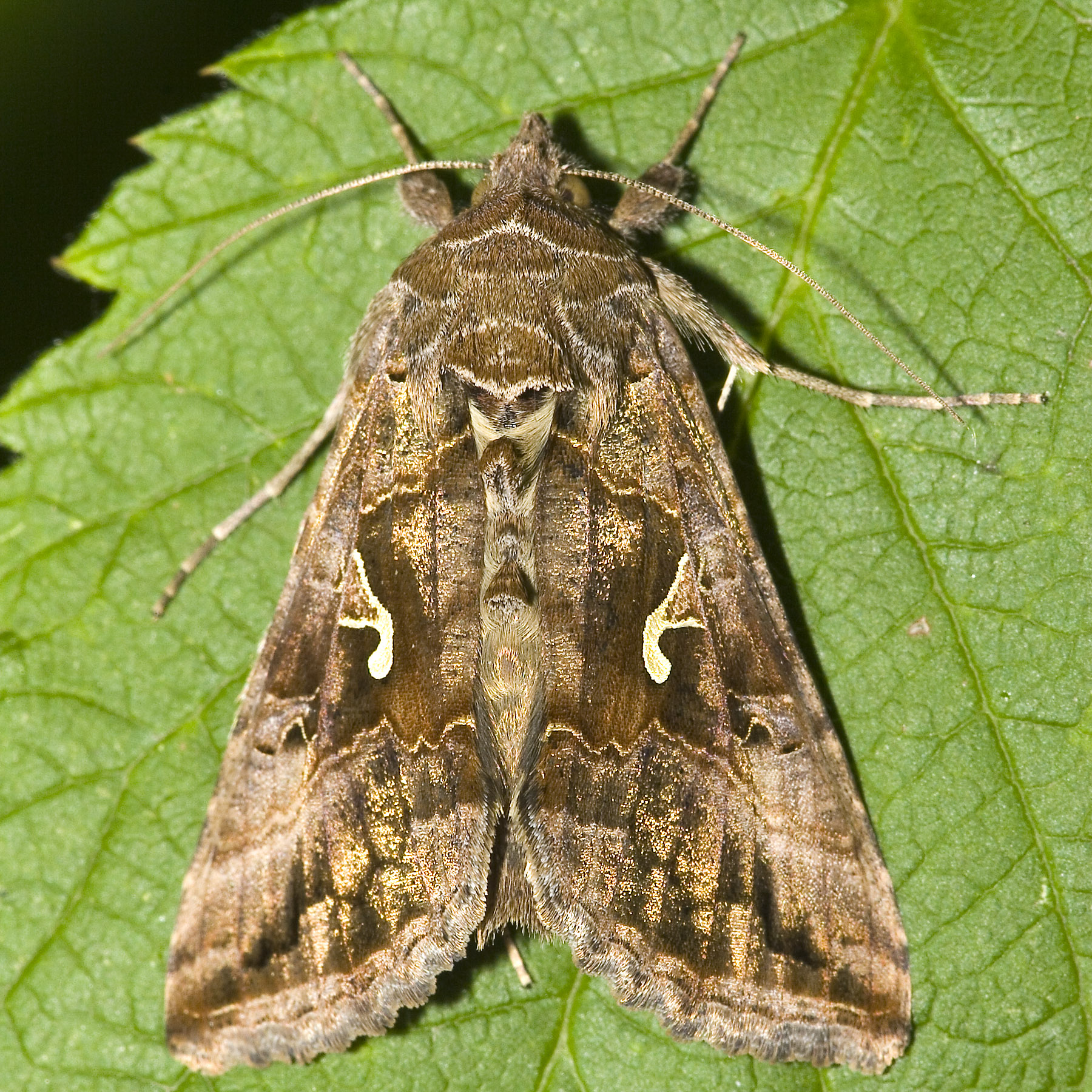
- Silver Y, Autographa gamma

Scientific classification
- Kingdom: Animalia
- Phylum: Arthropoda
- Clade: Pancrustacea
- Class: Insecta
- Order: Lepidoptera
- Superfamily: Noctuoidea
- Family: Noctuidae
- Subtribe: Plusiina
- Genus: Autographa; Hübner, 1821

= Autographa =

Genus of moths

Autographa is a genus of moths of the family Noctuidae.

== Species ==
- Autographa aemula (Denis & Schiffermüller, 1775)
- Autographa ampla (Walker, [1858])
- Autographa amurica (Staudinger, 1892)
- Autographa argyrosigna (Moore, 1882)
- Autographa bimaculata (Stephens, 1830)
- Autographa bractea (Denis & Schiffermüller, 1775) - gold spangle
- Autographa buraetica (Staudinger, 1892)
- Autographa caladii (Sepp, 1855)
- Autographa californica (Speyer, 1875) - alfalfa looper
- Autographa camptosema (Hampson, 1913)
- Autographa corusca (Strecker, 1885)
- Autographa crypta Dufay, 1973
- Autographa dudgeoni (Hampson, 1913)
- Autographa excelsa (Kretschmar, 1862)
- Autographa flagellum (Walker, [1858])
- Autographa flavida Lafontaine & Dickel, 2004
- Autographa gamma (Linnaeus, 1758) - silver Y
- Autographa jota (Linnaeus, 1758) - plain golden Y
- Autographa khinjana Wiltshire, 1961
- Autographa kostjuki Klyuchko, 1984
- Autographa labrosa (Grote, 1875)
- Autographa lehri Klyuchko, 1984
- Autographa macrogamma (Eversmann, 1842)
- Autographa mandarina (Freyer, 1845)
- Autographa mappa (Grote & Robinson, 1868)
- Autographa metallica (Grote, 1875)
- Autographa monogramma (Alphéraky, 1887)
- Autographa nekrasovi Klyuchko, 1985
- Autographa nigrisigna (Walker, [1858])
- Autographa pasiphaeia (Grote, 1873)
- Autographa precationis (Guenée, 1852)
- Autographa pseudogamma (Grote, 1875)
- Autographa pulchrina (Haworth, 1809) - beautiful golden Y
- Autographa purpureofusa (Hampson, 1894)
- Autographa rubida Ottolengui, 1902
- Autographa sansoni Dod, 1910
- Autographa schalisema (Hampson, 1913)
- Autographa sinooccidentalis Chou & Lu, 1979
- Autographa speciosa Ottolengui, 1902
- Autographa ternei Klyuchko, 1984
- Autographa urupina (Bryk, 1942)
- Autographa v-alba Ottolengui, 1902
- Autographa v-minus (Oberthür, 1884)
