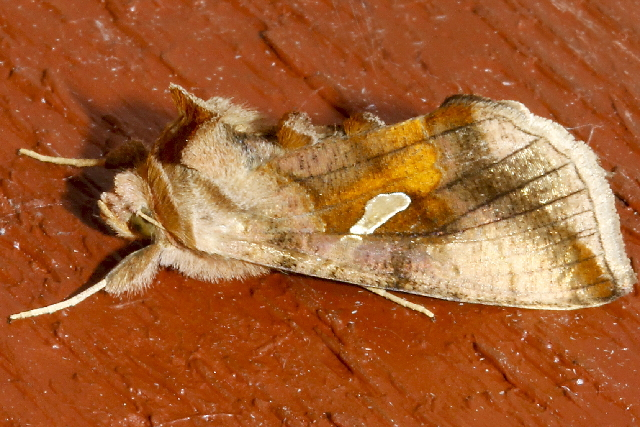

Scientific classification
- Kingdom: Animalia
- Phylum: Arthropoda
- Class: Insecta
- Order: Lepidoptera
- Superfamily: Noctuoidea
- Family: Noctuidae
- Genus: Autographa
- Species: A. metallica

Binomial name
- Autographa metallica Grote, 1875

Synonyms
- Plusia metallica; Plusia scapularis; Plusia lenzii

= Autographa metallica =

Shaded gold spot

Species of moth

Autographa metallica, the shaded gold spot, is a moth of the family Noctuidae. The species was first described by Augustus Radcliffe Grote in 1875. It is found in western North America from the southern Alaska coast and the Queen Charlotte and Vancouver Islands south to central California, east to the Alberta-British Columbia border and south in the Rocky Mountains to central Colorado.

The wingspan is 38–40 mm. Adults are on wing from July to August depending on the location.

The larvae feed probably feed on various herbs.
