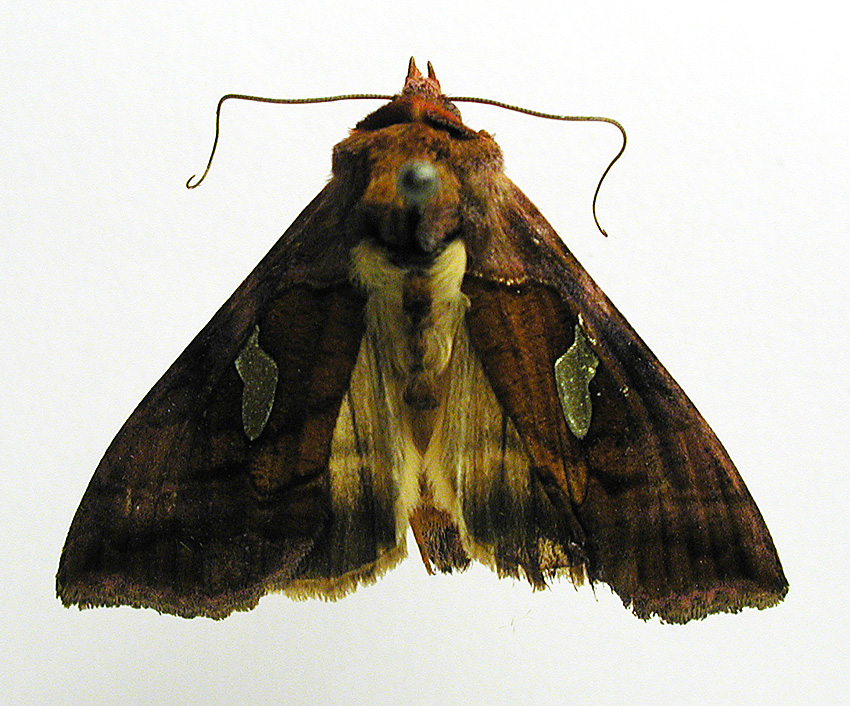

Scientific classification
- Domain: Eukaryota
- Kingdom: Animalia
- Phylum: Arthropoda
- Class: Insecta
- Order: Lepidoptera
- Superfamily: Noctuoidea
- Family: Noctuidae
- Genus: Autographa
- Species: A. excelsa

Binomial name
- Autographa excelsa (Kretschmar, 1862)

Synonyms
- Plusia excelsa Kretschmar, 1862; Plusia metabractea Butler, 1881; Phytometra parabractea Hampson, 1913

= Autographa excelsa =

Species of moth

Autographa excelsa is a moth of the family Noctuidae. It is found in the Baltic region, southern Finland, the Tatra Mountains, northern European Russia, Siberia, the Korean Peninsula and Japan.

The wingspan is 38–42 mm. Adults are on wing from the end of July to August.

The larvae feed on Urtica species.
