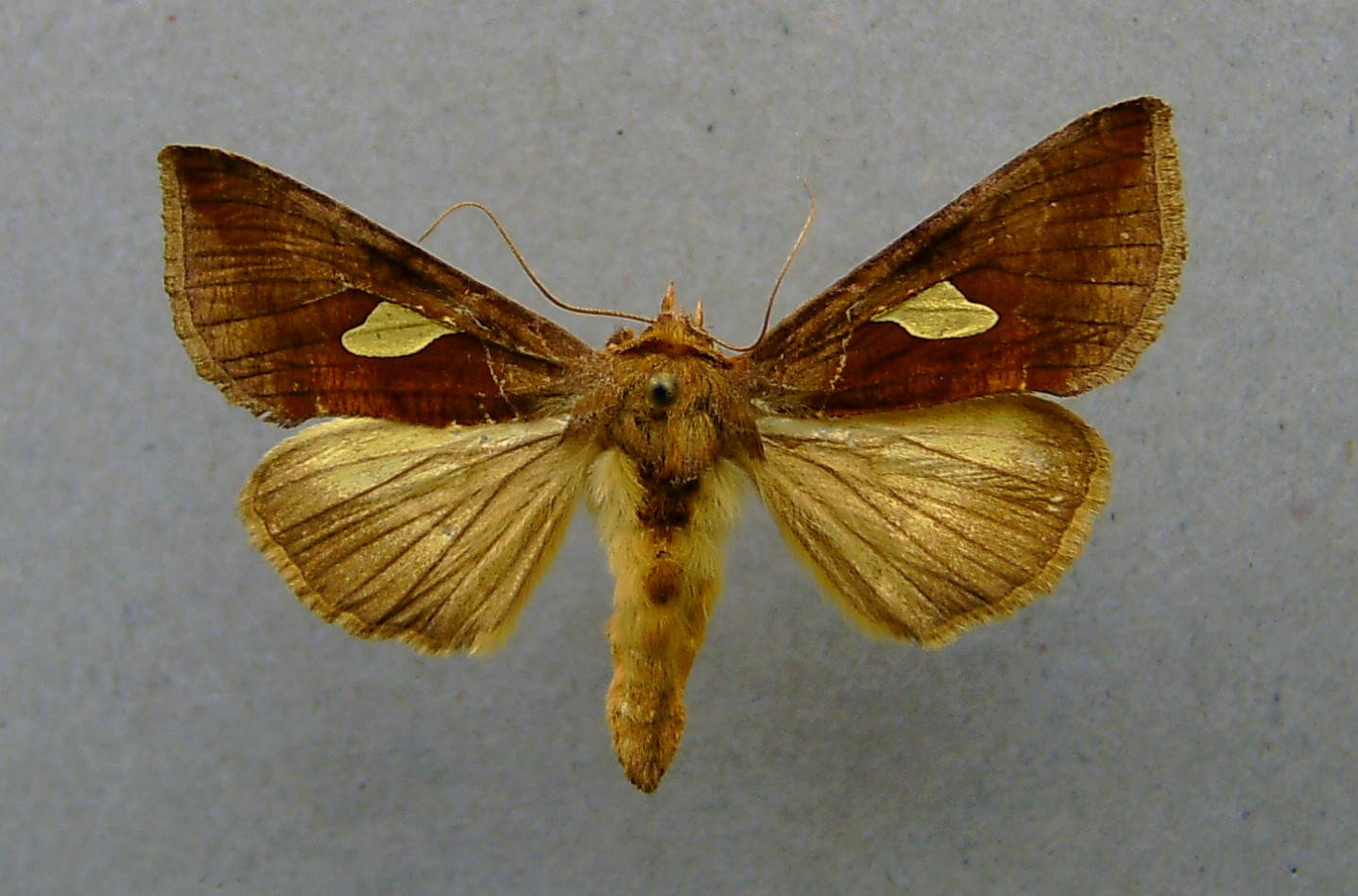

Scientific classification
- Kingdom: Animalia
- Phylum: Arthropoda
- Class: Insecta
- Order: Lepidoptera
- Superfamily: Noctuoidea
- Family: Noctuidae
- Genus: Autographa
- Species: A. bractea

Binomial name
- Autographa bractea (Denis & Schiffermüller, 1775)

Synonyms
- Plusia bractea; Phytometra bractea; Noctua bractea; Phalaena securis

= Gold spangle =

Species of moth

The gold spangle (Autographa bractea) is a moth of the family Noctuidae. The species was first described by Michael Denis and Ignaz Schiffermüller in 1775. It is found in Europe, across western Siberia and the Altai Mountains, the northern Caucasus, northern Turkey and northern Iran.

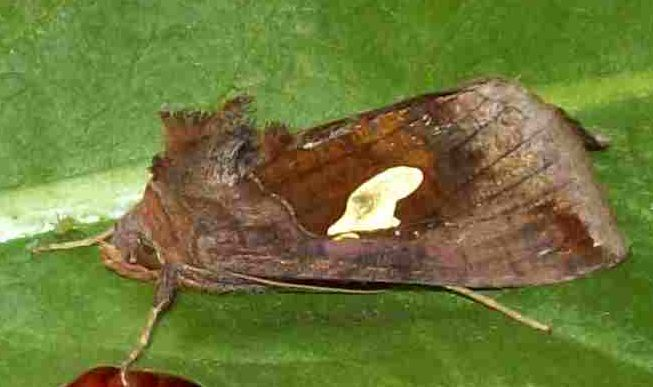

P. bractea F. ( = securis Vill.) Forewing purplish fuscous with many fine dark strigulae; the lines finely dark but indistinct, inwardly oblique; the inner line below middle finely golden, the outer golden at inner margin only; median area below middle ferruginous brown, containing at base of vein 2 a large irregular somewhat sinuous shining golden blotch (the golden blotch varies from a subquadrate, somewhat anvil-shaped mark to an elongate, sinuous, tongue-shaped one); a deeper diffuse shade from apex to middle; hindwing dull bronzy yellowish tinged with fuscous; the terminal area diffusely deep fuscous. Larva pale green; dorsal and spiracular lines white; head pale green marked with brown. Its wingspan is 42–50 mm.

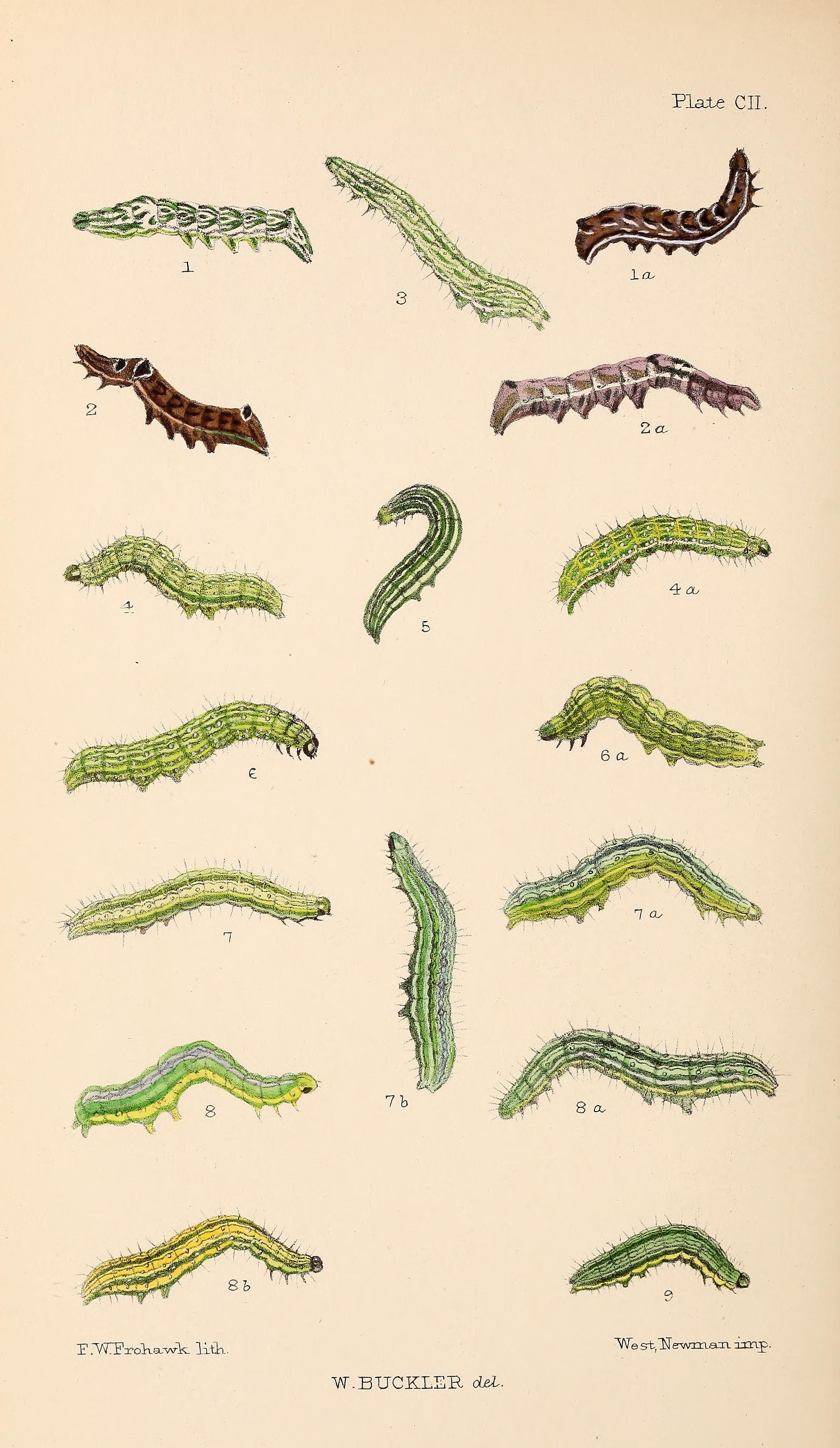
Figs. 4, 4a larvae in two stages of growth

== Biology ==
The moth flies from July to August depending on the location, and migrates long distances. The larvae feed on a wide range of plants including Hieracium, Tussilago farfara, Plantago, Crepis paludosa, Taraxacum, Urtica, Lamium, Stachys and Eupatorium cannabinum.
