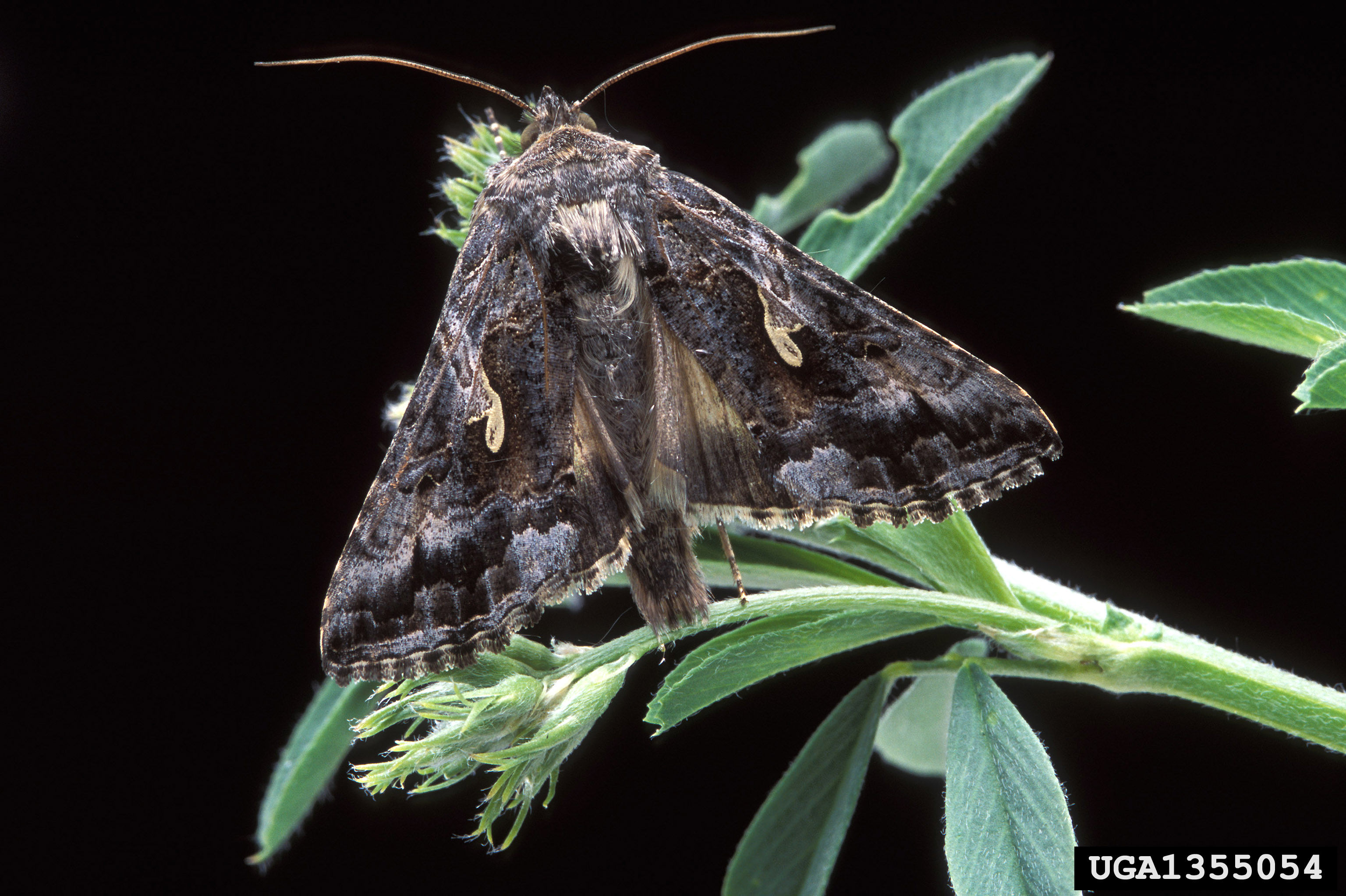

Scientific classification
- Domain: Eukaryota
- Kingdom: Animalia
- Phylum: Arthropoda
- Class: Insecta
- Order: Lepidoptera
- Superfamily: Noctuoidea
- Family: Noctuidae
- Genus: Autographa
- Species: A. californica

Binomial name
- Autographa californica (Speyer, 1875)

= Autographa californica =

Species of moth

Autographa californica, the alfalfa looper, is a moth of the family Noctuidae. The species was first described by Adolph Speyer in 1875. It is found in western North America from southern British Columbia to Baja California and to Manitoba, South Dakota, Colorado and New Mexico.

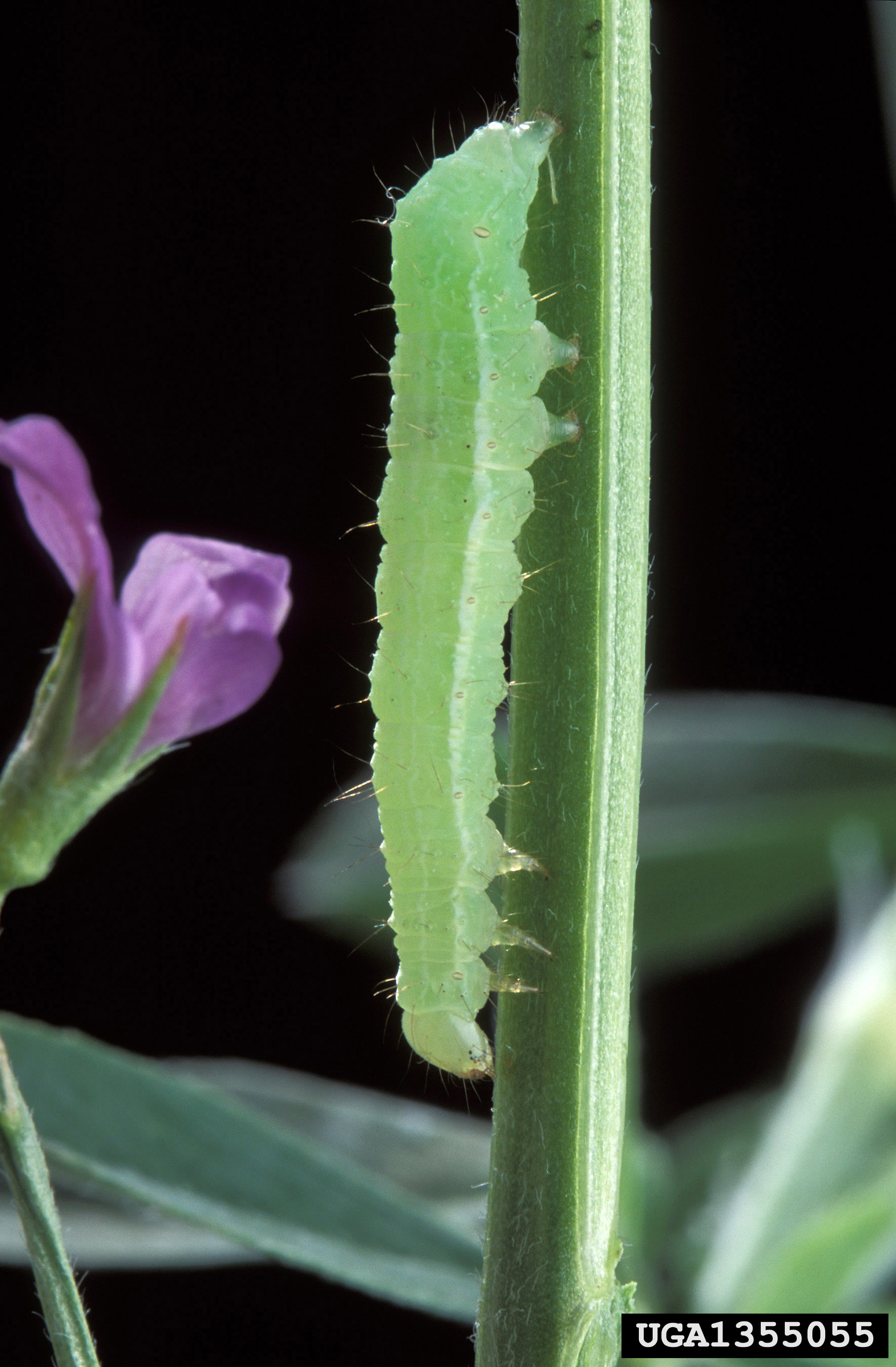
Caterpillar

The wingspan is 36–42 mm. The moth flies from July to October depending on the location.

The larvae feed on a wide range of plants. Recorded food plants include species of families Apiaceae, Aquifoliaceae, Asteraceae, Boraginaceae, Brassicaceae, Caprifoliaceae, Chenopodiaceae, Cucurbitaceae, Ericaceae, Eschscholzia, Fabaceae, Grossulariaceae, Liliaceae, Lamiaceae, Linaceae, Malvaceae, Plantaginaceae, Poaceae, Podocarpaceae, Polygonaceae, Rhamnaceae, Rosaceae, Rutaceae, Scrophulariaceae, Solanaceae and Verbenaceae.
