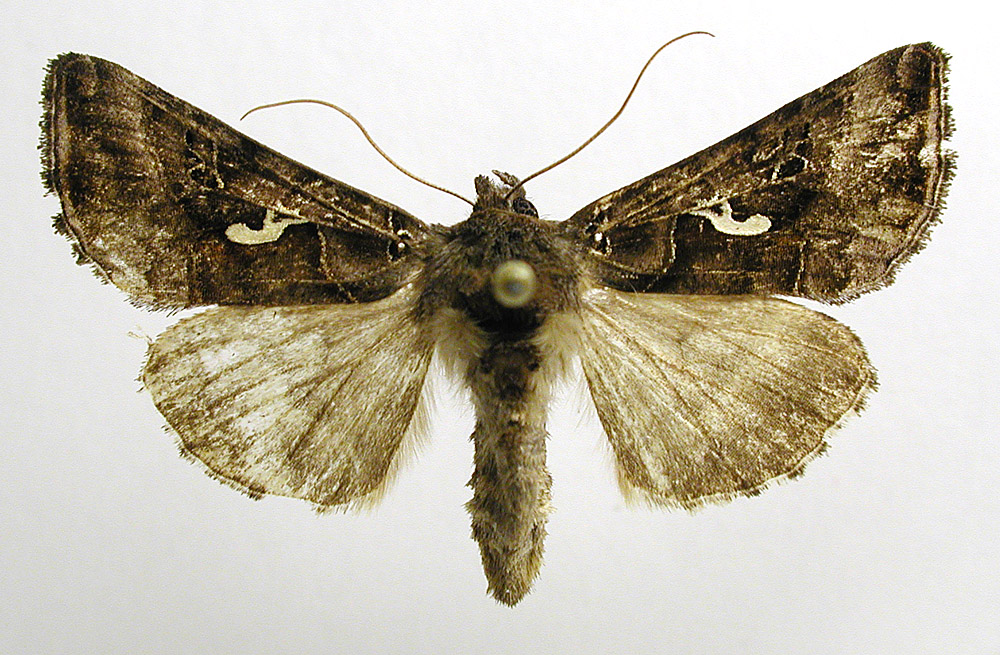

Scientific classification
- Domain: Eukaryota
- Kingdom: Animalia
- Phylum: Arthropoda
- Class: Insecta
- Order: Lepidoptera
- Superfamily: Noctuoidea
- Family: Noctuidae
- Genus: Autographa
- Species: A. mandarina

Binomial name
- Autographa mandarina (Freyer, 1845)

Synonyms
- Plusia mandarina Freyer, 1845; Plusia interscalaris Herrich-Schäffer, [1850]; Plusia interscalaris Eversmann, 1857; Plusia typinota Butler, 1878; Plusia obscura Oberthür, 1884

= Autographa mandarina =

Species of moth

Autographa mandarina is a moth of the family Noctuidae. It is found in Fennoscandia, the Baltic region, Poland, the northern part of European Russia, Belarus and Siberia.

The wingspan is 34–38 mm. Adults are on wing from August to September.

The larvae feed on Cirsium, Taraxacum, Lamium, Plantago and Urtica species.
