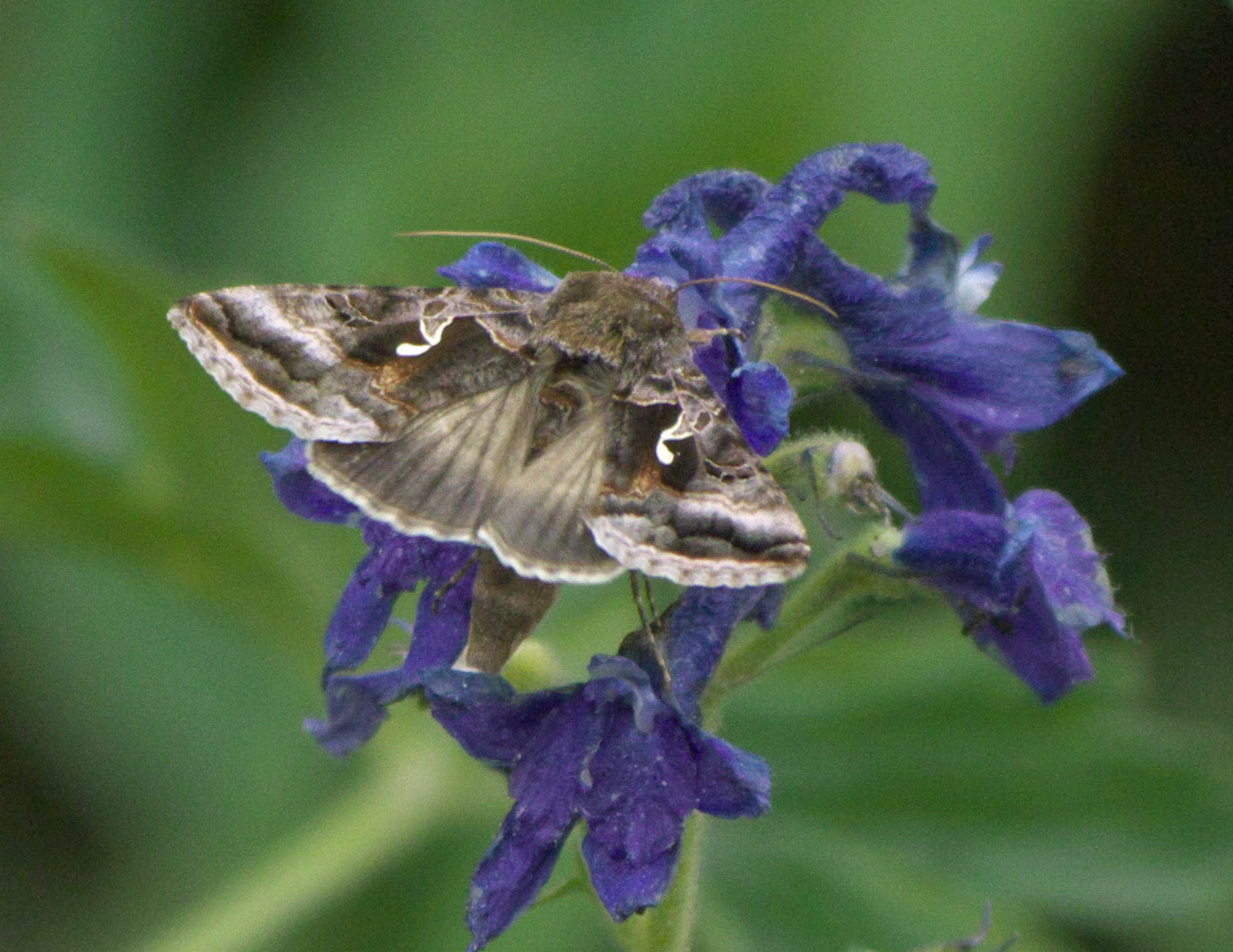

Scientific classification
- Kingdom: Animalia
- Phylum: Arthropoda
- Class: Insecta
- Order: Lepidoptera
- Superfamily: Noctuoidea
- Family: Noctuidae
- Genus: Autographa
- Species: A. pseudogamma

Binomial name
- Autographa pseudogamma Grote, 1875

Synonyms
- Plusia pseudogamma

= Autographa pseudogamma =

Delicate silver Y

Species of moth

Autographa pseudogamma, the delicate silver Y, is a moth of the family Noctuidae. The species was first described by Augustus Radcliffe Grote in 1875. It is found in North America from Newfoundland to coastal northern Alaska, south in the east to New England and in the western mountains to New Mexico, Arizona and California. It is also found in the Cypress Hills and the Black Hills of South Dakota.

The wingspan is 40–45 mm. Adults are on wing from July to August depending on the location. There is a single generation per year.
