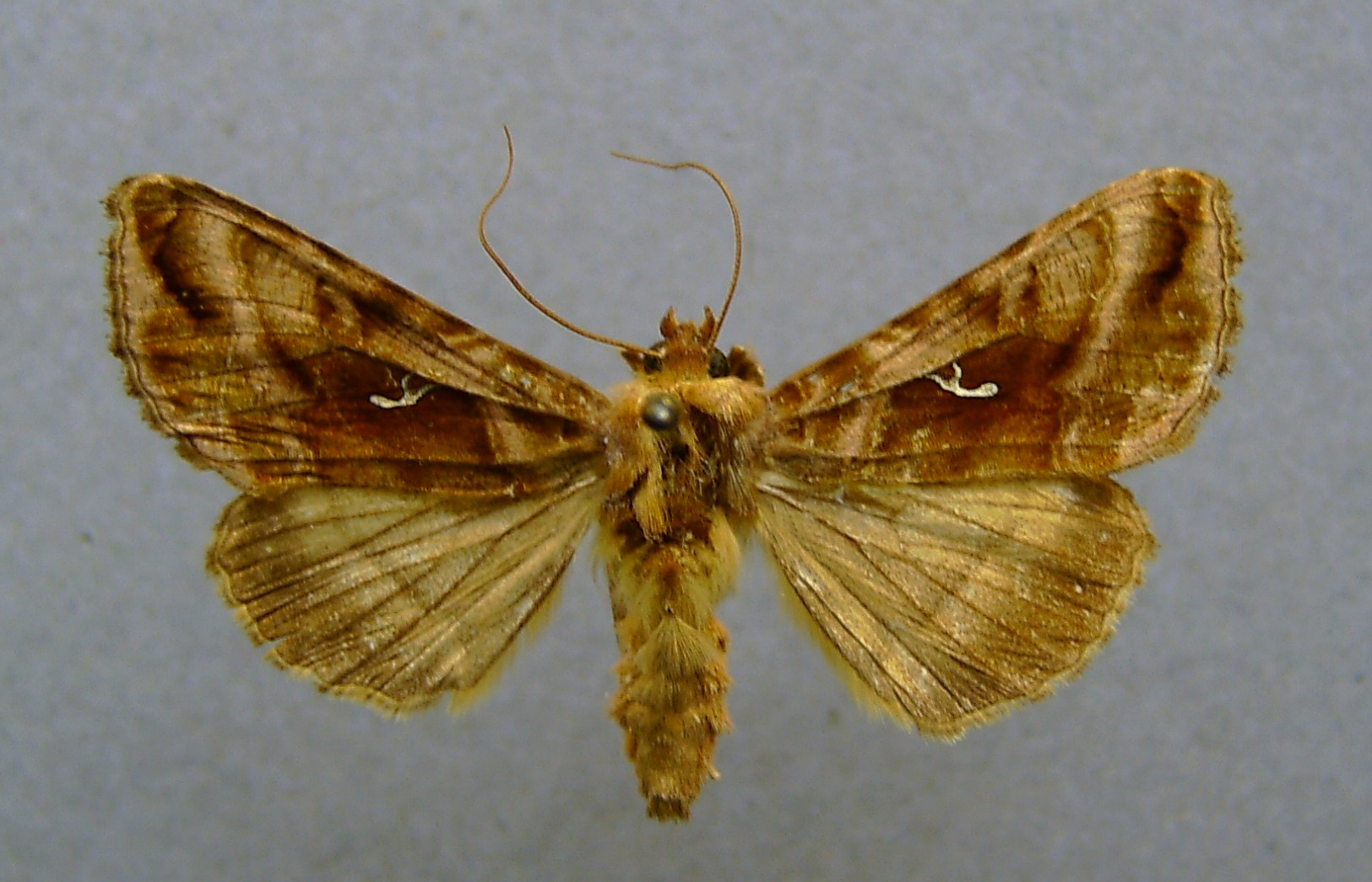

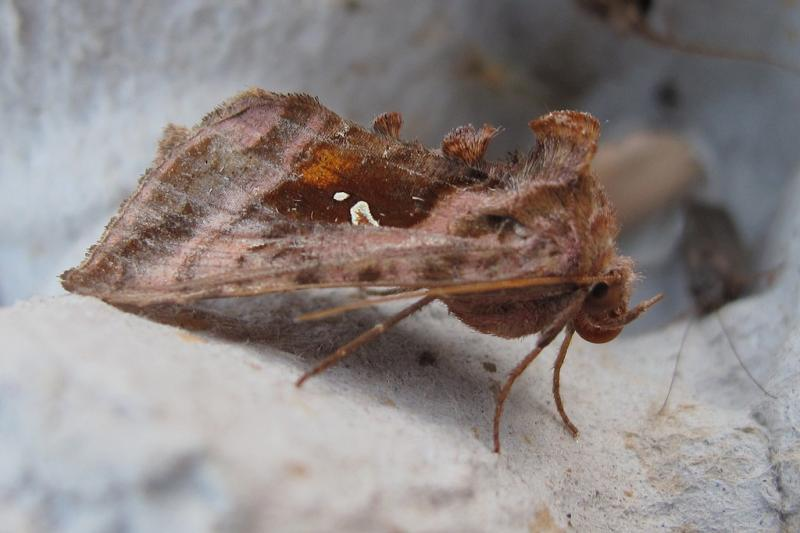

Scientific classification
- Kingdom: Animalia
- Phylum: Arthropoda
- Class: Insecta
- Order: Lepidoptera
- Superfamily: Noctuoidea
- Family: Noctuidae
- Genus: Autographa
- Species: A. jota

Binomial name
- Autographa jota (Linnaeus, 1758)

Synonyms
- Phalaena jota; Phalaena protea; Noctua inscripta; Plusia percontationis; Chrysodeixis aurigutta; Plusia ancora; Plusia bartholomaeii; Plusia jota var. baltica; Phytometra iota var. gammaaurina

= Autographa jota =

Plain golden Y

Species of moth

Autographa jota, commonly known as plain golden Y, is a moth of the family Noctuidae. The nominate form is found in Europe. while the subspecies Autographa jota anatolica is found in the southern Balkans, south-western Asia, Turkey, the Caucasus, and north-western Iran.

== Description ==
The wingspan is 36–44 millimetres (1.4–1.7 in).Forewing pale dull rosy, with olive fuscous shading; a brown spot at middle of base: inner and outer lines nearly straight, edged with brown; median area from inner margin to above middle ferruginous brown; a small V-shaped spot on vein 2 and a small round spot close beyond it pale golden; reniform stigma in part brownish edged; subterminal line suffusedly margined with olive brown, except above anal angle; hindwing fuscous brown, the terminal border darker; in the rarer form percontationis Tr. the two golden marks are coalescent; on the other hand the outer spot, and sometimes both, may be wanting as in the ab. inscripta Esp.; in the form inscripta, from the Baltic provinces of Russia, the ground colour is much darker, especially in the lower part of the median area; a similar dark form, but with the golden markings confluent as in percontationis Tr., — subsp. [now species Autographa monogramma (Alphéraky, 1887)] monogramma Alph. is met with in Turkestan and the Ussuri district.

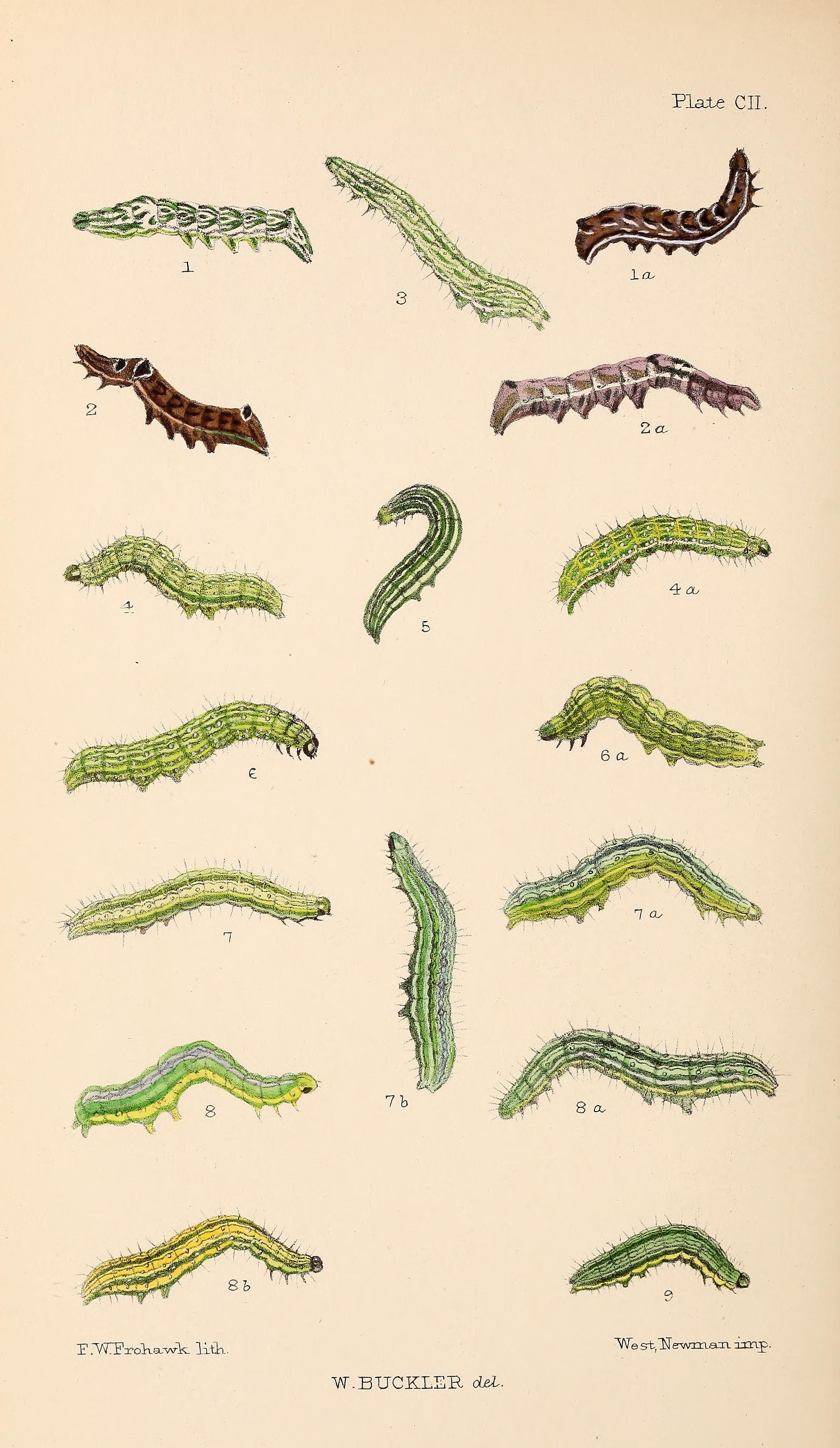
Figs.6, 6a larvae after last moult

The caterpillars are light green in colour and have a dark, white bordered dorsal line as well as slightly wavy, white secondary dorsal lines and also white lateral stripes and point warts. The spiracles are yellowish, the head green. The pupa is black, yellowish at the bottom.

== Biology ==
The moth flies from June to August depending on the location.

The larvae feed on the leaves of a wide range of plants, including Urtica, Lamium, Stachys, Galeopsis, Eupatorium cannabinum, Vaccinium myrtillus, Salvia and Senecio.

== Subspecies ==
There are two recognised subspecies:

- Autographa jota anatolica (Southern Balkans, South-western Asia, Turkey, Caucasus, North-western Iran)
- Autographa jota jota
