= Rodrigues Ottolengui =

American novelist

Rodrigues Ottolengui (March 15, 1861 – July 11, 1937) was an American writer and dentist of Sephardic descent. Born in Charleston, South Carolina, he moved to New York City, where he would spend most of his adult life, in 1877.

== Biography ==
One of three children, Ottolengui was a son of Daniel Ottolengui and Helen Rosalie Rodrigues Ottolengui; he had a sister, Helen, and a brother, Lee. He was cousins with Octavus Roy Cohen, who also wrote crime fiction.

He was the editor of Items of Interest: A Monthly Magazine of Dental Art, Science, and Literature for thirty-five years, which he continued to edit after retiring from dentistry; he compiled Table Talks on Dentistry, drawing from articles in Items of Interest. A dental pioneer, Ottolengui was one of the first to use X-rays and was a specialist in orthodontics and root canal therapy. He was also interested in entomology, taxidermy, and photography.

In addition to his work in dentistry, Ottolengui is remembered as an early exponent of detective fiction, with four novels and a short story collection published during the 1890s. The short story volume, Final Proof, was recognized by Ellery Queen as one of Queen's Quorum—the most important collections of detective short stories. Many years later a second series, Before the Fact, originally published in 1901, was discovered and published in book form edited and introduced by detective fiction scholar Douglas G. Greene.

His wife, May C. Hall Ottolengui, died on 10 July 1936; he died at his New York residence the next year of a heart ailment and a stroke caused by a long illness. His sister died on 22 July 1938.

== Bibliography ==
=== Novels and short story collections ===
- An Artist in Crime (1892)
- A Conflict of Evidence (1893)
- A Modern Wizard (1894)
- The Crime of the Century (1896)
- Final Proof; or, the Value of Evidence (short story collection; 1898)
- The Ottolengui Portfolio (2005; an omnibus of the 4 novels and the short stories)
- Before the Fact (2012; first book publication of a 1901 series of stories)

=== Stories ===
- "The Azteck Opal"
- "The Montezuma Emerald"
- "The Nameless Man"
- "A Novel Forgery"
- "A Singular Abduction"

=== Non-fiction ===
- Methods of Filling Teeth
- Table Talks on Dentistry
