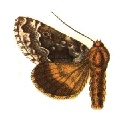
- Male Syngrapha angulidens angulidens

Scientific classification
- Domain: Eukaryota
- Kingdom: Animalia
- Phylum: Arthropoda
- Class: Insecta
- Order: Lepidoptera
- Superfamily: Noctuoidea
- Family: Noctuidae
- Genus: Syngrapha
- Species: S. angulidens

Binomial name
- Syngrapha angulidens (Smith, 1891)

Synonyms
- Plusia angulidens Smith, 1891; Autographa alta Ottolengui, 1919; Autographa excelsa Ottolengui, 1902 (preocc. Autographa excelsa (Kretschmar, 1862)); Syngrapha excelsa (Ottolengui, 1902)

= Syngrapha angulidens =

Species of moth

Syngrapha angulidens is a moth of the family Noctuidae first described by Smith in 1891. It is found from Alaska south in the mountains to northern Oregon, western Nevada, Arizona and New Mexico and east to Colorado, western Wyoming, Montana and Alberta.

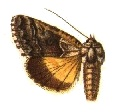
Female Syngrapha angulidens excelsa

The wingspan is 30–34 mm. Adults are on wing from July to August depending on the location. There is one generation per year.

The larvae feed on Abies and Pseudotsuga species.

== Subspecies ==
There are two recognised subspecies:

- Syngrapha angulidens angulidens
- Syngrapha angulidens excelsa
