= Syngrapha montana =

Scientific classification
- Domain: Eukaryota
- Kingdom: Animalia
- Phylum: Arthropoda
- Class: Insecta
- Order: Lepidoptera
- Superfamily: Noctuoidea
- Family: Noctuidae
- Genus: Syngrapha
- Species: S. montana

Binomial name
- Syngrapha montana (Packard, 1869)

Synonyms
- Plusia montana Packard, 1869

Species of moth

Syngrapha montana (Labrador tea looper) is a moth of the family Noctuidae. It is found from coast to coast in most of Canada south in the east to New England and the Great Lakes.

There is one generation per year.

The larvae feed on Ledum groenlandicum.
