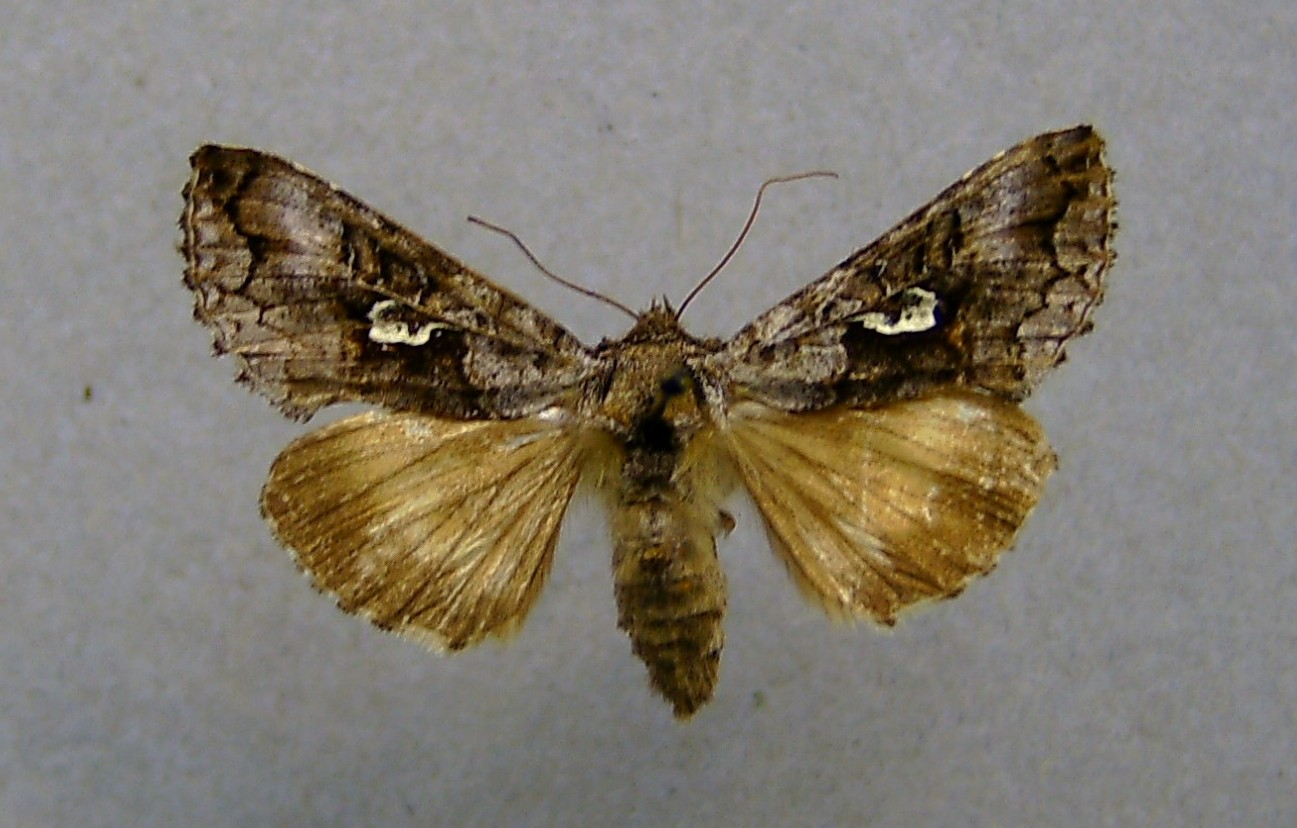

Scientific classification
- Kingdom: Animalia
- Phylum: Arthropoda
- Class: Insecta
- Order: Lepidoptera
- Superfamily: Noctuoidea
- Family: Noctuidae
- Genus: Syngrapha
- Species: S. interrogationis

Binomial name
- Syngrapha interrogationis (Linnaeus, 1758)

Synonyms
- Plusia interrogationis; Phalaena interrogationis; Noctua aemula; Phalaena conscripta; Noctua subpurpurina; Phalaena aurosignata; Plusia borealis; Plusia epsilon; Autographa zeta; Syngrapha pyrenaica; Syngrapha flammifera

= Syngrapha interrogationis =

Species of moth

Syngrapha interrogationis, the scarce silver Y, is a moth of the family Noctuidae. It is found in northern part of the world including Alaska, Canada, Iceland, Europe, Siberia, the Pacific Northwest region of the United States, and Northeast Asia.

== Subspecies ==
There are three recognised subspecies:

- Syngrapha interrogationis interrogationis
- Syngrapha interrogationis herschelensis (Benjamin, 1933)
- Syngrapha interrogationis transbaikalensis (Staudinger, 1892)

== Forma ==
See aberratio

- f.cinerea Warr., with dull ash-grey, low-contrast forewings
- f.aureomaculata Vorbr., with gold instead of silver metal mark
- f.flammifera Huene, with enlarged and merged silver spots
- F. orbata Warr., without the metal mark

== Technical description and variation ==
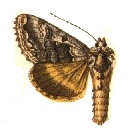
Illustration

The wingspan of S. interrogationis is 32–38 mm (1.25–1.5 in). The forewing is bright purplish-grey, suffused with black in the median area and towards the apex. The edges of the stigmata and the lines are lustrous grey, the inner and outer lines black and double. The inner line is sinuous in the costal half and otherwise forms three small curves, the outer line regularly crenulate throughout. The subterminal line is preceded by a conspicuous black toothed and indented line, with a blackish cloud towards the apex and a row of pale grey lunules before the terminal marks. The subcellular silvery mark is highly variable: in form orbata [Warren] it forms a simple loop with fine silvery edge; in the nominate form, this is followed by a small silvery dot; in form flammifera Huene, it is followed by a large round spot conjoined to it, or rarely separate; in form ignifera [Warren], a development of this last, it is pale yellow, as in some examples of flammifera, and shaped like a tadpole, but there is deep fiery red scaling before the postmedian line, beyond the antemedian, and along the submedian fold. The hindwing is brownish yellow, clouded with darker scales, and with a broad blackish border. The type specimen, a male from Livonia, is in the Tring Museum in England.

The subspecies transbaikalensis Stgr., from Dauria and East Siberia, is more uniform bluish grey, with very little black suffusion on the forewing and a paler hindwing; this form is also recorded from Estonia by Petersen. Form rosea Tutt, from Scotland, has a rosy ground colour in place of bluish grey. Form cinerea [Warren] has the ground color dull ashy grey with scarcely any dark markings, except the subterminal line, and no purplish suffusion; the silvery mark forms a somewhat triangular loop. Of this form the Tring Museum possesses three examples from Cedre, Hautes-Pyrénées. In the same museum is still another grey form, much resembling cinerea but with a complete silvery gamma mark and somewhat more developed dark shades; this specimen is from Cauterets in the Pyrenees and represents form gammifera [Warren]. These last two grey forms may constitute a species distinct from S. interrogationis.

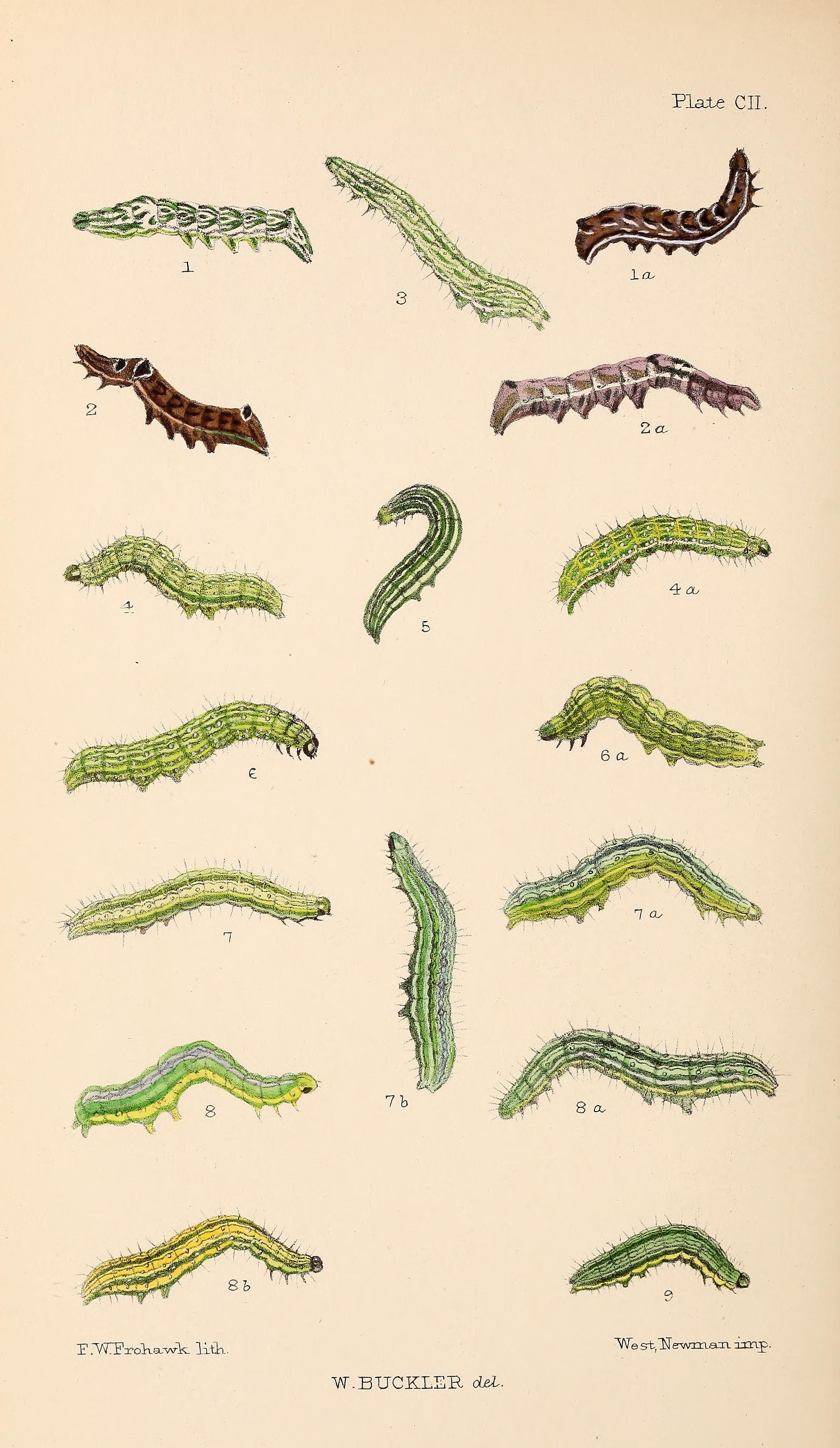
Fig.9 larvae after last moult

== Biology ==
The scarce silver Y moth flies from June to August depending on the location.

The larvae are pale green; the dorsal line is dark, with pale edges, and there are several pale wavy sub-dorsal lines and a broad whitish lateral line with dark upper edge. The larvae feed on the leaves of various plants, including Vaccinium myrtillus, Vaccinium uliginosum, Betula, Calluna vulgaris, Andromeda polifolia and Urtica.
