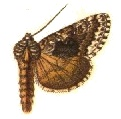

Scientific classification
- Kingdom: Animalia
- Phylum: Arthropoda
- Clade: Pancrustacea
- Class: Insecta
- Order: Lepidoptera
- Superfamily: Noctuoidea
- Family: Noctuidae
- Genus: Syngrapha
- Species: S. u-aureum

Binomial name
- Syngrapha u-aureum Guenée, 1852

Synonyms
- Plusia u-aureum Guenée, 1852; Plusia interrogationis var. grönlandica Staudinger, 1857; Plusia interrogationis var. arctica Möschler, 1884; Autographa pallida Ottolengui, 1902; Syngrapha octoscripta pallida; Plusia vaccinii H. Edwards, 1886; Syngrapha arctica; Syngrapha groenlandica

= Syngrapha u-aureum =

Species of moth

Syngrapha u-aureum, the golden looper moth, is a species of moth in the family Noctuidae. It is found from eastern Manitoba to Quebec, Labrador, southern Greenland, Newfoundland, northern Maine, northern New Hampshire and northern New York.

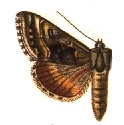
Syngrapha u-aureum female

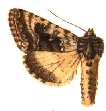
Syngrapha u-aureum male

There is one generation per year.

The larvae feed on Vaccinium species.

== Subspecies ==
There are two recognised subspecies:

- Syngrapha u-aureum u-aureum
- Syngrapha u-aureum vaccinii
