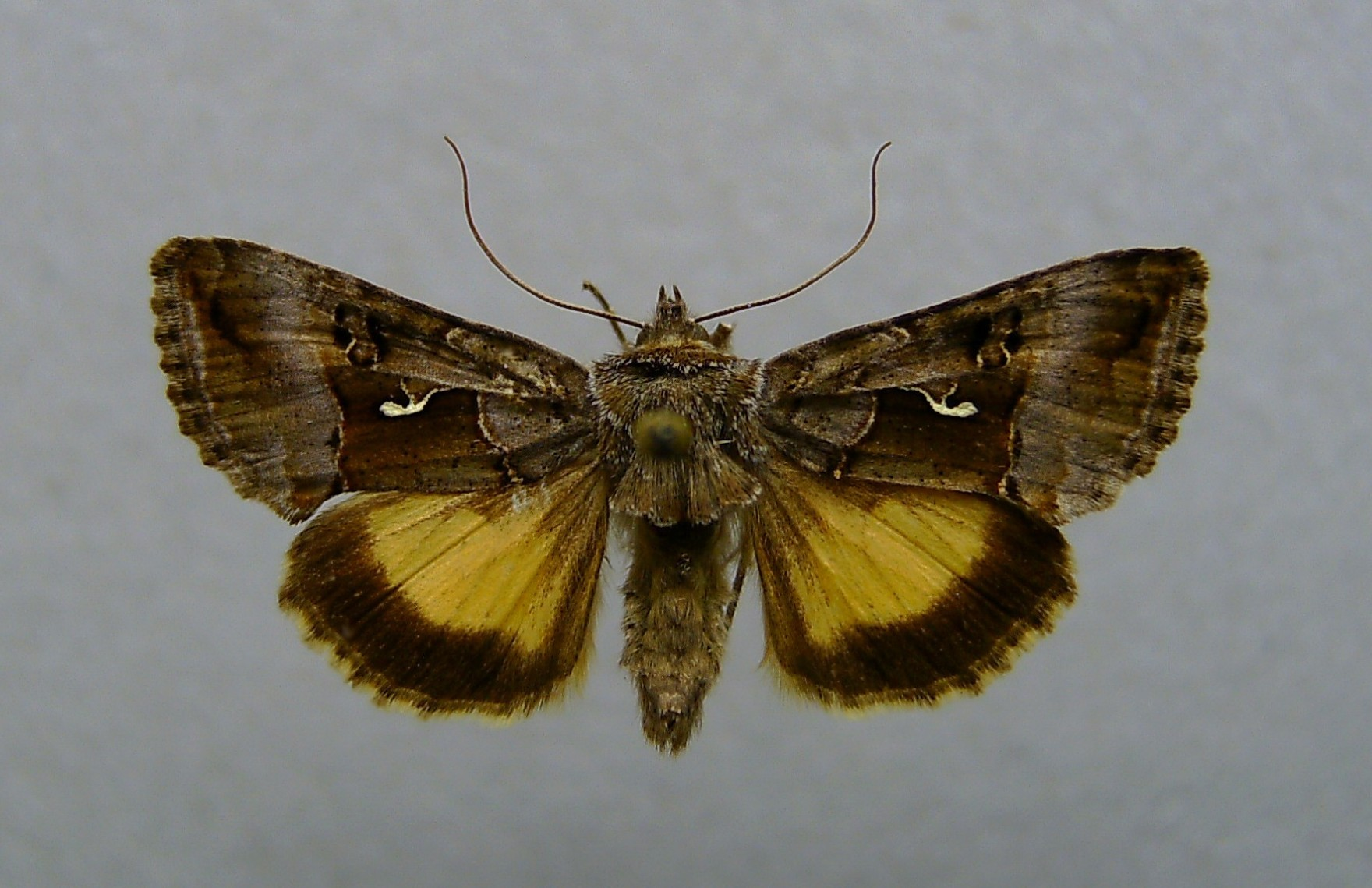

Scientific classification
- Kingdom: Animalia
- Phylum: Arthropoda
- Clade: Pancrustacea
- Class: Insecta
- Order: Lepidoptera
- Superfamily: Noctuoidea
- Family: Noctuidae
- Genus: Syngrapha
- Species: S. microgamma

Binomial name
- Syngrapha microgamma (Hübner, [1823])

Synonyms
- Noctua microgamma Hübner, 1823

= Syngrapha microgamma =

Species of moth

Syngrapha microgamma, the little bride looper moth, is a moth of the family Noctuidae. The species was first described by Jacob Hübner in 1823. It is found in much of Canada south in the east to southern Maine, northern New York, and the Great Lakes states. In Europe, it is found from Fennoscandia and central Europe east to mountains eastern Asia.

The wingspan is 26–30 mm (1.0–1.2 in). Adults are on wing from May to July depending on the location. There is one generation per year.

The larvae feed on Ledum groenlandicum, Betula nana, Salix repens, Vaccinium uliginosum and Ledum palustre.

== Subspecies ==
- Syngrapha microgamma microgamma (Fennoscandia, Baltia, Poland, north European Russia, central Asia (mountains), Kamchatka)
- Syngrapha microgamma nearctica (Labrador, Quebec to Yukon, Michigan, Wisconsin, Alberta, British Columbia, Colorado)
