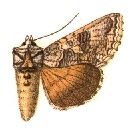

Scientific classification
- Kingdom: Animalia
- Phylum: Arthropoda
- Class: Insecta
- Order: Lepidoptera
- Superfamily: Noctuoidea
- Family: Noctuidae
- Genus: Syngrapha
- Species: S. selecta

Binomial name
- Syngrapha selecta (Walker, [1858])

Synonyms
- Plusia selecta Walker, 1858

= Syngrapha selecta =

Species of moth

Syngrapha selecta, the chosen looper moth, is a moth of the family Noctuidae. The species was first described by Francis Walker in 1858. It is found in North America from the Northwest Territories to Newfoundland south to northern Michigan.

The wingspan is about 38 mm. There is one generation per year.

Reared larvae accepted birch, blueberry and willow.
