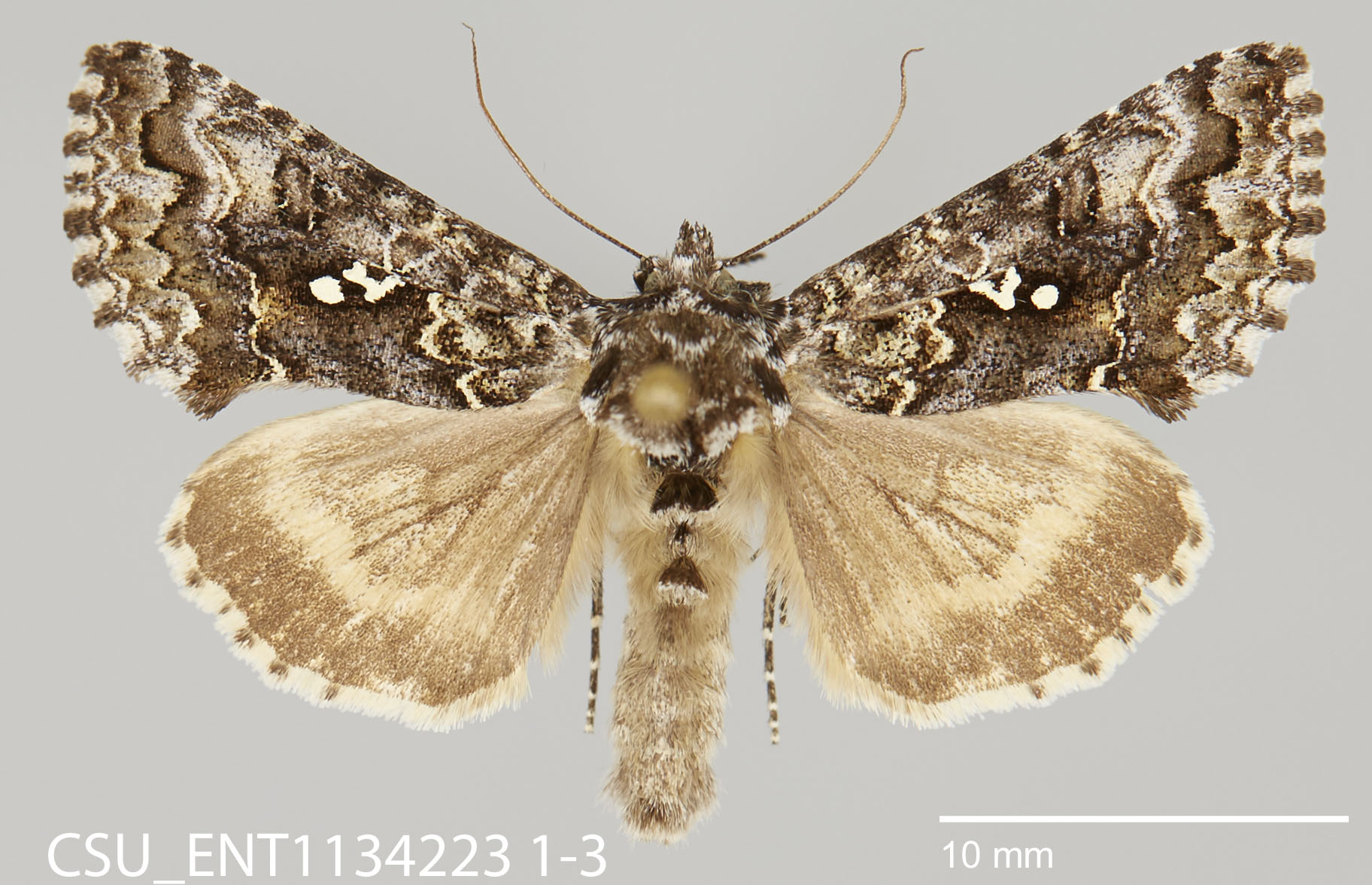

Scientific classification
- Domain: Eukaryota
- Kingdom: Animalia
- Phylum: Arthropoda
- Class: Insecta
- Order: Lepidoptera
- Superfamily: Noctuoidea
- Family: Noctuidae
- Genus: Syngrapha
- Species: S. abstrusa

Binomial name
- Syngrapha abstrusa Eichlin & Cunningham, 1978

= Syngrapha abstrusa =

Species of moth

Syngrapha abstrusa, the abstruse false looper, is a moth of the family Noctuidae. The species was first described by Thomas D. Eichlin and Hugh B. Cunningham in 1978. It is found in North America from Newfoundland to New Jersey, southern Canada, Montana and northern New Mexico.

The wingspan is 30–32 mm. The moth flies from June to August depending on the location.

The larvae feed on Picea engelmannii, Picea glauca and Pinus banksiana.
