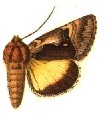

Scientific classification
- Kingdom: Animalia
- Phylum: Arthropoda
- Class: Insecta
- Order: Lepidoptera
- Superfamily: Noctuoidea
- Family: Noctuidae
- Genus: Syngrapha
- Species: S. sackenii

Binomial name
- Syngrapha sackenii (Grote, 1877)

Synonyms
- Plusia sackenii Grote, 1877; Syngrapha sacceni Hampson, 1913; Plusia snowii H. Edwards, 1884; Syngrapha snowii (H. Edwards, 1884); Syngrapha snovi Hampson, 1913

= Syngrapha sackenii =

Species of moth

Syngrapha sackenii is a moth of the family Noctuidae. It is found in the Rocky Mountains from south-western Montana to north-eastern Utah, New Mexico and Colorado.

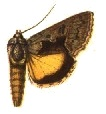
