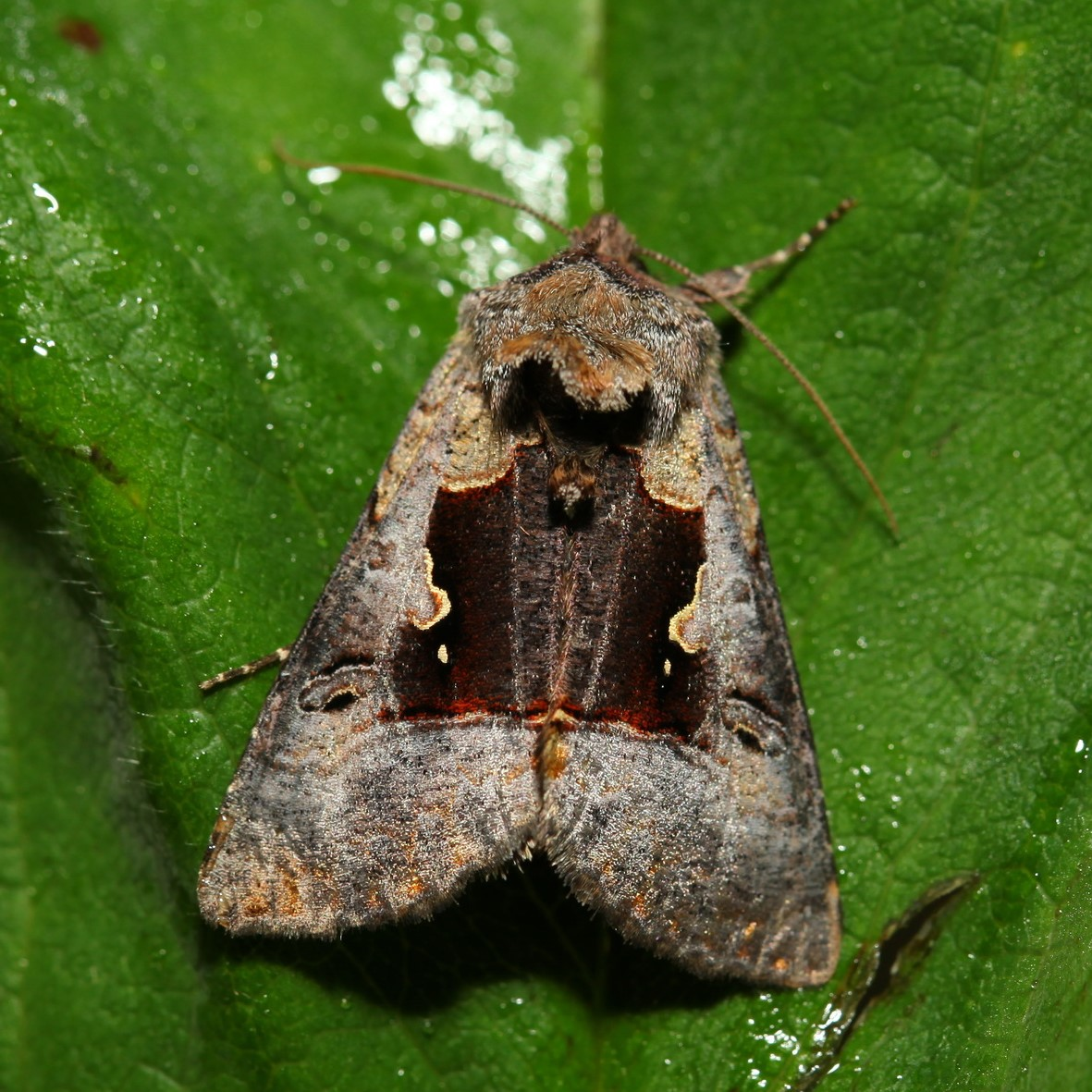

Scientific classification
- Kingdom: Animalia
- Phylum: Arthropoda
- Class: Insecta
- Order: Lepidoptera
- Superfamily: Noctuoidea
- Family: Noctuidae
- Genus: Syngrapha
- Species: S. diasema

Binomial name
- Syngrapha diasema (Boisduval, 1829)

Synonyms
- Plusia diasema Boisduval, 1829; Syngrapha diasema ab. connexa Warren, 1913

= Syngrapha diasema =

Species of moth

Syngrapha diasema is a species of moth in the family Noctuidae that was first described by Jean Baptiste Boisduval in 1829. It is found from northern Fennoscandia to Siberia, across the Arctic and subarctic. In North America, it has been reported across the Arctic and subarctic from Labrador to central Alaska.

The wingspan is 30–33 mm. Adults are on wing in July depending on the location. There is one generation per year.

The larvae feed on Betula species (including Betula nana) and Vaccinium and Populus species, as well as Trollius europaeus.
