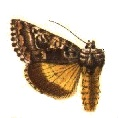

Scientific classification
- Kingdom: Animalia
- Phylum: Arthropoda
- Class: Insecta
- Order: Lepidoptera
- Superfamily: Noctuoidea
- Family: Noctuidae
- Genus: Syngrapha
- Species: S. octoscripta

Binomial name
- Syngrapha octoscripta (Grote, 1874)

Synonyms
- Plusia octoscripta Grote, 1874; Autographa magnifica Ottolengui, 1919

= Syngrapha octoscripta =

Species of moth

Syngrapha octoscripta, the figure-eight looper moth or dusky silver Y, is a moth of the family Noctuidae. The species was first described by Augustus Radcliffe Grote in 1874. It is found in North America from coast to coast in most of Canada south in the east to northern Pennsylvania, Ohio, and the Great Lakes states.

The wingspan is 34–36 mm. Adults are on wing from July to August depending on the location. There is one generation per year.

The larvae feed on Vaccinium species.
