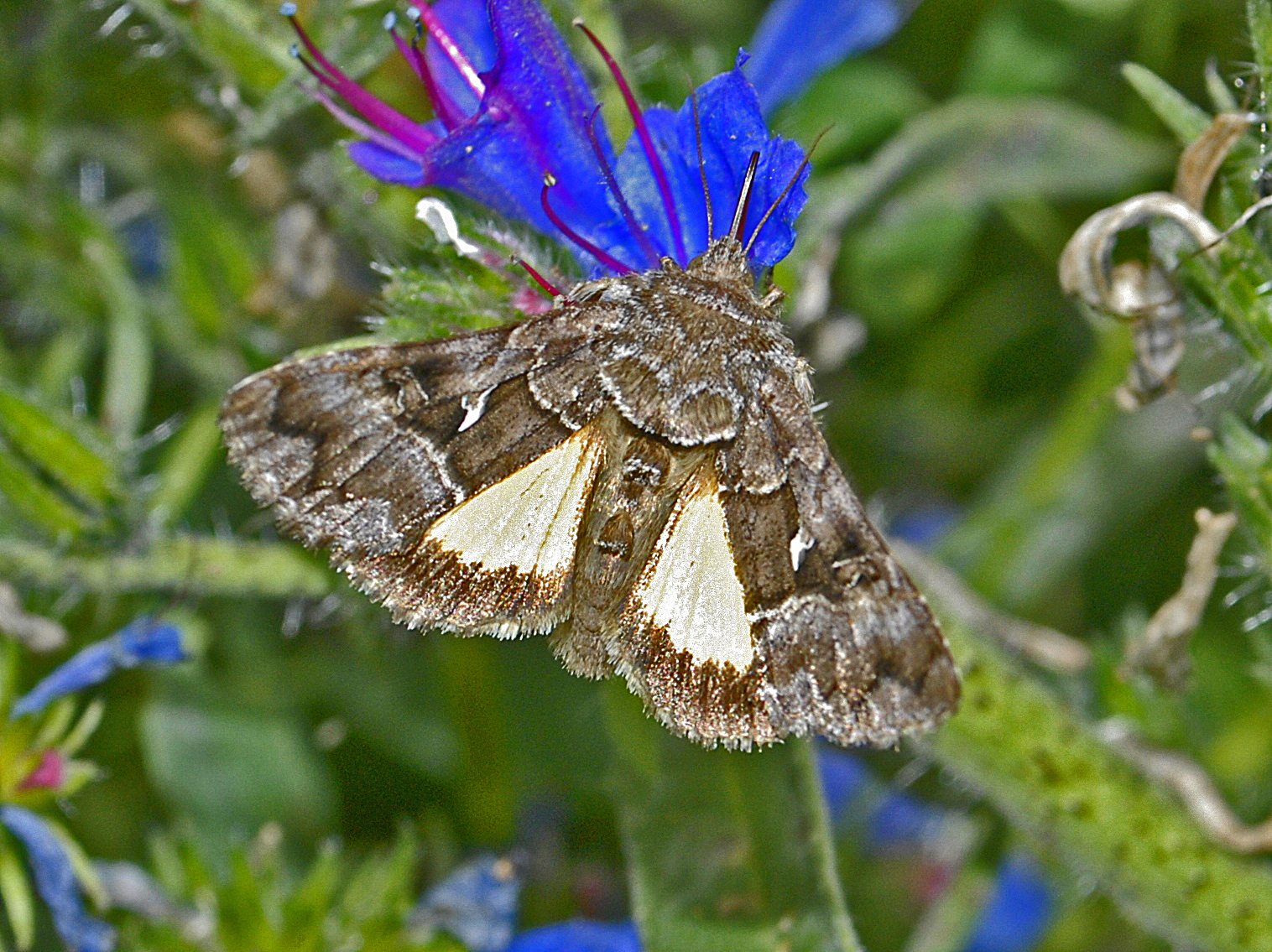
- Syngrapha ain, feeding
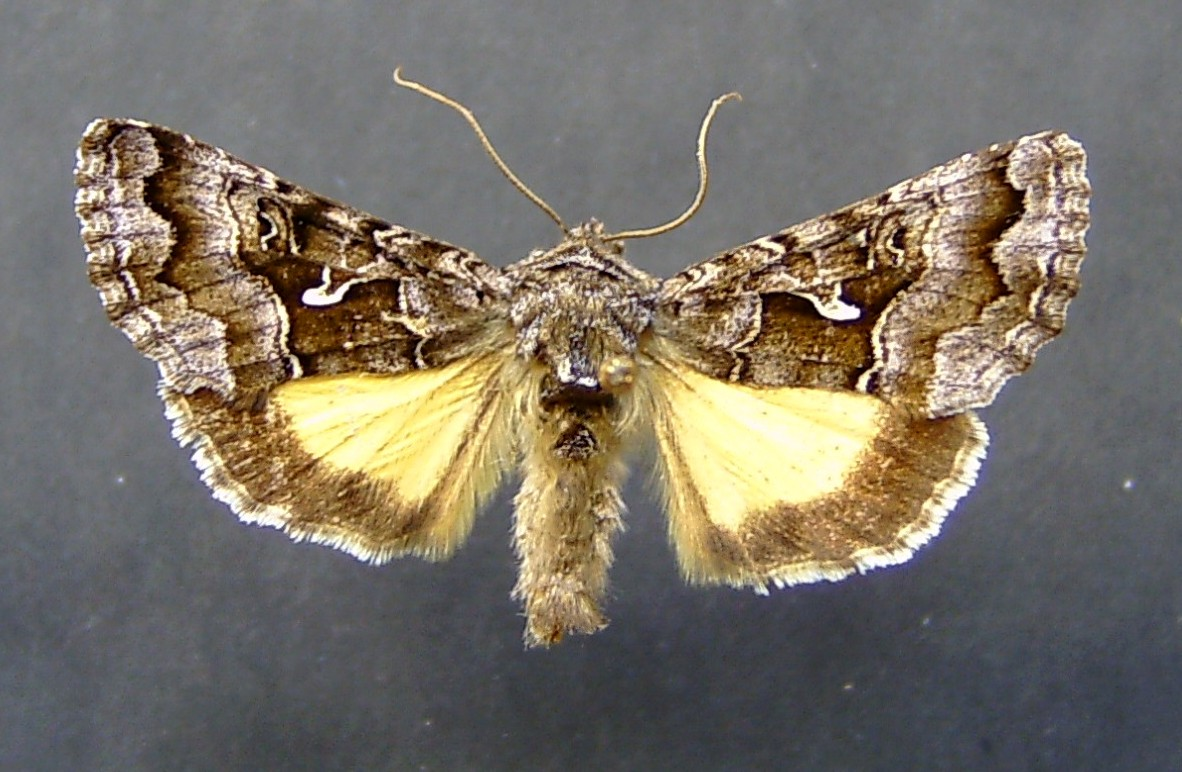
- Mounted specimen

Scientific classification
- Kingdom: Animalia
- Phylum: Arthropoda
- Clade: Pancrustacea
- Class: Insecta
- Order: Lepidoptera
- Superfamily: Noctuoidea
- Family: Noctuidae
- Genus: Syngrapha
- Species: S. ain

Binomial name
- Syngrapha ain (Hochenwarth, 1785)

= Syngrapha ain =

Species of moth

Syngrapha ain is a moth of the family Noctuidae.

== Subspecies ==
- Syngrapha ain ain Ronkay, Ronkay & Behounek, 2008
- Syngrapha ain persibirica Ronkay, Ronkay, Behounek & Mikkola, 2008

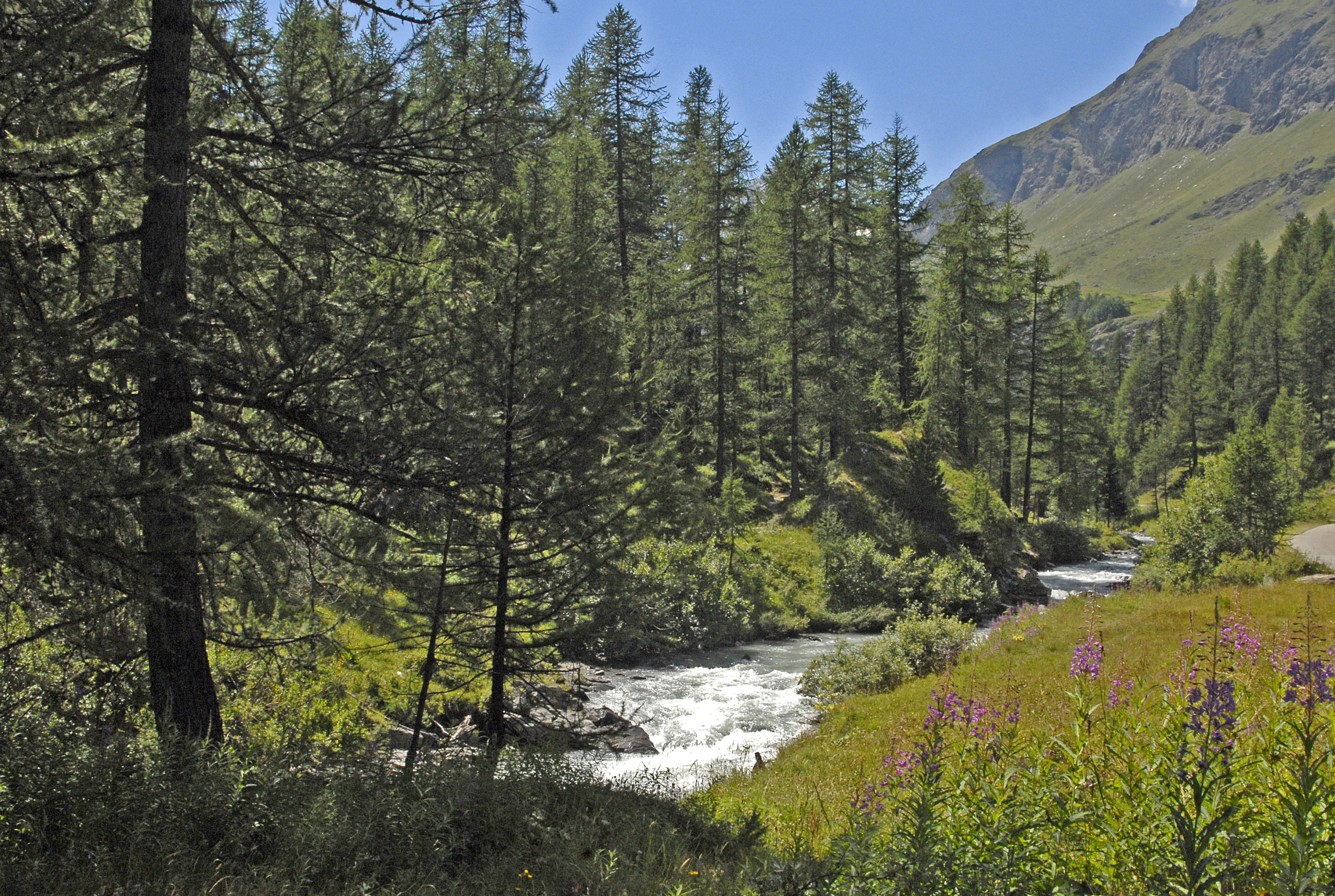
Habitat of S. ain in the Alps: Rhêmes Valley, Valle d’Aosta, abt. 1800 m. a.s.l.

== Description ==
Wingspan 34–40 mm. Ground color of forewing upperside gray-brown, with strongly serrated wavy lines and a distinctive silvery white mark resembling letter gamma. Hindwings yellow, with a wide black border. Thorax hairy with some tufts of hair. Proboscis well developed.

S. ain is a daytime flier, on the wings from July to August, depending on location. Larvae green, with yellowish longitudinal and double dorsal lines. They feed on Larix species. Pupa dark brown.

== Distribution and habitat ==
S. ain is a Eurasiatic species, found locally in subalpine and alpine larch forests of the Alps, northern Carpathians (Krkonoše and Tatra Mts., sporadically also in South Slovakia and North Hungary), then eastwards in southern Ural Mts. and the south of Siberia. In the Far East, it inhabits the Korean Peninsula as well as Japan.
