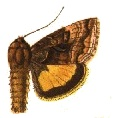

Scientific classification
- Domain: Eukaryota
- Kingdom: Animalia
- Phylum: Arthropoda
- Class: Insecta
- Order: Lepidoptera
- Superfamily: Noctuoidea
- Family: Noctuidae
- Genus: Syngrapha
- Species: S. ignea

Binomial name
- Syngrapha ignea (Grote, 1864)

Synonyms
- Plusia ignea Grote, 1864; Caloplusia ignea

= Syngrapha ignea =

Species of moth

Syngrapha ignea, the mountain beauty, is a moth of the family Noctuidae. The species was first described by Augustus Radcliffe Grote in 1864. It is found from northern Alaska south to southern California and New Mexico, with a disjunct population in Labrador. It is also found sparingly across the boreal forest and the subarctic.

The wingspan is 29–32 mm. Adults are on wing from June to August depending on the location. There is one generation per year.

The larvae feed on Vaccinium and Salix species.

== Subspecies ==
- Syngrapha ignea ignea
- Syngrapha ignea simulans (Labrador, northern Quebec)
