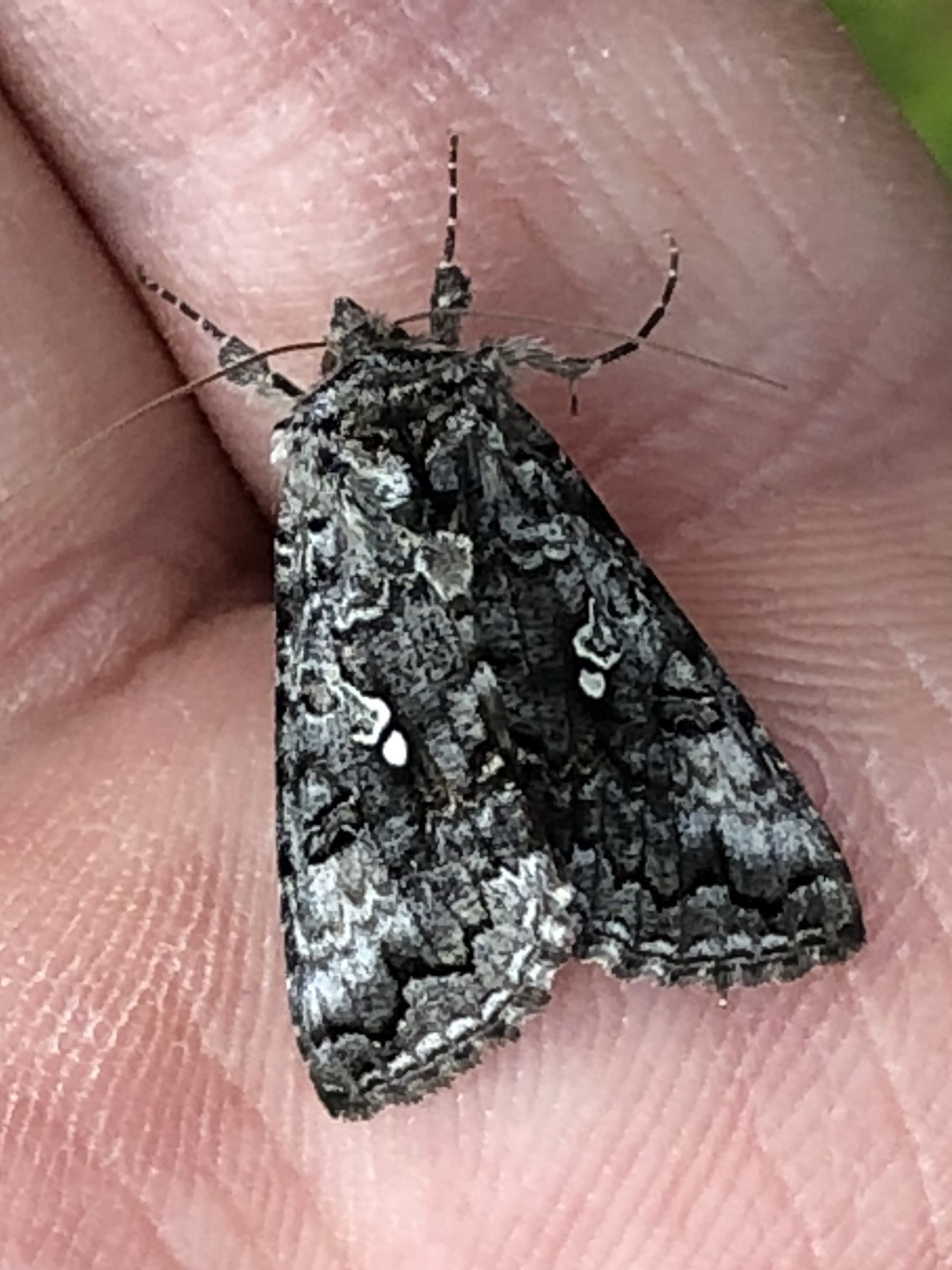

Scientific classification
- Kingdom: Animalia
- Phylum: Arthropoda
- Clade: Pancrustacea
- Class: Insecta
- Order: Lepidoptera
- Superfamily: Noctuoidea
- Family: Noctuidae
- Genus: Syngrapha
- Species: S. altera

Binomial name
- Syngrapha altera Ottolengui, 1902

Synonyms
- Autographa altera

= Syngrapha altera =

Species of moth

Syngrapha altera is a species of moth in the family Noctuidae. It is found from Newfoundland to Manitoba and Northern Michigan.

The wingspan is 30–34 mm.

== Subspecies ==
There are two recognised subspecies:

- Syngrapha altera altera
- Syngrapha altera variana (from Maine to Newfoundland)
