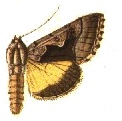

Scientific classification
- Kingdom: Animalia
- Phylum: Arthropoda
- Class: Insecta
- Order: Lepidoptera
- Superfamily: Noctuoidea
- Family: Noctuidae
- Genus: Syngrapha
- Species: S. orophila

Binomial name
- Syngrapha orophila (Hampson, 1908)

Synonyms
- Plusia orophila Hampson, 1908

= Syngrapha orophila =

Species of moth

Syngrapha orophila is a moth of the family Noctuidae first described by George Hampson in 1908. It is found in western North America from extreme northern British Columbia and the Queen Charlotte Islands, south and east to southern Oregon, western Wyoming and Montana and western Alberta.

The wingspan is 34–36 mm. Adults are on wing in July depending on the location. There is one generation per year.

The larvae feed on Vaccinium species.
