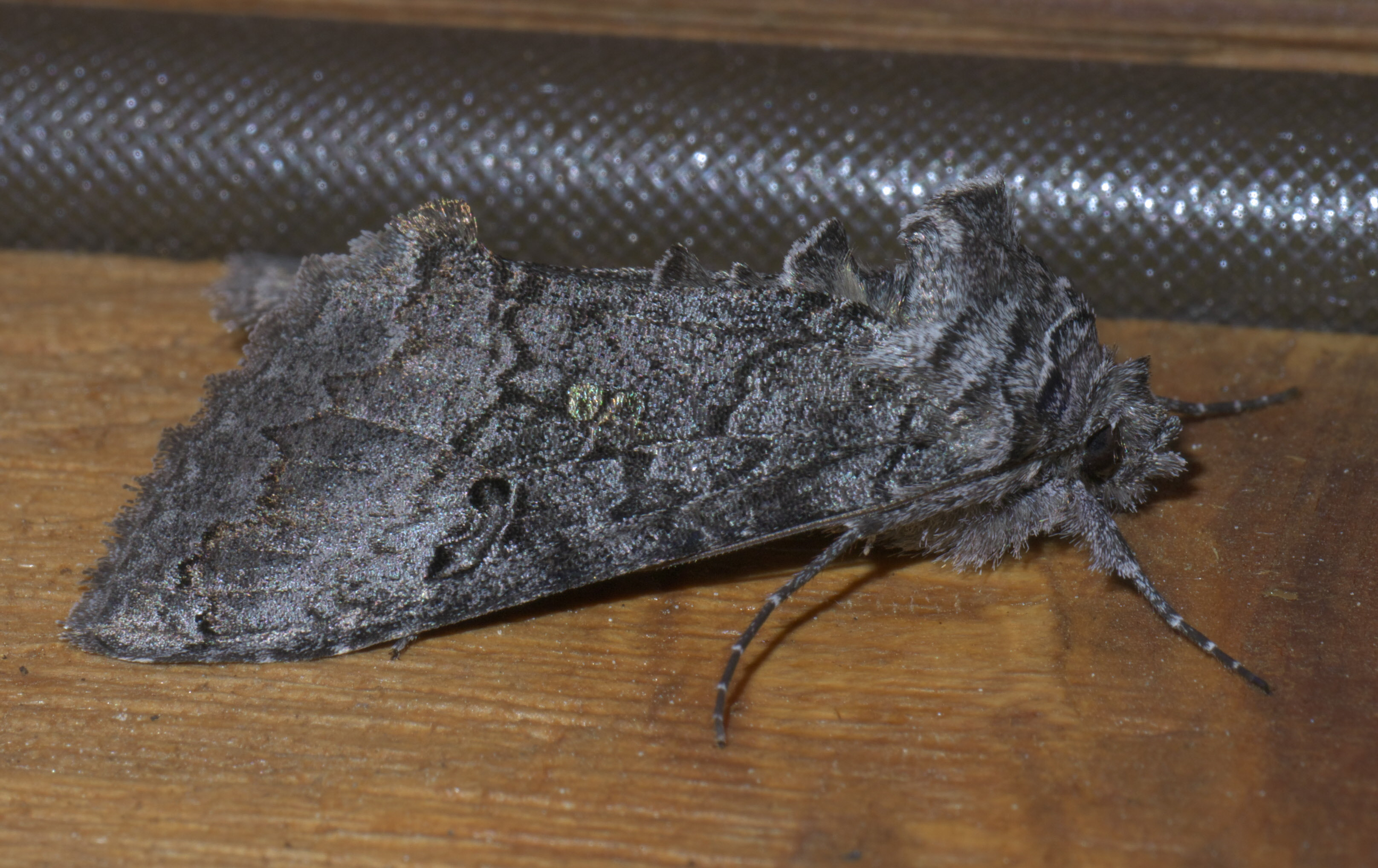

Scientific classification
- Kingdom: Animalia
- Phylum: Arthropoda
- Clade: Pancrustacea
- Class: Insecta
- Order: Lepidoptera
- Superfamily: Noctuoidea
- Family: Noctuidae
- Genus: Syngrapha
- Species: S. viridisigma

Binomial name
- Syngrapha viridisigma (Grote, 1874)

= Syngrapha viridisigma =

Species of moth

Syngrapha viridisigma, known generally as the spruce false looper or green-marked looper, is a species of looper moth in the family Noctuidae. It is found in North America.

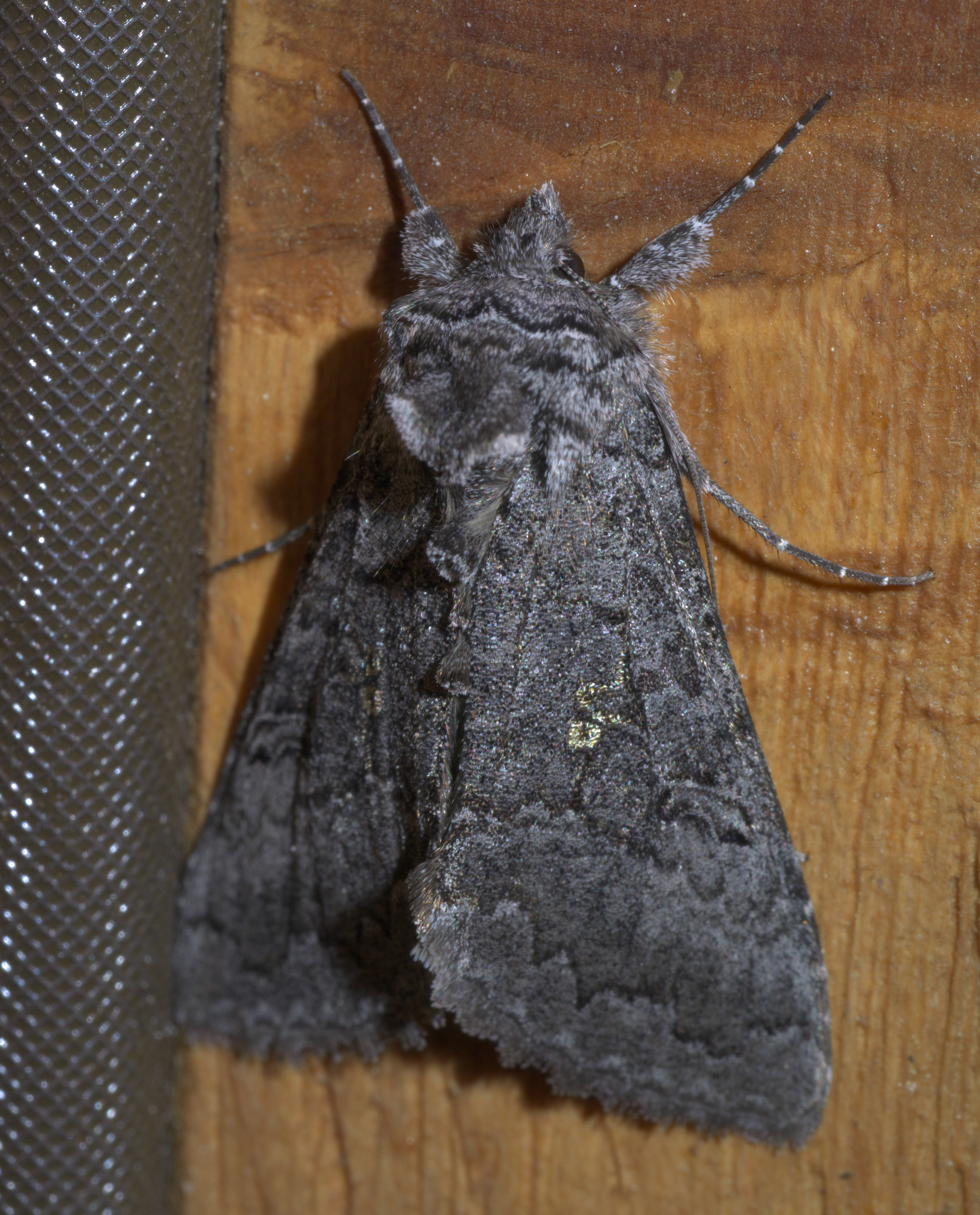
Spruce false looper, Syngrapha viridisigma
