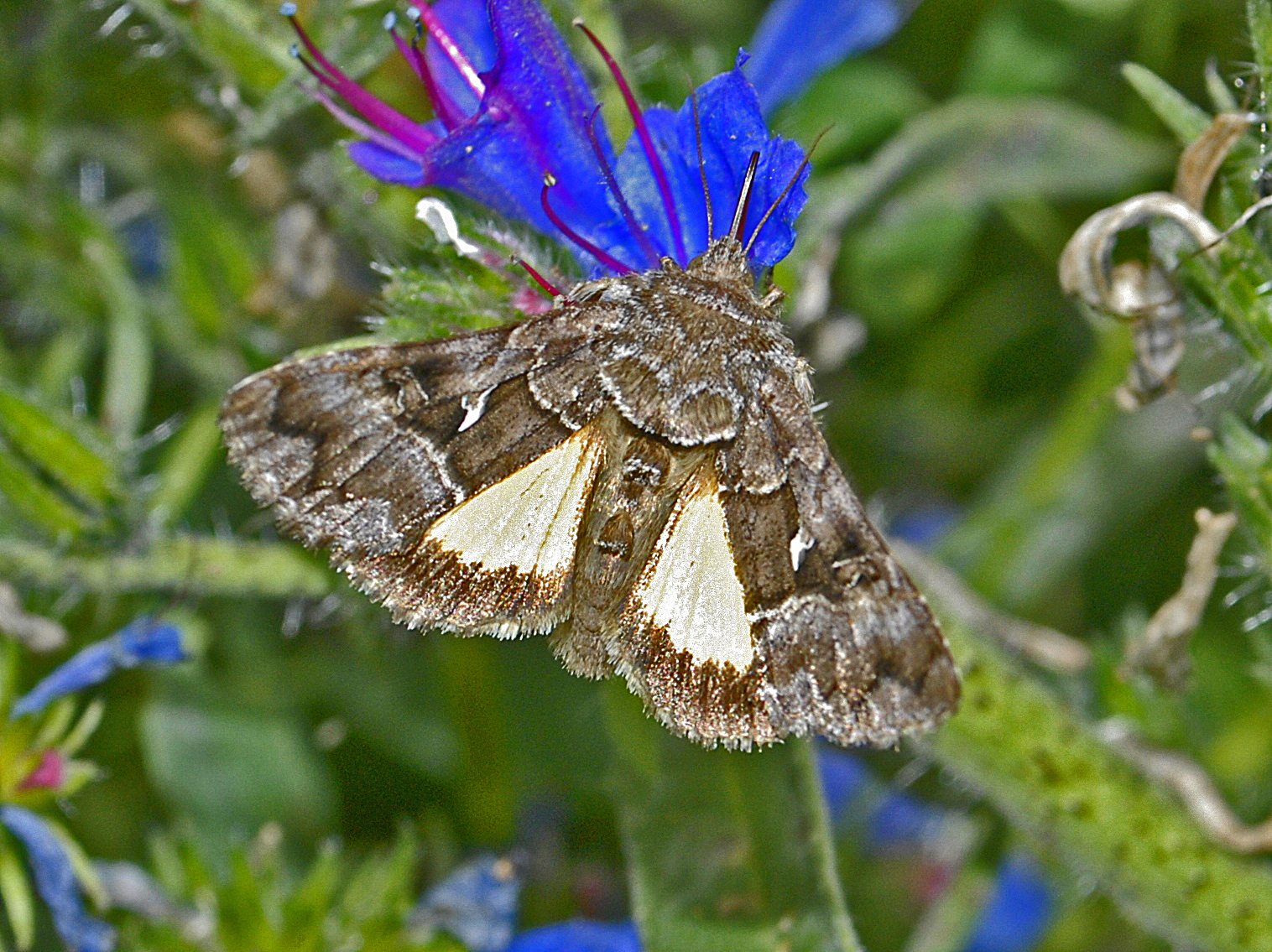
- Syngrapha ain

Scientific classification
- Kingdom: Animalia
- Phylum: Arthropoda
- Clade: Pancrustacea
- Class: Insecta
- Order: Lepidoptera
- Superfamily: Noctuoidea
- Family: Noctuidae
- Subtribe: Plusiina
- Genus: Syngrapha; Hübner, [1821]

Synonyms
- Aingrapha Beck, 1991; Caloplusia Smith, 1884; Diasyngrapha Beck, 1991; Microsyngrapha Beck, 1991; Palaeographa Klyuchko, 1983; Parsyngrapha Beck, 1991

= Syngrapha =

Genus of moths

Syngrapha is a genus of moths of the family Noctuidae.

== Species ==
- Syngrapha abstrusa Eichlin & Cunningham, 1978
- Syngrapha ain Hochenwarth, 1785
- Syngrapha alias (Ottolengui, 1902)
- Syngrapha altera Ottolengui, 1902
- Syngrapha alticola Walker, [1858]
- Syngrapha angulidens Smith, 1891
- Syngrapha borea Aurivillius, 1890 (syn: Syngrapha lula Strand, 1917)
- Syngrapha celsa (H. Edwards, 1881)
- Syngrapha composita Warren, 1913
- Syngrapha cryptica Eichlin & Cunningham, 1978
- Syngrapha devergens Hübner, [1813]
- Syngrapha diasema Boisduval, 1829
- Syngrapha epigaea Grote, 1874
- Syngrapha gilarovi Klyuchko, 1983
- Syngrapha hochenwarthi Hochenwarth, 1785
- Syngrapha ignea Grote, 1864
- Syngrapha interrogationis Linnaeus, 1758
- Syngrapha microgamma Hübner, [1823]
- Syngrapha montana Packard, 1869
- Syngrapha octoscripta Grote, 1874
- Syngrapha orophila Hampson, 1908
- Syngrapha ottolenguii Dyar, 1903
- Syngrapha parilis Hübner, [1809]
- Syngrapha rectangula (Kirby, 1837)
- Syngrapha rilaecacuminum Varga & Ronkay, 1982
- Syngrapha sackenii Grote, 1877
- Syngrapha selecta (Walker, [1858])
- Syngrapha surena Grote, 1882
- Syngrapha tibetana Staudinger, 1895
- Syngrapha u-aureum Guenée, 1852
- Syngrapha viridisigma Grote, 1874
