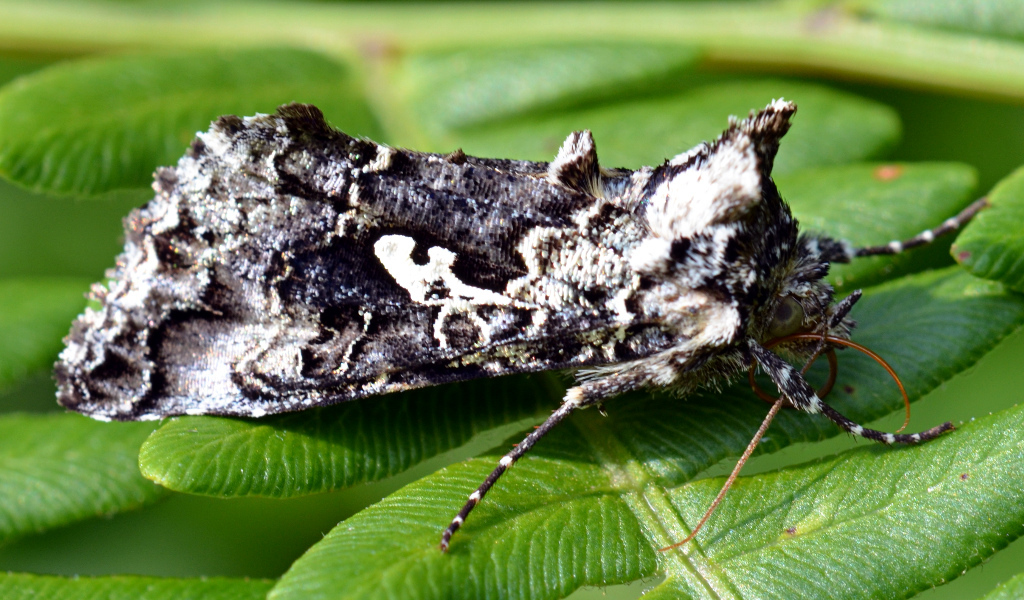

Scientific classification
- Kingdom: Animalia
- Phylum: Arthropoda
- Clade: Pancrustacea
- Class: Insecta
- Order: Lepidoptera
- Superfamily: Noctuoidea
- Family: Noctuidae
- Tribe: Plusiini
- Subtribe: Plusiina
- Genus: Syngrapha
- Species: S. cryptica

Binomial name
- Syngrapha cryptica Eichlin & Cunningham, 1978

= Syngrapha cryptica =

Species of moth

Syngrapha cryptica is a species of looper moth in the family Noctuidae. It is found in North America.
