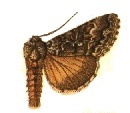

Scientific classification
- Domain: Eukaryota
- Kingdom: Animalia
- Phylum: Arthropoda
- Class: Insecta
- Order: Lepidoptera
- Superfamily: Noctuoidea
- Family: Noctuidae
- Genus: Syngrapha
- Species: S. alias

Binomial name
- Syngrapha alias (Ottolengui, 1902)

Synonyms
- Autographa alias; Autographa interalia

= Syngrapha alias =

Species of moth

Syngrapha alias, the hooked silver Y, is a moth of the family Noctuidae. The species was first described by Rodrigues Ottolengui in 1902. It is found in North America from Newfoundland to Alaska and Vancouver Island, north to near the treeline and south in the west to coastal north California and Arizona, in the east to North Carolina.

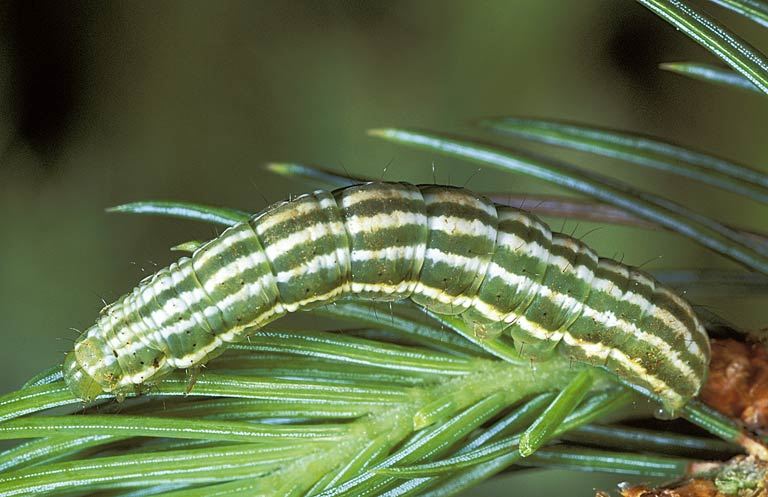
Caterpillar

The wingspan is 30–34 mm. The moth flies from June to August depending on the location.

The larvae feed on Picea glauca and Picea mariana.

== Subspecies ==
There are two recognised subspecies:

- Syngrapha alias alias
- Syngrapha alias interalia
