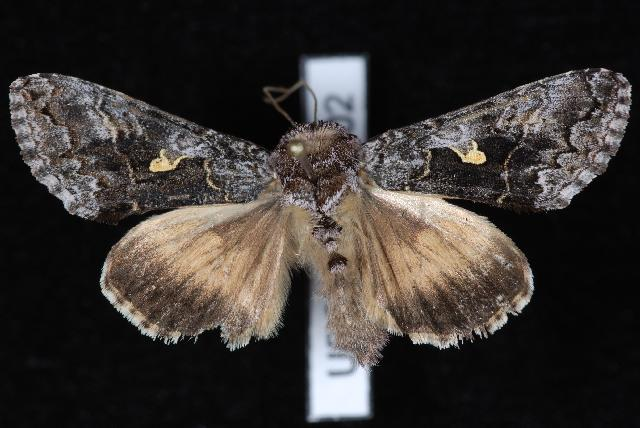

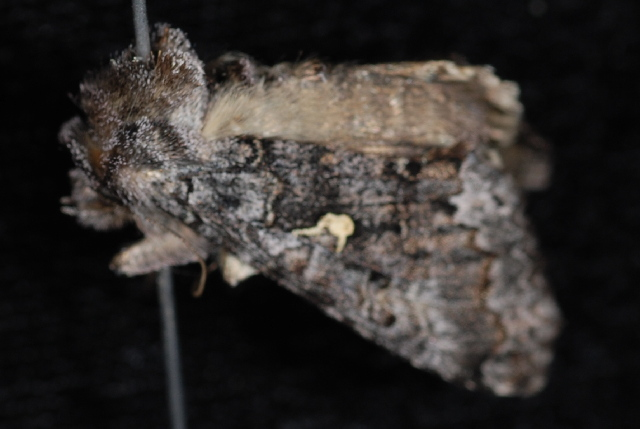

Scientific classification
- Domain: Eukaryota
- Kingdom: Animalia
- Phylum: Arthropoda
- Class: Insecta
- Order: Lepidoptera
- Superfamily: Noctuoidea
- Family: Noctuidae
- Genus: Syngrapha
- Species: S. celsa

Binomial name
- Syngrapha celsa H. Edwards, 1881

Synonyms
- Plusia celsa; Syngrapha octoscripta ab. beta; Syngrapha altera ab. alterana

= Syngrapha celsa =

Species of moth

Syngrapha celsa, the plain silver Y or western conifer looper, is a moth of the family Noctuidae. The species was first described by Henry Edwards in 1881. It is found in North America from British Columbia to California, Idaho, Nevada, Arizona and New Mexico.

The wingspan is 34–38 mm. Adults fly from July to September depending on the location.

The larvae feed on Abies lasiocarpa, Abies grandis, Abies concolor, Picea egelmannii, Picea glauca, Pinus monticola and Tsuga heterophylla.

== Subspecies ==
There are two recognised subspecies:

- Syngrapha celsa celsa
- Syngrapha celsa sierra
