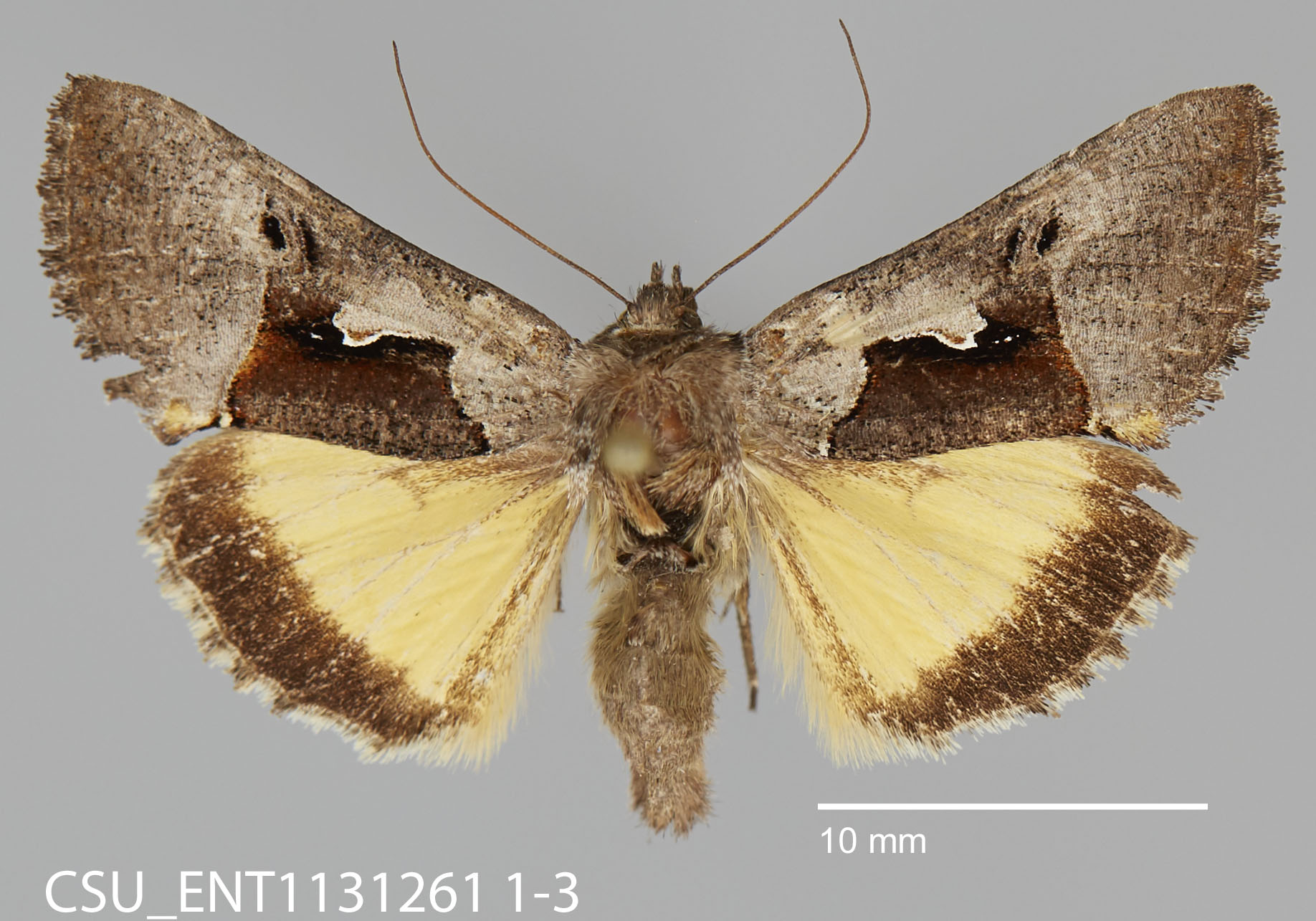

Scientific classification
- Domain: Eukaryota
- Kingdom: Animalia
- Phylum: Arthropoda
- Class: Insecta
- Order: Lepidoptera
- Superfamily: Noctuoidea
- Family: Noctuidae
- Genus: Syngrapha
- Species: S. borea

Binomial name
- Syngrapha borea (Aurivillius, 1890)

Synonyms
- Syngrapha lula Strand, 1917

= Syngrapha borea =

Species of moth

Syngrapha borea is a species of looper moth in the family Noctuidae. It is found in North America.
