= Syngrapha alticola =

Scientific classification
- Kingdom: Animalia
- Phylum: Arthropoda
- Clade: Pancrustacea
- Class: Insecta
- Order: Lepidoptera
- Superfamily: Noctuoidea
- Family: Noctuidae
- Genus: Syngrapha
- Species: S. alticola

Binomial name
- Syngrapha alticola (Walker, [1858])

Synonyms
- Plusia alticola Walker, 1858; Syngrapha devergens alticola; Caloplusia alticola

Species of moth

Syngrapha alticola, the alticola looper moth or alpine beauty, is a moth of the family Noctuidae. The species was first described by Francis Walker in 1858. It is found across the Arctic of North America, above the treeline from Newfoundland to Alaska, south in the mountains to central California and Colorado.

The wingspan is 26–27 mm. Adults are on wing from July to August depending on the location. There are two generations per year.
