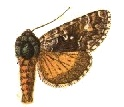

Scientific classification
- Domain: Eukaryota
- Kingdom: Animalia
- Phylum: Arthropoda
- Class: Insecta
- Order: Lepidoptera
- Superfamily: Noctuoidea
- Family: Noctuidae
- Genus: Syngrapha
- Species: S. rectangula

Binomial name
- Syngrapha rectangula Kirby, 1837

Synonyms
- Plusia rectangula; Plusia mortuorum

= Syngrapha rectangula =

Species of moth

Syngrapha rectangula, the salt and pepper looper or angulated cutworm, is a moth of the family Noctuidae. The species was first described by William Kirby in 1837. It is found in North America from Newfoundland, Quebec, northern Ontario to Manitoba, New Jersey, northern Pennsylvania, southern Michigan, northern Wisconsin, North Carolina, Virginia, British Columbia, Alberta, Montana, northern Idaho and the Cascades (Washington and Oregon).

The wingspan is 32–35 mm. The moth flies from July to August depending on the location.

The larvae feed on Abies balsamea, Tsuga heterophylla, Picea glauca and Pseudotsuga menziesii.

== Subspecies ==
There are two recognised subspecies:

- Syngrapha rectangula rectangula
- Syngrapha rectangula nargenta
