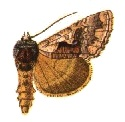

Scientific classification
- Domain: Eukaryota
- Kingdom: Animalia
- Phylum: Arthropoda
- Class: Insecta
- Order: Lepidoptera
- Superfamily: Noctuoidea
- Family: Noctuidae
- Genus: Syngrapha
- Species: S. epigaea

Binomial name
- Syngrapha epigaea (Grote, 1874)

Synonyms
- Plusia epigaea Grote, 1874

= Syngrapha epigaea =

Species of moth

Syngrapha epigaea, the pirate looper moth or narrow silver Y, is a moth of the family Noctuidae. The species was first described by Augustus Radcliffe Grote in 1874. It is found from coast to coast in Canada south in the east to Pennsylvania, Ohio, and the northern Great Lakes states.

The wingspan is 39–40 mm. Adults are on wing from July to August depending on the location. There is one generation per year.

The larvae feed on Vaccinium angustifolium and Kalmia angustifolia.
