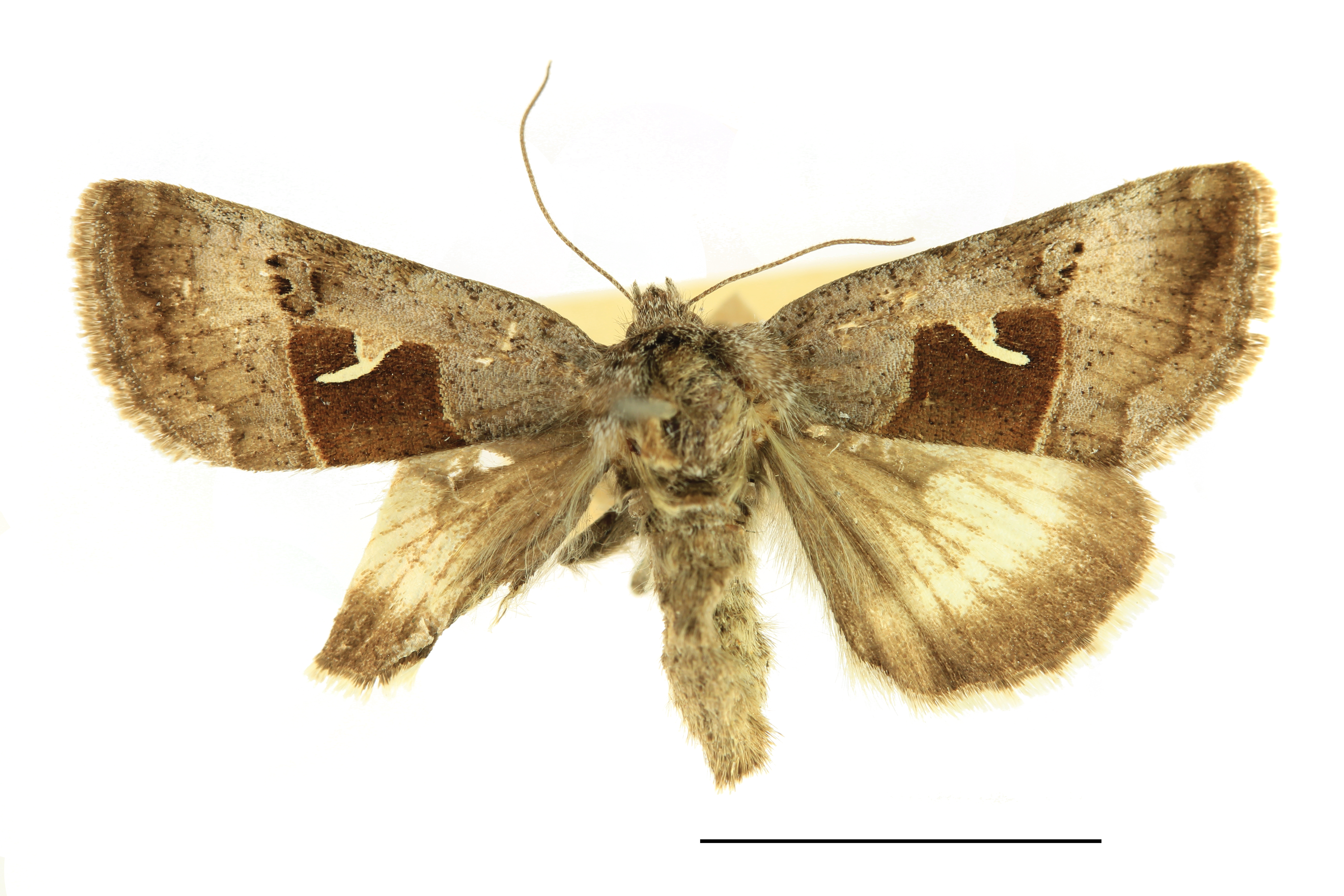

Scientific classification
- Kingdom: Animalia
- Phylum: Arthropoda
- Clade: Pancrustacea
- Class: Insecta
- Order: Lepidoptera
- Superfamily: Noctuoidea
- Family: Noctuidae
- Genus: Syngrapha
- Species: S. parilis

Binomial name
- Syngrapha parilis (Hubner, 1809)

= Syngrapha parilis =

Species of moth

Syngrapha parilis is a species of looper moth in the family Noctuidae. It is found in North America and Europe.
