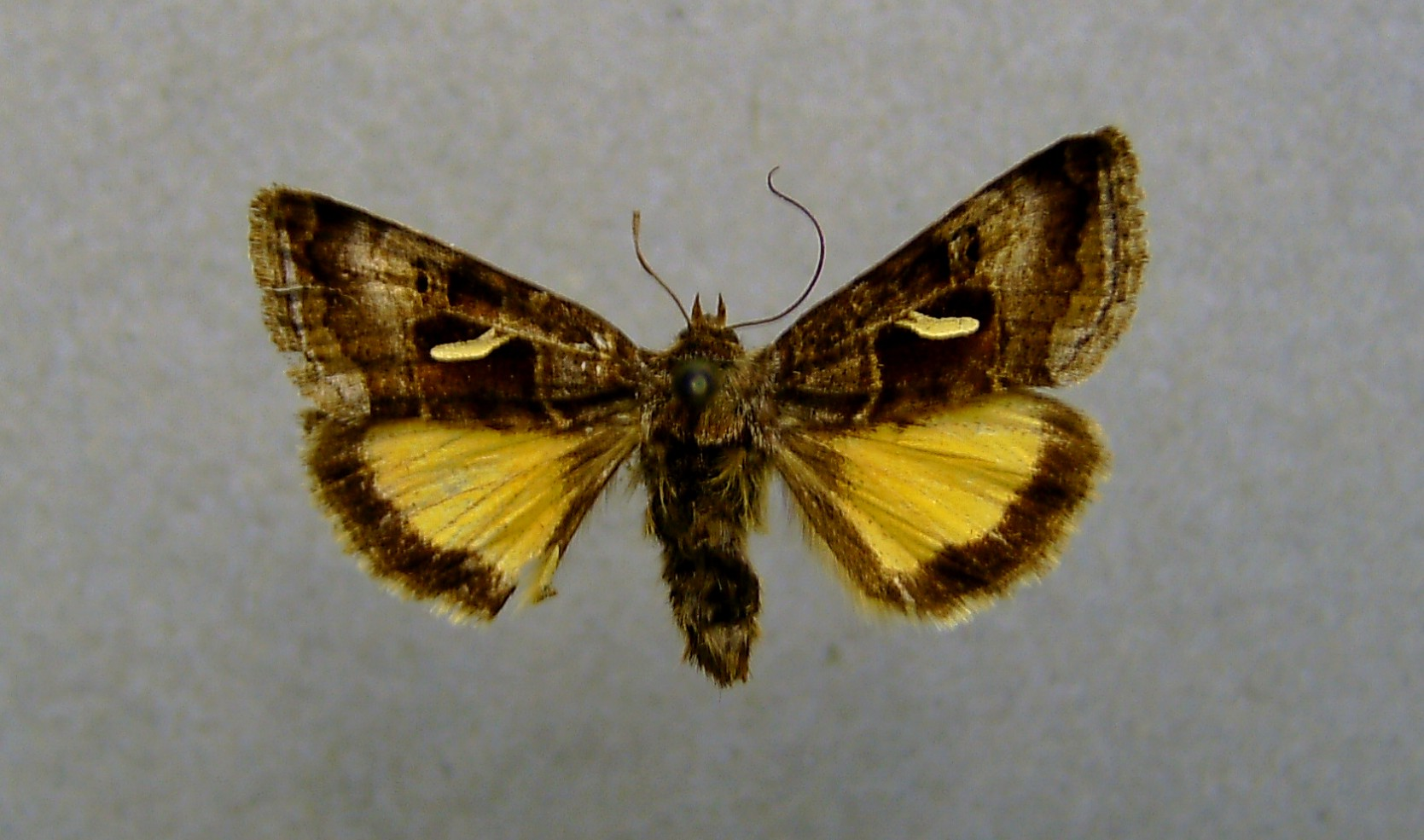

Scientific classification
- Domain: Eukaryota
- Kingdom: Animalia
- Phylum: Arthropoda
- Class: Insecta
- Order: Lepidoptera
- Superfamily: Noctuoidea
- Family: Noctuidae
- Genus: Syngrapha
- Species: S. hochenwarthi

Binomial name
- Syngrapha hochenwarthi (Hochenwarth, 1785)

Synonyms
- Phalaena hochenwarthi; Noctua divergens; Catoplusia hochenvarthi; Plusia hochenwarthi; Plusia hochenwarthi var. insignata; Caloplusia hochenwarthi

= Syngrapha hochenwarthi =

Species of moth

Syngrapha hochenwarthi is a moth of the family Noctuidae. It is found in the Alps (on height of 1700 to 2500 m), the mountainous areas of Northern Norway and Finland, the Ural Mountains, the Balkan, the Caucasus and the Altai Mountains.

The wingspan is 24–30 mm. The moth flies from June to September depending on the location.

The larvae feed on the leaves of several Plantago species.

== Subspecies ==
The following subspecies are recognised:

- Syngrapha hochenwarthi hochenwarthi (Alps)
- Syngrapha hochenwarthi alaica
- Syngrapha hochenwarthi cuprina
- Syngrapha hochenwarthi lapponaris (Northern Scandinavia)
