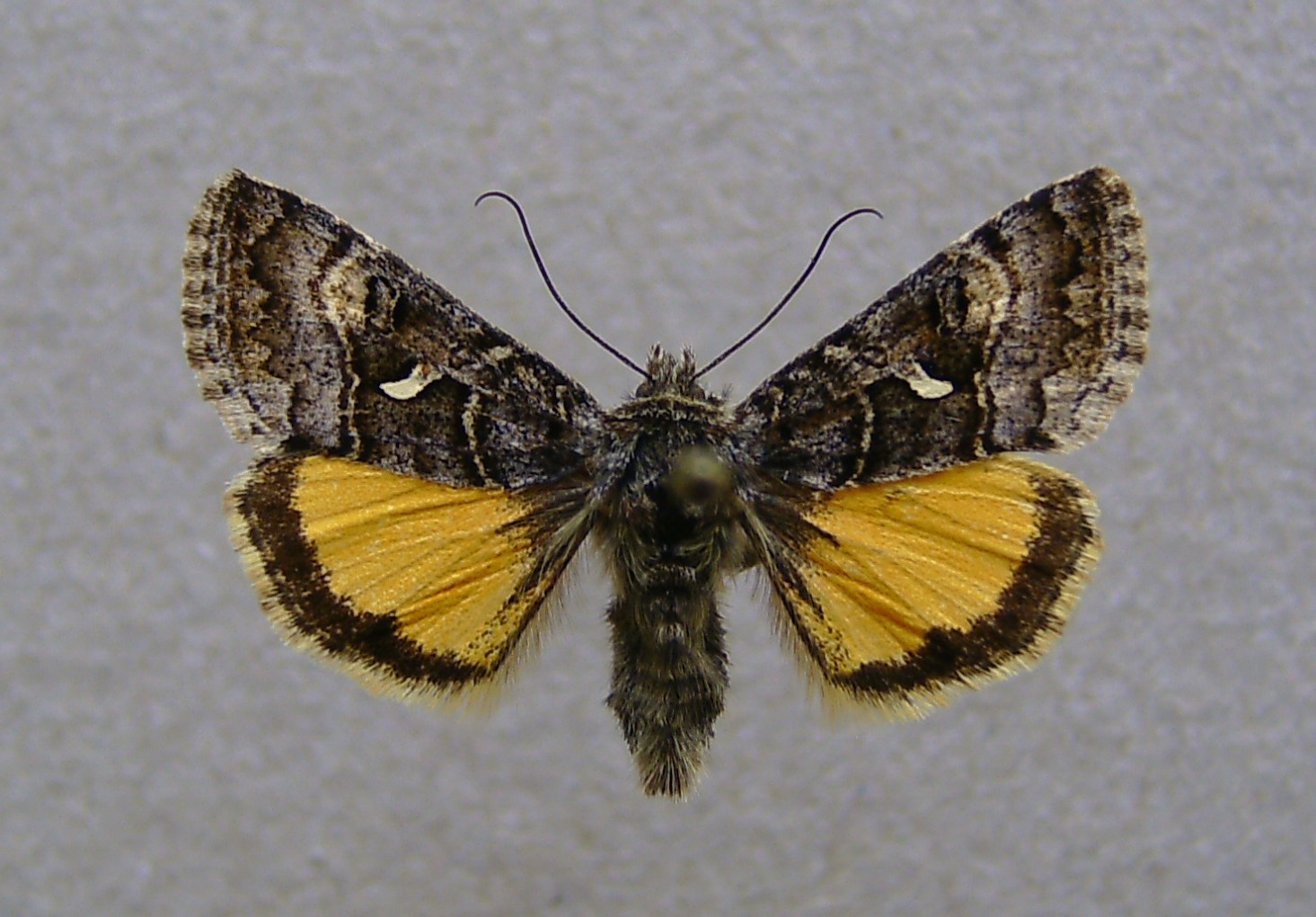

Scientific classification
- Kingdom: Animalia
- Phylum: Arthropoda
- Clade: Pancrustacea
- Class: Insecta
- Order: Lepidoptera
- Superfamily: Noctuoidea
- Family: Noctuidae
- Genus: Syngrapha
- Species: S. devergens

Binomial name
- Syngrapha devergens (Hübner, 1813)

Synonyms
- Noctua devergens Hubner, 1813

= Syngrapha devergens =

Species of moth

Syngrapha devergens is a moth of the family Noctuidae. It is found in the Alps, the Tian Shan Mountains and the Altai Mountains

The wingspan is 29–31 mm. Adults are on wing from July to August in one generation per year. Adults have been recorded feeding on the flowers of Silene species.

The larvae feed on the leaves of Silene, Plantago, Viola and Geum species. They are red-brown with yellow stripes. The larvae overwinter twice.
