= Syngrapha composita =

Scientific classification
- Domain: Eukaryota
- Kingdom: Animalia
- Phylum: Arthropoda
- Class: Insecta
- Order: Lepidoptera
- Superfamily: Noctuoidea
- Family: Noctuidae
- Genus: Syngrapha
- Species: S. composita

Binomial name
- Syngrapha composita Warren, 1913

Synonyms
- Caloplusia composita

Species of moth

Syngrapha composita is a moth of the family Noctuidae.
