= List of noctuid genera: C =

The huge moth family Noctuidae contains the following genera:

A B C D E F G H I J K L M N O P Q R S T U V W X Y Z

- Cabralia
- Cacofota
- Cadiorapa
- Caduca
- Caecila
- Caenurgia
- Caeshadena
- Caffristis
- Calamia
- Calamistis
- Calanomogyna
- Calesia
- Calesidesma
- Calesiodes
- Calicula
- Callargyra
- Callegaria
- Callhyccoda
- Callicereon
- Calliergis
- Calligraphidia
- Callingura
- Calliocloa
- Calliodes
- Callipyris
- Callistege
- Callixena
- Calloecia
- Callophisma
- Callopistria
- Calloruza
- Callostolis
- Callostrotia
- Callyna
- Calocea
- Calocestra
- Calocharia
- Calocucullia
- Calogramma
- Calophasia
- Calophasidia
- Caloplusia
- Caloxestia
- Calpiformis
- Calpoparia
- Calydia
- Calymma
- Calymnia
- Calymniodes
- Calymniops
- Calyptis
- Calyptra
- Camphypena
- Campometra
- Camptocrossa
- Camptylochila
- Campydelta
- Canatha
- Canthylidia
- Capelica
- Caphornia
- Capillamentum
- Capis
- Capitaria
- Capnistis
- Capnodes
- Caradana
- Caradjia
- Caradrina
- Carandana
- Caranilla
- Caranusca
- Carbona
- Carcharoda
- Cardalena
- Cardepia
- Cardiestra
- Cardiosace
- Carelis
- Carillade
- Cariona
- Carissa
- Carmara
- Caroga
- Carpheria
- Carpholithia
- Carsina
- Carteia
- Carteris
- Caryonopera
- Casamba
- Casandria
- Casperia
- Cassania
- Castanasta
- Catabapta
- Catabena
- Catada
- Catadella
- Catadoides
- Catalana
- Cataloxia
- Catamecia
- Catamelas
- Catasema
- Catephia
- Catephiodes
- Catephiona
- Catoblemma
- Catocala
- Caularis
- Cauninda
- Cautaeschra
- Cautatha
- Cecharismena
- Ceilodiastrophon
- Celaena
- Celagyris
- Celeopsyche
- Celiptera
- Cellacrinata
- Cenigria
- Centrartha
- Centrochlora
- Centrogone
- Cephalospargeta
- Cephena
- Ceramica
- Cerapoda
- Cerapteryx
- Ceraptila
- Cerastis
- Cerathosia
- Ceratostrotia
- Cerbia
- Cercosimma
- Cerma
- Cerocala
- Ceroctena
- Ceromacra
- Cerviplusia
- Cetola
- Chabora
- Chabuata
- Chadaca
- Chaetaglaea
- Chaetoloma
- Chaetostephana
- Chalcamistis
- Chalciope
- Chalcoecia
- Chalconyx
- Chalcopasta
- Chalenata
- Chalestra
- Chamaeclea
- Chamyla
- Chamyna
- Chamyris
- Chamyrisilla
- Chandata
- Chaograptis
- Chara
- Charanyca
- Charanyctycia
- Charierges
- Charitosemia
- Charmodia
- Charoblemma
- Chasmina
- Chasminodes
- Chazaria
- Checupa
- Cheillophota
- Cheirophanes
- Chelaprora
- Chelecala
- Chelichares
- Cheligalea
- Chelonomorpha
- Chera
- Chersotis
- Chibidokuga
- Chichimeca
- Chilkasa
- Chilodes
- Chionoxantha
- Chirconia
- Chiripha
- Chitasida
- Chlanidophora
- Chloantha
- Chloridea
- Chlorocleptria
- Chlorocodia
- Chlorognesia
- Chlorograpta
- Chlorothalpa
- Chlorothrix
- Chobata
- Chodda
- Choephora
- Choeropais
- Cholimma
- Choluata
- Chopardiana
- Chorizagrotis
- Chorsia
- Chortodes
- Chrychrysia
- Chrysanympha
- Chrysodeixis
- Chrysoecia
- Chrysograpta
- Chrysonicara
- Chrysopera
- Chrysorithrum
- Chrysozonata
- Chubutiana
- Chusaris
- Chutapha
- Chytobrya
- Chytolita
- Chytonidia
- Chytonix
- Chytoryza
- Cidariplura
- Cilla
- Cingalesa
- Cirphis
- Cirrhia
- Cirrhobolina
- Cirrhophanus
- Cirrodes
- Cirrodiana
- Cirrodistis
- Cirroedia
- Cisaucula
- Cissusa
- Cladenia
- Cladocerotis
- Clapra
- Clapronia
- Clara
- Clargia
- Claterna
- Claudaxylia
- Clavipalpa
- Clavipalpula
- Clemathada
- Cleoceris
- Cleonymia
- Cleophana
- Cleptomita
- Clethrorasa
- Clinophlebia
- Clitis
- Cloniatarphes
- Closteromorpha
- Clytie
- Clytomorpha
- Clytoscopa
- Cnodifrontia
- Coarica
- Cobalos
- Cobubatha
- Coccidiphaga
- Cocytia
- Cocytodes
- Codalithia
- Codonodes
- Coelophoris
- Coeloturatia
- Coenagria
- Coenipeta
- Coenobela
- Coenobia
- Coenophila
- Coenotoca
- Coeriana
- Cofimpacia
- Cola
- Colbusa
- Coleta
- Colnettia
- Colobochyla
- Colocasidia
- Colodes
- Colonsideridis
- Cometaster
- Cometera
- Comocrus
- Comodoria
- Complutia
- Compsenia
- Compsotata
- Conacontia
- Concana
- Condate
- Condica
- Conicochyta
- Conicofrontia
- Conicophoria
- Conisania
- Conistra
- Conochares
- Conochuza
- Conocrana
- Conosema
- Conscitalypena
- Conservula
- Consobrambus
- Constantargyris
- Constantiodes
- Contortivena
- Convercala
- Copablepharon
- Copanarta
- Cophanta
- Copibryophila
- Copicucullia
- Copidryas
- Copifrontia
- Copihadena
- Copipanolis
- Copiphana
- Copitarsia
- Copitype
- Copivaleria
- Coptocnemia
- Coranarta
- Corcobara
- Coremagnatha
- Corethrobela
- Corgatha
- Corgathalia
- Coria
- Corisce
- Corna
- Cornutifera
- Cornutiplusia
- Coronta
- Cororthosia
- Corrha
- Corsa
- Cortyla
- Corubia
- Coruncala
- Corynitis
- Corythurus
- Coscaga
- Cosmia
- Cosmodes
- Cosmophila
- Costankia
- Cotanda
- Cotarsina
- Cotuza
- Coxina
- Craccaphila
- Crambiforma
- Crambodes
- Crambophilia
- Crambopsis
- Crameria
- Cranionycta
- Craniophora
- Craptignapa
- Crasia
- Crassagrotis
- Crassivesica
- Craterestra
- Cremnophora
- Crenularia
- Cretonia
- Crimona
- Crinala
- Crinisinus
- Crinocula
- Crioa
- Crionica
- Criophasia
- Cristatopalpus
- Crithote
- Crochiphora
- Crocigrapha
- Cromobergia
- Cropia
- Crosia
- Cruria
- Cruriopsis
- Crusiseta
- Crymodes
- Crymona
- Cryphia
- Cryphioides
- Cryphiomima
- Crypsedra
- Crypsiprora
- Crypsotidia
- Cryptastria
- Cryptocala
- Cryptochrostis
- Cryptochrysa
- Cryptomeria
- Cteipolia
- Ctenoceratoda
- Ctenoplusia
- Ctenostola
- Ctenusa
- Ctenypena
- Ctypansa
- Cuahtemoca
- Cubena
- Cucullia
- Cuculluna
- Culasta
- Culicula
- Cultripalpa
- Cuneisigna
- Cuphanoa
- Cupreosotis
- Curubasa
- Curvatula
- Cutina
- Cyathissa
- Cyclodes
- Cyclopera
- Cyclopis
- Cycloprora
- Cycloprosopus
- Cyclopteryx
- Cydosia
- Cyligramma
- Cymatophoropsis
- Cymoblemma
- Cymodegma
- Cymonia
- Cymosafia
- Cyphocampa
- Cyptonychia
- Cyrebia
- Cyrima
- Cyrtandra
- Cytocanis
- Cytothymia
- Cyttaralopha
