= Chlorothrix =

Chlorothrix is the scientific name of multiple genera and may refer to:

- Chlorothrix (alga), a genus of green algae in the family Ulotrichaceae
- Chlorothrix (bacteria), a Candidatus genus of bacteria
- Chlorothrix (moth), a genus of insects in the family Noctuidae
