= Coremagnatha =

Scientific classification
- Kingdom: Animalia
- Phylum: Arthropoda
- Class: Insecta
- Order: Lepidoptera
- Superfamily: Noctuoidea
- Family: Erebidae
- Subfamily: Herminiinae
- Genus: Coremagnatha; Hampson, 1924

Genus of moths

Coremagnatha is a genus of moths of the family Erebidae. The genus was erected by George Hampson in 1924.

The Global Lepidoptera Names Index gives this name as a synonym of Mamerthes H. Druce, 1891.

== Species ==
- Coremagnatha cyanocraspis Hampson, 1924 Trinidad
- Coremagnatha orionalis (Walker, [1859]) Brazil
