= Catalana vohilava =

Scientific classification
- Kingdom: Animalia
- Phylum: Arthropoda
- Class: Insecta
- Order: Lepidoptera
- Superfamily: Noctuoidea
- Family: Erebidae
- Genus: Catalana
- Species: C. vohilava

Binomial name
- Catalana vohilava Viette, 1954

Species of moth

Catalana vohilava is a moth of the family Noctuidae. It was described by Pierre Viette in 1954. It is found on Madagascar.
