= Cromobergia =

Scientific classification
- Domain: Eukaryota
- Kingdom: Animalia
- Phylum: Arthropoda
- Class: Insecta
- Order: Lepidoptera
- Superfamily: Noctuoidea
- Family: Erebidae
- Subfamily: Calpinae
- Genus: Cromobergia; Bourquin, 1937
- Species: C. teichii

Binomial name
- Cromobergia teichii (Berg, 1885)

Synonyms
- Cromobergia Köhler, 1943

Genus of moths

Cromobergia is a monotypic moth genus of the family Noctuidae erected by Fernando Bourquin in 1937. Its only species, Cromobergia teichii, was first described by Carlos Berg in 1885. It is found in Argentina.

The Global Lepidoptera Names Index and Butterflies and Moths of the World put this genus in the family Erebidae and subfamily Calpinae. The Global Lepidoptera Names Index also gives this name as a synonym of Cabralia Moore, 1882.
