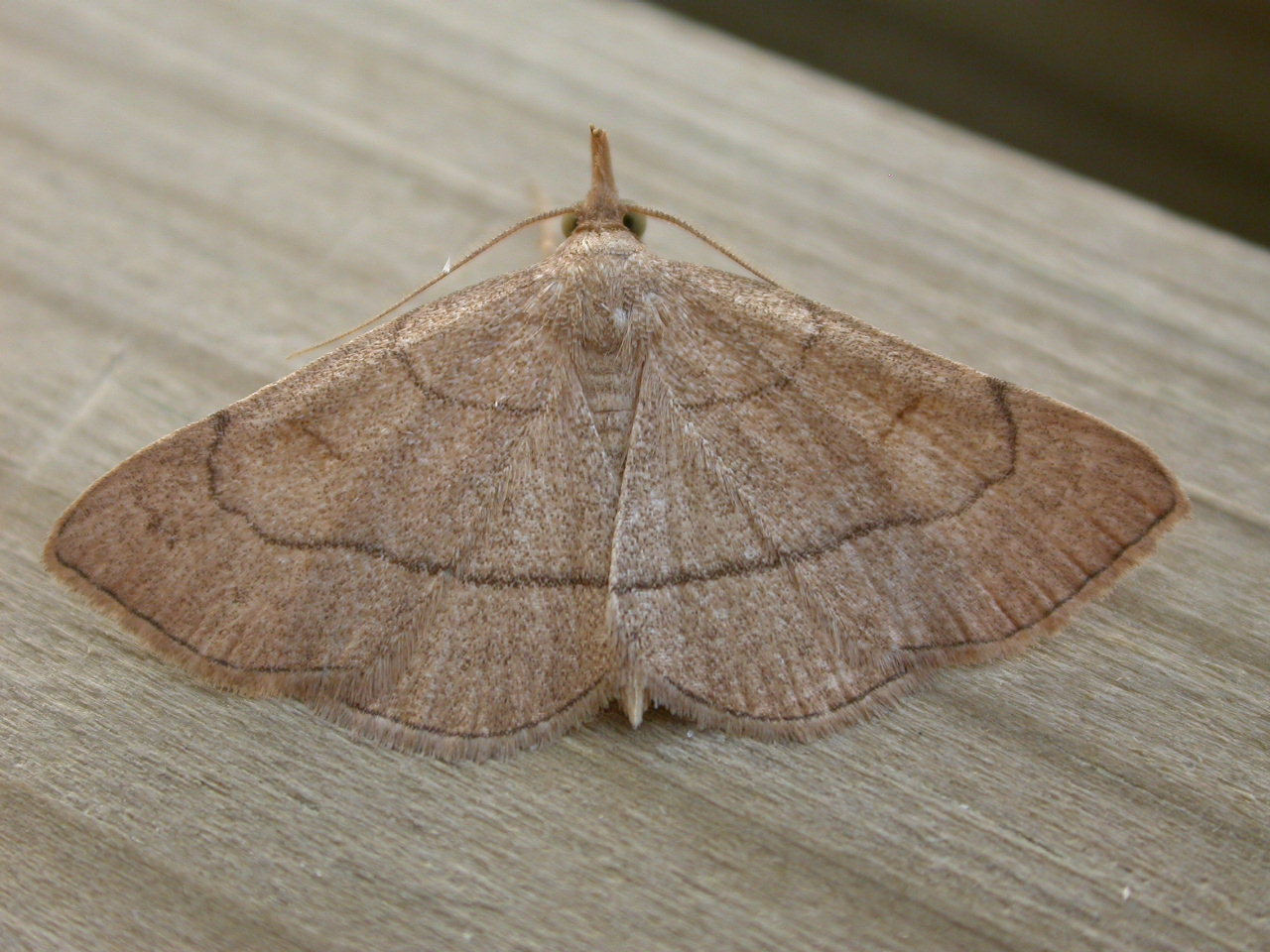

Scientific classification
- Domain: Eukaryota
- Kingdom: Animalia
- Phylum: Arthropoda
- Class: Insecta
- Order: Lepidoptera
- Superfamily: Noctuoidea
- Family: Erebidae
- Genus: Paracolax
- Species: P. tristalis

Binomial name
- Paracolax tristalis (Fabricius, 1794)

= Paracolax tristalis =

Species of moth

Paracolax tristalis, the clay fan-foot, is a litter moth of the family Erebidae. The species was first described by Johan Christian Fabricius in 1794. It is found in the Palearctic realm.

The wingspan is 28–35 mm. The moth flies from June to August depending on the location.

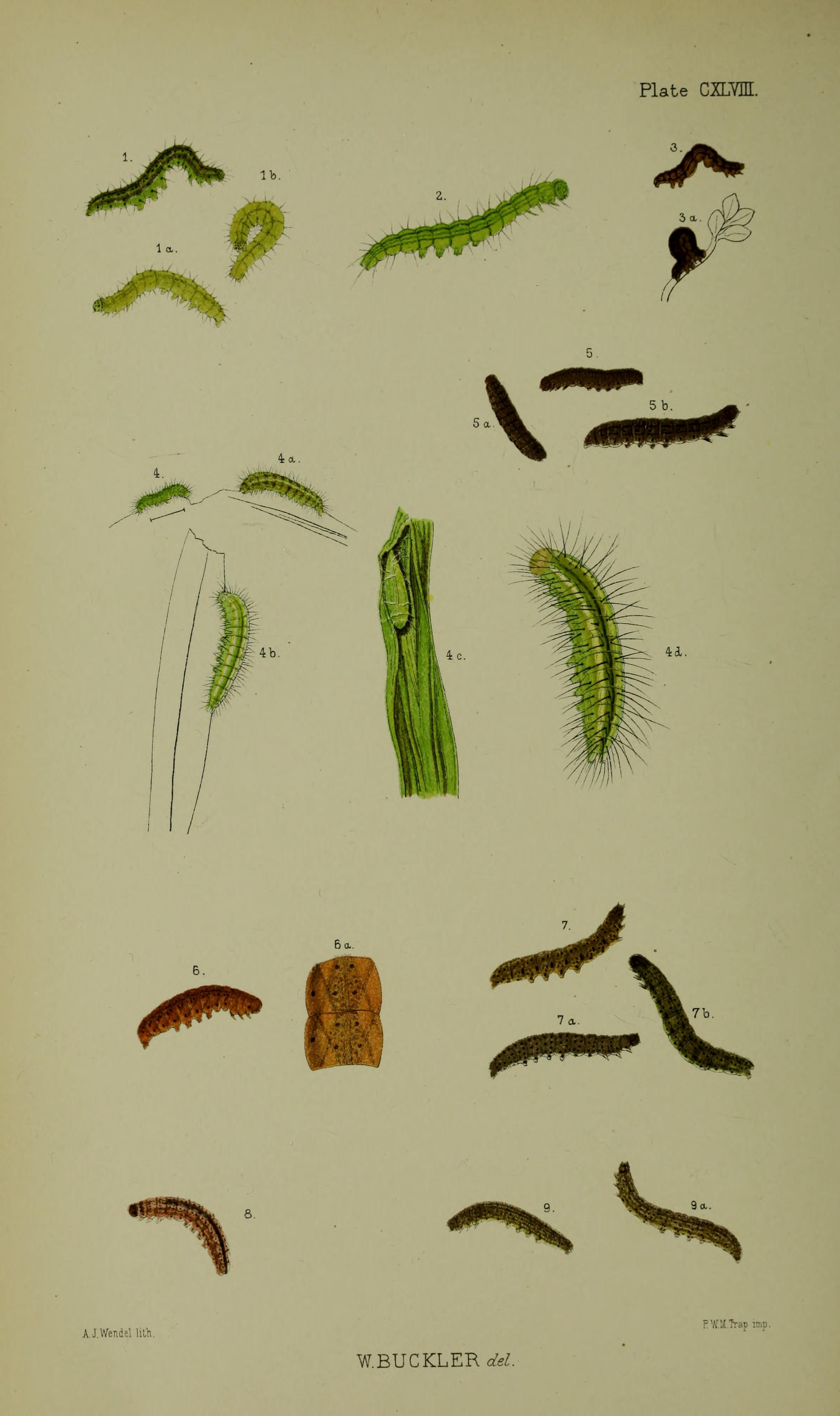
Figs. 5, 5a, 5b larvae in various stages of growth

The larvae feed on various shrubs and deciduous trees.
