= Catalana sandrangato =

Scientific classification
- Kingdom: Animalia
- Phylum: Arthropoda
- Class: Insecta
- Order: Lepidoptera
- Superfamily: Noctuoidea
- Family: Erebidae
- Genus: Catalana
- Species: C. sandrangato

Binomial name
- Catalana sandrangato Viette, 1961

Species of moth

Catalana sandrangato is a moth of the family Noctuidae. It was described by Viette in 1961. It is found on Madagascar.
