= Carsina =

Scientific classification
- Kingdom: Animalia
- Phylum: Arthropoda
- Class: Insecta
- Order: Lepidoptera
- Superfamily: Noctuoidea
- Family: Erebidae
- Subfamily: Calpinae
- Genus: Carsina; Hampson, 1924

Genus of moths

Carsina is a genus of moths of the family Erebidae. The genus was erected by George Hampson in 1924.

== Species ==
- Carsina bifasciata Wileman, 1914
- Carsina enervis Swinhoe, 1890
- Carsina flavibrunnea Hampson, 1895
- Carsina kanshireiensis Wileman, 1914
- Carsina mandarina Leech, 1900
- Carsina obliqua Moore, 1867
- Carsina undulifera Hampson, 1926

Lepidoptera and Some Other Life Forms gives this name as a synonym of Blasticorhinus Butler, 1893.
