= Callophisma =

Scientific classification
- Kingdom: Animalia
- Phylum: Arthropoda
- Class: Insecta
- Order: Lepidoptera
- Superfamily: Noctuoidea
- Family: Noctuidae (?)
- Subfamily: Catocalinae
- Genus: Callophisma; Hampson, 1913

Genus of moths

Callophisma is a genus of moths of the family Noctuidae. The genus was erected by George Hampson in 1913.

- Callophisma flavicornis Hampson, 1913
- Callophisma viettei Laporte, 1975
