= Copibryophila =

Scientific classification
- Domain: Eukaryota
- Kingdom: Animalia
- Phylum: Arthropoda
- Class: Insecta
- Order: Lepidoptera
- Superfamily: Noctuoidea
- Family: Noctuidae
- Genus: Copibryophila; J. B. Smith, 1900
- Species: C. angelica

Binomial name
- Copibryophila angelica Smith, 1900

Genus of moths

Copibryophila is a monotypic moth genus of the family Noctuidae. Its only species, Copibryophila angelica, is found in the US state of California. Both the genus and species were first described by John Bernhardt Smith in 1900.
