= Cuphanoa =

Scientific classification
- Domain: Eukaryota
- Kingdom: Animalia
- Phylum: Arthropoda
- Class: Insecta
- Order: Lepidoptera
- Superfamily: Noctuoidea
- Family: Noctuidae
- Genus: Cuphanoa

Genus of moths

Cuphanoa is a genus of moths in the family Noctuidae. The species of this genus are of dull color, and have frequent blossoming sallows in early spring. The proboscis and palpi are rather short, but the third joint of the latter, though short, is visible. The legs are short and very hairy. These moths are usually called "Quakers" by collectors. They bear a general resemblance to the Bombyces and were classed with them by some older writers. They are moths with stout, hairy bodies, and the abdomen, which extends a little beyond the hind wings, is obtuse in the male and more or less pointed in the female.
