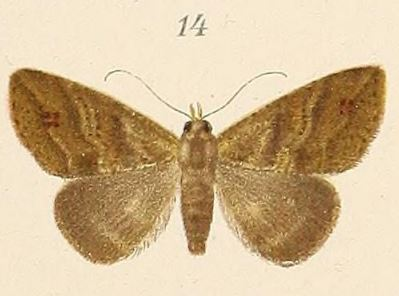

Scientific classification
- Domain: Eukaryota
- Kingdom: Animalia
- Phylum: Arthropoda
- Class: Insecta
- Order: Lepidoptera
- Superfamily: Noctuoidea
- Family: Erebidae
- Subfamily: Calpinae
- Genus: Cycloprosopus; Gaede, 1939
- Species: C. strigifera

Binomial name
- Cycloprosopus strigifera (Pagenstecher, 1907)

= Cycloprosopus =

Genus of moths

Cycloprosopus is a monotypic moth genus of the family Erebidae erected by Max Gaede in 1939. Its only species, Cycloprosopus strigifera, was first described by Arnold Pagenstecher in 1907. It is known from Madagascar.
