= Cloniatarphes =

Scientific classification
- Domain: Eukaryota
- Kingdom: Animalia
- Phylum: Arthropoda
- Class: Insecta
- Order: Lepidoptera
- Superfamily: Noctuoidea
- Family: Erebidae
- Subfamily: Herminiinae
- Genus: Cloniatarphes; Schaus, 1916
- Species: C. carunalis

Binomial name
- Cloniatarphes carunalis Schaus, 1916

Genus of moths

Cloniatarphes is a monotypic moth genus of the family Erebidae. Its only species, Cloniatarphes carunalis, is found in Brazil. Both the genus and the species were first described by William Schaus in 1916.
