= Coscaga =

Scientific classification
- Domain: Eukaryota
- Kingdom: Animalia
- Phylum: Arthropoda
- Class: Insecta
- Order: Lepidoptera
- Superfamily: Noctuoidea
- Family: Erebidae
- Subfamily: Herminiinae
- Genus: Coscaga; Schaus, 1906
- Species: C. picatalis

Binomial name
- Coscaga picatalis (Schaus, 1906)

Synonyms
- Aristaria picatalis Schaus, 1906; Coscaga angulata Schaus, 1906

Genus of moths

Coscaga is a monotypic moth genus of the family Erebidae. Its only species, Coscaga picatalis, is found in Mexico. Both the genus and the species were first described by William Schaus in 1906.
