= Cymodegma =

Scientific classification
- Domain: Eukaryota
- Kingdom: Animalia
- Phylum: Arthropoda
- Class: Insecta
- Order: Lepidoptera
- Superfamily: Noctuoidea
- Family: Noctuidae (?)
- Subfamily: Catocalinae
- Genus: Cymodegma; Tams, 1935
- Species: C. buxtoni

Binomial name
- Cymodegma buxtoni Tams, 1935

Genus of moths

Cymodegma is a monotypic moth genus of the family Noctuidae. Its only species, Cymodegma buxtoni, is found in Samoa. Both the genus and the species were first described by Tams in 1935. The higher classification is given as NOCTUOIDEA : NOCTUIDAE : CATOCALINAE.
