= Chlorograpta =

Scientific classification
- Kingdom: Animalia
- Phylum: Arthropoda
- Class: Insecta
- Order: Lepidoptera
- Superfamily: Noctuoidea
- Family: Erebidae
- Subfamily: Calpinae
- Genus: Chlorograpta; Hampson, 1926
- Species: C. variegata

Binomial name
- Chlorograpta variegata (Walker, 1866)

Genus of moths

Chlorograpta is a monotypic moth genus of the family Erebidae erected by George Hampson in 1926. Its only species, Chlorograpta variegata, was first described by Francis Walker in 1866. It is found in Sierra Leone.
