= Caryonopera =

Scientific classification
- Kingdom: Animalia
- Phylum: Arthropoda
- Class: Insecta
- Order: Lepidoptera
- Superfamily: Noctuoidea
- Family: Erebidae
- Subfamily: Calpinae
- Genus: Caryonopera; Hampson, 1926

Genus of moths

Caryonopera is a genus of moths of the family Erebidae. The genus was erected by George Hampson in 1926.

== Species ==
- Caryonopera bergeri Berio, 1956
- Caryonopera breviramia Hampson, 1926
- Caryonopera gabunalis Holland, 1894
- Caryonopera mainty Viette, 1972
- Caryonopera malgassica Berio, 1955
- Caryonopera moenasalis Walker, 1858
- Caryonopera pyrrholopha Fletcher, 1961
- Caryonopera royi Fletcher & Viette, 1955
- Caryonopera triangularis Bethune-Baker, 1911
