= Cercosimma =

Scientific classification
- Domain: Eukaryota
- Kingdom: Animalia
- Phylum: Arthropoda
- Class: Insecta
- Order: Lepidoptera
- Superfamily: Noctuoidea
- Family: Noctuidae
- Genus: Cercosimma

Genus of moths

Cercosimma is a genus of moths of the family Noctuidae. It includes the subspecies C. electrodes.
