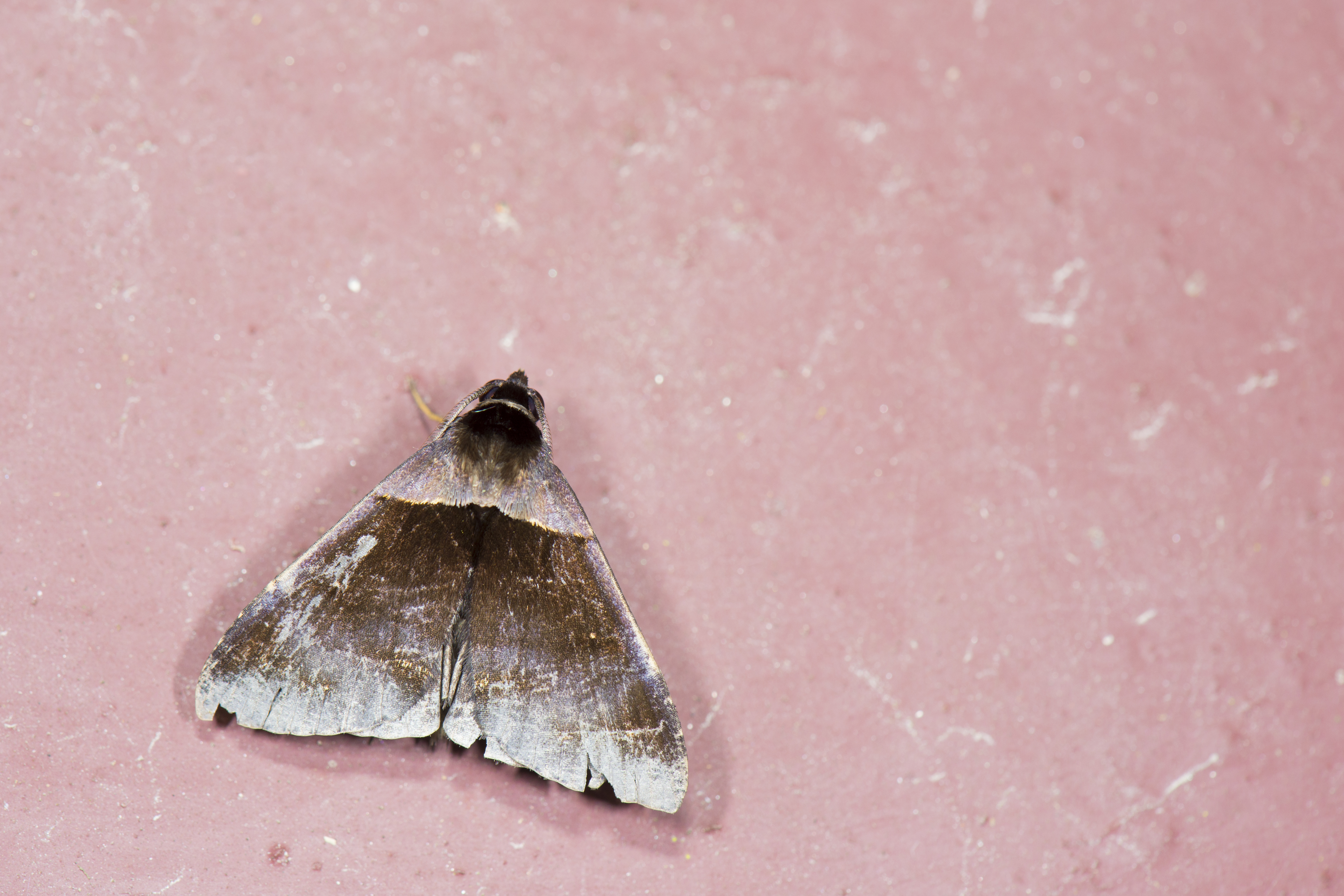

Scientific classification
- Kingdom: Animalia
- Phylum: Arthropoda
- Class: Insecta
- Order: Lepidoptera
- Superfamily: Noctuoidea
- Family: Erebidae
- Subfamily: Calpinae
- Genus: Crithote; Walker, 1864

Synonyms
- Crusiseta Schultze, 1908

= Crithote =

Genus of moths

Crithote is a genus of moths of the family Noctuidae. The genus was erected by Francis Walker in 1864.

== Species ==
- Crithote horripides Walker, 1864
- Crithote pannicula (Swinhoe, 1904)
- Crithote prominens Leech, 1900
