= Corubia =

Scientific classification
- Domain: Eukaryota
- Kingdom: Animalia
- Phylum: Arthropoda
- Class: Insecta
- Order: Lepidoptera
- Superfamily: Noctuoidea
- Family: Erebidae
- Subfamily: Calpinae
- Genus: Corubia; Schaus, 1906
- Species: C. testacea

Binomial name
- Corubia testacea Schaus, 1906

Genus of moths

Corubia is a monotypic moth genus of the family Erebidae. Its only species, Corubia testacea, is found in Brazil. Both the genus and the species were first described by William Schaus in 1906.
