= Ceromacra =

Scientific classification
- Kingdom: Animalia
- Phylum: Arthropoda
- Clade: Pancrustacea
- Class: Insecta
- Order: Lepidoptera
- Superfamily: Noctuoidea
- Family: Erebidae
- Subfamily: Calpinae
- Genus: Ceromacra; Guenée, 1852

Synonyms
- Ipnea Walker, [1859]

Genus of moths

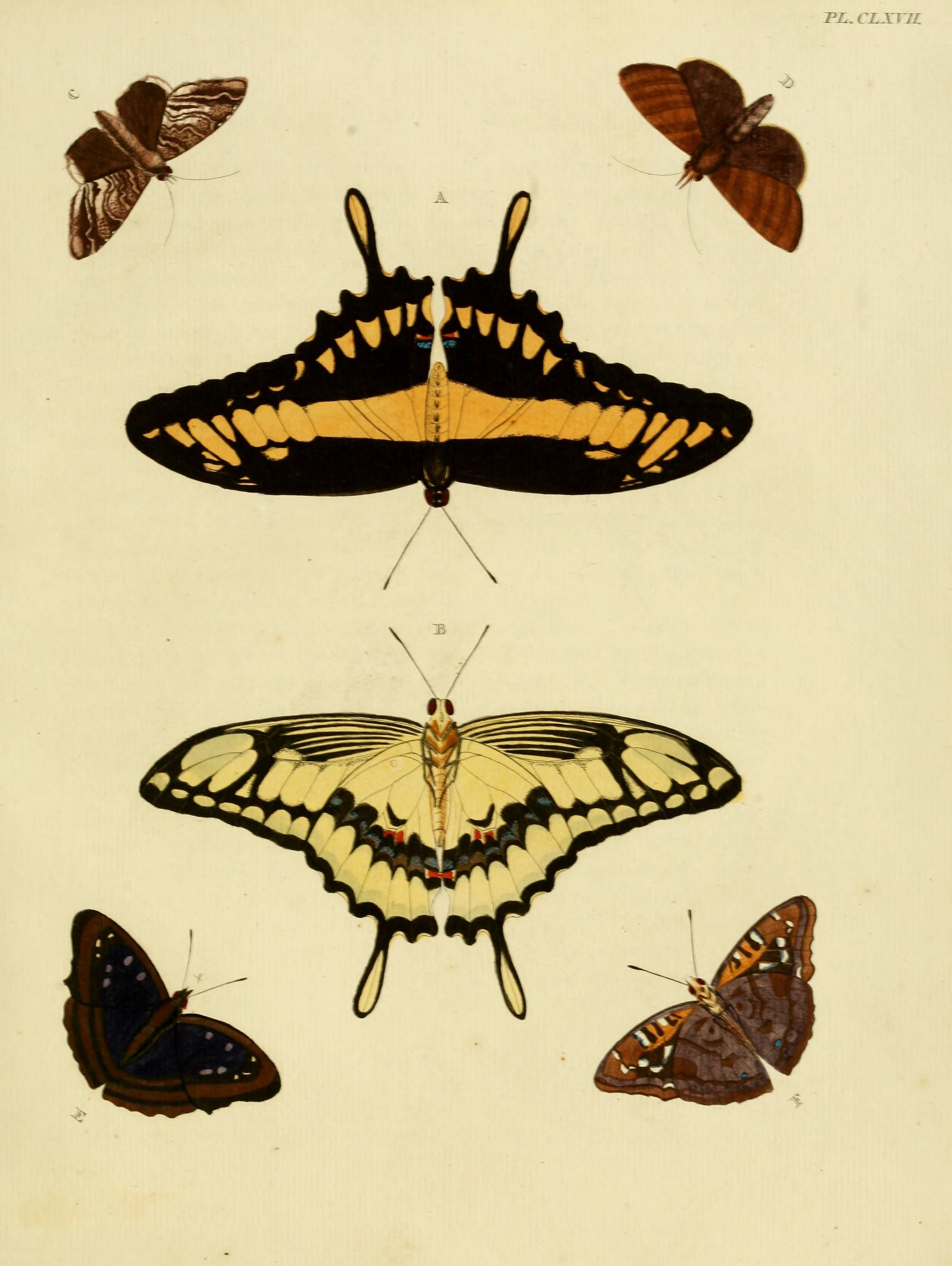
D: "( = Phalaena) Tymber" ( = Ceromacra tymber, iconotype?), see The Global Lepidoptera Names Index, NHM.

Ceromacra is a genus of moths of the family Erebidae, erected by Achille Guenée in 1852.

== Species ==
- Ceromacra cocala Stoll, 1780
- Ceromacra cebrensis Schaus, 1914
- Ceromacra erebusalis Walker, 1858
- Ceromacra putida Dognin, 1912
- Ceromacra tymber Cramer, 1777
