= Focillodes =

Scientific classification
- Domain: Eukaryota
- Kingdom: Animalia
- Phylum: Arthropoda
- Class: Insecta
- Order: Lepidoptera
- Superfamily: Noctuoidea
- Family: Erebidae
- Subfamily: Calpinae
- Genus: Focillodes; Bethune-Baker, 1906

Synonyms
- Contortivena Bethune-Baker, 1906

Genus of moths

Focillodes is a genus of moths of the family Erebidae. The genus was erected by George Thomas Bethune-Baker in 1906.

== Species ==
- Focillodes dinawa Bethune-Baker, 1906
- Focillodes distorta Warren, 1903
- Focillodes fulva Bethune-Baker, 1906
- Focillodes medionigra Bethune-Baker, 1906
- Focillodes subapicata Warren, 1903
- Focillodes uncinata Pagenstecher, 1900
