= Chalenata =

Scientific classification
- Kingdom: Animalia
- Phylum: Arthropoda
- Class: Insecta
- Order: Lepidoptera
- Superfamily: Noctuoidea
- Family: Noctuidae
- Subfamily: Acontiinae
- Genus: Chalenata; Walker, 1864

Genus of moths

Chalenata is a genus of moths of the family Noctuidae. The genus was erected by Francis Walker in 1864.

== Species ==
- Chalenata bilinia (Schaus, 1904) Brazil (São Paulo)
- Chalenata fumosa (Butler, 1879) Brazil (Amazonas)
- Chalenata lilacina Hampson, 1910 Argentina (Gran Chaco)
- Chalenata mesonephele Hampson, 1910 Argentina
- Chalenata micaceella Walker, 1864 Brazil (Tefé)
- Chalenata noxia Schaus, 1911 Costa Rica
- Chalenata quella (Dyar, 1914) Panama
- Chalenata ustata Druce, 1909 Colombia
- Chalenata ustatina Dyar, 1914 Panama
