= Cryptastria =

Scientific classification
- Kingdom: Animalia
- Phylum: Arthropoda
- Class: Insecta
- Order: Lepidoptera
- Superfamily: Noctuoidea
- Family: Erebidae
- Subfamily: Calpinae
- Genus: Cryptastria; Hampson, 1926
- Species: C. fuscomarginata

Binomial name
- Cryptastria fuscomarginata Bethune-Baker, 1906

Genus of moths

Cryptastria is a monotypic moth genus of the family Erebidae erected by George Hampson in 1926. Its only species, Cryptastria fuscomarginata, was first described by George Thomas Bethune-Baker in 1906. It is found in New Guinea.
