= Clargia =

Scientific classification
- Domain: Eukaryota
- Kingdom: Animalia
- Phylum: Arthropoda
- Class: Insecta
- Order: Lepidoptera
- Superfamily: Noctuoidea
- Family: Erebidae
- Subfamily: Calpinae
- Genus: Clargia; Schaus, 1916
- Species: C. bonema

Binomial name
- Clargia bonema Schaus, 1916

Genus of moths

Clargia is a monotypic moth genus of the family Erebidae. Its only species, Clargia bonema, is found in French Guiana. Both the genus and the species were first described by William Schaus in 1916.
