= Corgathalia =

Scientific classification
- Kingdom: Animalia
- Phylum: Arthropoda
- Clade: Pancrustacea
- Class: Insecta
- Order: Lepidoptera
- Superfamily: Noctuoidea
- Family: Noctuidae
- Subfamily: Acontiinae
- Genus: Corgathalia; Berio, 1966

Genus of moths

Corgathalia is a genus of moths of the family Noctuidae. The genus was erected by Emilio Berio in 1966.

== Species ==
- Corgathalia hirutae Hacker, Fiebig & Stadie, 2019 Madagascar
- Corgathalia mazoatra (Viette, 1962) Madagascar
- Corgathalia minutiola Hacker, 2019 Zambia
- Corgathalia ochsei Hacker, 2019 Uganda
- Corgathalia viettei Berio, 1966 Madagascar
