= Camptylochila =

Scientific classification
- Domain: Eukaryota
- Kingdom: Animalia
- Phylum: Arthropoda
- Class: Insecta
- Order: Lepidoptera
- Superfamily: Noctuoidea
- Family: Erebidae
- Subfamily: Herminiinae
- Genus: Camptylochila; Stephens, 1834

Genus of moths

Camptylochila is a genus of moths of the family Noctuidae. Some authors consider it to be a synonym of Idia. If it is treated as a valid genus, it contains at least the type species Camptylochila undulalis Stephens, 1834.
