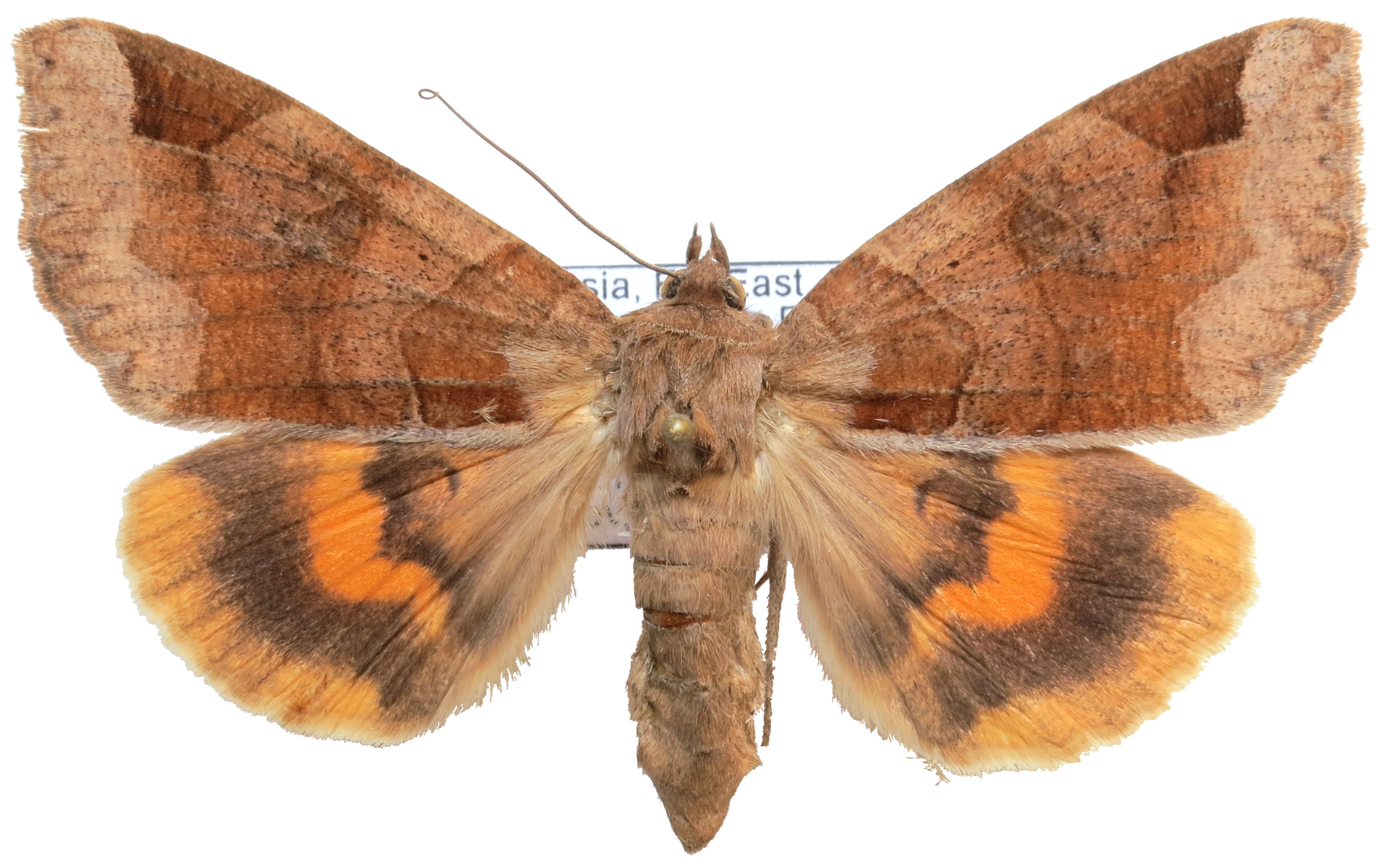
- Chrysorithrum amata - Lesser Khingan Mts, Russia

Scientific classification
- Domain: Eukaryota
- Kingdom: Animalia
- Phylum: Arthropoda
- Class: Insecta
- Order: Lepidoptera
- Superfamily: Noctuoidea
- Family: Erebidae
- Subfamily: Calpinae
- Genus: Chrysorithrum; Butler, 1878

= Chrysorithrum =

Genus of moths

Chrysorithrum is a genus of moths of the family Noctuidae.

== Species ==
- Chrysorithrum amata Bremer & Grey, 1853
- Chrysorithrum flavomaculata Bremer, 1861

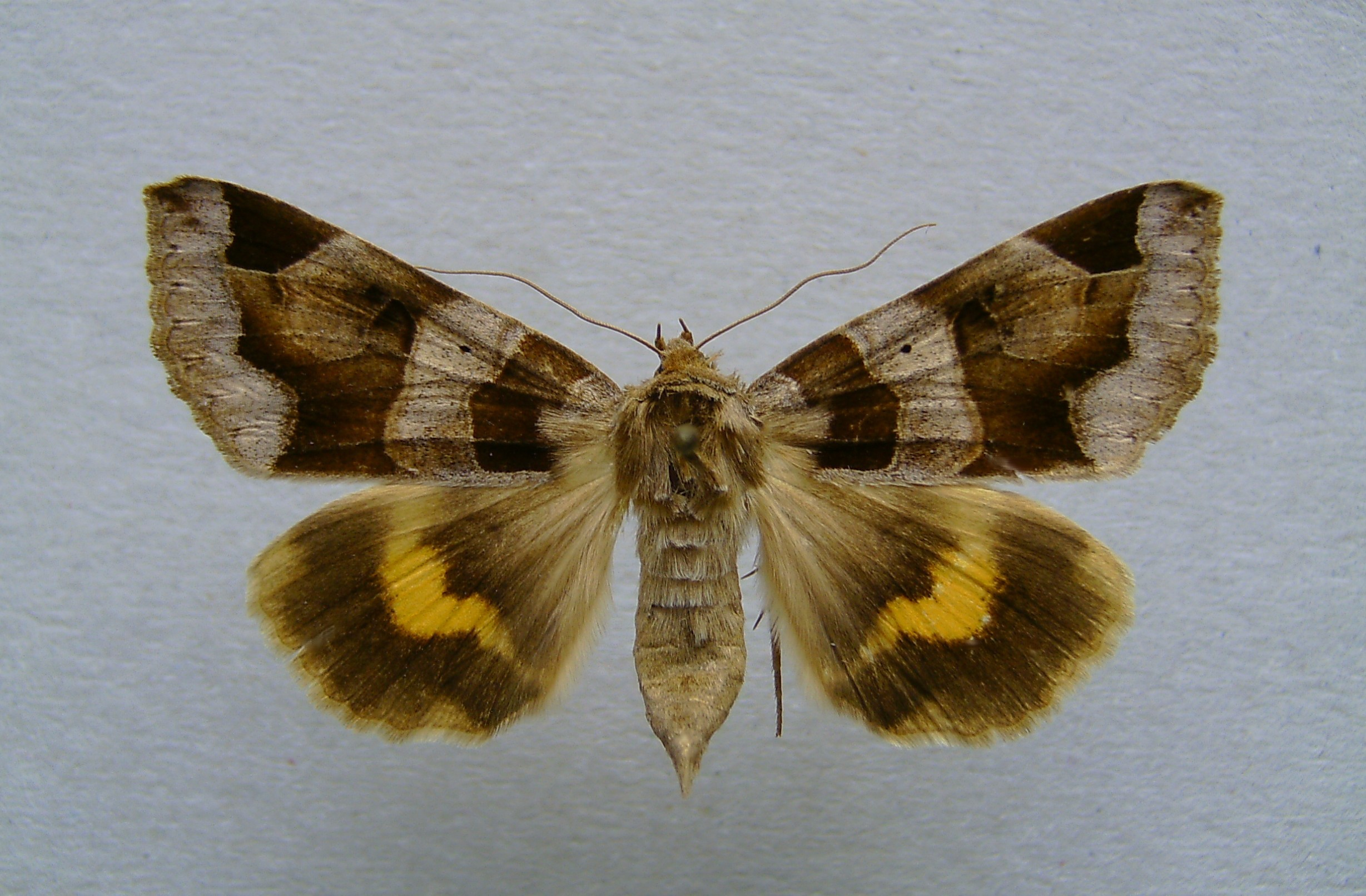
Chrysorithrum amata

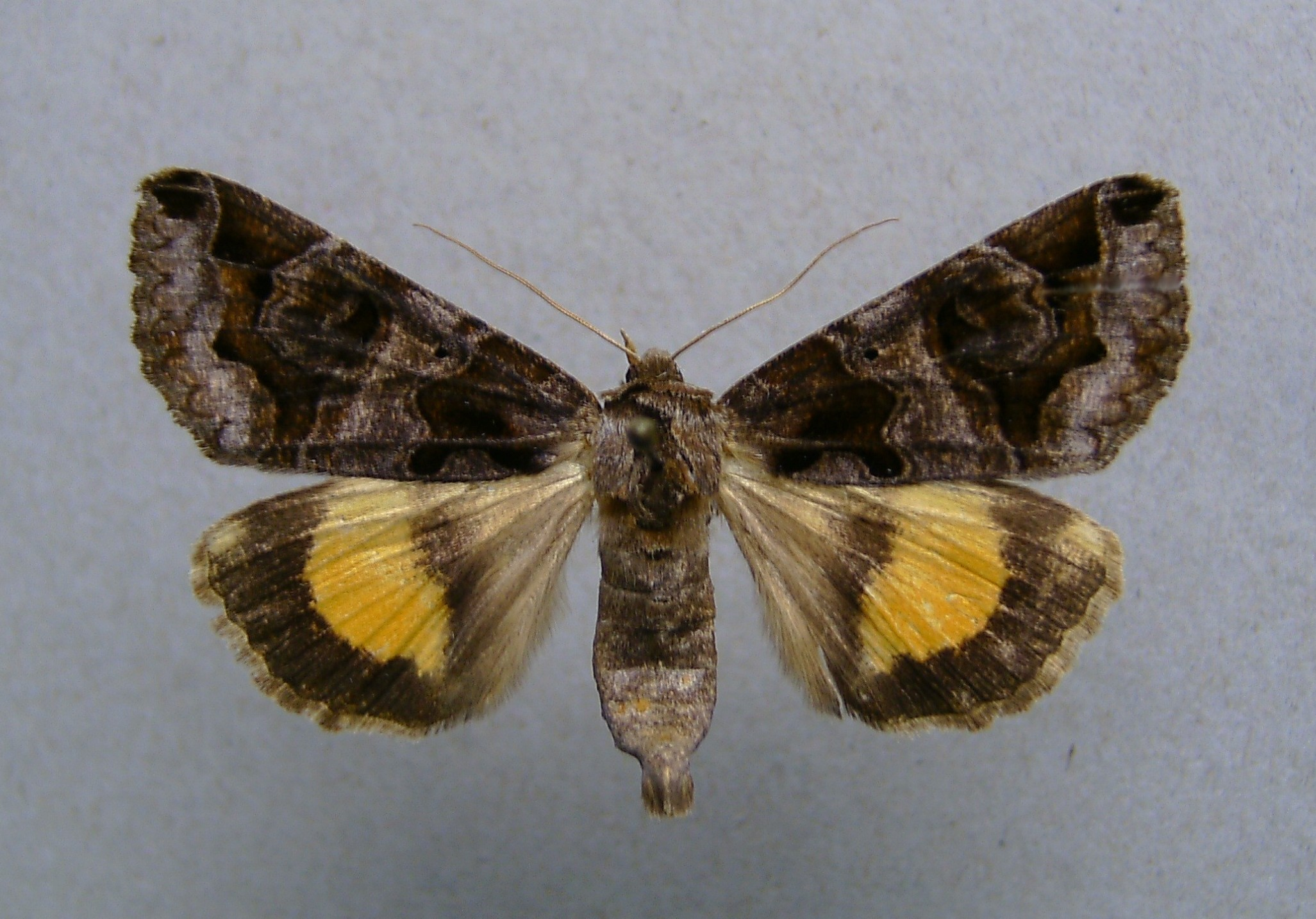
Chrysorithrum flavomaculata
