= Caroga costalis =

Scientific classification
- Kingdom: Animalia
- Phylum: Arthropoda
- Clade: Pancrustacea
- Class: Insecta
- Order: Lepidoptera
- Superfamily: Noctuoidea
- Family: Erebidae
- Genus: Caroga; Schaus, 1906
- Species: C. costalis

Binomial name
- Caroga costalis Schaus, 1906

Species of moth

Caroga costalis is the only species in the monotypic moth genus Caroga of the family Erebidae. It is found in Rio de Janeiro, Brazil. Both the genus and the species were first described by William Schaus in 1906.
