= Calloruza =

Scientific classification
- Kingdom: Animalia
- Phylum: Arthropoda
- Class: Insecta
- Order: Lepidoptera
- Superfamily: Noctuoidea
- Family: Noctuidae
- Subfamily: Acontiinae
- Genus: Calloruza; Hampson, 1918
- Species: C. pulchra

Binomial name
- Calloruza pulchra (Bethune-Baker, 1906)

Genus of moths

Calloruza is a monotypic moth genus of the family Noctuidae erected by George Hampson in 1918. Its only species, Calloruza pulchra, was first described by George Thomas Bethune-Baker in 1906. It is found in New Guinea.
