= Cyclopteryx =

Scientific classification
- Kingdom: Animalia
- Phylum: Arthropoda
- Class: Insecta
- Order: Lepidoptera
- Superfamily: Noctuoidea
- Family: Erebidae
- Subfamily: Calpinae
- Genus: Cyclopteryx; Guenée, 1854

Genus of moths

Cyclopteryx is a genus of moths of the family Erebidae. The genus was erected by Achille Guenée in 1854.

== Species ==
- Cyclopteryx laniata Hampson, 1924
- Cyclopteryx observalis Guenée, 1854
