= Catamelas =

Scientific classification
- Domain: Eukaryota
- Kingdom: Animalia
- Phylum: Arthropoda
- Class: Insecta
- Order: Lepidoptera
- Superfamily: Noctuoidea
- Family: Erebidae
- Subfamily: Calpinae
- Genus: Catamelas; Rogenhofer, 1874

species
- Catamelas caripina Felder, 1874

Genus of moths

Catamelas is a monotypic moth genus of the family Erebidae erected by Alois Friedrich Rogenhofer in 1874. Its only species, Catamelas caripina, was first described by Felder in 1874. It is found in Brazil.
