= Cautaeschra =

Scientific classification
- Kingdom: Animalia
- Phylum: Arthropoda
- Class: Insecta
- Order: Lepidoptera
- Superfamily: Noctuoidea
- Family: Noctuidae
- Subfamily: Acontiinae
- Genus: Cautaeschra; Hampson, 1910

Genus of moths

Cautaeschra is a genus of moths of the family Noctuidae. The genus was erected by George Hampson in 1910.

== Species ==
- Cautaeschra flavescens Rothschild, 1915 New Guinea
- Cautaeschra ustipennis (Hampson, 1894) Nagas
