= Cheillophota =

Scientific classification
- Domain: Eukaryota
- Kingdom: Animalia
- Phylum: Arthropoda
- Class: Insecta
- Order: Lepidoptera
- Superfamily: Noctuoidea
- Family: Erebidae
- Subfamily: Herminiinae
- Genus: Cheillophota; Bethune-Baker, 1908

Genus of moths

Cheillophota is a genus of moths of the family Erebidae. The genus was defined by George Thomas Bethune-Baker in 1908. All of the species are found in New Guinea.

== Species ==
- Cheillophota costistrigata Bethune-Baker, 1908
- Cheillophota dinawa (Bethune-Baker, 1908)
- Cheillophota nigra (Bethune-Baker, 1908)
- Cheillophota owgarra (Bethune-Baker, 1908)
