= Chionoxantha =

Scientific classification
- Kingdom: Animalia
- Phylum: Arthropoda
- Class: Insecta
- Order: Lepidoptera
- Superfamily: Noctuoidea
- Family: Noctuidae
- Subfamily: Acontiinae
- Genus: Chionoxantha; Hampson, 1914

Synonyms
- Xantholeuca Hampson, 1910

Genus of moths

Chionoxantha is a genus of moths of the family Erebidae. The genus was erected by George Hampson in 1914.

== Species ==
- Chionoxantha leucophaea Hampson, 1916
- Chionoxantha margarita Brandt, 1938
- Chionoxantha staudingeri Standfuss, 1892
- Chionoxantha trophotalis Hampson, 1908
