= Colnettia =

Scientific classification
- Kingdom: Animalia
- Phylum: Arthropoda
- Clade: Pancrustacea
- Class: Insecta
- Order: Lepidoptera
- Superfamily: Noctuoidea
- Family: Erebidae
- Subfamily: Calpinae
- Genus: Colnettia; Holloway, 1979
- Species: C. brinoni

Binomial name
- Colnettia brinoni Holloway, 1979

Genus of moths

Colnettia is a monotypic moth genus of the family Erebidae. Its only species, Colnettia brinoni, is found in New Caledonia in the south-west Pacific Ocean. Both the genus and the species were first described by Jeremy Daniel Holloway in 1979.
