= Calesiodes =

Scientific classification
- Domain: Eukaryota
- Kingdom: Animalia
- Phylum: Arthropoda
- Class: Insecta
- Order: Lepidoptera
- Superfamily: Noctuoidea
- Family: Erebidae
- Subfamily: Calpinae
- Genus: Calesiodes; Roepke, 1941
- Species: C. punctiger

Binomial name
- Calesiodes punctiger Roepke, 1941

Genus of moths

Calesiodes is a genus of moths of the family Erebidae. Its only species, Calesiodes punctiger, is found in Borneo. Both the genus and the species were first described by Roepke in 1941.
