= Cardiestra =

Scientific classification
- Domain: Eukaryota
- Kingdom: Animalia
- Phylum: Arthropoda
- Class: Insecta
- Order: Lepidoptera
- Superfamily: Noctuoidea
- Family: Noctuidae
- Genus: Cardiestra

Genus of moths

Cardiestra is a genus of moths of the family Noctuidae.

Species include:

   * Cardiestra eremistis (Püngeler 1904)
   * Cardiestra gobideserti (Varga 1973)
   * Cardiestra vaciva (Püngeler 1906)
   * Cardiestra vasilinini (Bang-Haas 1927)
