= Ceilodiastrophon =

Scientific classification
- Domain: Eukaryota
- Kingdom: Animalia
- Phylum: Arthropoda
- Class: Insecta
- Order: Lepidoptera
- Superfamily: Noctuoidea
- Family: Erebidae
- Subfamily: Herminiinae
- Genus: Ceilodiastrophon; Bethune-Baker, 1908

Genus of moths

Ceilodiastrophon is a genus of moths of the family Noctuidae. The genus was erected by George Thomas Bethune-Baker in 1908. Both species are known from New Guinea.

== Species ==
- Ceilodiastrophon albopunctata (Bethune-Baker, 1908)
- Ceilodiastrophon brunneum Bethune-Baker, 1908
