= Chlorocodia =

Scientific classification
- Kingdom: Animalia
- Phylum: Arthropoda
- Class: Insecta
- Order: Lepidoptera
- Superfamily: Noctuoidea
- Family: Noctuidae
- Subfamily: Acontiinae
- Genus: Chlorocodia; Hampson, 1910
- Species: C. olivescens

Binomial name
- Chlorocodia olivescens Hampson, 1910

Genus of moths

Chlorocodia is a monotypic moth genus of the family Noctuidae. Its only species, Chlorocodia olivescens, is found in the Brazilian state of Rio de Janeiro. Both the genus and species were first described by George Hampson in 1910.
