= Coeloturatia =

Scientific classification
- Domain: Eukaryota
- Kingdom: Animalia
- Phylum: Arthropoda
- Class: Insecta
- Order: Lepidoptera
- Superfamily: Noctuoidea
- Family: Noctuidae
- Subfamily: Acontiinae
- Genus: Coeloturatia; Strand, 1928
- Species: C. patanei

Binomial name
- Coeloturatia patanei (Turati, 1926)

Synonyms
- Generic: Coelites Turati, 1926; Specific: Coelites patanei Turati, 1926

Genus of moths

Coeloturatia is a monotypic moth genus of the family Noctuidae described by Strand in 1928. Its only species, Coeloturatia patanei, was first described by Turati in 1926. It is found in Libya.
