= Catephiodes =

Scientific classification
- Kingdom: Animalia
- Phylum: Arthropoda
- Clade: Pancrustacea
- Class: Insecta
- Order: Lepidoptera
- Superfamily: Noctuoidea
- Family: Noctuidae
- Genus: Catephiodes; Hampson, 1905

Genus of moths

Catephiodes is a genus of moths of the family Noctuidae.
