= Chalcoecia =

Scientific classification
- Kingdom: Animalia
- Phylum: Arthropoda
- Class: Insecta
- Order: Lepidoptera
- Superfamily: Noctuoidea
- Family: Noctuidae
- Subfamily: Acontiinae
- Tribe: Chamaecleini
- Genus: Chalcoecia; Hampson, 1908

Synonyms
- Cymonia Dyar, 1920

Genus of moths

Chalcoecia is a genus of moths of the family Noctuidae. The genus was erected by George Hampson in 1908.

== Species ==
- Chalcoecia emessa H. Druce, 1889
- Chalcoecia gloria Schaus, 1911
- Chalcoecia harminella Dyar, 1920
- Chalcoecia heochroa Dyar, 1914
- Chalcoecia patina Dognin, 1922
- Chalcoecia patricia Schaus, 1911
- Chalcoecia rhodoxantha Dognin, 1908
