= Crambiforma =

Scientific classification
- Kingdom: Animalia
- Phylum: Arthropoda
- Class: Insecta
- Order: Lepidoptera
- Superfamily: Noctuoidea
- Family: Erebidae
- Subfamily: Calpinae
- Genus: Crambiforma; Hampson, 1926

Genus of moths

Crambiforma is a genus of moths of the family Erebidae. The genus was erected by George Hampson in 1926.

== Species ==
- Crambiforma leucostrepta Hampson, 1926
- Crambiforma minutula Hacker, 2016
