= Coruncala =

Scientific classification
- Kingdom: Animalia
- Phylum: Arthropoda
- Class: Insecta
- Order: Lepidoptera
- Superfamily: Noctuoidea
- Family: Erebidae
- Subfamily: Calpinae
- Genus: Coruncala; Walker, 1865
- Species: C. latipennis

Binomial name
- Coruncala latipennis Walker, 1865

Genus of moths

Coruncala is a monotypic moth genus of the family Erebidae. Its only species, Coruncala latipennis, is found in Brazil. Both the genus and the species were first described by Francis Walker in 1865.
