= Cautatha =

Scientific classification
- Kingdom: Animalia
- Phylum: Arthropoda
- Clade: Pancrustacea
- Class: Insecta
- Order: Lepidoptera
- Superfamily: Noctuoidea
- Family: Noctuidae
- Genus: Cautatha; Hampson, 1910

Synonyms
- Enispades Bethune-Baker, 1911

Genus of moths

Cautatha is a genus of moths of the family Noctuidae. The genus was erected by George Hampson in 1910.

== Species ==
- Cautatha abyssinica Hacker, Fiebig & Stadie, 2019 Equatorial Guinea, Uganda, Ethiopia
- Cautatha bifasciata Hacker, Fiebig & Stadie, 2019 Ethiopia
- Cautatha coenogramma (Mabille, [1900]) Madagascar
- Cautatha congoensis Hacker, 2019 Zaire
- Cautatha crassilineata (Gaede, 1916) Cameroon
- Cautatha drepanodes (Hampson, 1910) Cameroon, Gabon, Uganda, Angola, Zimbabwe, Ethiopia, Kenya, Tanzania
- Cautatha drepanoidea Hacker, 2019 South Africa
- Cautatha fontainei Hacker, 2019 Zaire
- Cautatha macariodes (Hampson, 1910) Ghana, Cameroon, Central African Republic, Zaire, Gabon, Angola, Uganda, Tanzania
- Cautatha megista Hacker, 2019 Ethiopia, Kenya, Tanzania, Uganda
- Cautatha ozolica (Hampson, 1910) Ghana, Ivory Coast, Liberia, Kenya
- Cautatha phoenicea Hampson, 1910 Ghana, Liberia, Ethiopia, Kenya, Uganda
- Cautatha pyrrhochra Hacker, 2019 Zaire
- Cautatha submacariodes (Berio, 1959) Madagascar
- Cautatha tenuilineata (Gaede, 1916) Ivory Coast, Burkina Faso, Nigeria, Cameroon, Gabon, Kenya, Uganda, Rwanda, Tanzania
