= Casperia erebipennis =

Scientific classification
- Kingdom: Animalia
- Phylum: Arthropoda
- Clade: Pancrustacea
- Class: Insecta
- Order: Lepidoptera
- Superfamily: Noctuoidea
- Family: Erebidae
- Subfamily: Hypeninae
- Genus: Casperia; Walker, 1867
- Species: C. erebipennis

Binomial name
- Casperia erebipennis Walker, 1867

Species of moth

Casperia erebipennis is the only species in the monotypic moth genus Casperia of the family Erebidae. It is known from Colombia. Both the genus and the species were first described by Francis Walker in 1867.
