= Caphornia =

Scientific classification
- Kingdom: Animalia
- Phylum: Arthropoda
- Clade: Pancrustacea
- Class: Insecta
- Order: Lepidoptera
- Superfamily: Noctuoidea
- Family: Noctuidae
- Subfamily: Noctuinae
- Genus: Caphornia

Genus of moths

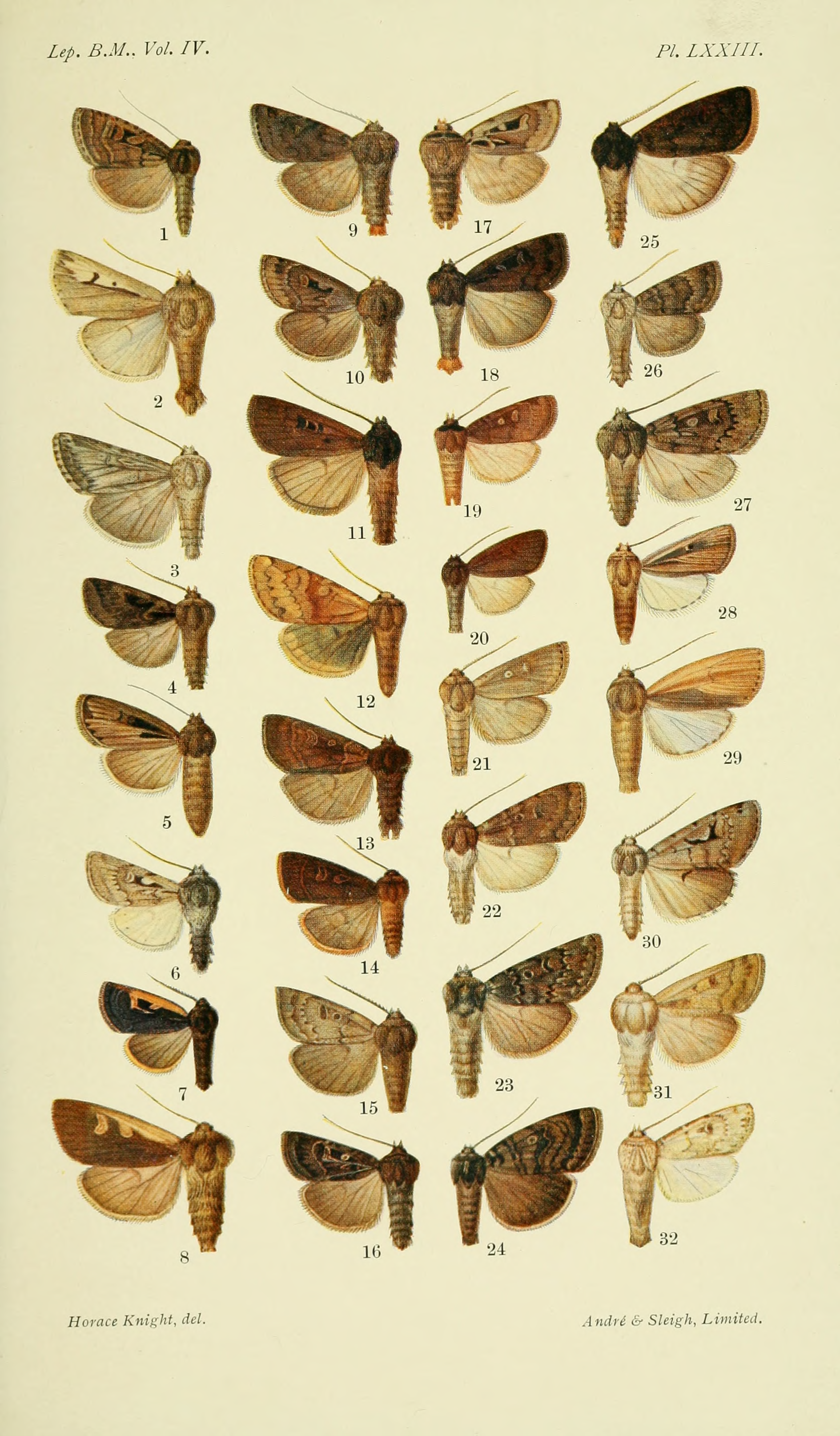
Euxoa marcida (Christ.) = Goniographa marcida (Christoph, 1893), ♂, Persia. [Euxoa] t-nigrum (Guen.) = Praina t-nigrum (Guenée, 1852), ♂, Brazil. [Euxoa] æquicuspis (Staud.) = Dichagyris multicuspis aequicuspis (Staudinger, 1900), ♂, Mongolia. Episilia panda (Leech) = Raddea t-nigrum (Leech, 1900), ♂, Western China. [Episilia] bistrigata (Mssn.) = Agrotis bistrigata Maassen, 1890, ♀, Ecuador. [Episilia] terrifica (Smith) = Protogygia elevata (J.B.Smith, 1891), ♂, Colorado. [Episilia] retracta (Hmpsn.) = Xestia retracta (Hampson, 1903), ♂, Sikkim ("Sikhim"). [Episilia] flavicosta (Wllgrn.) = Caphornia flavicosta (Wallengren, 1860), ♀, Patagonia. [Episilia] fishi [sic] (Grote) = Metalepsis fishii (Grote, 1878), ♀, Maine. [Episilia] cinerea (Staud.) = Xestia okakensis okakensis (Packard, 1867), ♂, Labrador. [Episilia] ceramophæa (Meyr.) = Agrotis ceramophaea Meyrick, 1899, ♂, Hawaii. [Episilia] loresi [sic] (Staud.) = Xestia lorezi lorezi (Staudinger, 1891), ♂, Tyrol ("Tirol"). [Episilia] destituta (Leech) = Xestia destituta (Leech, 1900), ♂, Western China. [Episilia] homochroma Hmpsn. = Xestia homochroma (Hampson, 1903), ♂, Tibet. [Episilia] cinerascens (Smith) = Xestia cinerascens (Smith, 1891), ♂, Washington. [Episilia] stridula (Staud.) [sic] = Chersotis stridula (Staudinger, 1896), ♂, Central Asia ("W. Turkestan"). [Episilia] voccei [sic] (Möschl.) = Xestia wockei (Möschler, 1862), ♂, New Hampshire. [Episilia] præcipua (Staud.) ?= Pseudohermonassa ononensis (Bremer, 1861), ♂, Eastern Siberia. [Episilia] modesta (Staud.) (non Moore, 1881: preoccupied) = Hermonassa staudingeri Koçak, 1981, ♂, Tibet. [Episilia] isochroma Hmpsn. = Xestia isochroma (Hampson 1903), ♂, Tibet. [Episilia] argillacea (Alph.) = Perissandria argillacea (Alpheraky, 1892), ♂, Tibet. [Episilia] violetta (Staud.) = Parexarnis violetta (Staudinger, 1888), ♂, Central Asia ("W. Turkestan"). [Episilia] alaina (Staud.) = Rhyacia junonia alaina (Staudinger, 1888), ♂, Central Asia ("W. Turkestan"). [Episilia] ignobilis (Staud.) = Rhyacia ignobilis (Staudinger, 1888), ♂, Central Asia ("W. Turkestan"). [Episilia] subplumbea (Staud.) = Feltia subplumbea (Staudinger, 1895), ♂, Tibet. [Episilia] diplogramma Hmpsn. = Rhyacia diplogramma (Hampson 1903), ♂, Central Asia ("W. Turkestan"). [Episilia] monogramma Hmpsn. = Protexarnis monogramma (Hampson, 1903), ♂, Kashmir. [Episilia] tiniloides (Dognin) = Tandilia tiniloides Dognin 1897, ♀, Ecuador. [Episilia] amina (Dognin) ?= Leucania amina Dognin, 1897, ♀, Ecuador. Lycophotia perigrapha (Püng.) = Xestia perigrapha (Püngeler, 1899), ♂, Tibet. [Lycophotia] lutescens (Ev.) = Yigoga lutescens (Eversmann, 1844), ♂, Urals. [Lycophotia] achromatica Hmpsn. = Agrotis achromatica (Hampson, 1903), ♂, Brazil.

Caphornia is a genus of moths of the family Noctuidae.
