= Callostrotia =

Scientific classification
- Kingdom: Animalia
- Phylum: Arthropoda
- Class: Insecta
- Order: Lepidoptera
- Superfamily: Noctuoidea
- Family: Noctuidae
- Subfamily: Acontiinae
- Genus: Callostrotia; Hampson, 1914
- Species: C. flavizonata

Binomial name
- Callostrotia flavizonata Hampson, 1914

Genus of moths

Callostrotia is a monotypic moth genus of the family Noctuidae. Its only species, Callostrotia flavizonata, is found in Nigeria. Both the genus and species were first described by George Hampson in 1914.
