= Corynitis =

Scientific classification
- Domain: Eukaryota
- Kingdom: Animalia
- Phylum: Arthropoda
- Class: Insecta
- Order: Lepidoptera
- Superfamily: Noctuoidea
- Family: Erebidae
- Subfamily: Herminiinae
- Genus: Corynitis; Geyer, 1832
- Species: C. penicillalis

Binomial name
- Corynitis penicillalis Geyer, 1832

Genus of moths

Corynitis is a monotypic moth genus of the family Erebidae. Its only species, Corynitis penicillalis, is found in Rio de Janeiro, Brazil. Both the genus and the species were first described by Carl Geyer in 1832.
