= Charoblemma =

Scientific classification
- Kingdom: Animalia
- Phylum: Arthropoda
- Clade: Pancrustacea
- Class: Insecta
- Order: Lepidoptera
- Superfamily: Noctuoidea
- Family: Noctuidae
- Subfamily: Acontiinae
- Genus: Charoblemma; Dyar, 1914

Genus of moths

Charoblemma is a genus of moths in the family Noctuidae. The genus was erected by Harrison Gray Dyar Jr. in 1914.

== Species ==
- Charoblemma discipuncta Hampson, 1910
- Charoblemma opisthomela Dyar, 1914 Panama
- Charoblemma unilinea Dyar, 1914 Panama
