= Crambophilia =

Scientific classification
- Kingdom: Animalia
- Phylum: Arthropoda
- Class: Insecta
- Order: Lepidoptera
- Superfamily: Noctuoidea
- Family: Erebidae
- Subfamily: Herminiinae
- Genus: Crambophilia; Dyar, 1914

Genus of moths

Crambophilia is a genus of moths of the family Erebidae. The genus was erected by Harrison Gray Dyar Jr. in 1914. Both species are found in Panama.

== Species ==
- Crambophilia majorcula Dyar, 1914
- Crambophilia minorcula Dyar, 1914
