= Canatha (moth) =

Scientific classification
- Kingdom: Animalia
- Phylum: Arthropoda
- Clade: Pancrustacea
- Class: Insecta
- Order: Lepidoptera
- Superfamily: Noctuoidea
- Family: Erebidae
- Subfamily: Calpinae
- Genus: Canatha; Walker, 1866

Genus of moths

Canatha is a genus of moths of the family Erebidae. In his original descriptions, Francis Walker listed the locality of C. confutalis specimen as Ega (now Tefé, Brazil) and that of C. subangulalis as Honduras.

== Species ==
- Canatha confutalis Walker, 1866
- Canatha subangulalis Walker, 1866
