= Cristatopalpus =

Scientific classification
- Domain: Eukaryota
- Kingdom: Animalia
- Phylum: Arthropoda
- Class: Insecta
- Order: Lepidoptera
- Superfamily: Noctuoidea
- Family: Erebidae
- Subfamily: Herminiinae
- Genus: Cristatopalpus; Bethune-Baker, 1908
- Species: C. olivens

Binomial name
- Cristatopalpus olivens Bethune-Baker, 1908

Genus of moths

Cristatopalpus is a monotypic moth genus of the family Erebidae. Its only species, Cristatopalpus olivens, is found in New Guinea. Both the genus and the species were first described by George Thomas Bethune-Baker in 1908.

The Global Lepidoptera Names Index gives this name as a synonym of Crenotermes Hampson.
