= Clytoscopa =

Scientific classification
- Domain: Eukaryota
- Kingdom: Animalia
- Phylum: Arthropoda
- Class: Insecta
- Order: Lepidoptera
- Superfamily: Noctuoidea
- Family: Noctuidae
- Subfamily: Acontiinae
- Genus: Clytoscopa; Turner, 1931

Genus of moths

Clytoscopa is a genus of moths of the family Noctuidae.

== Species ==
- Clytoscopa iorrhoda Turner, 1931
- Clytoscopa serena Turner, 1931
