= Carillade =

Scientific classification
- Domain: Eukaryota
- Kingdom: Animalia
- Phylum: Arthropoda
- Class: Insecta
- Order: Lepidoptera
- Superfamily: Noctuoidea
- Family: Erebidae
- Subfamily: Calpinae
- Genus: Carillade; Schaus, 1913
- Species: C. harmonia

Binomial name
- Carillade harmonia Schaus, 1913

Genus of moths

Carillade is a monotypic moth genus of the family Erebidae. Its only species, Carillade harmonia, is found in Costa Rica. Both the genus and the species were first described by William Schaus in 1913.
