= Clapra =

Scientific classification
- Domain: Eukaryota
- Kingdom: Animalia
- Phylum: Arthropoda
- Class: Insecta
- Order: Lepidoptera
- Superfamily: Noctuoidea
- Family: Erebidae
- Subfamily: Calpinae
- Genus: Clapra; Möschler, 1880

Genus of moths

Clapra is a genus of moths of the family Erebidae. The genus was erected by Heinrich Benno Möschler in 1880.

== Species ==
- Clapra asthenoides Möschler, 1880
- Clapra atalanta Schaus, 1912
- Clapra deucalion Schaus, 1914
- Clapra ero Möschler, 1880
- Clapra marginata Warren, 1889
- Clapra oculata Schaus, 1914
- Clapra punctulosa Walker, 1865
- Clapra uzza Schaus, 1911
