= Carpholithia =

Scientific classification
- Kingdom: Animalia
- Phylum: Arthropoda
- Class: Insecta
- Order: Lepidoptera
- Superfamily: Noctuoidea
- Family: Erebidae
- Subfamily: Calpinae
- Genus: Carpholithia; Butler, 1882
- Species: C. cinerea

Binomial name
- Carpholithia cinerea Butler, 1882

Genus of moths

Carpholithia is a monotypic moth genus of the family Erebidae. Its only species, Carpholithia cinerea, is found in Chile. Both the genus and the species were first described by Arthur Gardiner Butler in 1882.
