= Catephiona =

Scientific classification
- Kingdom: Animalia
- Phylum: Arthropoda
- Class: Insecta
- Order: Lepidoptera
- Superfamily: Noctuoidea
- Family: Erebidae
- Subfamily: Calpinae
- Genus: Catephiona; Hampson, 1926
- Species: C. lichenea

Binomial name
- Catephiona lichenea Hampson, 1895

Synonyms
- Catephia lichenea Hampson, 1895

Genus of moths

Catephiona is a monotypic moth genus of the family Erebidae. Its only species, Catephiona lichenea, is found in Bhutan. Both the genus and the species were first described by George Hampson, the genus in 1926 and the species over 30 years earlier in 1895.
