= Chaograptis =

Scientific classification
- Kingdom: Animalia
- Phylum: Arthropoda
- Class: Insecta
- Order: Lepidoptera
- Superfamily: Noctuoidea
- Family: Noctuidae
- Subfamily: Acontiinae
- Genus: Chaograptis; Meyrick, 1902

Genus of moths

Chaograptis is a genus of moths of the family Noctuidae.

== Species ==
- Chaograptis crystallodes Meyrick, 1902
- Chaograptis euchrysa Lower, 1903
- Chaograptis rhaptina Turner, 1904
