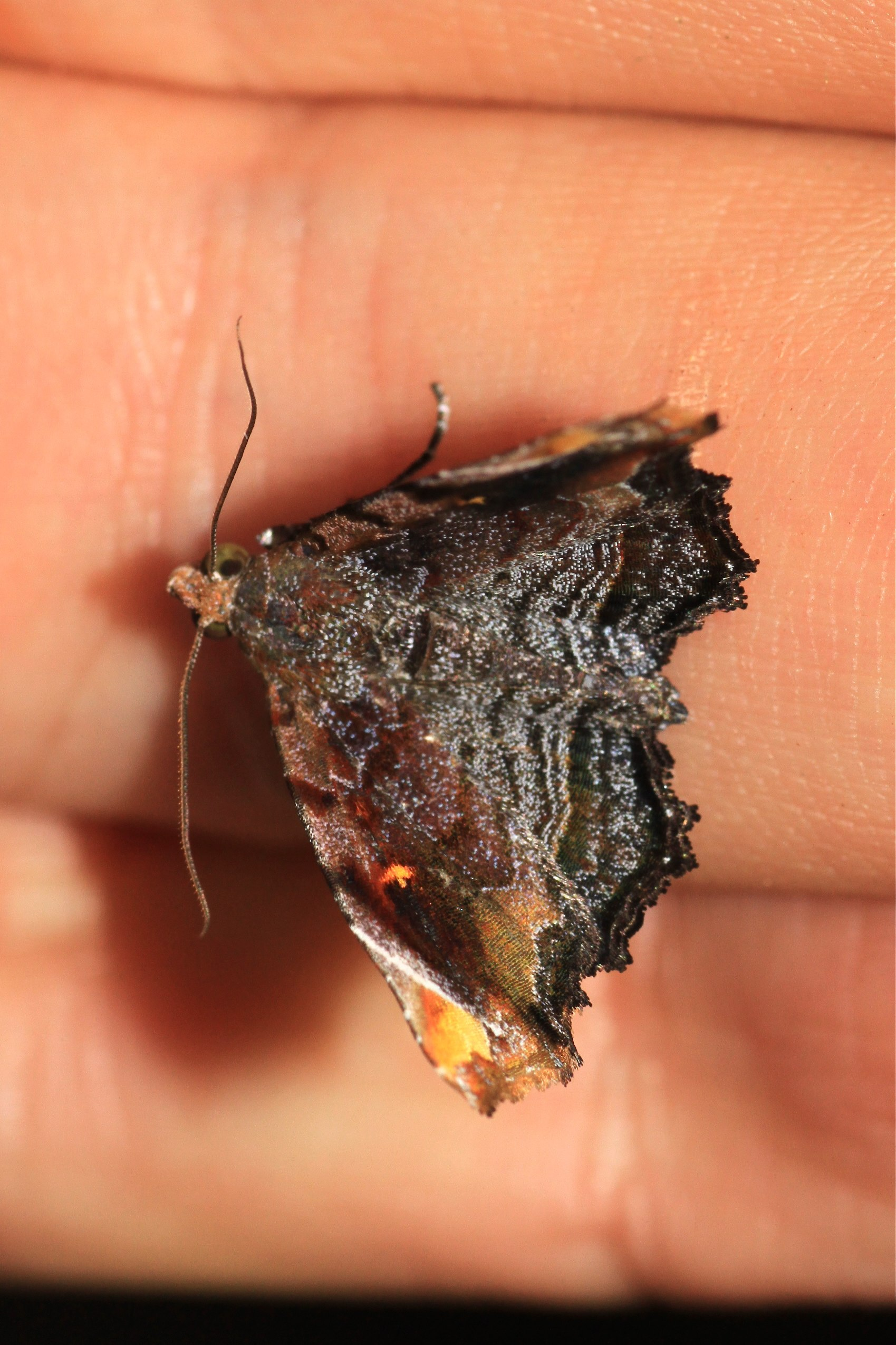

Scientific classification
- Kingdom: Animalia
- Phylum: Arthropoda
- Class: Insecta
- Order: Lepidoptera
- Superfamily: Noctuoidea
- Family: Erebidae
- Subfamily: Calpinae
- Genus: Chrysograpta; Hampson, 1926
- Species: C. igneola

Binomial name
- Chrysograpta igneola (C. Swinhoe, 1890)

Synonyms
- Egnasia igneola C. Swinhoe, 1890

= Chrysograpta =

Genus of moths

Chrysograpta is a monotypic moth genus of the family Erebidae erected by George Hampson in 1926. Its only species, Chrysograpta igneola, was first described by Charles Swinhoe in 1890. It is found in Myanmar.
