= Conochuza =

Scientific classification
- Domain: Eukaryota
- Kingdom: Animalia
- Phylum: Arthropoda
- Class: Insecta
- Order: Lepidoptera
- Superfamily: Noctuoidea
- Family: Noctuidae
- Subfamily: Amphipyrinae
- Genus: Conochuza; Berio, 1962
- Species: C. lineola

Binomial name
- Conochuza lineola Berio, 1962

Genus of moths

Conochuza is a monotypic moth genus of the family Noctuidae. Its only species, Conochuza lineola, is known from the Seychelles (Aldabra island). Both the genus and species were first described by Emilio Berio in 1962.
