= Codalithia =

Scientific classification
- Kingdom: Animalia
- Phylum: Arthropoda
- Clade: Pancrustacea
- Class: Insecta
- Order: Lepidoptera
- Superfamily: Noctuoidea
- Family: Noctuidae
- Subfamily: Acontiinae
- Genus: Codalithia; Holloway, 1979

Genus of moths

Codalithia is a genus of moths of the family Noctuidae. The genus was erected by Jeremy Daniel Holloway in 1979.

== Species ==
- Codalithia quincuncialis Holloway, 1979 New Caledonia
- Codalithia subtilis Holloway, 1979 New Caledonia
