= Catalana (moth) =

Scientific classification
- Kingdom: Animalia
- Phylum: Arthropoda
- Class: Insecta
- Order: Lepidoptera
- Superfamily: Noctuoidea
- Family: Erebidae
- Subfamily: Calpinae
- Genus: Catalana; Viette, 1954

Type species
- Catalana vohilava Viette, 1954

Genus of moths

Catalana is a genus of moths of the family Noctuidae. The genus was erected by Pierre Viette in 1954.

== Species ==
- Catalana sandrangato Viette, 1961
- Catalana vohilava Viette, 1954
