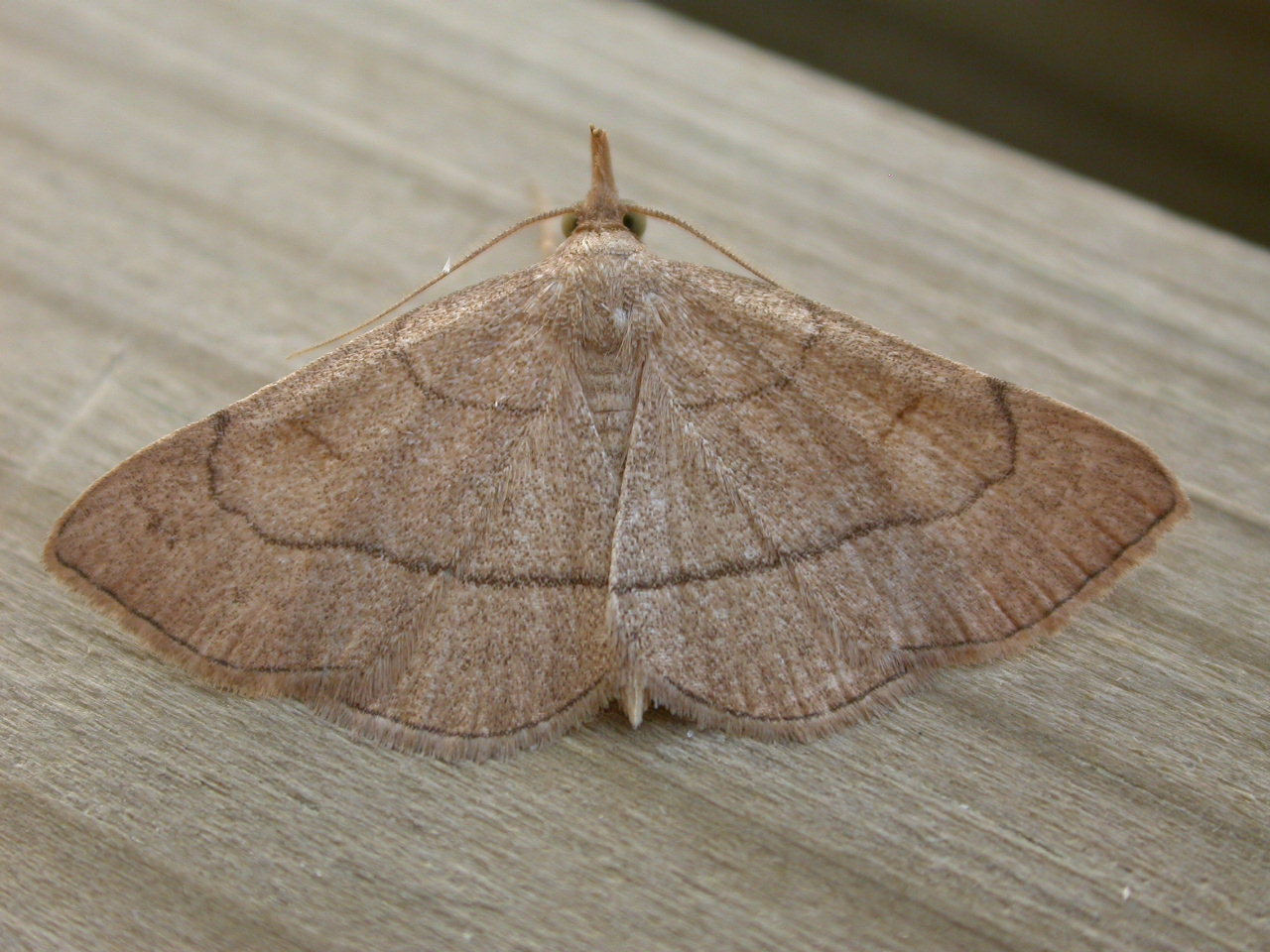
- Paracolax tristalis

Scientific classification
- Kingdom: Animalia
- Phylum: Arthropoda
- Clade: Pancrustacea
- Class: Insecta
- Order: Lepidoptera
- Superfamily: Noctuoidea
- Family: Erebidae
- Subfamily: Herminiinae
- Genus: Paracolax; Hübner, [1825]

Synonyms
- Capnistis Warren, 1913; Paraherminia Richards, 1932; Crinisinus Bryk, 1949

= Paracolax =

Genus of moths

Paracolax is a genus of litter moths of the family Erebidae. The genus was erected by Jacob Hübner in 1825.

== Species ==
- Paracolax albinotata (Butler, 1879) Japan
- Paracolax albopunctata Rothschild, 1915 New Guinea
- Paracolax angulata (Wileman, 1915) Japan, Taiwan
- Paracolax bipuncta Owada, 1982 Japan
- Paracolax brunnescens Rothschild, 1920 Sumatra
- Paracolax castanea Rothschild, 1920 Sumatra
- Paracolax contigua (Leech, 1900) Japan, Taiwan, China
- Paracolax fascialis (Leech, 1889) Japan, Korea, Amur, Ussuri
- Paracolax fentoni (Butler, 1879) Japan, Taiwan, Korea, China, Ussuri
- Paracolax griseata Rothschild, 1915 New Guinea
- Paracolax grisescens Holloway, 2008 Borneo
- Paracolax japonica Owada, 1987 Japan (Honshu)
- Paracolax montanus Holloway, 2008 Borneo
- Paracolax ocellatus Holloway, 2008 Borneo
- Paracolax ochrescens Holloway, 2008 Borneo
- Paracolax pacifica Inoue, Sugi, Kuroko, Moriuti & Kawabe, 1982 Japan
- Paracolax pectinatus Holloway, 2008 Borneo, Peninsular Malaysia
- Paracolax pryeri (Butler, 1879) Japan, Taiwan
- Paracolax tokui Inoue, Sugi, Kuroko, Moriuti & Kawabe, 1982 Japan
- Paracolax trilinealis (Bremer, 1864) Japan, Sakhalin, Korea, southeastern Siberia, China
- Paracolax tristalis (Fabricius, 1794) southern and central Europe, Japan, Sakhalin, China, Amur, Ussuri, Siberia - clay fan-foot
