= Cladocerotis =

Scientific classification
- Kingdom: Animalia
- Phylum: Arthropoda
- Class: Insecta
- Order: Lepidoptera
- Superfamily: Noctuoidea
- Family: Noctuidae
- Subfamily: Noctuinae
- Genus: Cladocerotis; Hampson, 1903

Genus of moths

Cladocerotis is a genus of moths of the family Noctuidae.

== Species ==
- Cladocerotis optabilis (Boisduval, [1837])
