= Codonodes =

Scientific classification
- Kingdom: Animalia
- Phylum: Arthropoda
- Class: Insecta
- Order: Lepidoptera
- Superfamily: Noctuoidea
- Family: Erebidae
- Subfamily: Calpinae
- Genus: Codonodes; Hampson, 1907

Genus of moths

Codonodes is a genus of moths of the family Erebidae. The genus was erected by George Hampson in 1907.

== Species ==
- Codonodes louisiada Hampson, 1926
- Codonodes rectigramma Hampson, 1907
