= Complutia =

Scientific classification
- Kingdom: Animalia
- Phylum: Arthropoda
- Class: Insecta
- Order: Lepidoptera
- Superfamily: Noctuoidea
- Family: Erebidae
- Subfamily: Calpinae
- Genus: Complutia; Walker, 1869
- Species: C. transversa

Binomial name
- Complutia transversa Walker, 1869

Genus of moths

Complutia is a monotypic moth genus of the family Erebidae. Its only species, Complutia transversa, is found in Honduras. Both the genus and the species were first described by Francis Walker in 1869.
