= Cryphiomima =

Scientific classification
- Domain: Eukaryota
- Kingdom: Animalia
- Phylum: Arthropoda
- Class: Insecta
- Order: Lepidoptera
- Superfamily: Noctuoidea
- Family: Noctuidae
- Genus: Cryphiomima; Berio, 1977

Genus of moths

Cryphiomima is a genus of moths of the family Noctuidae.

== Species ==
- Cryphiomima obliqua Berio, 1976/77
