= Euxoa bochus =

Scientific classification
- Domain: Eukaryota
- Kingdom: Animalia
- Phylum: Arthropoda
- Class: Insecta
- Order: Lepidoptera
- Superfamily: Noctuoidea
- Family: Noctuidae
- Genus: Euxoa
- Species: E. bochus

Binomial name
- Euxoa bochus (Morrison, 1874)

Synonyms
- Agrotis bochus Morrison, 1874; Euxoa brocha (misspelling); Euxoa (Crassivesica) bochus (Morrison, 1874); Crassivesica bocha (Morrison, 1874); Crassivesica bochus (Morrison, 1874)

Species of moth

Euxoa bochus is a moth of the family Noctuidae. It was described by Herbert Knowles Morrison in 1874. It is found in western North America, from Vancouver Island, south to southern Utah and northern New Mexico, east to central Colorado, Wyoming and the Cypress Hills area of south-western Saskatchewan. It is also present in Manitoba and British Columbia.

The wingspan is 34–36 mm. Adults are on wing from mid-July to mid-October. There is one generation per year.
