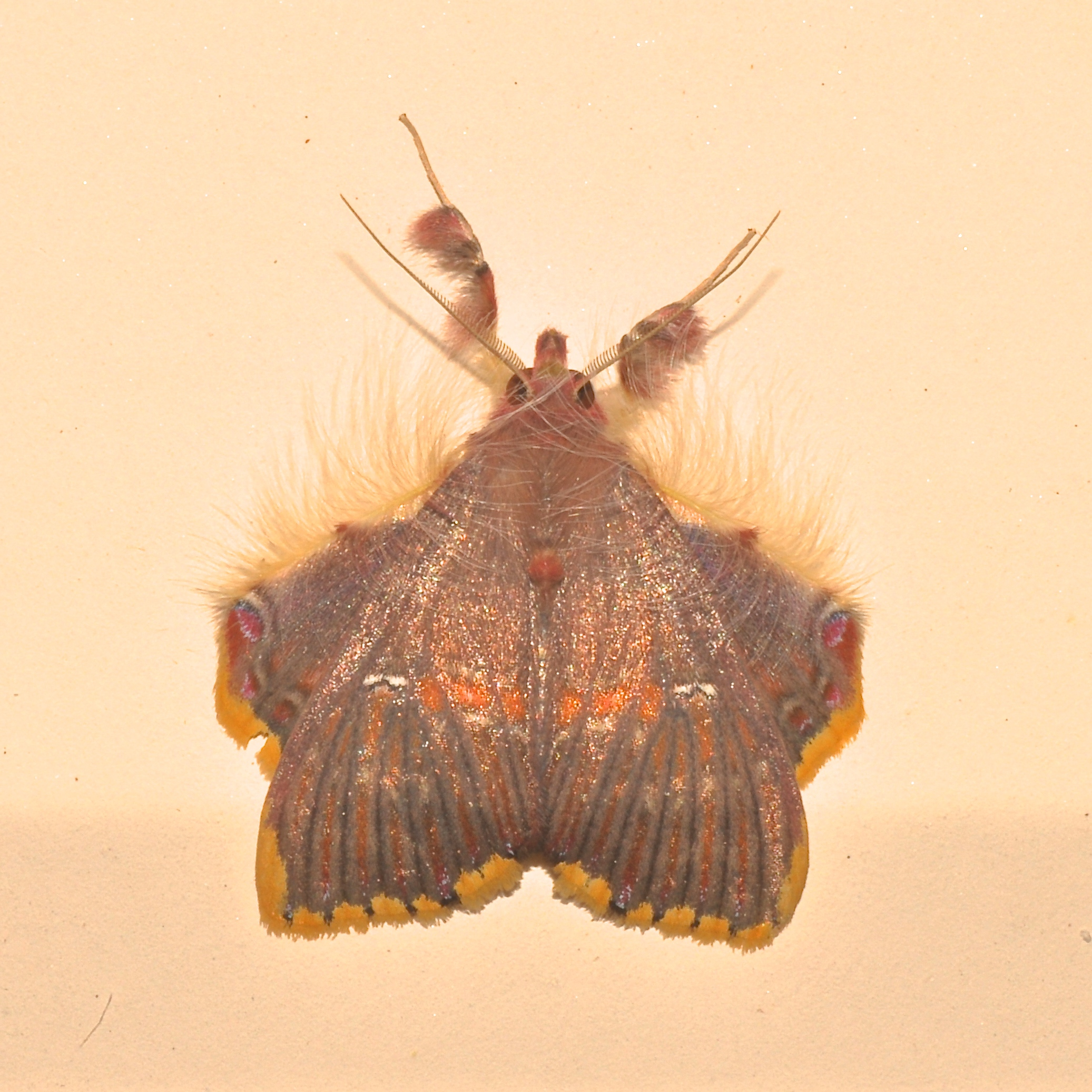

Scientific classification
- Kingdom: Animalia
- Phylum: Arthropoda
- Class: Insecta
- Order: Lepidoptera
- Superfamily: Noctuoidea
- Family: Erebidae
- Subfamily: Calpinae
- Genus: Sosxetra; Walker, 1862
- Species: S. grata

Binomial name
- Sosxetra grata Walker, 1862

Synonyms
- Generic: Chaetoloma Felder, [1874]; Specific: Sosxetra actinobola Felder, 1875; Sosxetra agatha Möschler, 1880

= Sosxetra =

Genus of moths

Sosxetra is a monotypic moth genus of the family Noctuidae. Its only species, Sosxetra grata, is found in Latin America. Both the genus and the species were described by Francis Walker in 1862.
