= Cataloxia =

Scientific classification
- Kingdom: Animalia
- Phylum: Arthropoda
- Class: Insecta
- Order: Lepidoptera
- Superfamily: Noctuoidea
- Family: Erebidae
- Subfamily: Calpinae
- Genus: Cataloxia; Hampson, 1926
- Species: C. diagrapta

Binomial name
- Cataloxia diagrapta Hampson, 1926

Genus of moths

Cataloxia is a monotypic moth genus of the family Erebidae. Its only species, Cataloxia diagrapta, is found in Borneo. Both the genus and the species were first described by George Hampson in 1926.
