= Syngatha =

Scientific classification
- Domain: Eukaryota
- Kingdom: Animalia
- Phylum: Arthropoda
- Class: Insecta
- Order: Lepidoptera
- Superfamily: Noctuoidea
- Family: Noctuidae
- Subfamily: Acontiinae
- Genus: Syngatha; Bethune-Baker, 1913

Synonyms
- Chrysozonata Hampson, 1914; Lophocyttarra Hampson, 1914

Genus of moths

Syngatha is a genus of moths of the family Noctuidae. The genus was erected by George Thomas Bethune-Baker in 1913.

== Species ==
- Syngatha argyropasta (Hampson, 1918) Malawi, Tanzania, South Africa
- Syngatha colossa Hacker, 2019 Nigeria
- Syngatha eremita Hacker, Fiebig & Stadie, 2019 Ethiopia
- Syngatha eremochroa Hacker, Fiebig & Stadie, 2019 Uganda
- Syngatha flavipars (Hampson, 1916) Somalia, Ethiopia, Zaire, Uganda
- Syngatha flaviscripta Hacker, Fiebig & Stadie, 2019 Uganda, Nigeria
- Syngatha flavitincta (Hampson, 1914) Ghana, Liberia, Kenya
- Syngatha geometriana (Viette, 1981) Madagascar
- Syngatha hannarolandae Hacker, 2019 Uganda
- Syngatha latiflavaria (Swinhoe, 1904) Malawi, Angola, Zimbabwe
- Syngatha parascotoides Hacker, 2019 Ethiopia
- Syngatha phoenichrysa Hacker, Fiebig & Staide, 2019 Uganda
- Syngatha phoenicoxantha (Hampson, 1914) South Africa
- Syngatha pyrrhoxantha Hacker, Fiebig & Hacker, 2019 South Africa
- Syngatha semipurpurea Hampson, 1918 Mozambique
- Syngatha semipurpurula Hacker, 2019 Ghana, Burkina Faso, Ethiopia
- Syngatha simplicicata Hacker, Fiebig & Stadie, 2019 Ethiopia
- Syngatha subflavipars Hacker, 2019 South Africa
