= Catadella =

Scientific classification
- Domain: Eukaryota
- Kingdom: Animalia
- Phylum: Arthropoda
- Class: Insecta
- Order: Lepidoptera
- Superfamily: Noctuoidea
- Family: Erebidae
- Subfamily: Hypeninae
- Genus: Catadella; Strand, 1919
- Species: C. pyralistis

Binomial name
- Catadella pyralistis (Strand, 1919)

Synonyms
- Catada pyralistis Strand, 1919

Genus of moths

Catadella is a monotypic moth genus of the family Erebidae. Its only species, Catadella pyralistis, is found in Taiwan. Both the genus and the species were first described by Strand in 1919.

Some sources give this name as a synonym of Catada Walker, [1859].
