= Callicereon =

Scientific classification
- Domain: Eukaryota
- Kingdom: Animalia
- Phylum: Arthropoda
- Class: Insecta
- Order: Lepidoptera
- Superfamily: Noctuoidea
- Family: Noctuidae
- Subfamily: Amphipyrinae
- Genus: Callicereon; Butler, 1882
- Species: C. heterochroa

Binomial name
- Callicereon heterochroa (Mabille, 1879)

Synonyms
- Deiopeja [sic] heterochroa Mabille, 1879; Callicereon affine Butler, 1882

Genus of moths

Callicereon is a monotypic moth genus of the family Noctuidae erected by Arthur Gardiner Butler in 1882. Its only species, Callicereon heterochroa, was first described by Paul Mabille in 1879. It is found on Madagascar.
