= Cryptochrysa =

Scientific classification
- Kingdom: Animalia
- Phylum: Arthropoda
- Class: Insecta
- Order: Lepidoptera
- Superfamily: Noctuoidea
- Family: Erebidae
- Subfamily: Calpinae
- Genus: Cryptochrysa; Hampson, 1926
- Species: C. auripennis

Binomial name
- Cryptochrysa auripennis Schaus, 1912

Genus of moths

Cryptochrysa is a monotypic moth genus of the family Erebidae erected by George Hampson in 1926. Its only species, Cryptochrysa auripennis, was first described by William Schaus in 1912. It is found in Costa Rica.
