= Cadiorapa =

Scientific classification
- Domain: Eukaryota
- Kingdom: Animalia
- Phylum: Arthropoda
- Class: Insecta
- Order: Lepidoptera
- Superfamily: Noctuoidea
- Family: Noctuidae
- Subfamily: Acontiinae
- Genus: Cadiorapa; Nye, 1975

Synonyms
- Paracodia Hampson, 1910

Genus of moths

Cadiorapa is a genus of moths of the family Noctuidae. The genus was described by Nye in 1975.

== Species ==
- Cadiorapa albivena (Hampson, 1910) Chile
- Cadiorapa globifrons (Dyar, 1920) Mexico
- Cadiorapa praxina (Schaus, 1905) Brazil (Paraná)
- Cadiorapa puella (Schaus, 1904) Brazil (São Paulo)
