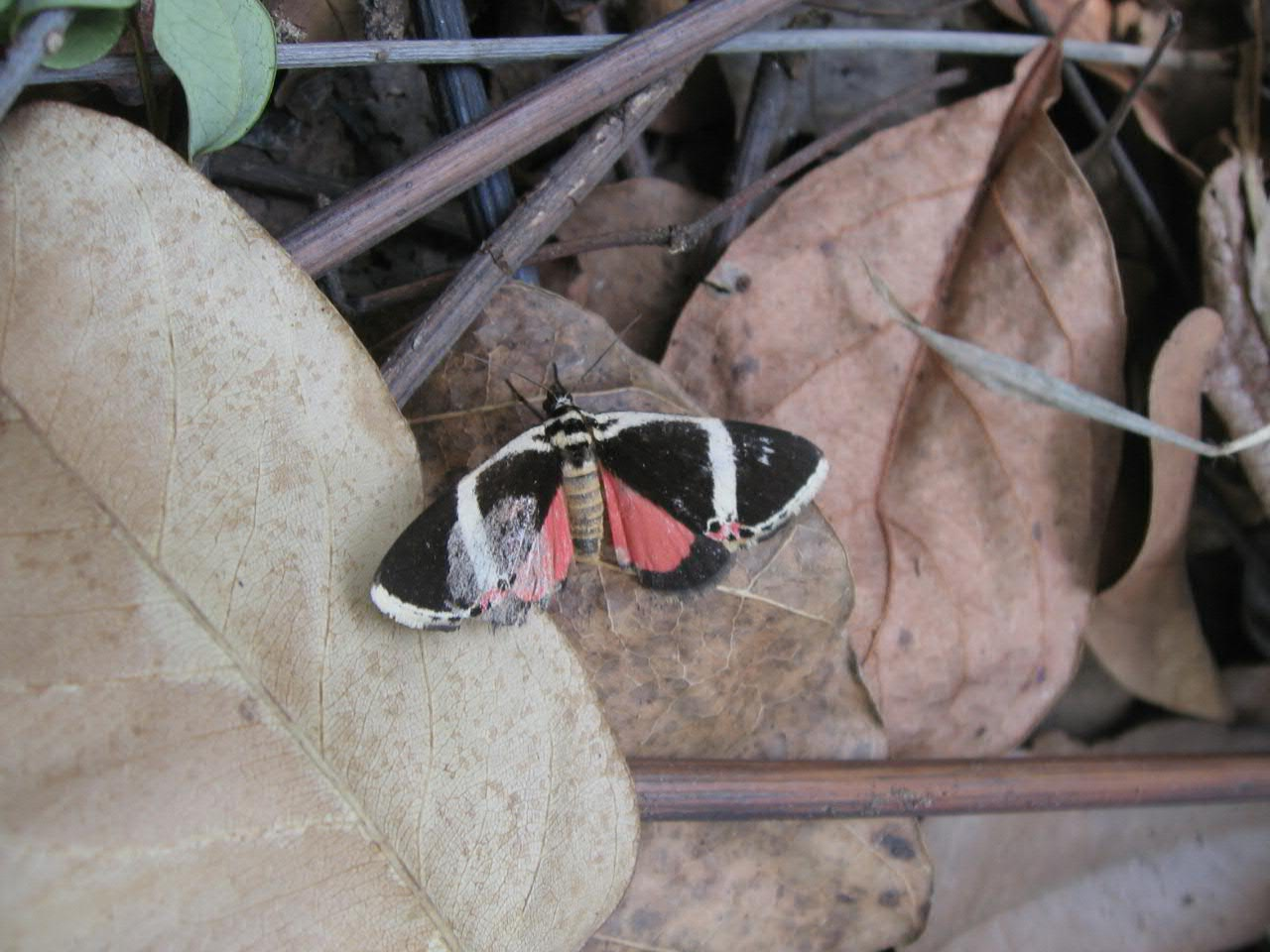
- C. euclidica in Tanzania

Scientific classification
- Kingdom: Animalia
- Phylum: Arthropoda
- Class: Insecta
- Order: Lepidoptera
- Superfamily: Noctuoidea
- Family: Noctuidae (?)
- Subfamily: Catocalinae
- Genus: Colbusa; Walker, 1865

= Colbusa =

Genus of moths

Colbusa is a genus of moths of the family Noctuidae erected by Francis Walker in 1865. There are three species:

- Colbusa discrepans (Karsch 1896)
- Colbusa euclidica Walker 1865
- Colbusa restricta Hampson 1918
