= Coelophoris =

Scientific classification
- Domain: Eukaryota
- Kingdom: Animalia
- Phylum: Arthropoda
- Class: Insecta
- Order: Lepidoptera
- Superfamily: Noctuoidea
- Family: Erebidae
- Subfamily: Calpinae
- Genus: Coelophoris; Mabille, 1900

Genus of moths

Coelophoris is a genus of moths of the family Erebidae. The genus was described by Paul Mabille in 1900.

== Species ==
- Coelophoris andasy Viette, 1965
- Coelophoris ankasoka Viette, 1965
- Coelophoris comorensis Viette, 1981
- Coelophoris lakato Viette, 1965
- Coelophoris lucifer Viette, 1972
- Coelophoris marojejy Viette, 1965
- Coelophoris pluriplaga Viette, 1956
- Coelophoris sogai Viette, 1965
- Coelophoris trilineata Mabille, 1900
