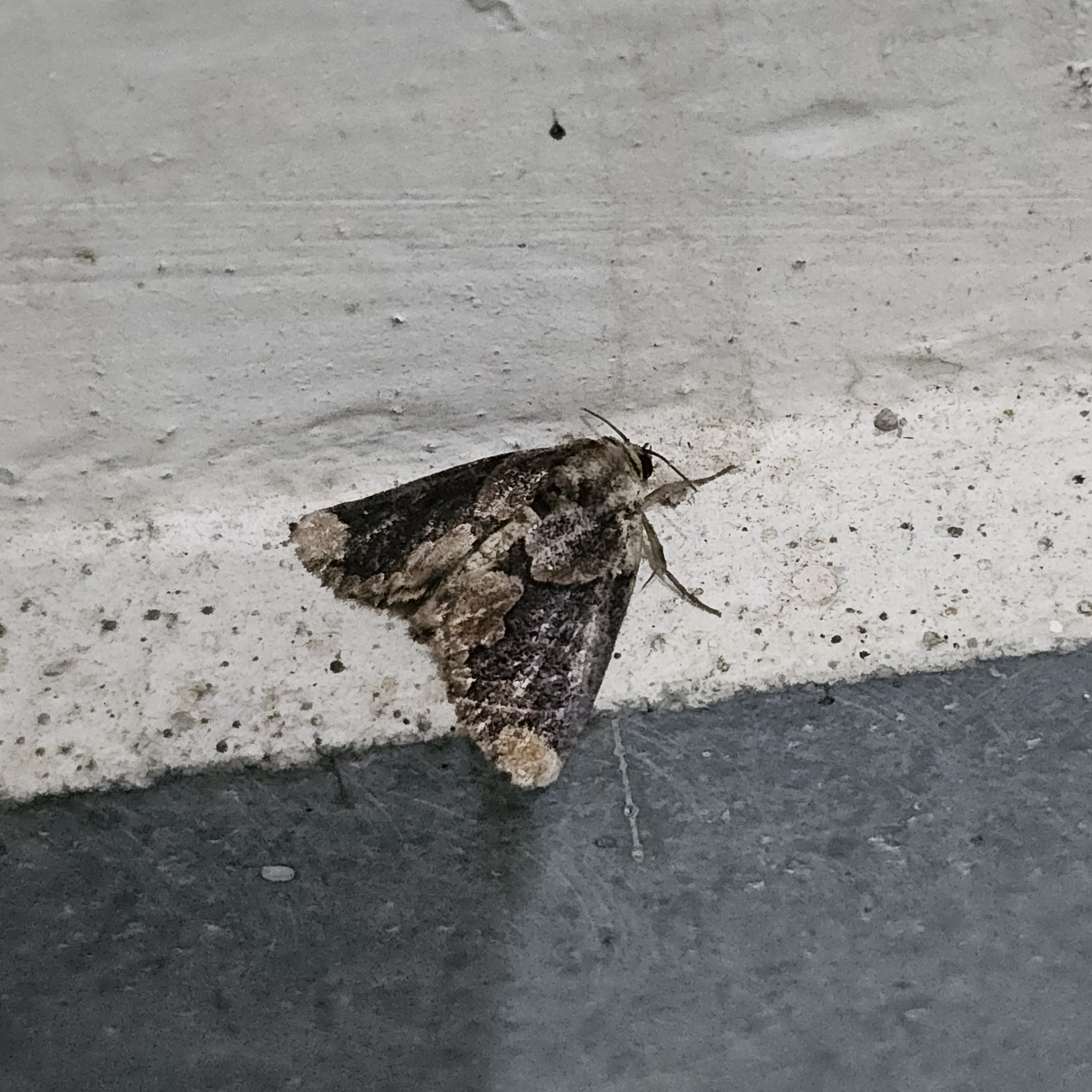
- C. sinuata

Scientific classification
- Kingdom: Animalia
- Phylum: Arthropoda
- Clade: Pancrustacea
- Class: Insecta
- Order: Lepidoptera
- Superfamily: Noctuoidea
- Family: Erebidae
- Subfamily: Calpinae
- Genus: Cymatophoropsis; Hampson, 1894

Synonyms
- Trispila Houlbert, 1921; Thyatirides Kozhantshikov, 1950

= Cymatophoropsis =

Genus of moths

Cymatophoropsis is a genus of moths of the family Noctuidae. The genus was erected by George Hampson in 1894.

== Species ==
- Cymatophoropsis dubernardi (Houlbert, 1921)
- Cymatophoropsis expansa (Houlbert, 1921)
- Cymatophoropsis heurippa (H. Druce, 1889) Panama
- Cymatophoropsis sinuata (Moore, 1879) Bengal
- Cymatophoropsis trimaculata (Bremer, 1861) south-eastern Siberia, Korea, Japan
- Cymatophoropsis unca Houlbert, 1921 Korea, Japan
