= Compsenia =

Scientific classification
- Domain: Eukaryota
- Kingdom: Animalia
- Phylum: Arthropoda
- Class: Insecta
- Order: Lepidoptera
- Superfamily: Noctuoidea
- Family: Erebidae
- Subfamily: Herminiinae
- Genus: Compsenia; Dognin, 1914

Genus of moths

Compsenia is a genus of moths of the family Erebidae. The genus was erected by Paul Dognin in 1914.

== Species ==
- Compsenia area (H. Druce, 1891) Panama
- Compsenia catagrapha Schaus, 1916 French Guiana
- Compsenia furtiva Dognin, 1914 Colombia
- Compsenia gracillima (Herrich-Schäffer, 1870) Cuba
- Compsenia insulalis Schaus, 1916 Cuba
- Compsenia plumbea (Schaus, 1913) Costa Rica
