= Convercala =

Scientific classification
- Domain: Eukaryota
- Kingdom: Animalia
- Phylum: Arthropoda
- Class: Insecta
- Order: Lepidoptera
- Superfamily: Noctuoidea
- Family: Noctuidae (?)
- Subfamily: Catocalinae
- Genus: Convercala; Beck, 1996

Genus of moths

Convercala is a genus of moths of the family Noctuidae erected by Herbert Beck in 1996. Lepidoptera and Some Other Life Forms gives this name as a synonym of Catocala.
