= Carpheria =

Scientific classification
- Kingdom: Animalia
- Phylum: Arthropoda
- Class: Insecta
- Order: Lepidoptera
- Superfamily: Noctuoidea
- Family: Erebidae
- Subfamily: Calpinae
- Genus: Carpheria; Hampson, 1926
- Species: C. aroa

Binomial name
- Carpheria aroa Bethune-Baker, 1906

Synonyms
- Zethes aroa Bethune-Baker, 1906

Genus of moths

Carpheria is a monotypic moth genus of the family Erebidae erected by George Hampson in 1926. Its only species, Carpheria aroa, was first described by George Thomas Bethune-Baker in 1906. It is found in New Guinea.
