= Calpoparia =

Scientific classification
- Domain: Eukaryota
- Kingdom: Animalia
- Phylum: Arthropoda
- Class: Insecta
- Order: Lepidoptera
- Superfamily: Noctuoidea
- Family: Noctuidae
- Genus: Calpoparia; Watson, 1980

Genus of moths

Calpoparia is a genus of moths of the family Noctuidae.

== Species ==
- Calpoparia imparepunctata (Oberthür, 1890)
