= Crambopsis =

Scientific classification
- Kingdom: Animalia
- Phylum: Arthropoda
- Class: Insecta
- Order: Lepidoptera
- Superfamily: Noctuoidea
- Family: Noctuidae
- Genus: Crambopsis; Walker, 1865

Genus of moths

Crambopsis is a genus of moths of the family Noctuidae.

== Species ==
- Crambopsis excludens Walker, 1865
