= Cymoblemma =

Scientific classification
- Kingdom: Animalia
- Phylum: Arthropoda
- Class: Insecta
- Order: Lepidoptera
- Superfamily: Noctuoidea
- Family: Erebidae
- Genus: Cymoblemma; Hampson, 1926
- Species: C. crenelata

Binomial name
- Cymoblemma crenelata Hampson, 1907

Genus of moths

Cymoblemma is a monotypic moth genus of the family Erebidae. Its only species, Cymoblemma crenelata, is found in India and Sri Lanka. Both the genus and the species were first described by George Hampson, the genus in 1926 and the species in 1907.
