= Charmodia =

Scientific classification
- Domain: Eukaryota
- Kingdom: Animalia
- Phylum: Arthropoda
- Class: Insecta
- Order: Lepidoptera
- Superfamily: Noctuoidea
- Family: Erebidae
- Subfamily: Herminiinae
- Genus: Charmodia; Möschler, 1883
- Species: C. vectis

Binomial name
- Charmodia vectis Möschler, 1883

Synonyms
- Hypenodes (?) lysizona H. Druce, 1891; Mastigophorus pasithea Schaus, 1913

Genus and species of moth

Charmodia is a monotypic moth genus of the family Erebidae. Its only species, Charmodia vectis, is known from Suriname, Panama and Costa Rica. Both the genus and the species were first described by Heinrich Benno Möschler in 1883.
