= Ceratostrotia =

Scientific classification
- Domain: Eukaryota
- Kingdom: Animalia
- Phylum: Arthropoda
- Class: Insecta
- Order: Lepidoptera
- Superfamily: Noctuoidea
- Family: Noctuidae
- Subfamily: Acontiinae
- Genus: Ceratostrotia; Warren in Seitz, 1913
- Species: C. melanchlaena

Binomial name
- Ceratostrotia melanchlaena C. Swinhoe, 1891

Synonyms
- Tarache melanchlaena C. Swinhoe, 1891

Genus of moths

Ceratostrotia is a monotypic moth genus of the family Noctuidae described by Warren in 1913. Its only species, Ceratostrotia melanchlaena, was first described by Swinhoe in 1891. It is found in India.

== Subspecies ==
- Ceratostrotia melanchlaena rubidata Warren, 1913
