= Chamyrisilla =

Scientific classification
- Domain: Eukaryota
- Kingdom: Animalia
- Phylum: Arthropoda
- Class: Insecta
- Order: Lepidoptera
- Superfamily: Noctuoidea
- Family: Noctuidae
- Subfamily: Acontiinae
- Genus: Chamyrisilla; Draudt, 1950
- Species: C. ampolleta

Binomial name
- Chamyrisilla ampolleta Draudt, 1950

Genus of moths

Chamyrisilla is a monotypic moth genus of the family Noctuidae. Its only species, Chamyrisilla ampolleta, is found in China. Both the genus and species were first described by Max Wilhelm Karl Draudt in 1950.
