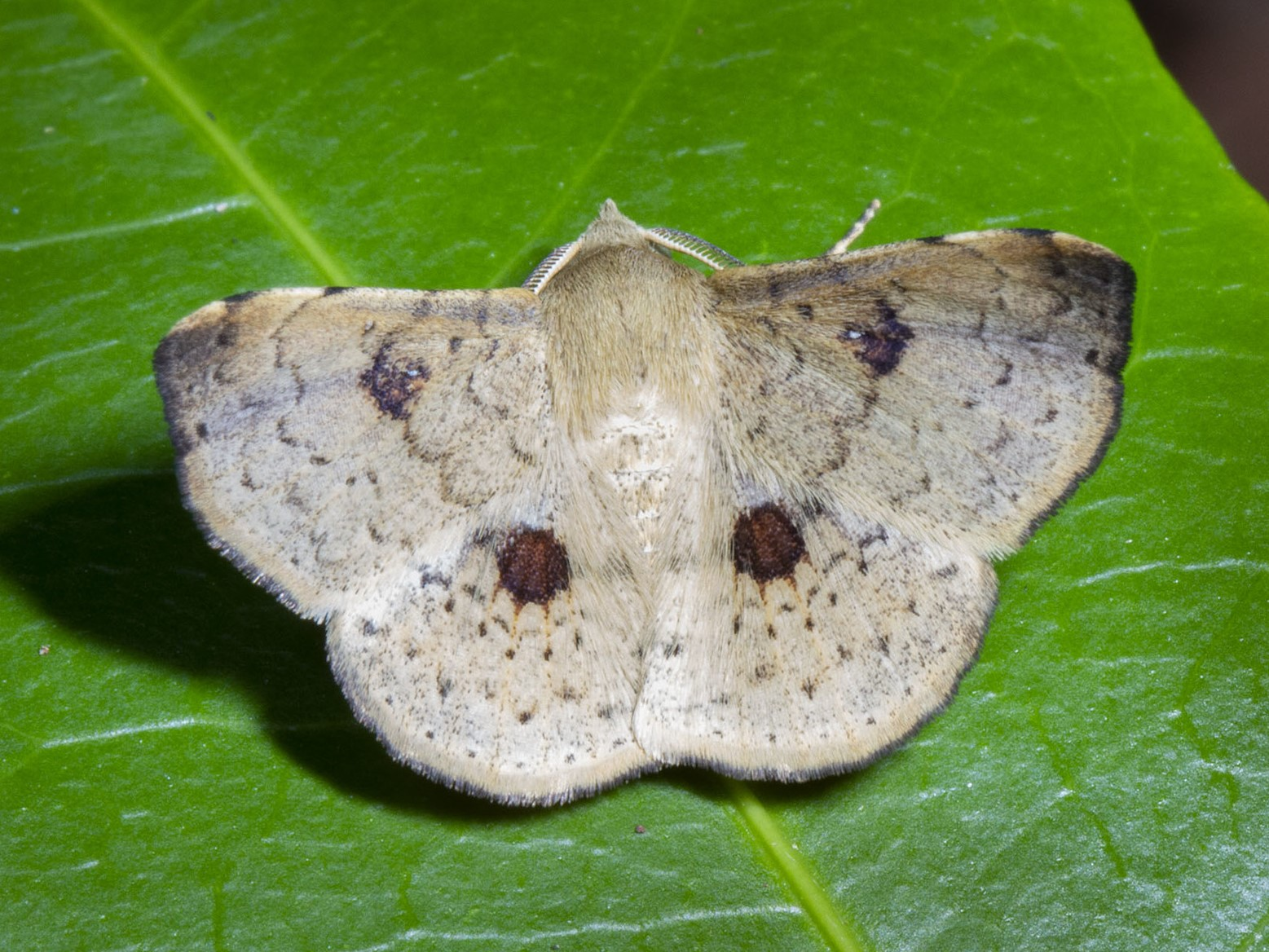

Scientific classification
- Kingdom: Animalia
- Phylum: Arthropoda
- Class: Insecta
- Order: Lepidoptera
- Superfamily: Noctuoidea
- Family: Erebidae
- Subfamily: Calpinae
- Genus: Claterna; Walker, 1858
- Species: C. cydonia

Binomial name
- Claterna cydonia (Cramer, [1775])

Synonyms
- Phalaena cydonia Cramer, [1775] 1779; Focilla submemorans Walker, 1858; Claterna exagens Walker, 1858; Claterna affinis Rothschild, [1915] 1916

= Claterna =

Claterna perinetensis

Genus of moths

Claterna is a monotypic moth genus of the family Noctuidae erected by Francis Walker in 1858. Its only species, Claterna cydonia, was first described by Pieter Cramer in 1775.

== Description ==
Species are similar to Episparis, differ in the palpi having a longer third joint and ciliated antennae in the male. Hindwings with angled outer margin instead of being produced to a point. Female with the outer margin of both wings very slightly angled.

The species shows slight sexual dimorphism. In the male, the apex in forewings is more produced, whereas in the female the apex is slightly angled. Body is greyish, tinged with brownish on the forewings and more mauve on the hindwings in both sexes. Caterpillars are known to feed on Mussaenda species.

== Distribution ==
It is found on the Indian subcontinent and from Sri Lanka, to New Guinea.
