= Cryphioides =

Scientific classification
- Domain: Eukaryota
- Kingdom: Animalia
- Phylum: Arthropoda
- Class: Insecta
- Order: Lepidoptera
- Superfamily: Noctuoidea
- Family: Noctuidae
- Subfamily: Acontiinae
- Genus: Cryphioides; Berio, 1964
- Species: C. ocellata

Binomial name
- Cryphioides ocellata Berio, 1964

Genus of moths

Cryphioides is a monotypic moth genus of the family Noctuidae. Its only species, Cryphioides ocellata, is found in Madagascar. Both the genus and species was first described by Emilio Berio in 1964.
