= Cladenia =

Scientific classification
- Domain: Eukaryota
- Kingdom: Animalia
- Phylum: Arthropoda
- Class: Insecta
- Order: Lepidoptera
- Superfamily: Noctuoidea
- Family: Erebidae
- Subfamily: Calpinae
- Genus: Cladenia; Möschler, 1880
- Species: C. mocha

Binomial name
- Cladenia mocha Möschler, 1880

Synonyms
- Cladenia venosa Schaus, 1911

Genus of moths

Cladenia is a monotypic moth genus of the family Erebidae. Its only species, Cladenia mocha, is found in Suriname. Both the genus and the species were first described by Heinrich Benno Möschler in 1880.
