= Chibidokuga =

Scientific classification
- Kingdom: Animalia
- Phylum: Arthropoda
- Clade: Pancrustacea
- Class: Insecta
- Order: Lepidoptera
- Superfamily: Noctuoidea
- Family: Erebidae
- Subfamily: Calpinae
- Genus: Chibidokuga; Matsumura, 1933

Genus of moths

Chibidokuga is a genus of moths of the family Erebidae. The genus was erected by Shōnen Matsumura in 1933.

== Species ==
There are two accepted species:

- Chibidokuga hypenodes Inoue, 1979 – Japan
- Chibidokuga nigra (Hampson, 1898) – Sikkim
