= Crionica =

Scientific classification
- Kingdom: Animalia
- Phylum: Arthropoda
- Class: Insecta
- Order: Lepidoptera
- Superfamily: Noctuoidea
- Family: Erebidae
- Subfamily: Calpinae
- Genus: Crionica; Hampson, 1926

Genus of moths

Crionica is a genus of moths of the family Erebidae. The genus was erected by George Hampson in 1926.

== Species ==
- Crionica bifurcata Gaede, 1939
- Crionica cervicornis Fawcett, 1917
- Crionica diversipennis Gaede, 1939
- Crionica incurvata Gaede, 1939
