= Cofimpacia =

Scientific classification
- Kingdom: Animalia
- Phylum: Arthropoda
- Clade: Pancrustacea
- Class: Insecta
- Order: Lepidoptera
- Superfamily: Noctuoidea
- Family: Erebidae
- Subfamily: Calpinae
- Genus: Cofimpacia; Holloway, 1979

Genus of moths

Cofimpacia is a genus of moths of the family Erebidae. The genus was erected by Jeremy Daniel Holloway in 1979.

== Species ==
- Cofimpacia chusaroides Holloway, 1979
- Cofimpacia luteata Holloway, 1979
- Cofimpacia violacea Holloway, 1979
