= Craptignapa =

Scientific classification
- Domain: Eukaryota
- Kingdom: Animalia
- Phylum: Arthropoda
- Class: Insecta
- Order: Lepidoptera
- Superfamily: Noctuoidea
- Family: Erebidae
- Subfamily: Calpinae
- Genus: Craptignapa; Nye, 1975
- Species: C. delicata

Binomial name
- Craptignapa delicata Bethune-Baker, 1906

Synonyms
- Pangraptica Hampson, 1926

Genus of moths

Craptignapa is a genus of moths of the family Erebidae described by Ian W. B. Nye in 1975. Its only species, Craptignapa delicata, was first described by George Thomas Bethune-Baker in 1906. It is found in New Guinea.
