= Cabralia =

Scientific classification
- Domain: Eukaryota
- Kingdom: Animalia
- Phylum: Arthropoda
- Class: Insecta
- Order: Lepidoptera
- Superfamily: Noctuoidea
- Family: Erebidae
- Subfamily: Calpinae
- Genus: Cabralia; Moore, 1882
- Species: C. trifasciata

Binomial name
- Cabralia trifasciata Moore, 1882

Genus of moths

Cabralia is a genus of moths of the family Noctuidae, containing only a single species, Cabralia trifasciata; a second species (judsoni) was historically misclassified, but in 2010 was determined to belong to the genus Rhosus in the subfamily Agaristinae, leaving C. trifasciata as the sole remaining member of its genus.
