= List of noctuid genera: E =

The huge moth family Noctuidae contains the following genera:

A B C D E F G H I J K L M N O P Q R S T U V W X Y Z

- Ebertidia
- Ecbolemia
- Eccleta
- Eccrita
- Echana
- Echanella
- Echinocampa
- Eclipsea
- Ecnomia
- Ecpatia
- Ecthetis
- Ecthymia
- Ectoblemma
- Ectochela
- Ectogonia
- Ectogoniella
- Ectolopha
- Ectopatria
- Ectrogatha
- Edessena
- Edlaeveria
- Edmondsia
- Edyma
- Effractilis
- Eggyna
- Egira
- Egnasia
- Egnasides
- Egone
- Egryrlon
- Egybolis
- Eicomorpha
- Elaemima
- Elaeodopsis
- Elaphria
- Elaphristis
- Elecussa
- Eleemosia
- Elegarda
- Elegocampa
- Elesotis
- Elixoia
- Elocussa
- Elousa
- Elpia
- Elusa
- Elwesia
- Elydna
- Elygea
- Elyptron
- Elyra
- Emarginea
- Emariannia
- Emboloecia
- Emmelia
- Empelathra
- Empusada
- Enargia
- Encruphion
- Enea
- Enedena
- Engelhardtia
- Engusanacantha
- Enigmogramma
- Enispa
- Enispades
- Enispodes
- Enmonodia
- Enmonodiops
- Ensipia
- Enterpia
- Entomogramma
- Enydra
- Eogena
- Eopaectes
- Eordaea
- Eosphoropteryx
- Epa
- Epharmottomena
- Ephesia
- Ephyrodes
- Epicarsia
- Epicausis
- Epicerynea
- Epiconcana
- Epicyrtica
- Epidelta
- Epidemas
- Epidromia
- Epiglaea
- Epigrypera
- Epigrypodes
- Epilecta
- Epilitha
- Epimecia
- Epimeciodes
- Epinyctis
- Epioecia
- Epipsammia
- Epipsilia
- Epipsiliamorpha
- Epischausia
- Episcotia
- Episema
- Episparina
- Episparis
- Episparonia
- Episteme
- Epistrema
- Epitausa
- Epithisanotia
- Epitomiptera
- Epitripta
- Epizeuxis
- Epopsima
- Eporectis
- Equatosypna
- Erastrifacies
- Erastriopis
- Erastroides
- Ercheia
- Erebophasma
- Erebostrota
- Erebothrix
- Erebus
- Eremaula
- Eremnophanes
- Eremobastis
- Eremobia
- Eremobina
- Eremochlaena
- Eremochroa
- Eremodrina
- Eremohadena
- Eremonoma
- Eremophysa
- Eremopola
- Ericathia
- Ericeia
- Eriocera
- Eriopyga
- Eriopygodes
- Erioscele
- Erna
- Erocha
- Eromene
- Eromidia
- Erygansa
- Erygia
- Erymella
- Erythroecia
- Erythrophaia
- Erythroplusia
- Erythrotis
- Escandia
- Escaria
- Escua
- Essonistis
- Estagrotis
- Esteparia
- Esthlodora
- Estimata
- Ethionodes
- Ethiopica
- Ethioterpia
- Euaethiops
- Euagrotis
- Euamiana
- Euaontia
- Eublarginea
- Eublemma
- Eublemmara
- Eublemmistis
- Eublemmoides
- Eubolina
- Eubryopterella
- Eucala
- Eucalimia
- Eucalyptra
- Eucampima
- Eucapnodes
- Eucarta
- Eucatephia
- Euchalcia
- Euchoristea
- Euchromalia
- Eucirroedia
- Eucladodes
- Euclidia
- Euclidiana
- Euclidina
- Euclystis
- Eucocytia
- Eucoptocnemis
- Eucora
- Eucosmocara
- Eucropia
- Eucyclomma
- Eudaphaenura
- Euderaea
- Eudesmeola
- Eudipna
- Eudocima
- Eudragana
- Eudrapa
- Eudryas
- Eudyops
- Euedwardsia
- Eueretagrotis
- Eugatha
- Eugnathia
- Eugnorisma
- Eugoniella
- Eugorna
- Eugrammodes
- Eugraphe
- Eugrapta
- Eugraptoblemma
- Euharveya
- Euherrichia
- Euheterospila
- Euhypena
- Euimata
- Euippodes
- Eulaphygma
- Eulepa
- Eulepidotis
- Euleucyptera
- Eulintneria
- Eulithosia
- Eulocastra
- Eulonche
- Eulymnia
- Eumestleta
- Eumichtis
- Eumichtochroa
- Eumicremma
- Euminucia
- Eumuelleria
- Euneophlebia
- Eunetis
- Eunimbatana
- Euonychodes
- Eupalindia
- Eupanychis
- Euparthenos
- Eupatula
- Euphiusa
- Euplexia
- Euplexidia
- Euplocia
- Eupsephopaectes
- Eupseudomorpha
- Eupsilia
- Eupsoropsis
- Eurabila
- Eurogramma
- Eurois
- Euromoia
- Euros
- Eurypsyche
- Euryschema
- Eurythmus
- Eusceptis
- Euschesis
- Euscirrhopterus
- Euscotia
- Eusimara
- Eusimplex
- Eustrotia
- Eustrotiopis
- Eutactis
- Eutamsia
- Eutelephia
- Eutermina
- Euterpiodes
- Euthales
- Eutheiaplusia
- Euthermesia
- Eutolype
- Eutoreuma
- Eutornoptera
- Eutrichopidia
- Eutricopis
- Eutrinita
- Eutrogia
- Euviminia
- Euwilemania
- Euxenistis
- Euxoa
- Euxoamorpha
- Euxootera
- Euxoullia
- Euzancla
- Evanina
- Eviridemas
- Evisa
- Exagrotis
- Exarnis
- Exathetis
- Exophyla
- Exsula
- Extremoplusia
- Extremypena
- Exyra
