= E. metallica =

E. metallica may refer to:

- Epicyrtica metallica, a moth species found in Australia
- Eupanacra metallica, a moth species found from north-western India across Nepal, Bhutan, Bangladesh and northern Myanmar to south-western China

== See also ==
- Metallica (disambiguation)
