= B. bidentata =

B. bidentata may refer to:

- Bauhinia bidentata, a flowering plant
- Bayadera bidentata, a large damselfly
- Bertula bidentata, a Taiwanese moth
