= Enydra =

Enydra may refer to:

- Enydra (moth), a genus of moths in the family Noctuidae
- Enydra (plant), a genus of plants in the family Asteraceae
