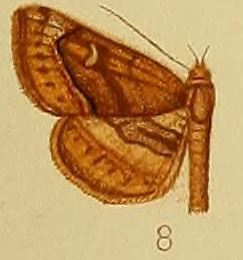

Scientific classification
- Kingdom: Animalia
- Phylum: Arthropoda
- Class: Insecta
- Order: Lepidoptera
- Superfamily: Noctuoidea
- Family: Erebidae
- Genus: Eucampima
- Species: E. coenotype

Binomial name
- Eucampima coenotype (Hampson, 1910)

Synonyms
- Zethes coenotype Hampson, 1910

= Eucampima coenotype =

Species of moth

Eucampima coenotype is a moth of the family Erebidae first described by George Hampson in 1910.

Its head, thorax and abdomen are grey mixed with brown, and the forewings are grey suffused and irrorated (sprinkled) with reddish brown and dark brown. The wingspan is 28 mm.

== Distribution ==
It is found in Zambia.

== See also ==
- List of moths of Zambia
