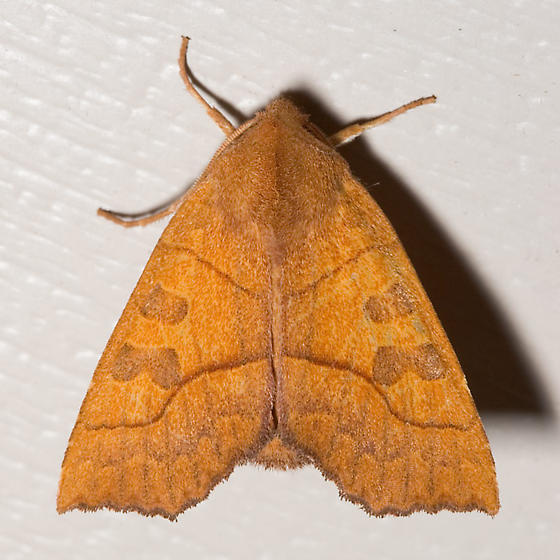

Scientific classification
- Kingdom: Animalia
- Phylum: Arthropoda
- Class: Insecta
- Order: Lepidoptera
- Superfamily: Noctuoidea
- Family: Noctuidae
- Genus: Eucirroedia
- Species: E. pampina

Binomial name
- Eucirroedia pampina (Guenée, 1852)

Synonyms
- Cirroedia pampina Guenée, 1852; Eucirroedia pampinella (Strand, 1916) (form); Eucirroedia brunneoochracea (Strand, 1916) (form)

= Eucirroedia pampina =

Scalloped sallow

Species of moth

Eucirroedia pampina, the scalloped sallow, is a moth of the family Noctuidae. It is found from British Columbia to Nova Scotia, south to Florida, west to Arkansas and Wisconsin.

The wingspan is 36–44 mm. Adults are on wing from August to December, with peaks in September and October.

The larvae feed on the leaves of black cherry, choke cherry and maple.

== Subspecies ==
- Eucirroedia pampina pampina
- Eucirroedia pampina glenwoodi (Colorado, ...)
