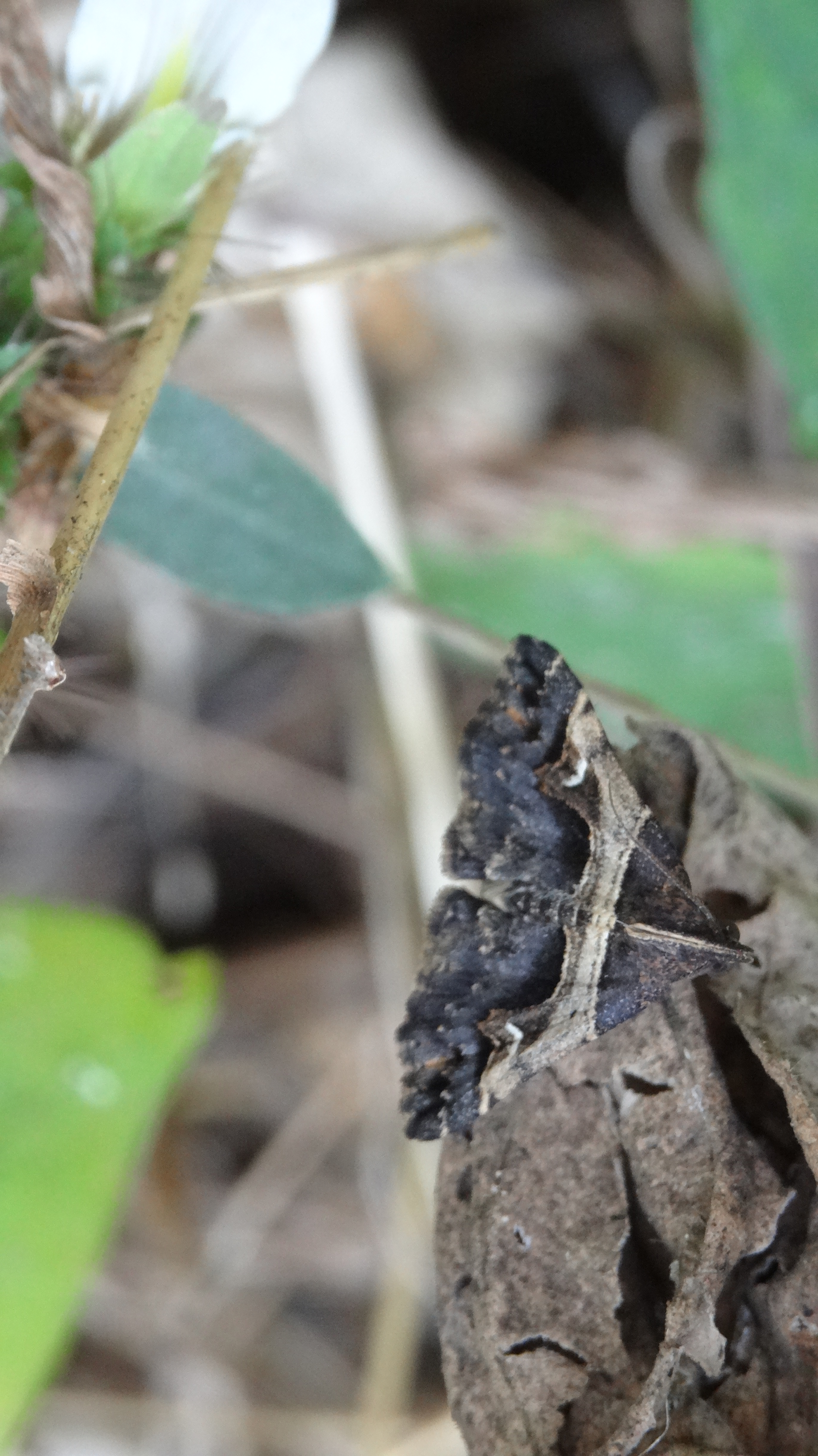

Scientific classification
- Kingdom: Animalia
- Phylum: Arthropoda
- Class: Insecta
- Order: Lepidoptera
- Superfamily: Noctuoidea
- Family: Erebidae
- Genus: Bertula
- Species: B. abjudicalis

Binomial name
- Bertula abjudicalis (Walker, 1859)

Synonyms
- Bocana tumidalis Walker, [1859]; Bertula thrisalis Walker, 1859

= Bertula abjudicalis =

Species of moth

Bertula abjudicalis is a moth of the family Noctuidae first described by Francis Walker in 1859. It is found in India, Thailand, Laos, Vietnam, Taiwan and from Sri Lanka to Australia, where it has been recorded from New South Wales.

== Description ==
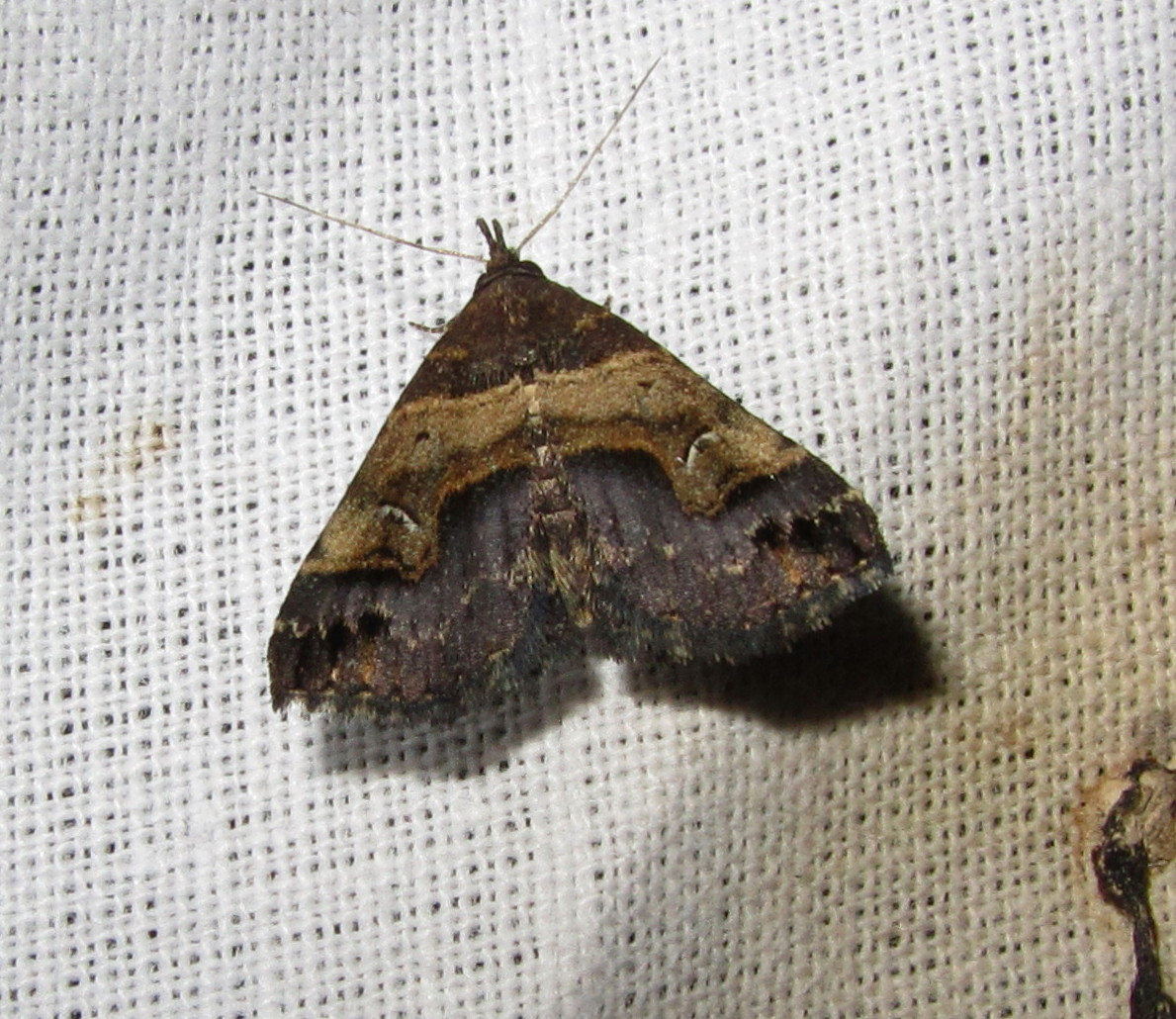

Its wingspan is about 26 mm. Males with recurved palpi over vertex of head and thorax. Second joint fringed with hair in front and with tufts of very long hair from the inner side. The third joint with tufts of long hair. Fore tibia without a sheath. Forewings with a costal fold acting as a retinaculum, which is narrow. Head and thorax dark red brown. Abdomen fuscous with a pale line on basal segment. Forewings with reddish-brown basal area. An oblique antemedial ochreous line and a white lunule at end of cell present. There is a postmedial line sinuous from the costa to vein 4, where it is angled and bent inwards to below the end of cell. The area between the lines is brownish ochreous with traces of a medial line. An indistinct sinuous submarginal line can be seen. Hindwings dark fuscous with indistinct pale waved medial and submarginal lines. Ventral side with pale basal area. There is a cell-spot and the lines are more distinct. Some specimens have a much darker area between antemedial and postmedial lines of forewings.
