= Escandia =

Scientific classification
- Kingdom: Animalia
- Phylum: Arthropoda
- Class: Insecta
- Order: Lepidoptera
- Superfamily: Noctuoidea
- Family: Noctuidae
- Subfamily: Acontiinae
- Genus: Escandia; Dyar, 1914
- Species: E. fimbrialis

Binomial name
- Escandia fimbrialis Dyar, 1914

Genus of moths

Escandia is a monotypic moth genus of the family Noctuidae. Its only species, Escandia fimbrialis, is found in Panama. Both the genus and species were first described by Harrison Gray Dyar Jr. in 1914.

== Taxonomy ==
The Global Lepidoptera Names Index gives this name as a synonym of Lycaugesia Dognin, 1910.
