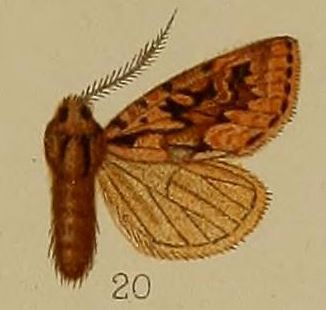

Scientific classification
- Kingdom: Animalia
- Phylum: Arthropoda
- Class: Insecta
- Order: Lepidoptera
- Superfamily: Noctuoidea
- Family: Noctuidae
- Genus: Estimata
- Species: E. clavata

Binomial name
- Estimata clavata (Hampson 1907)

Synonyms
- Epipsilia clavata Hampson, 1907

= Estimata clavata =

Species of moth

Estimata clavata is a moth of the family Noctuidae. It is found in India.
