= Epicausis smithii =

Scientific classification
- Kingdom: Animalia
- Phylum: Arthropoda
- Class: Insecta
- Order: Lepidoptera
- Superfamily: Noctuoidea
- Family: Noctuidae
- Genus: Epicausis
- Species: E. smithii

Binomial name
- Epicausis smithii (Mabille, 1880)

Synonyms
- Daphnaeura smithii Mabille, 1880; Epicausis lanigera Butler, 1880

Species of moth

Epicausis smithii is a species of moth of the family Noctuidae. It is found in Madagascar.

It has a wingspan of about 55–62 mm. The thorax is dark red, the abdomen black, the forewings are orange yellow with a broad black costa.
