= Epidemas obscurus =

Scientific classification
- Domain: Eukaryota
- Kingdom: Animalia
- Phylum: Arthropoda
- Class: Insecta
- Order: Lepidoptera
- Superfamily: Noctuoidea
- Family: Noctuidae
- Tribe: Xylenini
- Subtribe: Xylenina
- Genus: Epidemas
- Species: E. obscurus

Binomial name
- Epidemas obscurus Smith, 1903

Synonyms
- Epidemas melanographa Hampson, 1906

Species of moth

Epidemas obscurus is a species of cutworm or dart moth in the family Noctuidae.

The MONA or Hodges number for Epidemas obscurus is 10003.
