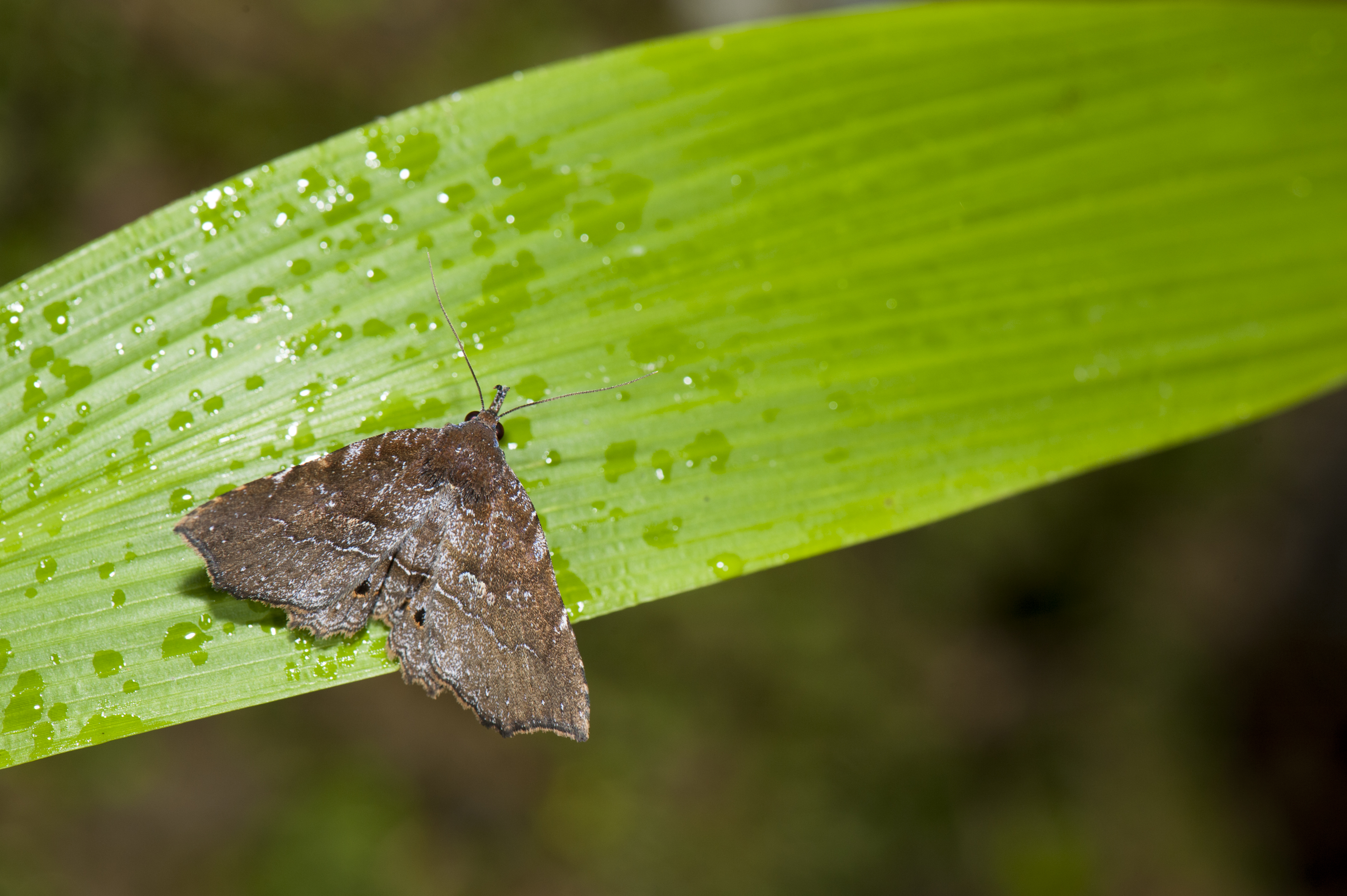

Scientific classification
- Domain: Eukaryota
- Kingdom: Animalia
- Phylum: Arthropoda
- Class: Insecta
- Order: Lepidoptera
- Superfamily: Noctuoidea
- Family: Erebidae
- Genus: Eutrogia
- Species: E. morosa

Binomial name
- Eutrogia morosa (Moore, 1882)

Synonyms
- Egnasia morosa Moore, 1882; Egnasia castanea f. morosa; Egnasia inconspicua Wileman, 1915

= Eutrogia morosa =

Species of moth

Eutrogia morosa is a moth of the family Noctuidae first described by Frederic Moore in 1882. It is found in Taiwan and Sikkim, India.

The wingspan is about 42 mm. Adults are dark chocolate brown with a purplish tinge. The forewing with traces of subbasal and antemedial lines. The hindwings have a pale speck at the end of the cell and a sinuous medial line, with some dark specks with yellow scales round them towards the inner margin. There is a submarginal series of white specks.
