= Echanella hirsutipennis =

Scientific classification
- Domain: Eukaryota
- Kingdom: Animalia
- Phylum: Arthropoda
- Class: Insecta
- Order: Lepidoptera
- Superfamily: Noctuoidea
- Family: Erebidae
- Genus: Echanella
- Species: E. hirsutipennis

Binomial name
- Echanella hirsutipennis Robinson, 1975

Species of moth

Echanella hirsutipennis is a species of moth of the family Erebidae first described by Robinson in 1975. It is endemic to Fiji.
