= Erastroides oliviaria =

Scientific classification
- Kingdom: Animalia
- Phylum: Arthropoda
- Class: Insecta
- Order: Lepidoptera
- Superfamily: Noctuoidea
- Family: Noctuidae
- Genus: Erastroides
- Species: E. oliviaria

Binomial name
- Erastroides oliviaria Hampson, 1893

Species of moth

Erastroides oliviaria is a moth of the family Noctuidae first described by George Hampson in 1893. It is found in Sri Lanka.
