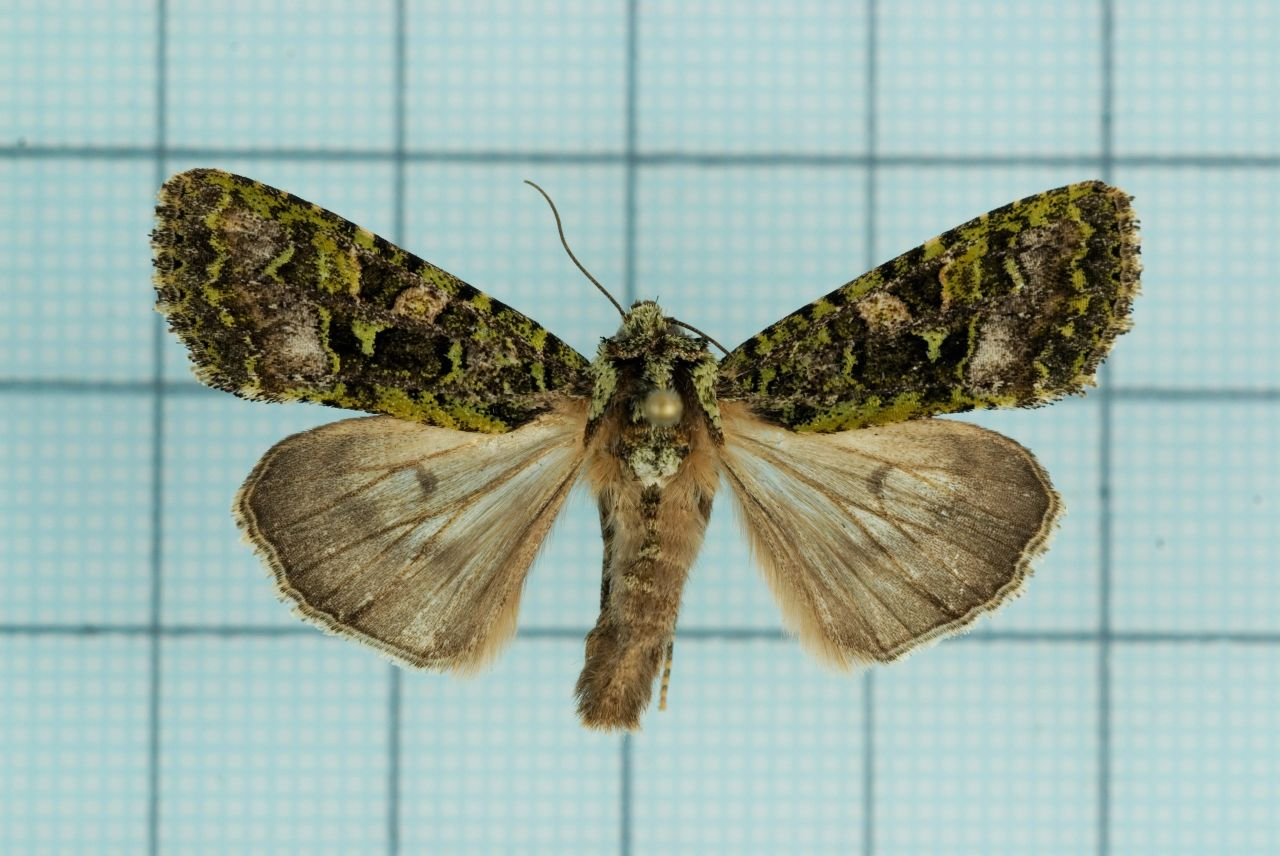

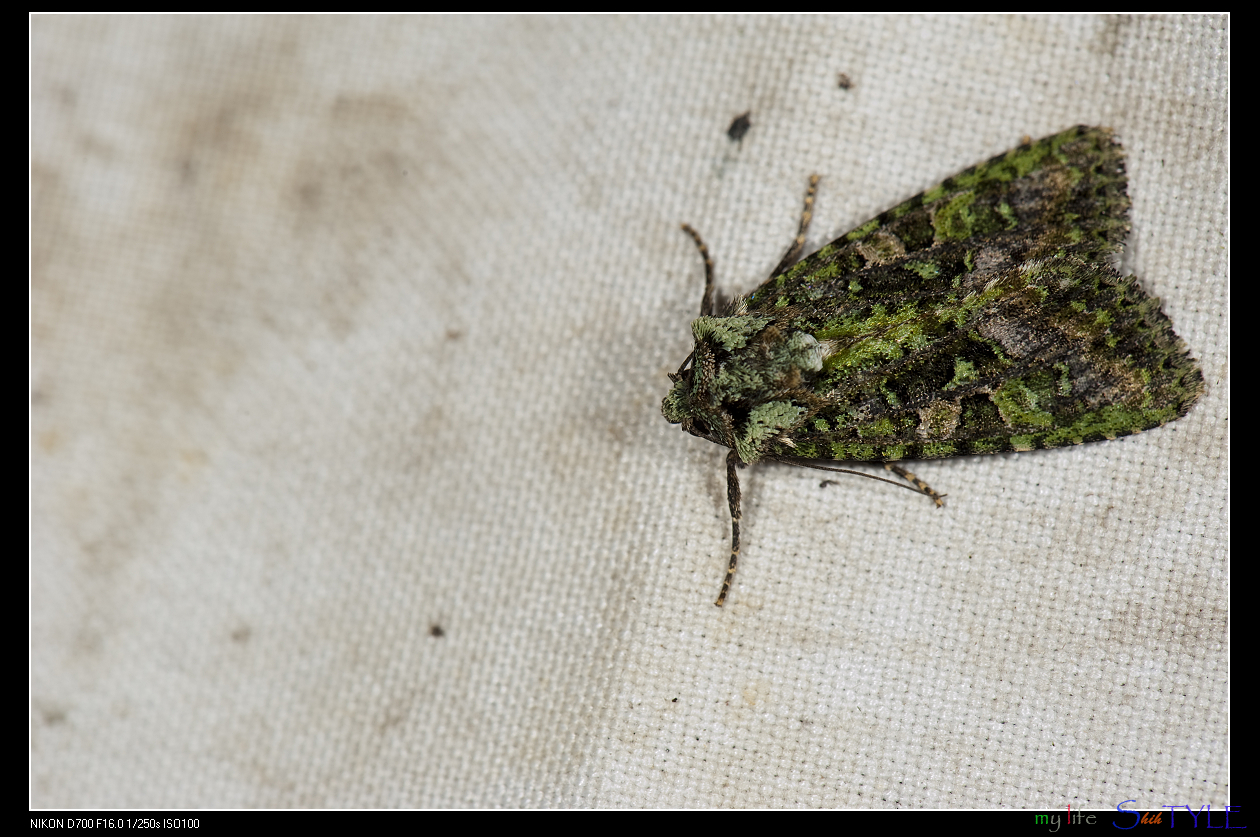

Scientific classification
- Domain: Eukaryota
- Kingdom: Animalia
- Phylum: Arthropoda
- Class: Insecta
- Order: Lepidoptera
- Superfamily: Noctuoidea
- Family: Noctuidae
- Genus: Euplexidia
- Species: E. pallidivirens

Binomial name
- Euplexidia pallidivirens Yoshimoto, 1987

= Euplexidia pallidivirens =

Species of moth

Euplexidia pallidivirens is a moth in the family Noctuidae. It is found in Taiwan.
