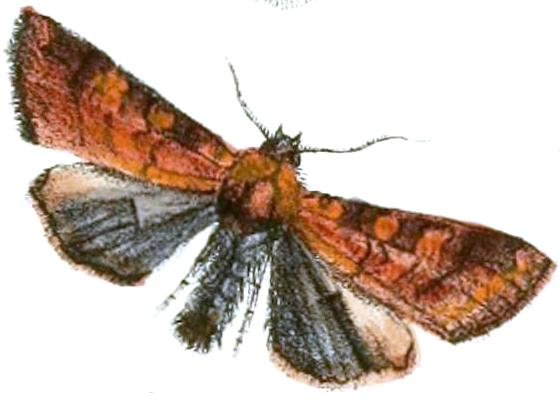

Scientific classification
- Domain: Eukaryota
- Kingdom: Animalia
- Phylum: Arthropoda
- Class: Insecta
- Order: Lepidoptera
- Superfamily: Noctuoidea
- Family: Noctuidae
- Genus: Estagrotis
- Species: E. cuprea

Binomial name
- Estagrotis cuprea (Moore, 1867)

Synonyms
- Gortyna cuprea Moore, 1867

= Estagrotis cuprea =

Species of moth

Estagrotis cuprea is a species of moth of the family Noctuidae. It is found in India (including Darjeeling).
