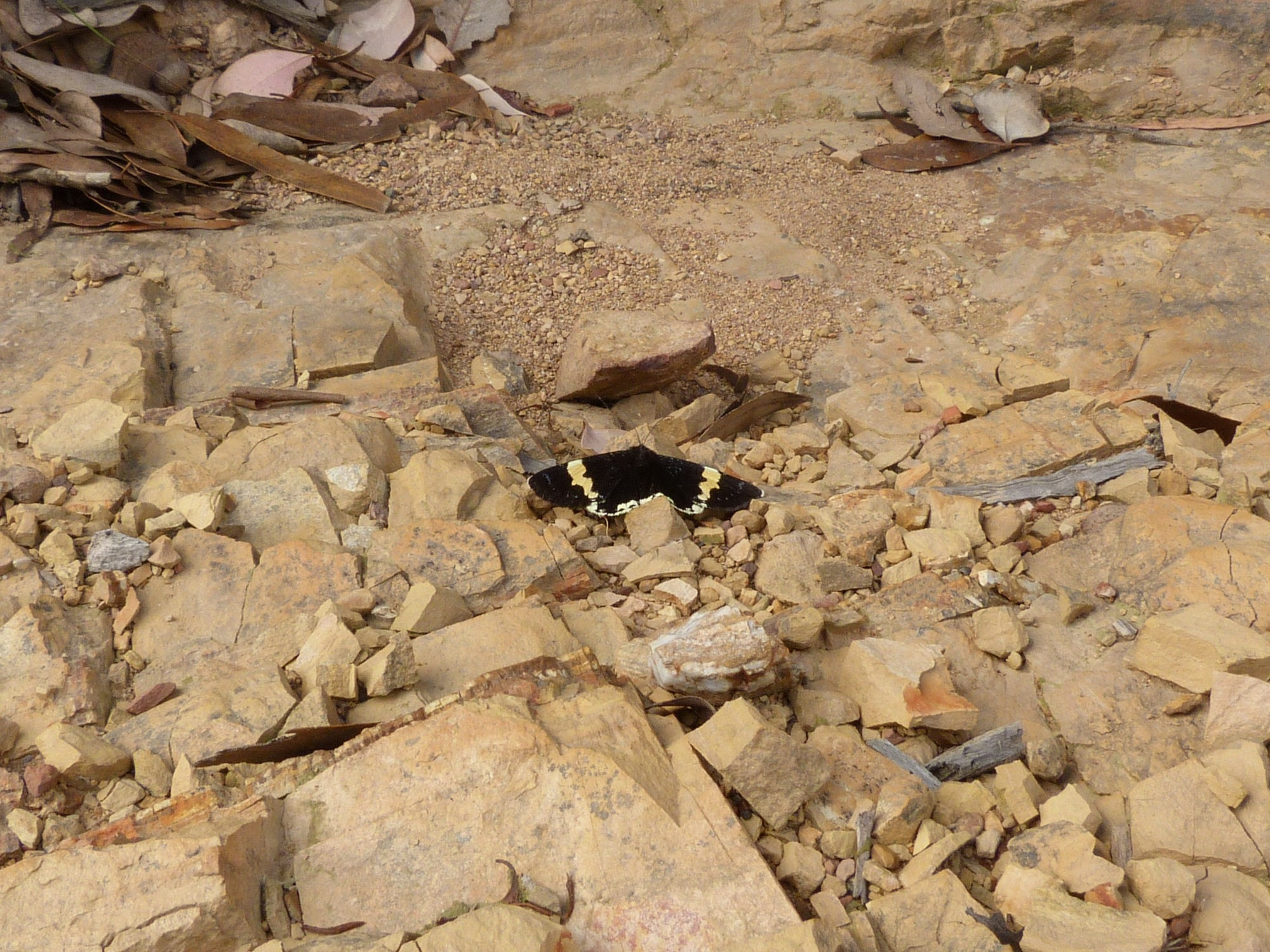

Scientific classification
- Domain: Eukaryota
- Kingdom: Animalia
- Phylum: Arthropoda
- Class: Insecta
- Order: Lepidoptera
- Superfamily: Noctuoidea
- Family: Noctuidae
- Genus: Eutrichopidia
- Species: E. latinus

Binomial name
- Eutrichopidia latinus (Donovan, 1805)

Synonyms
- Phalaena latinus Donovan, 1805

= Eutrichopidia latinus =

Species of moth

Eutrichopidia latinus is a species of moth of the family Noctuidae. It is known from eastern Australia, including Queensland, New South Wales, the Australian Capital Territory, Victoria, South Australia and Tasmania.

The larvae feed on Hibbertia obtusifolia and Haloragis teucriodes.
