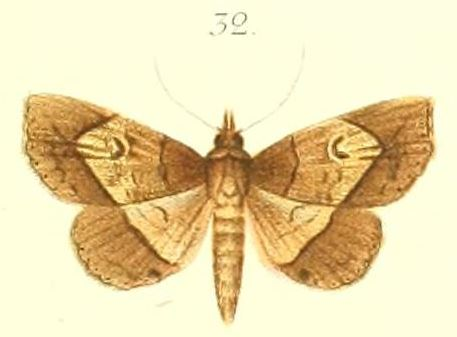

Scientific classification
- Domain: Eukaryota
- Kingdom: Animalia
- Phylum: Arthropoda
- Class: Insecta
- Order: Lepidoptera
- Superfamily: Noctuoidea
- Family: Erebidae
- Genus: Eugrapta
- Species: E. angulata

Binomial name
- Eugrapta angulata (Pagenstecher, 1900)

Synonyms
- Zethes angulata Pagenstecher, 1900

= Eugrapta angulata =

Species of moth

Eugrapta angulata is a moth of the family Noctuidae. It is found in New Guinea.
