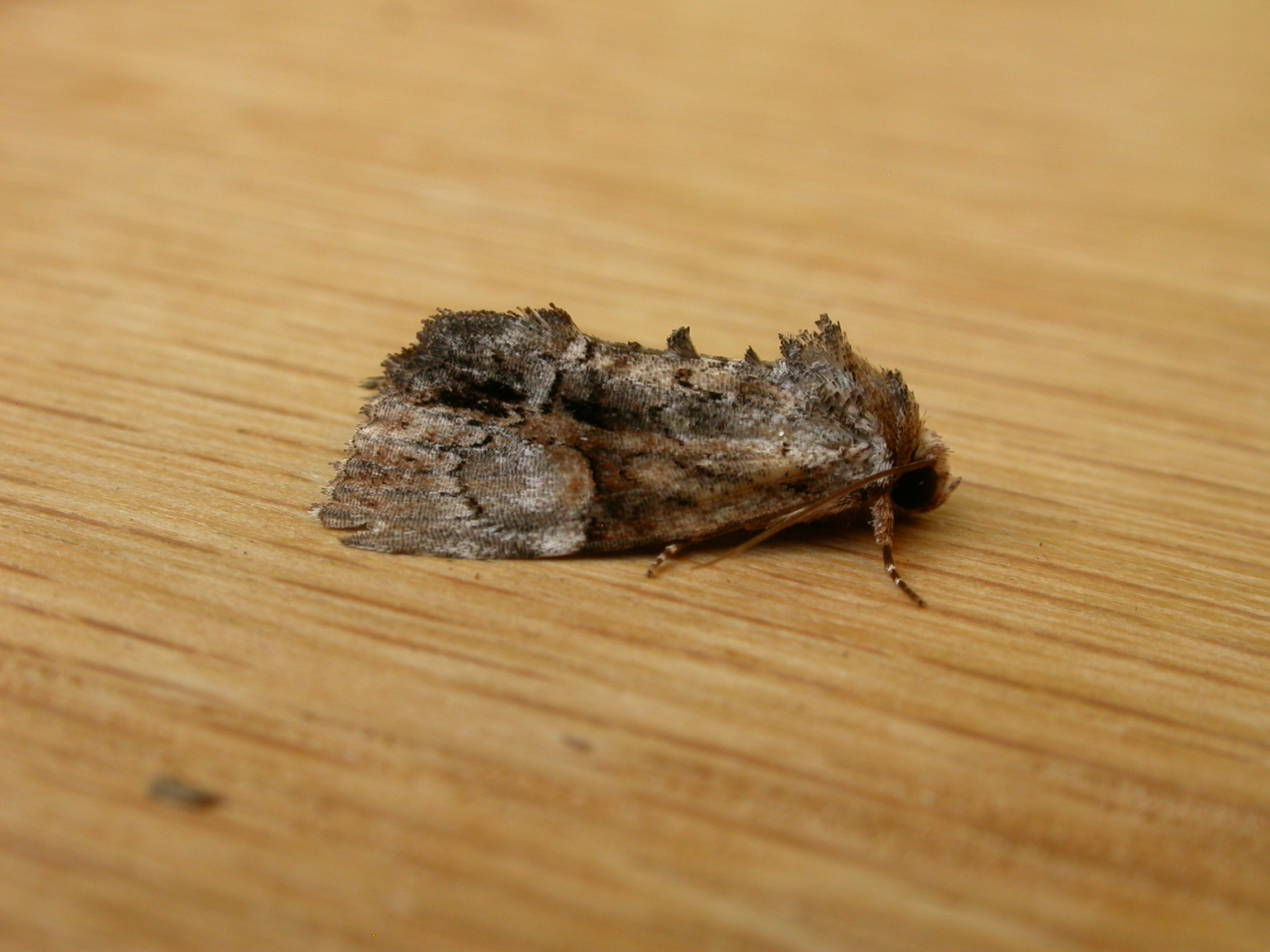

Scientific classification
- Domain: Eukaryota
- Kingdom: Animalia
- Phylum: Arthropoda
- Class: Insecta
- Order: Lepidoptera
- Superfamily: Noctuoidea
- Family: Erebidae
- Genus: Epicyrtica
- Species: E. leucostigma

Binomial name
- Epicyrtica leucostigma Turner, 1902

= Epicyrtica leucostigma =

Species of moth

Epicyrtica leucostigma is a moth of the family Erebidae first described by Alfred Jefferis Turner in 1902. It is found in Australia.
