= Erastroides =

Scientific classification
- Kingdom: Animalia
- Phylum: Arthropoda
- Class: Insecta
- Order: Lepidoptera
- Superfamily: Noctuoidea
- Family: Noctuidae
- Subfamily: Acontiinae
- Genus: Erastroides; Hampson, 1893

Genus of moths

Erastroides is a genus of moths of the family Noctuidae. The genus was erected by George Hampson in 1893.

== Description ==
It is similar to Erastria, but differs in the stalked veins 7, 8, 9, and 10, and absence of areole.

== Species ==
- Erastroides albiguttata Druce, 1909
- Erastroides curvifascia Hampson, 1891
- Erastroides emarginata Hampson, 1910
- Erastroides endomela Hampson, 1910
- Erastroides fausta Swinhoe, 1903
- Erastroides flavibasalis Hampson, 1897
- Erastroides hermosilla Schaus, 1904
- Erastroides javensis Warren, 1913
- Erastroides mesomela Hampson, 1910
- Erastroides molybdopasta Turner, 1908
- Erastroides oletta Schaus, 1904
- Erastroides oliviaria Hampson, 1893
- Erastroides propera Grote, 1882
