= Eremohadena roseonitens =

Scientific classification
- Kingdom: Animalia
- Phylum: Arthropoda
- Class: Insecta
- Order: Lepidoptera
- Superfamily: Noctuoidea
- Family: Noctuidae
- Subfamily: Noctuinae
- Genus: Eremohadena
- Species: E. roseonitens

Binomial name
- Eremohadena roseonitens (Oberthür, 1887)

Synonyms
- Mamestra roseonitens Oberthür, [1887]; Pseudohadena roseonitens; Pseudohadena rosenitens espugnensis Lajonquiére, 1964

Species of moth

Eremohadena roseonitens is a moth of the family Noctuidae, found in Malta and Spain. It was first described by Charles Oberthür in 1887.
