= Epidemas cinerea =

Scientific classification
- Domain: Eukaryota
- Kingdom: Animalia
- Phylum: Arthropoda
- Class: Insecta
- Order: Lepidoptera
- Superfamily: Noctuoidea
- Family: Noctuidae
- Tribe: Xylenini
- Subtribe: Xylenina
- Genus: Epidemas
- Species: E. cinerea

Binomial name
- Epidemas cinerea Smith, 1894

Species of moth

Epidemas cinerea is a species of cutworm or dart moth in the family Noctuidae. It is found in North America.

The MONA or Hodges number for Epidemas cinerea is 10002.
