= Ensipia =

Scientific classification
- Kingdom: Animalia
- Phylum: Arthropoda
- Class: Insecta
- Order: Lepidoptera
- Superfamily: Noctuoidea
- Family: Erebidae
- Subfamily: Calpinae
- Genus: Ensipia; Walker, 1859

Genus of moths

Ensipia is a genus of moths of the family Erebidae. The genus was erected by Francis Walker in 1859.

The Global Lepidoptera Names Index gives this name as a synonym of Hyamia Walker, 1859.

== Species ==
Based on Butterflies and Moths of the World and Encyclopedia of Life:

- Ensipia andaca
- Ensipia lamusalis Walker, 1859
- Ensipia pallens
- Ensipia trilineata
