= Epicyrtica =

Scientific classification
- Domain: Eukaryota
- Kingdom: Animalia
- Phylum: Arthropoda
- Class: Insecta
- Order: Lepidoptera
- Superfamily: Noctuoidea
- Family: Erebidae
- Subfamily: Calpinae
- Genus: Epicyrtica; Turner, 1908

Genus of moths

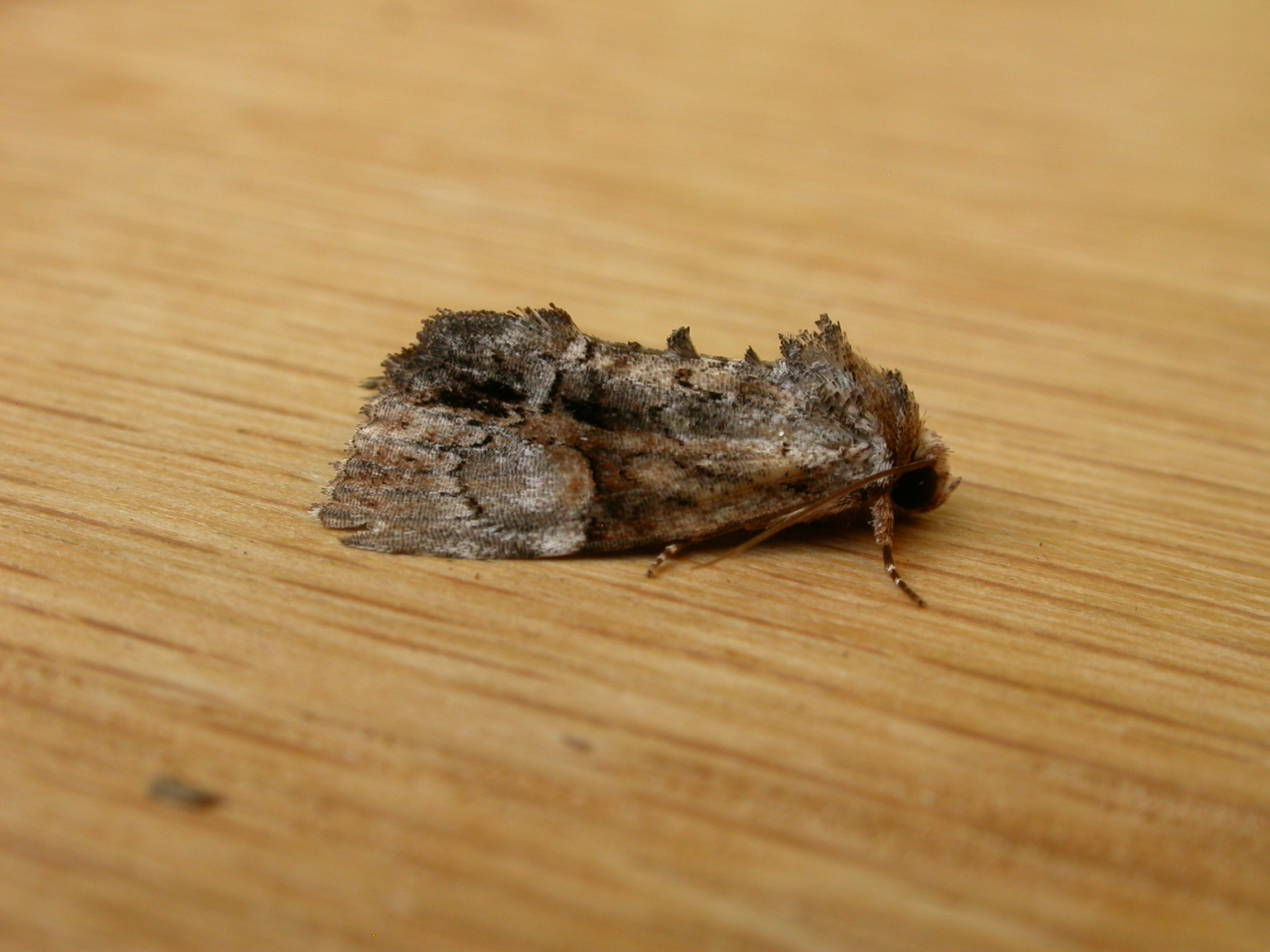
Epicyrtica leucostigma

Epicyrtica is a genus of moths of the family Noctuidae.

== Species ==
- Epicyrtica bryistis Turner, 1902
- Epicyrtica docima Turner, 1920
- Epicyrtica hippolopha Turner, 1936
- Epicyrtica lathridia Turner, 1908
- Epicyrtica leucostigma Turner, 1902
- Epicyrtica lichenophora Lower, 1902
- Epicyrtica melanops Lower, 1902
- Epicyrtica metallica Lucas, 1898
- Epicyrtica oostigma Turner, 1929
- Epicyrtica pamprepta Turner, 1922
