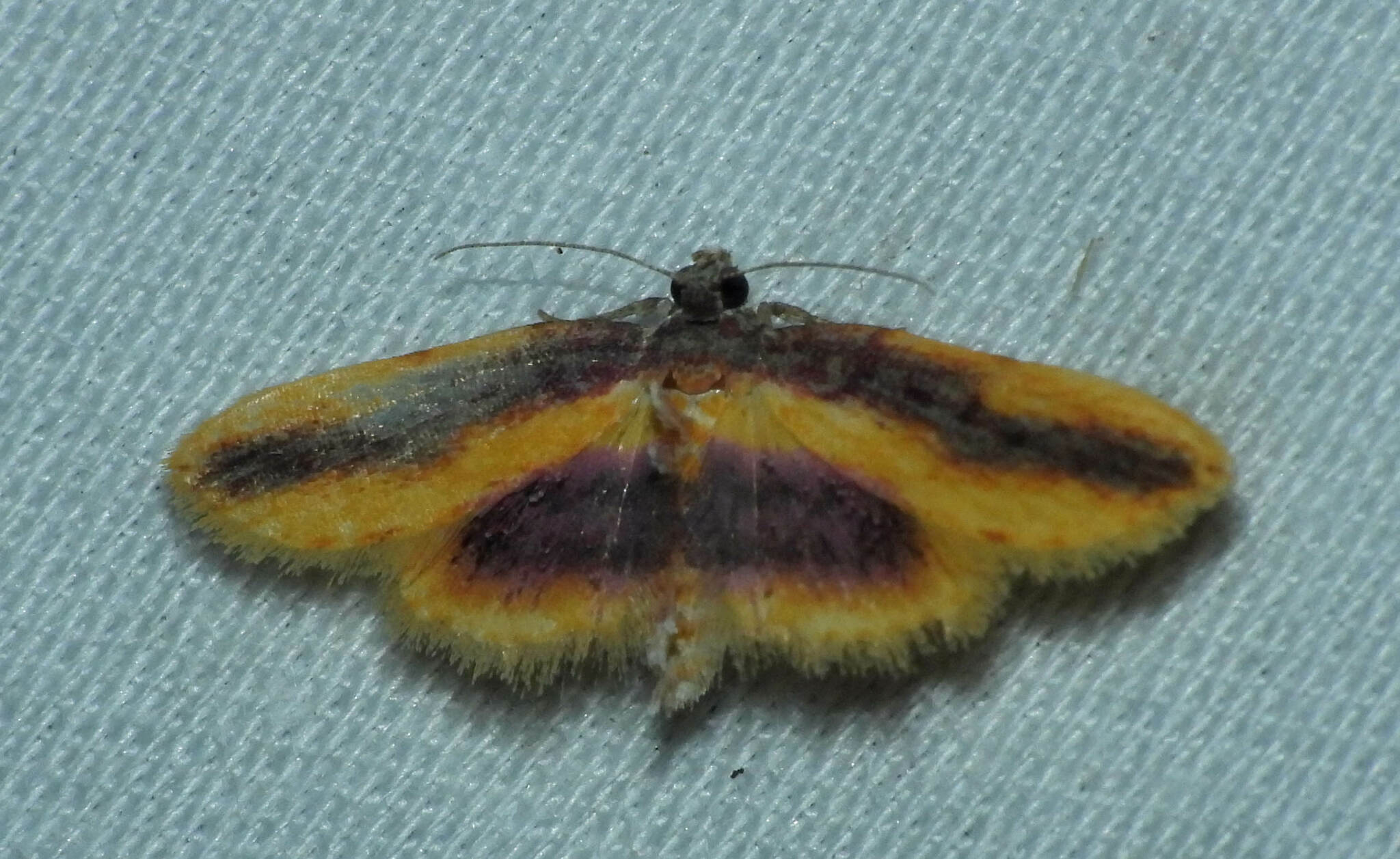
- Lycaugesia fuscifascia

Scientific classification
- Kingdom: Animalia
- Phylum: Arthropoda
- Clade: Pancrustacea
- Class: Insecta
- Order: Lepidoptera
- Superfamily: Noctuoidea
- Family: Noctuidae
- Subfamily: Acontiinae
- Genus: Lycaugesia; Dognin, 1910

= Lycaugesia =

Genus of moths

Lycaugesia is a genus of moths in the family Noctuidae. The genus was erected by Paul Dognin in 1910.

== Species ==
- Lycaugesia calochroia Dyar, 1914 Panama
- Lycaugesia epistigma Dyar, 1914 Panama
- Lycaugesia flavimargo Hampson, 1910 Brazil (Amazonas)
- Lycaugesia fuscicosta Hampson, 1910 Panama
- Lycaugesia fuscifascia Dognin, 1910 French Guiana
- Lycaugesia gratificula Dyar, 1914 Panama
- Lycaugesia hatita Schaus, 1911 Costa Rica
- Lycaugesia hemipennis Dyar, 1914 Panama
- Lycaugesia homogramma Schaus, 1915 Costa Rica
- Lycaugesia melasoma Hampson, 1910 Panama
- Lycaugesia microzale Dyar, 1914 Panama
- Lycaugesia monostella Dyar, 1914 Panama
- Lycaugesia perpurpura Dyar, 1914 Panama
- Lycaugesia postnigrescens Dyar, 1914 Panama
- Lycaugesia pseudura Dyar, 1914 Panama
- Lycaugesia punctilinea Hampson, 1910 Sri Lanka
- Lycaugesia rubribasis Hampson, 1918 Panama
- Lycaugesia rubripicta Hampson, 1910 Panama
- Lycaugesia rubripuncta Hampson, 1910 Sri Lanka
- Lycaugesia semiblanda Dyar, 1914 Panama
- Lycaugesia semiclara Dyar, 1914 Panama
- Lycaugesia stigmaleuca Dyar, 1914 Panama
- Lycaugesia teneralis (Walker, [1866]) Honduras
