= Erythroplusia =

Scientific classification
- Kingdom: Animalia
- Phylum: Arthropoda
- Class: Insecta
- Order: Lepidoptera
- Superfamily: Noctuoidea
- Family: Noctuidae
- Subfamily: Plusiinae
- Genus: Erythroplusia; Ichinose, 1962

Genus of moths

Erythroplusia is a genus of moths of the family Noctuidae.

== Species ==
- Erythroplusia pyropia Butler, 1879
- Erythroplusia rutilifrons Walker, 1858
