= Eusimara =

Scientific classification
- Kingdom: Animalia
- Phylum: Arthropoda
- Class: Insecta
- Order: Lepidoptera
- Superfamily: Noctuoidea
- Family: Erebidae
- Subfamily: Calpinae
- Genus: Eusimara; Walker, 1865
- Species: E. subfervida

Binomial name
- Eusimara subfervida Walker, 1865

Genus of moths

Eusimara is a monotypic moth genus of the family Erebidae. Its only species, Eusimara subfervida, is found in Colombia. Both the genus and the species were first described by Francis Walker in 1865.
