= Eccleta =

Scientific classification
- Domain: Eukaryota
- Kingdom: Animalia
- Phylum: Arthropoda
- Class: Insecta
- Order: Lepidoptera
- Superfamily: Noctuoidea
- Family: Noctuidae
- Genus: Eccleta; Turner, 1902

Genus of moths

Eccleta is a genus of moths of the family Noctuidae.

== Species ==
- Eccleta xuthophanes Turner, 1902
