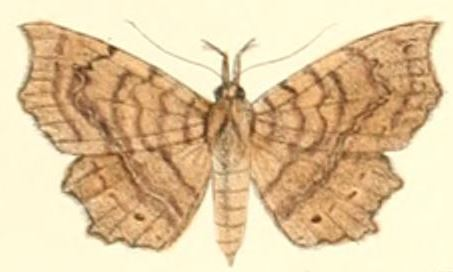
- Eutrogia morosa

Scientific classification
- Kingdom: Animalia
- Phylum: Arthropoda
- Class: Insecta
- Order: Lepidoptera
- Superfamily: Noctuoidea
- Family: Erebidae
- Subfamily: Calpinae
- Genus: Eutrogia; Hampson, 1926

= Eutrogia =

Genus of moths

Eutrogia is a genus of moths of the family Erebidae.

== Species ==
- Eutrogia castanea (Hampson, 1926)
- Eutrogia excisa (Hampson, 1898)
- Eutrogia morosa (Moore, 1882)
- Eutrogia ochreivena (Hampson, 1895)
