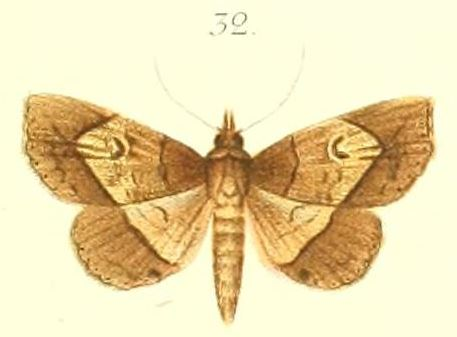
- Eugrapta angulata

Scientific classification
- Domain: Eukaryota
- Kingdom: Animalia
- Phylum: Arthropoda
- Class: Insecta
- Order: Lepidoptera
- Superfamily: Noctuoidea
- Family: Erebidae
- Subfamily: Calpinae
- Genus: Eugrapta; Wileman & South, 1917

Synonyms
- Eugrapta Hampson, 1926

= Eugrapta =

Genus of moths

Eugrapta is a genus of moths of the family Noctuidae.

== Species ==
- Eugrapta angulata (Pagenstecher, 1900)
- Eugrapta igniflua Wileman & South, 1917
- Eugrapta venusta (Hampson, 1898)
