= Epistrema =

Scientific classification
- Domain: Eukaryota
- Kingdom: Animalia
- Phylum: Arthropoda
- Class: Insecta
- Order: Lepidoptera
- Superfamily: Noctuoidea
- Family: Noctuidae
- Subfamily: Acontiinae
- Genus: Epistrema; Schaus, 1913

Genus of moths

Epistrema is a genus of moths of the family Noctuidae. The genus was described by William Schaus in 1913.

== Taxonomy ==
The Global Lepidoptera Names Index gives this name as a synonym of Eustrotia Hübner, [1821].

== Species ==
- Epistrema glaucosticta Schaus, 1916 Panama
- Epistrema ora Schaus, 1913 Costa Rica
- Epistrema sabularea (Schaus, 1906) Brazil (São Paulo)
