= Eutermina =

Scientific classification
- Kingdom: Animalia
- Phylum: Arthropoda
- Class: Insecta
- Order: Lepidoptera
- Superfamily: Noctuoidea
- Family: Erebidae
- Subfamily: Calpinae
- Genus: Eutermina; Hampson, 1926

Genus of moths

Eutermina is a genus of moths of the family Erebidae. The genus was erected by George Hampson in 1926.

== Species ==
- Eutermina apicirupta Carcasson, 1965
- Eutermina tenebrosa Holland, 1894
