= Epigrypera =

Scientific classification
- Kingdom: Animalia
- Phylum: Arthropoda
- Class: Insecta
- Order: Lepidoptera
- Superfamily: Noctuoidea
- Family: Noctuidae
- Subfamily: Acontiinae
- Genus: Epigrypera; Hampson, 1910

Genus of moths

Epigrypera is a genus of moths of the family Noctuidae. The genus was erected by George Hampson in 1910.

== Species ==
- Epigrypera argenticincta Hampson, 1910 Malaysia
- Epigrypera eriogona Hampson, 1910 Borneo
