= Epicerynea =

Scientific classification
- Kingdom: Animalia
- Phylum: Arthropoda
- Class: Insecta
- Order: Lepidoptera
- Superfamily: Noctuoidea
- Family: Noctuidae
- Subfamily: Acontiinae
- Genus: Epicerynea; Hampson, 1914

Genus of moths

Epicerynea is a genus of moths of the family Noctuidae. The genus was erected by George Hampson in 1914.

== Species ==
- Epicerynea elegans (Berio, 1959) Madagascar
- Epicerynea goniosema Hampson, 1914 Ghana, Uganda
- Epicerynea simillima Hacker, 2019 Nigeria, Gabon
