= Eupalindia =

Scientific classification
- Domain: Eukaryota
- Kingdom: Animalia
- Phylum: Arthropoda
- Class: Insecta
- Order: Lepidoptera
- Superfamily: Noctuoidea
- Family: Erebidae
- Subfamily: Calpinae
- Genus: Eupalindia; Schaus, 1904

Genus of moths

Eupalindia is a genus of moths of the family Erebidae. The genus was described by William Schaus in 1914.

== Species ==
- Eupalindia magnifica Schaus, 1904
- Eupalindia rubrescens Schaus, 1904
