= Epicausis =

Scientific classification
- Domain: Eukaryota
- Kingdom: Animalia
- Phylum: Arthropoda
- Class: Insecta
- Order: Lepidoptera
- Superfamily: Noctuoidea
- Family: Noctuidae
- Subfamily: Cuculliinae
- Genus: Epicausis; Butler, 1880

Genus of moths

Epicausis is a genus of moths of the family Noctuidae from Madagascar.

== Species ==
- Epicausis smithii (Mabille, 1880)
- Epicausis vaovao Viette, 1973
