= Ectoblemma =

Scientific classification
- Kingdom: Animalia
- Phylum: Arthropoda
- Clade: Pancrustacea
- Class: Insecta
- Order: Lepidoptera
- Superfamily: Noctuoidea
- Family: Noctuidae
- Subfamily: Acontiinae
- Genus: Ectoblemma; Sugi in Inoue, Sugi, Kuroko, Moriuti & Kawabe, 1982
- Species: E. rosella

Binomial name
- Ectoblemma rosella Sugi, 1982

Genus of moths

Ectoblemma is a monotypic moth genus of the family Noctuidae. Its only species, Ectoblemma rosella, is found in Japan. Both the genus and the species were first described by Shigero Sugi in 1982.
