= Eugoniella =

Scientific classification
- Domain: Eukaryota
- Kingdom: Animalia
- Phylum: Arthropoda
- Class: Insecta
- Order: Lepidoptera
- Superfamily: Noctuoidea
- Family: Erebidae
- Subfamily: Herminiinae
- Genus: Eugoniella; Kaye & Lamont, 1927
- Species: E. sapota

Binomial name
- Eugoniella sapota (Felder & Rogenhofer, 1874)

Genus of moths

Eugoniella is a monotypic moth genus of the family Noctuidae erected by William James Kaye and Norman Lamont in 1927. Its only species, Eugoniella sapota, was first described by Felder and Rogenhofer in 1874. It is found in French Guiana.
