= Epicarsia =

Scientific classification
- Kingdom: Animalia
- Phylum: Arthropoda
- Class: Insecta
- Order: Lepidoptera
- Superfamily: Noctuoidea
- Family: Erebidae
- Subfamily: Calpinae
- Genus: Epicarsia; Hampson, 1926

Genus of moths

Epicarsia is a genus of moths of the family Erebidae. The genus was erected by George Hampson in 1926.

== Species ==
- Epicarsia bigutta Walker, 1858
- Epicarsia diagramma Hampson, 1926
