= Encruphion =

Scientific classification
- Domain: Eukaryota
- Kingdom: Animalia
- Phylum: Arthropoda
- Class: Insecta
- Order: Lepidoptera
- Superfamily: Noctuoidea
- Family: Erebidae
- Subfamily: Calpinae
- Genus: Encruphion; Schaus, 1914

Genus of moths

Encruphion is a genus of moths of the family Erebidae. The genus was erected by William Schaus in 1914.

== Species ==
- Encruphion leena H. Druce, 1898
- Encruphion phalereus Schaus, 1914
- Encruphion porrima Schaus, 1914
- Encruphion sericina Hampson, 1926
- Encruphion xanthotricha Hampson, 1926
