= Eulepa =

Ancient Greek town in Cappadocia

Coordinates: 39°01′41″N 35°52′15″E

Eulepa (Εύλεπα) was an ancient Greek town in Cappadocia, inhabited in Hellenistic, Roman and Byzantine times.

The archaeological site is located near the village of Palas—formerly known as Gölova for a period—which today belongs to the Sarıoğlan district of Kayseri Province. The name "Palas" is believed to have evolved from the name of the town mentioned in episcopal lists since the 9th century: Aipolía > Aipolias > Epalas.
