= Epizeuxis (moth) =

Scientific classification
- Kingdom: Animalia
- Phylum: Arthropoda
- Clade: Pancrustacea
- Class: Insecta
- Order: Lepidoptera
- Superfamily: Noctuoidea
- Family: Erebidae
- Subfamily: Herminiinae
- Genus: Epizeuxis; Hübner, 1818

Genus of moths

Epizeuxis is a genus of moths of the family Noctuidae, it is considered to be a synonym of Idia by many authors, but some retain it as a valid genus. If treated as valid, it contains at least the type species Epizeuxis calvaria Denis & Schiffermüller, 1775.
