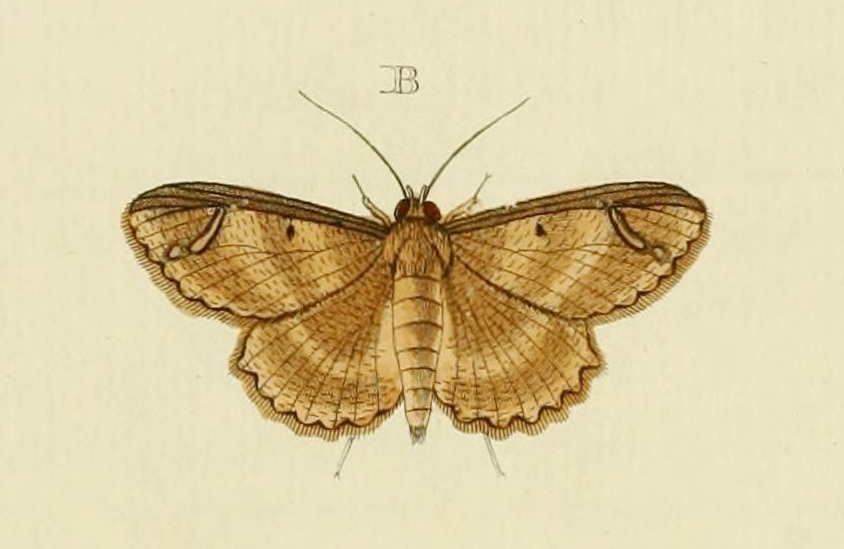
- Erebostrota stenelea

Scientific classification
- Domain: Eukaryota
- Kingdom: Animalia
- Phylum: Arthropoda
- Class: Insecta
- Order: Lepidoptera
- Superfamily: Noctuoidea
- Family: Erebidae
- Subfamily: Calpinae
- Genus: Erebostrota; Warren, 1889

Synonyms
- Emea Walker, 1865

= Erebostrota =

Genus of moths

Erebostrota is a genus of moths of the family Erebidae. The genus was described by Warren in 1899.

== Species ==
- Erebostrota albipicta Schaus, 1914
- Erebostrota amans Walker, 1858
- Erebostrota calais Schaus, 1914
- Erebostrota ochra Dognin, 1912
- Erebostrota stenelea Stoll, 1780
