= Eublemmistis =

Scientific classification
- Kingdom: Animalia
- Phylum: Arthropoda
- Class: Insecta
- Order: Lepidoptera
- Superfamily: Noctuoidea
- Family: Noctuidae
- Subfamily: Acontiinae
- Genus: Eublemmistis; Hampson, 1902

Genus of moths

Eublemmistis is a genus of moths of the family Noctuidae. The genus was erected by George Hampson in 1902.

== Species ==
- Eublemmistis aberfoylea Hacker, 2019 Zimbabwe
- Eublemmistis bivirgula Berio, 1963 Ghana, Liberia, Nigeria, Gabon, Uganda, Kenya,
- Eublemmistis chlorozonea Hampson, 1902 Ethiopia, Tanzania, Uganda, South Africa
- Eublemmistis elachistina Hacker, 2019 Liberia
- Eublemmistis gola Hacker, 2019 Liberia
- Eublemmistis ramonafana Hacker, Fiebig & Stadie, 2019 Madagascar
