= Eucosmocara =

Scientific classification
- Domain: Eukaryota
- Kingdom: Animalia
- Phylum: Arthropoda
- Class: Insecta
- Order: Lepidoptera
- Superfamily: Noctuoidea
- Family: Erebidae
- Subfamily: Hypeninae
- Genus: Eucosmocara; C. Swinhoe, 1901
- Species: E. plumifera

Binomial name
- Eucosmocara plumifera C. Swinhoe, 1901

Genus of moths

Eucosmocara is a monotypic moth genus of the family Erebidae. Its only species, Eucosmocara plumifera, is known from Borneo. Both the genus and the species were first described by Charles Swinhoe in 1901.
