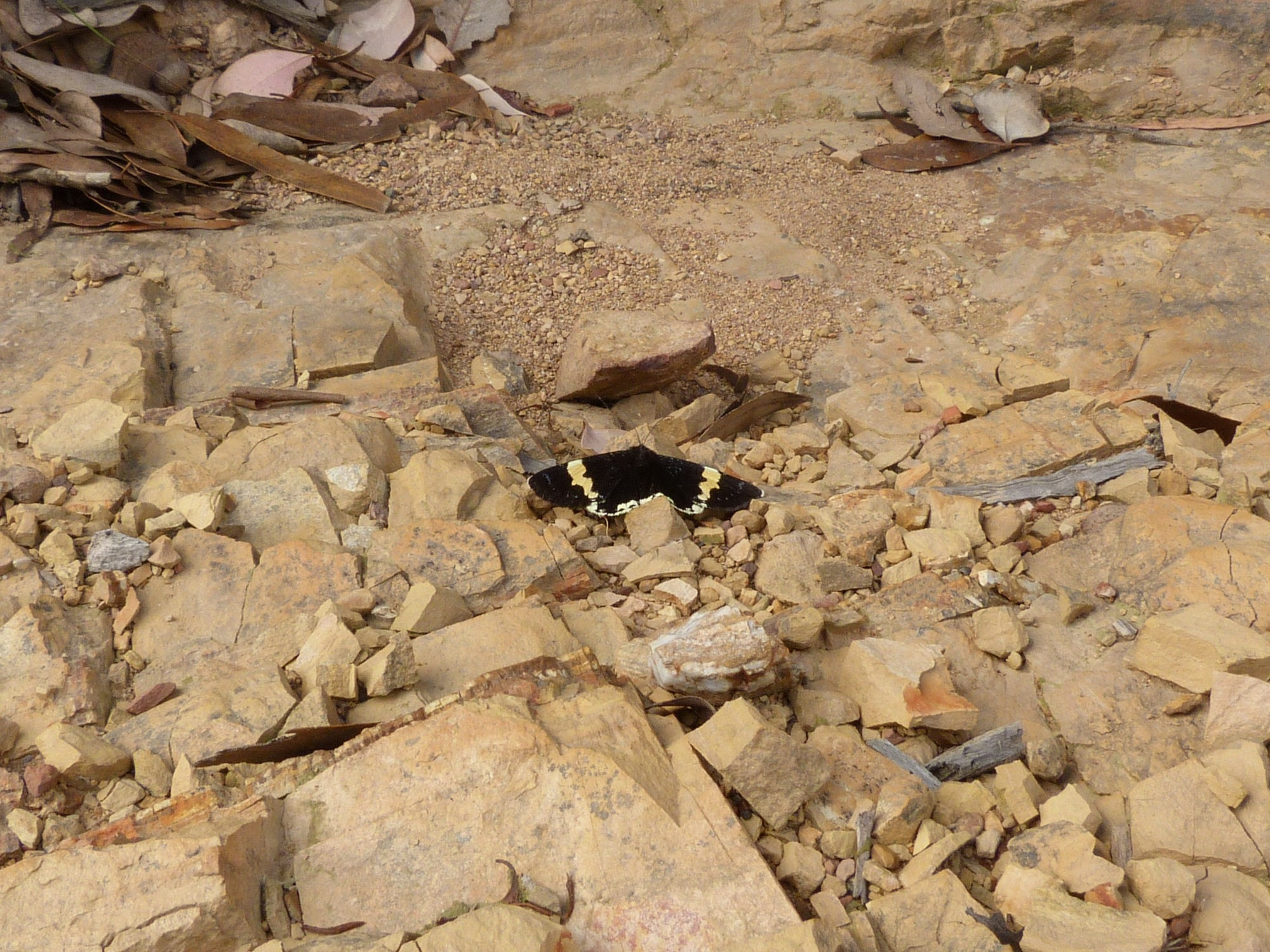
- In Black Mountain, Australia

Scientific classification
- Kingdom: Animalia
- Phylum: Arthropoda
- Class: Insecta
- Order: Lepidoptera
- Superfamily: Noctuoidea
- Family: Noctuidae
- Subfamily: Agaristinae
- Genus: Eutrichopidia; Hampson, 1901

= Eutrichopidia =

Genus of moths

Eutrichopidia is a genus of moths of the family Noctuidae. The genus was erected by George Hampson in 1901.

== Species ==
- Eutrichopidia latinus Donovan, 1805
- Eutrichopidia macchia Holloway, 1979
