= Epidemas =

- Epidemas melanographa

Scientific classification
- Kingdom: Animalia
- Phylum: Arthropoda
- Clade: Pancrustacea
- Class: Insecta
- Order: Lepidoptera
- Superfamily: Noctuoidea
- Family: Noctuidae
- Subtribe: Xylenina
- Genus: Epidemas; Hübner, 1821

Genus of moths

Epidemas is a genus of moths of the family Noctuidae.

== Species ==
- Epidemas cinerea Smith, 1894
- Epidemas obscurus Smith, 1903 (alternative spelling Epidemas obscura, syn: Epidemas melanographa Hampson, 1906)
Epidemas obscurus
