= Elegocampa =

Scientific classification
- Domain: Eukaryota
- Kingdom: Animalia
- Phylum: Arthropoda
- Class: Insecta
- Order: Lepidoptera
- Superfamily: Noctuoidea
- Family: Erebidae
- Subfamily: Calpinae
- Genus: Elegocampa; Franclemont, 1949
- Species: E. catharina

Binomial name
- Elegocampa catharina Schaus, 1933

Genus of moths

Elegocampa is a monotypic moth genus of the family Erebidae erected by John G. Franclemont in 1949. Its only species, Elegocampa catharina, was first described by William Schaus in 1933. It is found in Brazil.
