= Eremaula =

Scientific classification
- Domain: Eukaryota
- Kingdom: Animalia
- Phylum: Arthropoda
- Class: Insecta
- Order: Lepidoptera
- Superfamily: Noctuoidea
- Family: Noctuidae
- Genus: Eremaula; Turner, 1942

Genus of moths

Eremaula is a genus of moths of the family Noctuidae.

== Species ==
- Eremaula minor (Butler, 1886)
