= Eucalyptra =

Scientific classification
- Kingdom: Animalia
- Phylum: Arthropoda
- Class: Insecta
- Order: Lepidoptera
- Family: Heliodinidae
- Genus: Eucalyptra; Meyrick, 1921
- Species: E. picractis

Binomial name
- Eucalyptra picractis Meyrick, 1921

Genus of moths

Eucalyptra is a monotypic moth genus of the family Heliodinidae. Its only species, Eucalyptra picractis, is known from Java. Both the genus and the species were first described by Edward Meyrick in 1921.
