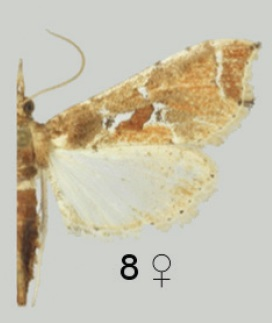

Scientific classification
- Kingdom: Animalia
- Phylum: Arthropoda
- Class: Insecta
- Order: Lepidoptera
- Superfamily: Noctuoidea
- Family: Erebidae
- Subfamily: Calpinae
- Genus: Hyamia; Walker, 1859

Synonyms
- Ensipia Walker, [1859]; Juncaria Walker, 1863

= Hyamia =

Genus of moths

Hyamia is a genus of moths of the family Erebidae. The genus was erected by Francis Walker in 1859.

== Species ==
- Hyamia anguliscripta Dognin, 1914
- Hyamia atlantica Herrich-Schäffer
- Hyamia dorsippa Walker
- Hyamia lamusalis Walker, 1858
- Hyamia nonagrioides Walker, 1863
- Hyamia palpitatalis Walker, 1858
- Hyamia subterminalis Walker, 1865
- Hyamia trilineata Schaus, 1914
- Hyamia unicolorata Kaye, 1901
