= Edyma =

Scientific classification
- Kingdom: Animalia
- Phylum: Arthropoda
- Class: Insecta
- Order: Lepidoptera
- Superfamily: Noctuoidea
- Family: Erebidae
- Subfamily: Calpinae
- Genus: Edyma; Walker, 1858
- Species: E. significans

Binomial name
- Edyma significans Walker, 1858

Genus of moths

Edyma is a monotypic moth genus of the family Erebidae. Its only species, Edyma significans, is found in Brazil. Both the genus and the species were first described by Francis Walker in 1858.
