= Eublarginea =

Scientific classification
- Domain: Eukaryota
- Kingdom: Animalia
- Phylum: Arthropoda
- Class: Insecta
- Order: Lepidoptera
- Superfamily: Noctuoidea
- Family: Noctuidae
- Subfamily: Acontiinae
- Genus: Eublarginea; Berio, 1966

Genus of moths

Eublarginea is a genus of moths of the family Noctuidae. The genus was erected by Emilio Berio in 1966.

== Species ==
- Eublarginea argentifera Berio, 1966 Madagascar
- Eublarginea niviceps Hacker & Saldaitis, 2019
