= Elaeodopsis =

Scientific classification
- Kingdom: Animalia
- Phylum: Arthropoda
- Clade: Pancrustacea
- Class: Insecta
- Order: Lepidoptera
- Superfamily: Noctuoidea
- Family: Noctuidae
- Genus: Elaeodopsis; Prout, 1927

Genus of moths

Elaeodopsis is a genus of moths of the family Noctuidae.

== Species ==
- Elaeodopsis girardi Laporte, 1972
- Elaeodopsis loxoscia Prout, 1927
- Elaeodopsis rougeoti (Laporte, 1970)
- Elaeodopsis turlini Laporte, 1978
