= Edmondsia =

Scientific classification
- Kingdom: Animalia
- Phylum: Arthropoda
- Class: Insecta
- Order: Lepidoptera
- Superfamily: Noctuoidea
- Family: Erebidae
- Genus: Edmondsia; Butler, 1882
- Species: E. sypnoides

Binomial name
- Edmondsia sypnoides Butler, 1882

Monotypic genus of moths

Edmondsia is a monotypic moth genus of the family Erebidae. Its only species, Edmondsia sypnoides, is found in Chile. Both the genus and the species were first described by Arthur Gardiner Butler in 1882.
