= Eustrotiopis =

Scientific classification
- Kingdom: Animalia
- Phylum: Arthropoda
- Class: Insecta
- Order: Lepidoptera
- Superfamily: Noctuoidea
- Family: Erebidae
- Subfamily: Calpinae
- Genus: Eustrotiopis; Hampson, 1926
- Species: E. chlorata

Binomial name
- Eustrotiopis chlorata Hampson, 1926

Synonyms
- Eustrotiopis richinii Berio, 1940

Genus of moths

Eustrotiopis is a monotypic moth genus of the family Erebidae. Its only species, Eustrotiopis chlorata, is found in the Democratic Republic of the Congo, Kenya, Tanzania and Uganda. Both the genus and the species were first described by George Hampson in 1926.
