= Eunimbatana =

Scientific classification
- Kingdom: Animalia
- Phylum: Arthropoda
- Class: Insecta
- Order: Lepidoptera
- Superfamily: Noctuoidea
- Family: Erebidae
- Subfamily: Calpinae
- Genus: Eunimbatana; D. S. Fletcher & Viette, 1955
- Species: E. lobata

Binomial name
- Eunimbatana lobata D. S. Fletcher & Viette, 1955

Genus of moths

Eunimbatana is a monotypic moth genus of the family Erebidae. Its only species, Eunimbatana lobata, is found in Guinea. Both the genus and the species were first described by David Stephen Fletcher and Pierre Viette in 1955.
