= Peperita =

Scientific classification
- Kingdom: Animalia
- Phylum: Arthropoda
- Class: Insecta
- Order: Lepidoptera
- Superfamily: Noctuoidea
- Family: Noctuidae
- Subfamily: Acontiinae
- Genus: Peperita; Hampson, 1910
- Species: P. molybdopasta

Binomial name
- Peperita molybdopasta (Turner, 1908)

Synonyms
- Erastroides molybdopasta Turner, 1908

Genus of moths

Peperita is a monotypic moth genus of the family Noctuidae erected by George Hampson in 1910. Its only species, Peperita molybdopasta, was first described by Turner in 1908. It is found in the Australian state of Queensland.
