= Eutelephia =

Scientific classification
- Kingdom: Animalia
- Phylum: Arthropoda
- Class: Insecta
- Order: Lepidoptera
- Superfamily: Noctuoidea
- Family: Erebidae
- Subfamily: Calpinae
- Genus: Eutelephia; Hampson, 1926
- Species: E. aureopicta

Binomial name
- Eutelephia aureopicta Kenrick, 1917

Synonyms
- Eutelia aureopicta Kenrick, 1917

Genus of moths

Eutelephia is a monotypic moth genus of the family Erebidae erected by George Hampson in 1926. Its only species, Eutelephia aureopicta, was first described by George Hamilton Kenrick in 1917. It is found on Madagascar.

It has a wingspan of about 30 mm. The forewings are bronze, with grey lines and chocolate blotches. the hindwings are whitish with a broad fuscous margin.
