= Echanella =

Scientific classification
- Domain: Eukaryota
- Kingdom: Animalia
- Phylum: Arthropoda
- Class: Insecta
- Order: Lepidoptera
- Superfamily: Noctuoidea
- Family: Erebidae
- Subfamily: Herminiinae
- Genus: Echanella; Bethune-Baker, 1908

Genus of moths

Echanella is a genus of moths of the family Noctuidae.

== Species ==
- Echanella albibasalis (Holland, 1900) (syn: Echanella purpurea Bethune-Baker, 1908, Echanella rugosa (Holland, 1900))
- Echanella funerea (Bethune-Baker, 1908)
- Echanella hirsutipennis Robinson, 1975
- Echanella obliquistriga A.E. Prout, 1928
- Echanella temperata A.E. Prout, 1928
