= Eurogramma =

Scientific classification
- Kingdom: Animalia
- Phylum: Arthropoda
- Class: Insecta
- Order: Lepidoptera
- Superfamily: Noctuoidea
- Family: Erebidae
- Subfamily: Calpinae
- Genus: Eurogramma; Hampson, 1926
- Species: E. obliquilineata

Binomial name
- Eurogramma obliquilineata Leech, 1900

Genus of moths

Eurogramma is a monotypic moth genus of the family Erebidae erected by George Hampson in 1926. Its only species, Eurogramma obliquilineata, was first described by John Henry Leech in 1900. It is found in China.
