= Euaethiops =

Scientific classification
- Domain: Eukaryota
- Kingdom: Animalia
- Phylum: Arthropoda
- Class: Insecta
- Order: Lepidoptera
- Superfamily: Noctuoidea
- Family: Erebidae
- Subfamily: Calpinae
- Genus: Euaethiops; Hampson, 1926

Genus of moths

Euaethiops is a genus of moths of the family Erebidae. The genus was erected by George Hampson in 1926.

== Species ==
- Euaethiops cyanopasta Hampson, 1926
- Euaethiops limbata Holland, 1894
