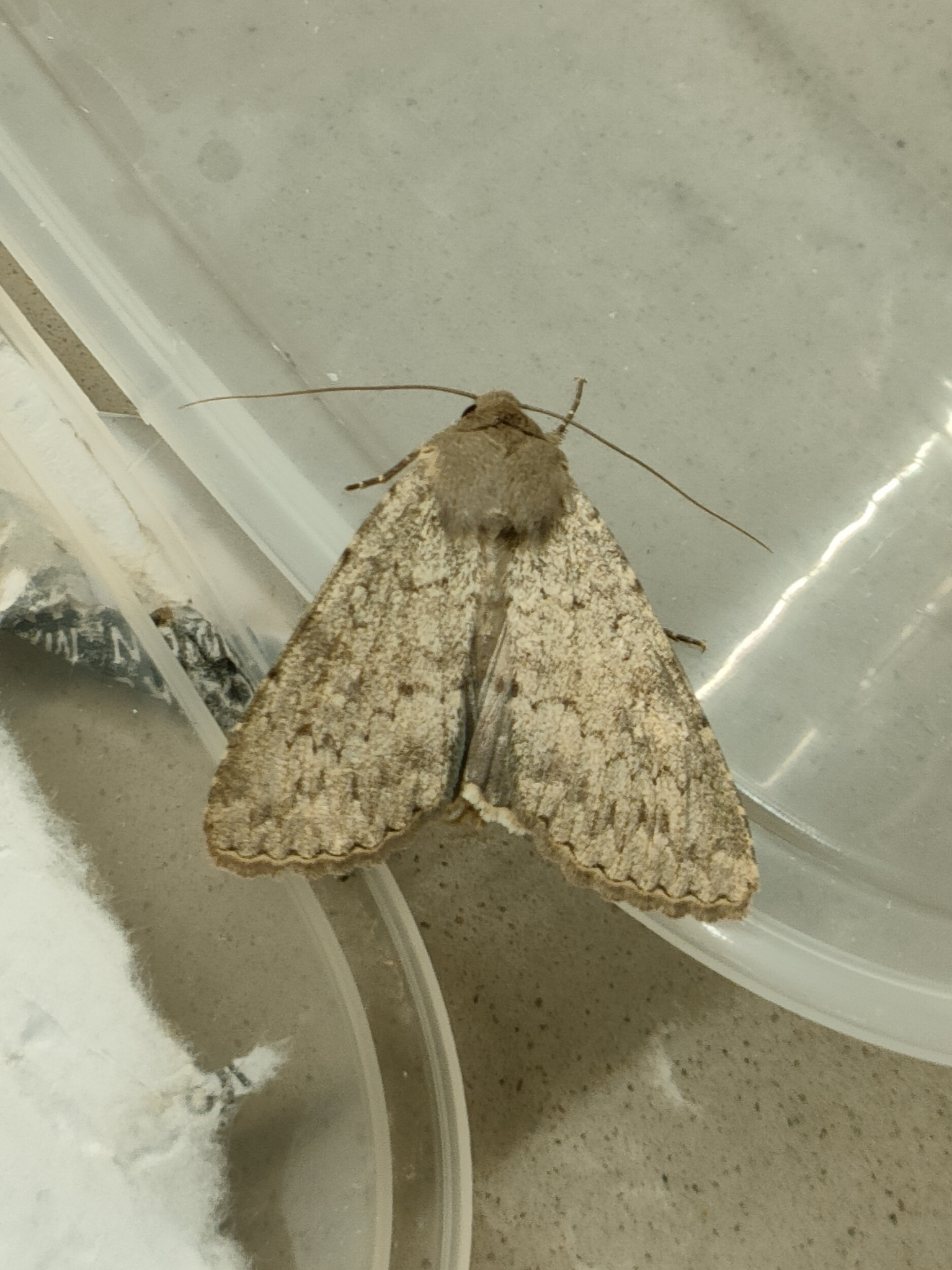
- Eremohadena halimi, Spain

Scientific classification
- Domain: Eukaryota
- Kingdom: Animalia
- Phylum: Arthropoda
- Class: Insecta
- Order: Lepidoptera
- Superfamily: Noctuoidea
- Family: Noctuidae
- Subfamily: Noctuinae
- Genus: Eremohadena; Ronkay, Varga & Fabian, 1995

= Eremohadena =

Genus of moths

Eremohadena is a genus of moths of the family Noctuidae.

== Species ==
- Eremohadena adscripta (Püngeler, 1914)
- Eremohadena catalampra Ronkay, Varga & Gyulai, 2002
- Eremohadena chenopodiphaga (Rambur, 1832)
- Eremohadena coluteae (Bienert, 1869)
- Eremohadena eibinevoi Fibiger, Kravchenko, Li, Mooser & Müller, 2006
- Eremohadena halimi (Milliére, 1877)
- Eremohadena immunda (Eversmann, 1842)
- Eremohadena immunis (Staudinger, 1889)
- Eremohadena mariana (Lajonquiére, 1964)
- Eremohadena megaptera (Boursin, 1970)
- Eremohadena ochronota Gyulai & Ronkay, 2001
- Eremohadena orias (Ronkay & Varga, 1993)
- Eremohadena oxybela (Boursin, 1963)
- Eremohadena pexa (Staudinger, 1889)
- Eremohadena pugnax (Alphéraky, 1892)
- Eremohadena raja Ronkay, Varga & Gyulai, 2002
- Eremohadena rjabovi (Boursin, 1970)
- Eremohadena roseonitens (Oberthür, 1887)
- Eremohadena roseotinctoides (Poole, 1989)
- Eremohadena siri (Erschoff, 1874)
- Eremohadena toerpexa Ronkay & Gyulai, 2006
