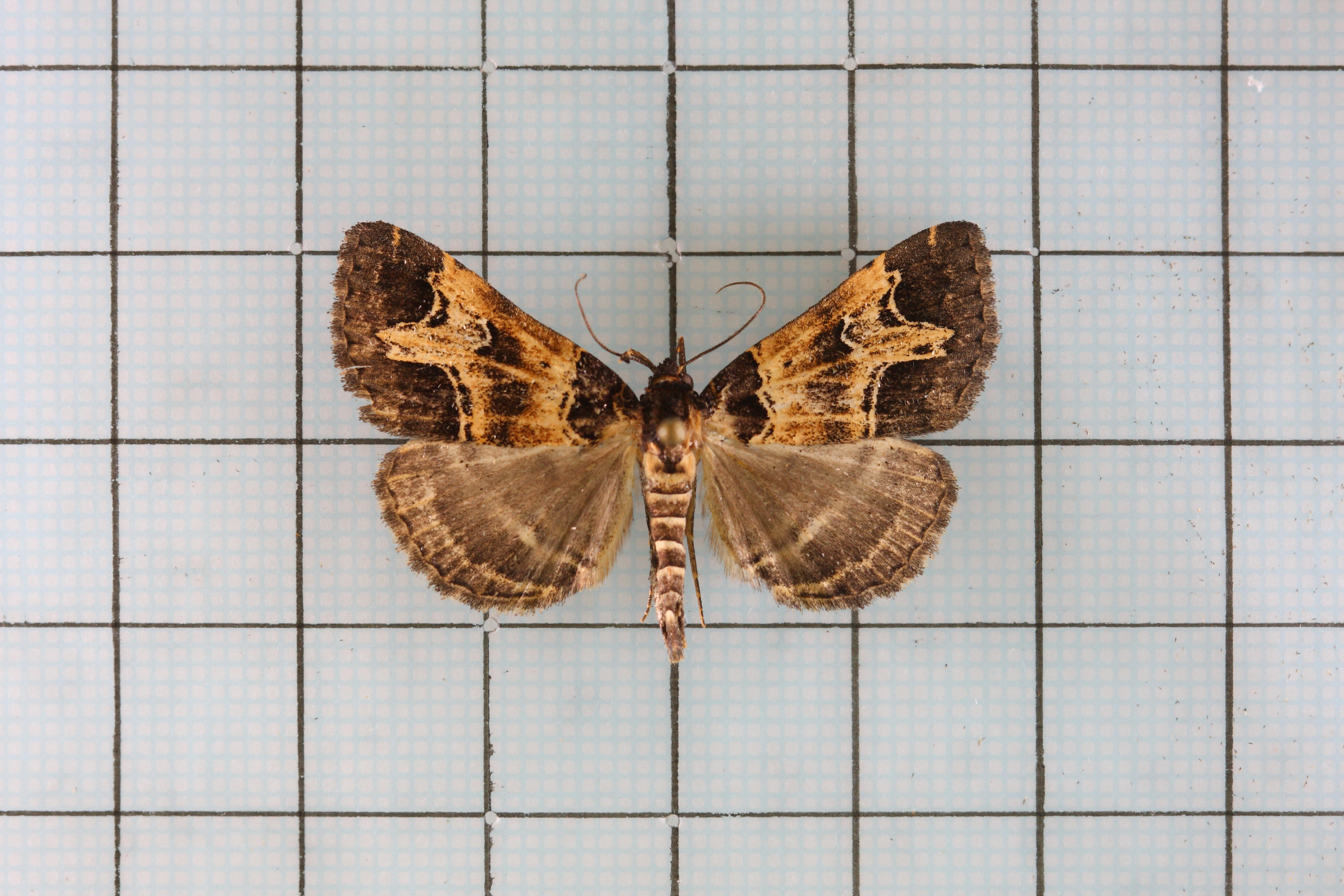

Scientific classification
- Domain: Eukaryota
- Kingdom: Animalia
- Phylum: Arthropoda
- Class: Insecta
- Order: Lepidoptera
- Superfamily: Noctuoidea
- Family: Erebidae
- Genus: Bertula
- Species: B. bidentata

Binomial name
- Bertula bidentata (Wileman, 1915)

Synonyms
- Bleptina bidentata Wileman, 1915

= Bertula bidentata =

Species of moth

Bertula bidentata is a moth of the family Noctuidae first described by Wileman in 1915. It is found in Taiwan.
