= Erastrifacies =

Scientific classification
- Kingdom: Animalia
- Phylum: Arthropoda
- Class: Insecta
- Order: Lepidoptera
- Superfamily: Noctuoidea
- Family: Erebidae
- Subfamily: Herminiinae
- Genus: Erastrifacies; Dyar, 1925
- Species: E. schedocala

Binomial name
- Erastrifacies schedocala Dyar, 1925

Genus of moths

Erastrifacies is a monotypic moth genus of the family Noctuidae. Its only species, Erastrifacies schedocala, is known from Mexico. Both the genus and the species were first described by Harrison Gray Dyar Jr. in 1925.
