= Emariannia =

Scientific classification
- Domain: Eukaryota
- Kingdom: Animalia
- Phylum: Arthropoda
- Class: Insecta
- Order: Lepidoptera
- Superfamily: Noctuoidea
- Family: Noctuidae
- Subfamily: Cuculliinae
- Genus: Emariannia; Benjamin, 1933

Genus of moths

Emariannia is a genus of moths of the family Noctuidae.

== Species ==
- Emariannia cucullidea Benjamin, 1933
