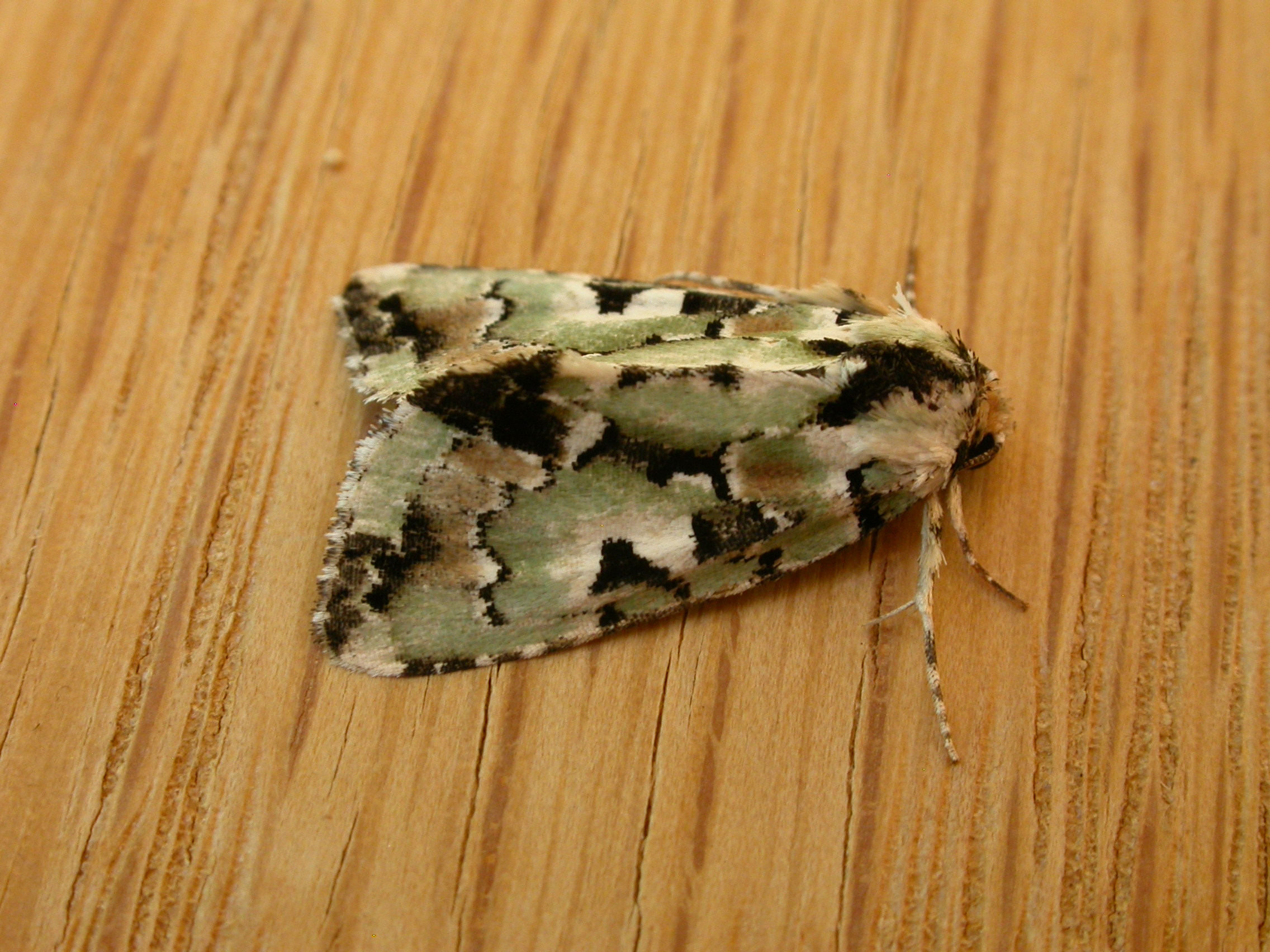

Scientific classification
- Domain: Eukaryota
- Kingdom: Animalia
- Phylum: Arthropoda
- Class: Insecta
- Order: Lepidoptera
- Superfamily: Noctuoidea
- Family: Erebidae
- Genus: Epicyrtica
- Species: E. metallica

Binomial name
- Epicyrtica metallica T. P. Lucas, 1898

= Epicyrtica metallica =

Species of moth

Epicyrtica metallica is a moth of the family Erebidae first described by Thomas Pennington Lucas in 1898. It is found in Australia.
