= Eviridemas =

Scientific classification
- Domain: Eukaryota
- Kingdom: Animalia
- Phylum: Arthropoda
- Class: Insecta
- Order: Lepidoptera
- Superfamily: Noctuoidea
- Family: Noctuidae
- Subfamily: Bryophilinae
- Genus: Eviridemas; Barnes & Benjamin, 1929
- Species: E. minuta

Binomial name
- Eviridemas minuta (Barnes & McDunnough, 1910)

Genus of moths

Eviridemas is a monotypic moth genus of the family Noctuidae erected by William Barnes and Foster Hendrickson Benjamin in 1929. Its only species, Eviridemas minuta, was first described by Barnes and James Halliday McDunnough in 1910.
