= Ectogonia =

Scientific classification
- Kingdom: Animalia
- Phylum: Arthropoda
- Class: Insecta
- Order: Lepidoptera
- Superfamily: Noctuoidea
- Family: Erebidae
- Subfamily: Calpinae
- Genus: Ectogonia; Hampson, 1896

Synonyms
- Camptochilus Hampson, 1895

Genus of moths

Ectogonia is a genus of moths of the family Erebidae. The genus was erected by George Hampson in 1896.

== Species ==
- Ectogonia albomaculalis Bremer, 1864
- Ectogonia butleri Leech, 1900
- Ectogonia curvipalpata Holloway, 2005
- Ectogonia fumosa Hampson, 1926
- Ectogonia viola Hampson, 1895
