= Eccrita =

Scientific classification
- Domain: Eukaryota
- Kingdom: Animalia
- Phylum: Arthropoda
- Class: Insecta
- Order: Lepidoptera
- Superfamily: Noctuoidea
- Family: Erebidae
- Subfamily: Calpinae
- Genus: Eccrita; Lederer, 1857

Genus of moths

Eccrita is a genus of moths of the family Noctuidae and is in the subfamily of Calpinae. The genus was erected by Julius Lederer in 1857. The genus was considered a synonym of Lygephila by Robert W. Poole, but it was revalidated by Herbert Beck in 1996.

If treated as a valid genus, it contains the species Eccrita ludicra Hübner, 1790, but many authors place it in Lygephila as Lygephila ludicra.
