= Eremobastis =

Scientific classification
- Kingdom: Animalia
- Phylum: Arthropoda
- Class: Insecta
- Order: Lepidoptera
- Superfamily: Noctuoidea
- Family: Noctuidae
- Genus: Eremobastis; Perez-Lopez & Morente-Benitez, 1996

Genus of moths

Eremobastis is a genus of moths of the family Noctuidae.

== Species ==
- Eremobastis fulva (Rothschild, 1914)
