= Elecussa =

Scientific classification
- Domain: Eukaryota
- Kingdom: Animalia
- Phylum: Arthropoda
- Class: Insecta
- Order: Lepidoptera
- Superfamily: Noctuoidea
- Family: Erebidae
- Subfamily: Calpinae
- Genus: Elecussa; Schaus, 1912
- Species: E. displosa

Binomial name
- Elecussa displosa Schaus, 1912

Genus of moths

Elecussa is a monotypic moth genus of the family Erebidae. Its only species, Elecussa displosa, is found in Costa Rica. Both the genus and the species were first described by William Schaus in 1912.
