= Epimecia =

Scientific classification
- Kingdom: Animalia
- Phylum: Arthropoda
- Class: Insecta
- Order: Lepidoptera
- Superfamily: Noctuoidea
- Family: Noctuidae
- Genus: Epimecia; Guenée, 1839

Genus of moths

Epimecia is a genus of moths of the family Noctuidae.

== Species ==
- Epimecia ustula (Freyer, 1835)
