= Eromidia =

Scientific classification
- Domain: Eukaryota
- Kingdom: Animalia
- Phylum: Arthropoda
- Class: Insecta
- Order: Lepidoptera
- Superfamily: Noctuoidea
- Family: Erebidae
- Subfamily: Calpinae
- Genus: Eromidia; Schaus, 1914
- Species: E. clotho

Binomial name
- Eromidia clotho Schaus, 1914

Genus of insects

Eromidia is a monotypic moth genus of the family Erebidae. Its only species, Eromidia clotho, is found in French Guiana. Both the genus and the species were first described by William Schaus in 1914.
