= Erebothrix =

Scientific classification
- Domain: Eukaryota
- Kingdom: Animalia
- Phylum: Arthropoda
- Class: Insecta
- Order: Lepidoptera
- Superfamily: Noctuoidea
- Family: Erebidae
- Subfamily: Calpinae
- Genus: Erebothrix; Warren, 1889
- Species: E. semiusta

Binomial name
- Erebothrix semiusta Warren, 1889

Genus of moths

Erebothrix is a monotypic moth genus of the family Erebidae. Its only species, Erebothrix semiusta, is found in Brazil. Both the genus and the species were first described by Warren in 1889.
