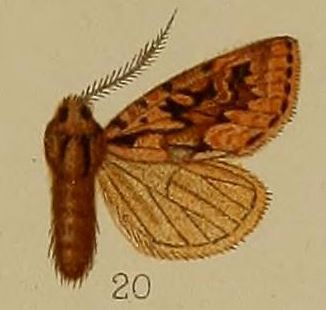
- Estimata clavata

Scientific classification
- Domain: Eukaryota
- Kingdom: Animalia
- Phylum: Arthropoda
- Class: Insecta
- Order: Lepidoptera
- Superfamily: Noctuoidea
- Family: Noctuidae
- Subfamily: Noctuinae
- Genus: Estimata; Kozhanchikov, 1928

Synonyms
- Estimaja Kozhanchikov, 1937 (unjustified emendation)

= Estimata =

Genus of moths

Estimata is a genus of moths of the family Noctuidae.

== Species ==
- Estimata alexis Kozhantschikov, 1928
- Estimata cacumena (Brandt, 1938)
- Estimata clavata (Hampson, 1907)
- Estimata dailingensis Chen, 1984
- Estimata dhaulagirii Dierl, 1983
- Estimata eversti Dierl, 1983
- Estimata herrichschaefferi (Alpheraky, 1895)
- Estimata herzioides (Corti & Draudt, 1933)
- Estimata magadanica Kononenko, 1981
- Estimata militzae (Kozhantschikov, 1937)
- Estimata oschi (Kozhantschikov, 1937)
- Estimata parvula (Alpheraky, 1897)
- Estimata takkhalii Dierl, 1983
- Estimata tibetophasma Boursin, 1963
