= Enedena =

Scientific classification
- Domain: Eukaryota
- Kingdom: Animalia
- Phylum: Arthropoda
- Class: Insecta
- Order: Lepidoptera
- Superfamily: Noctuoidea
- Family: Erebidae
- Subfamily: Herminiinae
- Genus: Enedena; Dognin, 1914
- Species: E. punctilinea

Binomial name
- Enedena punctilinea Dognin, 1914

Genus of moths

Enedena is a monotypic moth genus of the family Erebidae. Its only species, Enedena punctilinea, is found in Ecuador. Both the genus and species were first described by Paul Dognin in 1914.
