= Ecbolemia =

Scientific classification
- Kingdom: Animalia
- Phylum: Arthropoda
- Class: Insecta
- Order: Lepidoptera
- Superfamily: Noctuoidea
- Family: Noctuidae
- Subfamily: Hadeninae
- Genus: Ecbolemia; Hampson, 1908

Genus of moths

Ecbolemia was a genus of moths of the family Noctuidae. It is now considered a synonym of Scythocentropus. It contained four species, which are all transferred to other genera or placed in synonymity.

== Former species ==
- Ecbolemia daghestana Boursin, 1944 is a synonym of Scythocentropus misella (Püngeler, 1908)
- Ecbolemia misella Püngeler, 1907 is now Scythocentropus misella (Püngeler, 1908)
- Ecbolemia parca Sukhareva, 1976 is a synonym of Polymixis colluta (Draudt, 1934)
- Ecbolemia singalesia Hampson, 1918 is now Scythocentropus singalesia (Hampson, 1918)
