= Eusimplex =

Scientific classification
- Kingdom: Animalia
- Phylum: Arthropoda
- Clade: Pancrustacea
- Class: Insecta
- Order: Lepidoptera
- Superfamily: Noctuoidea
- Family: Noctuidae
- Subfamily: Acontiinae
- Genus: Eusimplex; Berio, 1977

Genus of moths

Eusimplex is a genus of moths of the family Noctuidae. The genus was erected by Emilio Berio in 1977. Both species are found in Zaire.

== Species ==
- Eusimplex flava Berio, 1977
- Eusimplex perflava Berio, 1977
