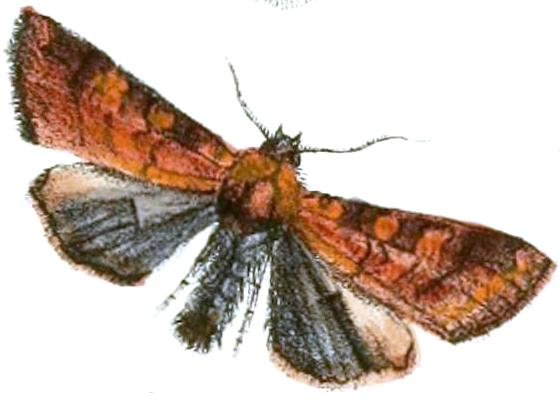
- Estagrotis cuprea

Scientific classification
- Domain: Eukaryota
- Kingdom: Animalia
- Phylum: Arthropoda
- Class: Insecta
- Order: Lepidoptera
- Superfamily: Noctuoidea
- Family: Noctuidae
- Subfamily: Noctuinae
- Genus: Estagrotis; Nye, 1975

Synonyms
- Setagrotis Warren, 1912

= Estagrotis =

Genus of moths

Estagrotis is a genus of moths of the family Noctuidae.

== Species ==
- Estagrotis canescens Hacker & Ronkay, 1992
- Estagrotis cuprea (Moore, 1867)
- Estagrotis plantei Hacker & Ronkay, 1992
- Estagrotis rufalis (Bethune-Baker, 1906)
