= Erastriopis =

Scientific classification
- Kingdom: Animalia
- Phylum: Arthropoda
- Class: Insecta
- Order: Lepidoptera
- Superfamily: Noctuoidea
- Family: Erebidae
- Subfamily: Calpinae
- Genus: Erastriopis; Hampson, 1926

Genus of moths

Erastriopis is a genus of moths of the family Erebidae. The genus was erected by George Hampson in 1926.

== Species ==
- Erastriopis anaemica Hampson, 1926
- Erastriopis atrirena de Joannis, 1929
- Erastriopis costiplaga Rothschild, 1916
- Erastriopis lativitta Moore, 1883
