= Eucocytia =

Scientific classification
- Domain: Eukaryota
- Kingdom: Animalia
- Phylum: Arthropoda
- Class: Insecta
- Order: Lepidoptera
- Superfamily: Noctuoidea
- Family: Noctuidae
- Genus: Eucocytia

Genus of moths

Eucocytia is a genus of moths of the family Noctuidae. It is the only genus in subfamily Eucocytiinae.

== Selected species ==
- Eucocytia meeki Rothschild & Jordan, 1905
