= Eutheiaplusia =

Scientific classification
- Domain: Eukaryota
- Kingdom: Animalia
- Phylum: Arthropoda
- Class: Insecta
- Order: Lepidoptera
- Superfamily: Noctuoidea
- Family: Noctuidae
- Subfamily: Plusiinae
- Genus: Eutheiaplusia

Genus of moths

Eutheiaplusia is a genus of moths of the family Noctuidae.
