= Edessena =

Scientific classification
- Kingdom: Animalia
- Phylum: Arthropoda
- Class: Insecta
- Order: Lepidoptera
- Superfamily: Noctuoidea
- Family: Erebidae
- Subfamily: Herminiinae
- Genus: Edessena; Walker, [1859]

Genus of moths

Edessena is a genus of moths of the family Erebidae. The genus was erected by Francis Walker in 1859.

== Species ==
- Edessena gentiusalis Walker, [1859] Taiwan, Japan, China
- Edessena hamada (Felder & Rogenhofer, 1874) Japan, Korea, China
