= Eudrapa =

Scientific classification
- Kingdom: Animalia
- Phylum: Arthropoda
- Class: Insecta
- Order: Lepidoptera
- Superfamily: Noctuoidea
- Family: Erebidae
- Subfamily: Calpinae
- Genus: Eudrapa; Walker, 1858

Synonyms
- Piala Walker, 1858

Genus of moths

Eudrapa is a genus of moths of the family Noctuidae. The genus was erected by Francis Walker in 1858.

== Species ==
- Eudrapa basipunctum Walker, 1858
- Eudrapa fontainei Berio, 1956
- Eudrapa grisea Pinhey, 1968
- Eudrapa lepraota Hampson, 1926
- Eudrapa maculata Berio, 1956
- Eudrapa metathermeola Hampson, 1926
- Eudrapa mollis Walker, 1857
- Eudrapa olivaria Hampson, 1926
- Eudrapa sogai Viette, 1965
