= Euippodes =

Scientific classification
- Kingdom: Animalia
- Phylum: Arthropoda
- Class: Insecta
- Order: Lepidoptera
- Superfamily: Noctuoidea
- Family: Erebidae
- Subfamily: Calpinae
- Genus: Euippodes; Hampson, 1926

Genus of moths

Euippodes is a genus of moths of the family Erebidae. The genus was erected by George Hampson in 1926.

== Species ==
- Euippodes diversa Berio, 1956
- Euippodes euprepes Hampson, 1926
- Euippodes ituriensis Gaede, 1940
- Euippodes perundulata Berio, 1956
