= Epiconcana =

Scientific classification
- Kingdom: Animalia
- Phylum: Arthropoda
- Class: Insecta
- Order: Lepidoptera
- Superfamily: Noctuoidea
- Family: Erebidae
- Subfamily: Calpinae
- Genus: Epiconcana; Hampson, 1926

Genus of moths

Epiconcana is a genus of moths of the family Erebidae. The genus was erected by George Hampson in 1926.

== Species ==
- Epiconcana polyleuca Hampson, 1926
- Epiconcana leucomera Dyar, 1912
