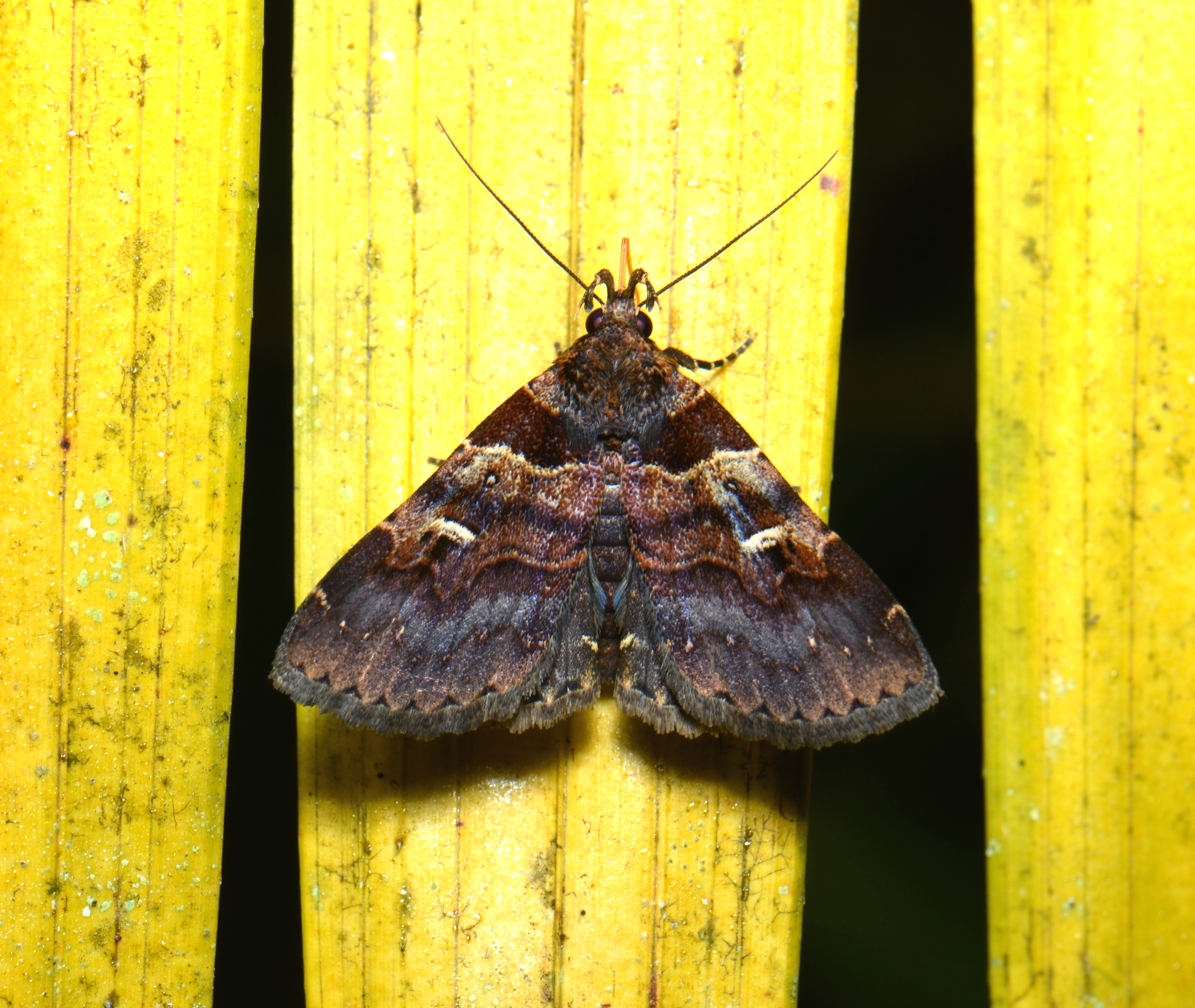

Scientific classification
- Kingdom: Animalia
- Phylum: Arthropoda
- Class: Insecta
- Order: Lepidoptera
- Superfamily: Noctuoidea
- Family: Erebidae
- Subfamily: Herminiinae
- Genus: Bertula; Walker, 1859

Synonyms
- Neviasca Walker, [1859]; Cardalena Walker, [1859]; Elyra Walker, [1859]; Eordaea Walker, 1859; Gabrisa Walker, 1866

= Bertula =

Genus of moths

Bertula is a genus of moths of the family Erebidae. The genus was erected by Francis Walker in 1859.

== Species ==
- Bertula abjudicalis Walker 1859
- Bertula albipunctata Wileman 1915
- Bertula alpheusalis Walker 1859
- Bertula atrirena Hampson 1929
- Bertula bidentata (Wileman 1915)
- Bertula bistrigata (Staudinger 1888)
- Bertula carta (Swinhoe 1902)
- Bertula centralis (Wileman 1915)
- Bertula contingens Walker 1859
- Bertula dentilinea (Hampson 1895)
- Bertula depressalis (Snellen 1886)
- Bertula erectilinea (Swinhoe 1902)
- Bertula excelsalis Walker 1862
- Bertula figurata (Hampson 1898)
- Bertula fulvistrigalis Warren 1912
- Bertula grimsgaardi (Strand 1919)
- Bertula hadenalis (Moore 1867)
- Bertula heteropalpia (Hampson 1912)
- Bertula hisbonalis Walker 1859
- Bertula imparatalis Walker 1866
- Bertula impuralis (Hampson 1898)
- Bertula incisa (Wileman 1915)
- Bertula inconspicua (Swinhoe 1902)
- Bertula insignifica Rothschild 1920
- Bertula kosemponica (Strand 1917)
- Bertula latifasciata (Hampson 1895)
- Bertula madida (Swinhoe 1904)
- Bertula mimica (Hampson 1898)
- Bertula nigra Swinhoe 1902
- Bertula partita Hampson 1891
- Bertula persimilis (Wileman 1915)
- Bertula phidiasalis Walker 1859
- Bertula prunosa (Moore 1885)
- Bertula restricta (Moore 1882)
- Bertula rostrilinea Prout 1928
- Bertula saigonensis Lemee 1950
- Bertula sinuosa (Leech 1900)
- Bertula spacoalis (Walker 1859)
- Bertula suisharyonis (Strand 1920)
- Bertula syrichtusalis Walker 1859
- Bertula terminalis (Wileman 1915)
- Bertula tespisalis (Walker 1859)
- Bertula vialis (Moore 1882)
