= Eumichtochroa =

Scientific classification
- Kingdom: Animalia
- Phylum: Arthropoda
- Class: Insecta
- Order: Lepidoptera
- Superfamily: Noctuoidea
- Family: Erebidae
- Subfamily: Calpinae
- Genus: Eumichtochroa; Hampson, 1926
- Species: E. dudgeoni

Binomial name
- Eumichtochroa dudgeoni Hampson, 1896

Genus of moths

Eumichtochroa is a monotypic moth genus of the family Erebidae. Its only species, Eumichtochroa dudgeoni, is found in Bhutan. Both the genus and the species were first described by George Hampson, the genus in 1926 and the species thirty years earlier in 1896.
