= Eugrammodes =

Scientific classification
- Kingdom: Animalia
- Phylum: Arthropoda
- Class: Insecta
- Order: Lepidoptera
- Superfamily: Noctuoidea
- Family: Erebidae
- Subfamily: Calpinae
- Genus: Eugrammodes; Hampson, 1926
- Species: E. esquina

Binomial name
- Eugrammodes esquina Dognin, 1897

Genus of moths

Eugrammodes is a monotypic moth genus of the family Erebidae erected by George Hampson in 1926. Its only species, Eugrammodes esquina, was first described by Paul Dognin in 1897. It is found in Ecuador.
