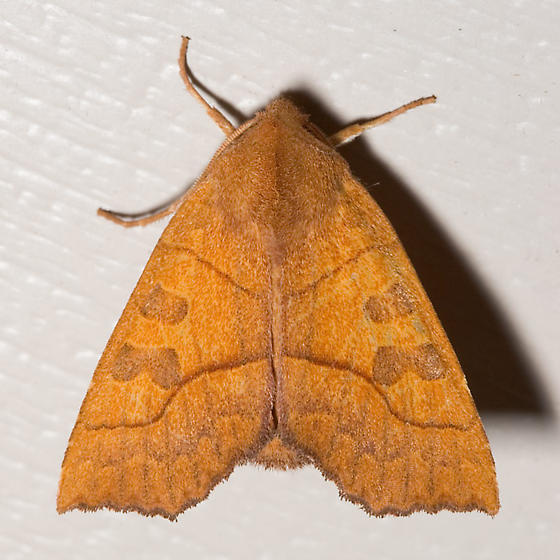
- Eucirroedia pampina

Scientific classification
- Kingdom: Animalia
- Phylum: Arthropoda
- Class: Insecta
- Order: Lepidoptera
- Superfamily: Noctuoidea
- Family: Noctuidae
- Subfamily: Cuculliinae
- Genus: Eucirroedia; Grote, 1875

= Eucirroedia =

Genus of moths

Eucirroedia is a genus of moths of the family Noctuidae.

== Species ==
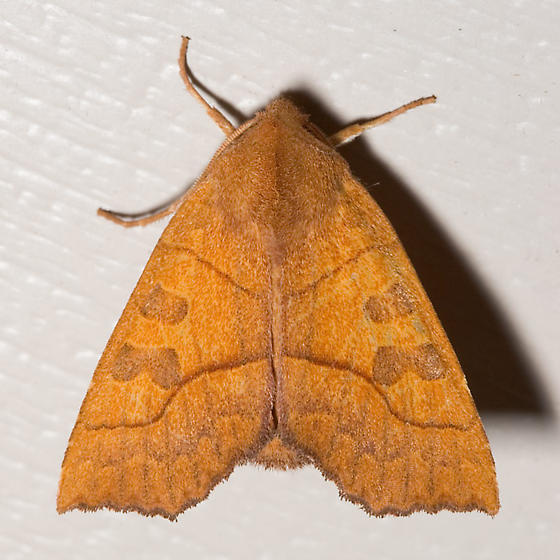
Eucirroedia pampina

- Eucirroedia pampina (Guenée, 1852)
