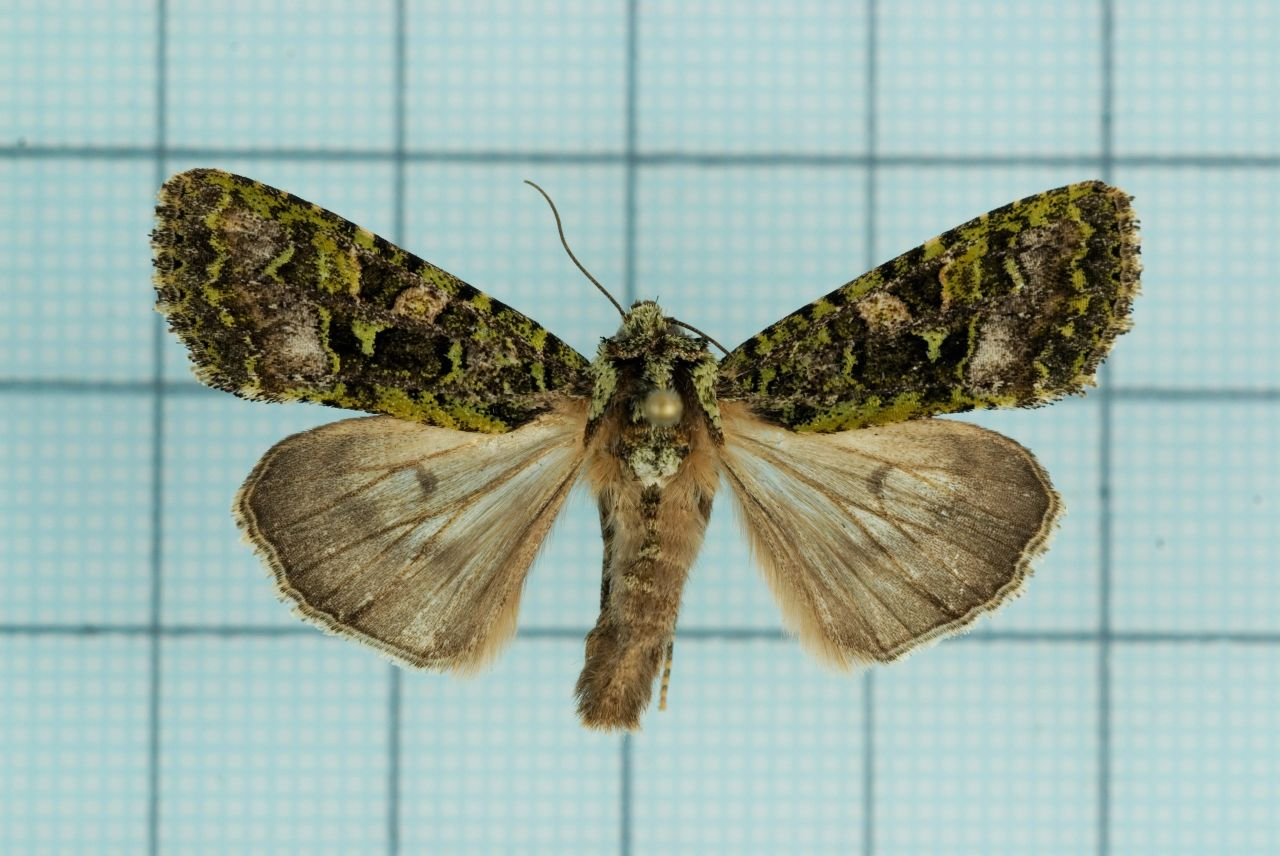
- Euplexidia pallidivirens

Scientific classification
- Kingdom: Animalia
- Phylum: Arthropoda
- Class: Insecta
- Order: Lepidoptera
- Superfamily: Noctuoidea
- Family: Noctuidae
- Genus: Euplexidia; Hampson, 1896

= Euplexidia =

Genus of moths

Euplexidia is a genus of moths of the family Noctuidae.

== Species ==
- Euplexidia albiguttata (Warren, 1912)
- Euplexidia angusta Yoshimoto, 1987
- Euplexidia benescripta (Prout)
- Euplexidia exotica Yoshimoto, 1987
- Euplexidia noctuiformis (Hampson, 1896)
- Euplexidia pallidivirens Yoshimoto, 1987
- Euplexidia violascens (Boursin, 1964)
