= Eicomorpha =

Scientific classification
- Kingdom: Animalia
- Phylum: Arthropoda
- Class: Insecta
- Order: Lepidoptera
- Superfamily: Noctuoidea
- Family: Noctuidae
- Subfamily: Noctuinae
- Genus: Eicomorpha; Staudinger, 1888

Genus of moths

Eicomorpha is a genus of moths of the family Noctuidae.

== Species ==
- Eicomorpha antiqua Staudinger, 1888
- Eicomorpha epipsiloides Bousin, 1970
- Eicomorpha firyuza Ronkay, Varga & Hreblay, 1998
- Eicomorpha koeppeni Alphéraky, 1893
- Eicomorpha kurdistana de Freina & Hacker, 1985
