= Eugraptoblemma =

Scientific classification
- Domain: Eukaryota
- Kingdom: Animalia
- Phylum: Arthropoda
- Class: Insecta
- Order: Lepidoptera
- Superfamily: Noctuoidea
- Family: Noctuidae
- Subfamily: Acontiinae
- Genus: Eugraptoblemma; Warren in Seitz, 1913

Genus of moths

Eugraptoblemma is a genus of moths of the family Noctuidae. The genus was erected by Warren in 1913.

== Species ==
- Eugraptoblemma pictalis (Hampson, 1898) Khasis
- Eugraptoblemma rosealis (Hampson, 1896) Bhutan
- Eugraptoblemma utsugii Kishida, 2010 Japan
