= Ectogoniella =

Scientific classification
- Domain: Eukaryota
- Kingdom: Animalia
- Phylum: Arthropoda
- Class: Insecta
- Order: Lepidoptera
- Superfamily: Noctuoidea
- Family: Erebidae
- Subfamily: Hypeninae
- Genus: Ectogoniella; Strand, 1920

Genus of moths

Ectogoniella is a genus of moths of the family Erebidae. The genus was described by Strand in 1920.

== Species ==
- Ectogoniella insularis Sugi, 1982 Japan
- Ectogoniella pangraptalis Strand, 1920 Taiwan
