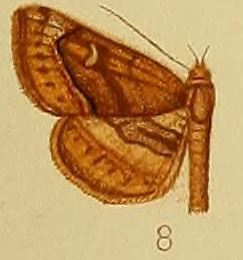
- Eucampima coenotype

Scientific classification
- Domain: Eukaryota
- Kingdom: Animalia
- Phylum: Arthropoda
- Class: Insecta
- Order: Lepidoptera
- Superfamily: Noctuoidea
- Family: Erebidae
- Subfamily: Calpinae
- Genus: Eucampima; Wileman & South, 1921

= Eucampima =

Genus of moths

Eucampima is a genus of moths of the family Erebidae. The genus was described by Wileman and South in 1921.

== Species ==
- Eucampima atritoinalis Hampson, 1926
- Eucampima coenotype Hampson, 1910
- Eucampima griseisigna Wileman & South, 1921
- Eucampima poliostidza Hampson, 1926
- Eucampima violalis Gaede, 1940
