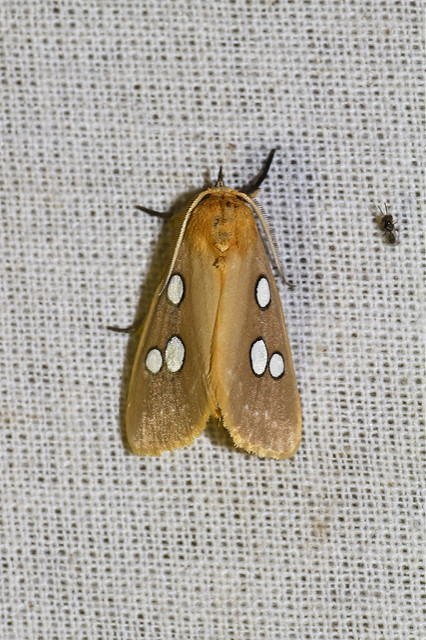
- Rhanidophora cinctigutta from Vernon Crookes Nature Reserve, South Africa

Scientific classification
- Kingdom: Animalia
- Phylum: Arthropoda
- Class: Insecta
- Order: Lepidoptera
- Superfamily: Noctuoidea
- Family: Erebidae
- Subfamily: Calpinae
- Genus: Rhanidophora; Wallengren, 1858

Synonyms
- Enydra Walker, 1862

= Rhanidophora =

Genus of moths

Rhanidophora is a genus of moths of the family Erebidae. The genus was described by Wallengren in 1858.

== Species ==
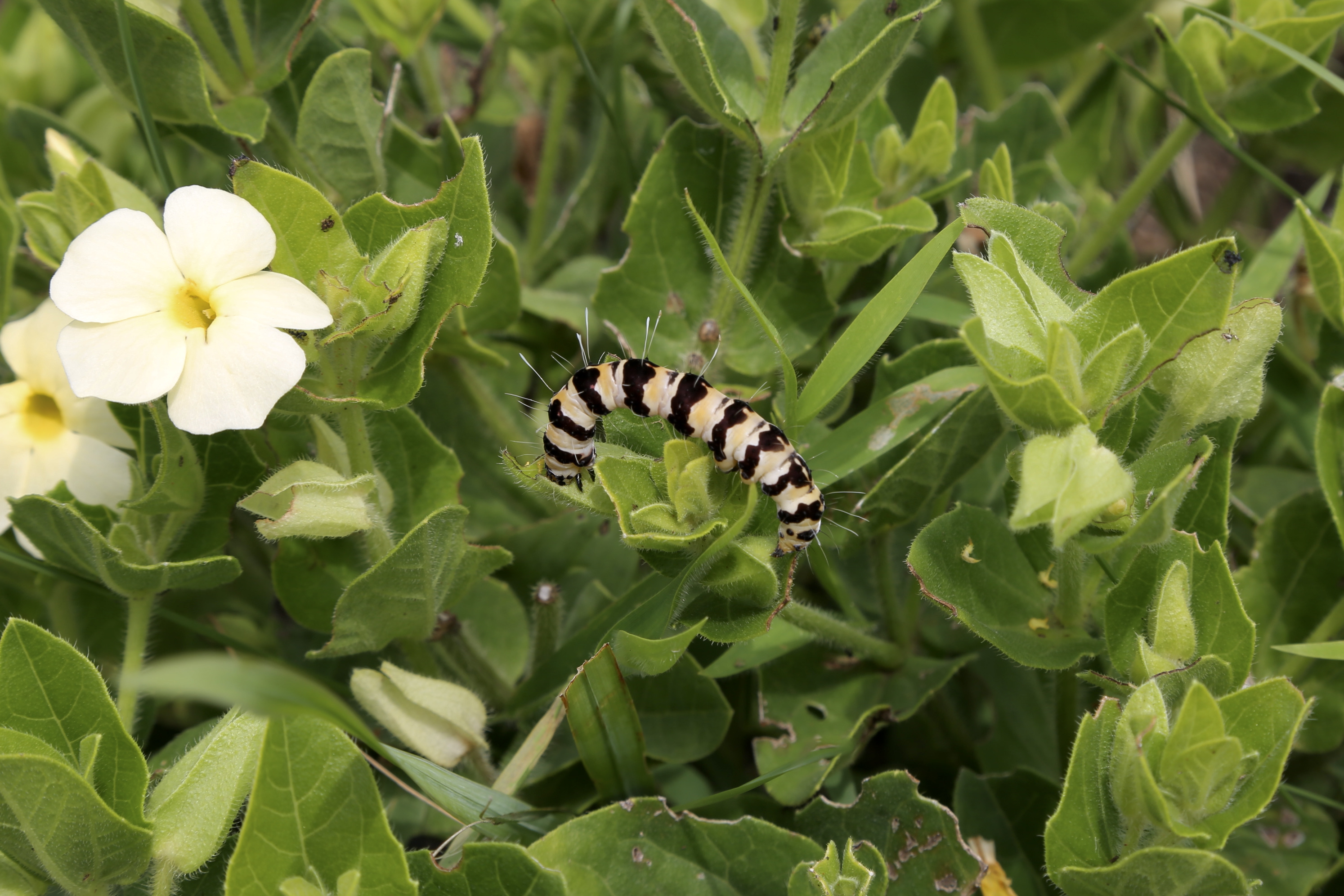
Rhanidophora cinctigutta caterpillar on Thunbergia atriplicifolia in KwaZulu-Natal

- Rhanidophora aethiops Grünberg, 1907
- Rhanidophora agrippa H. Druce, 1899
- Rhanidophora albigutta Fawcett, 1915
- Rhanidophora aurantiaca Hampson, 1902
- Rhanidophora cinctigutta Walker, 1862
- Rhanidophora enucleata Mabille, 1900
- Rhanidophora flava Bethune-Baker, 1911
- Rhanidophora flavigutta Hampson, 1926
- Rhanidophora phedonia Stoll, 1782
- Rhanidophora odontophora Hampson, 1926
- Rhanidophora piguerator Hampson, 1926
- Rhanidophora ridens Hampson, 1902
- Rhanidophora septipunctata Bethune-Baker, 1909
