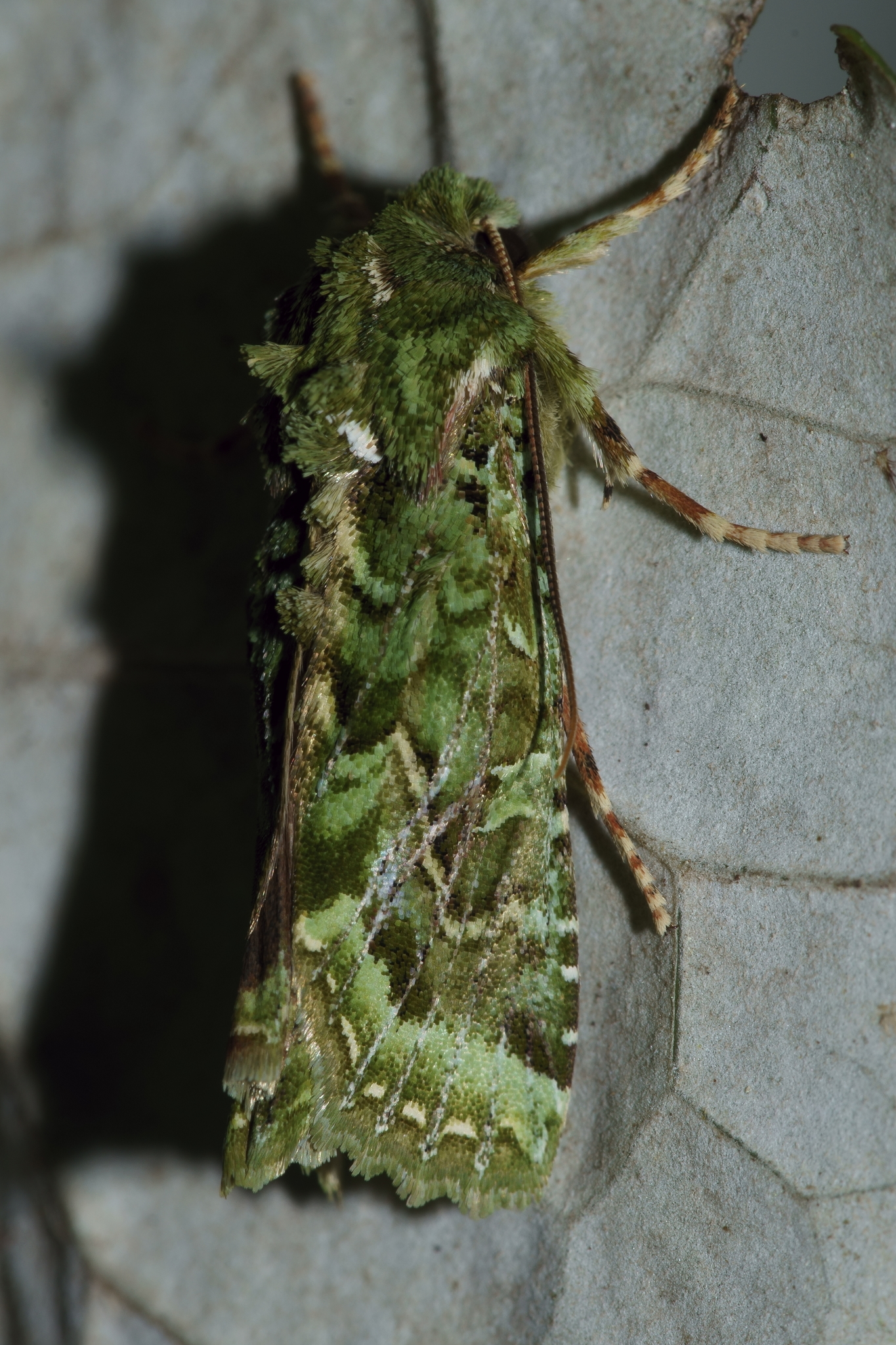
- Feredayia graminosa, New Zealand

Scientific classification
- Kingdom: Animalia
- Phylum: Arthropoda
- Class: Insecta
- Order: Lepidoptera
- Superfamily: Noctuoidea
- Family: Noctuidae
- Subfamily: Noctuinae
- Tribe: Hadenini; Guenée, 1837

= Hadenini =

Tribe of moths

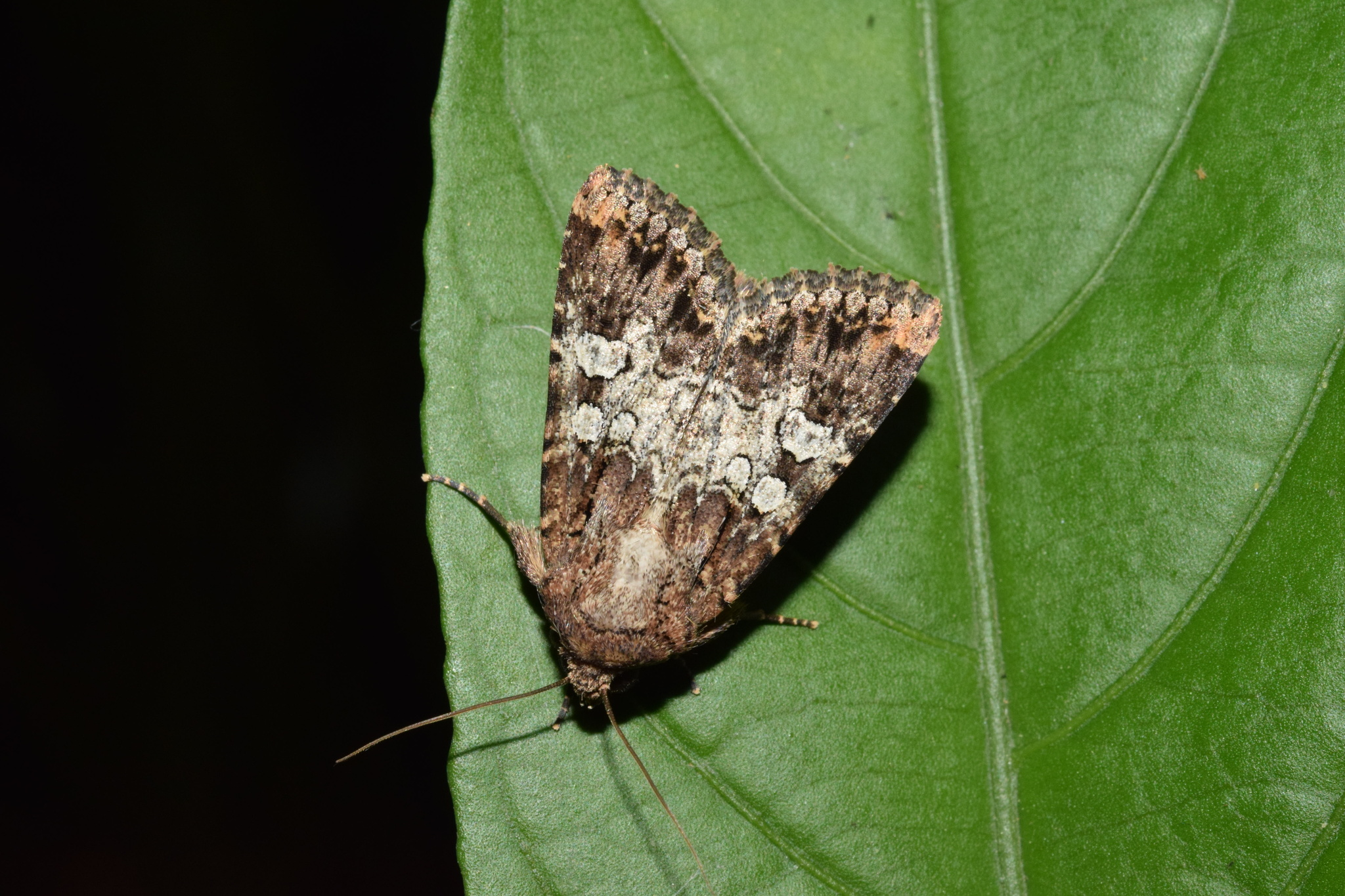
Omphalestra mesoglauca, dot moth, South Africa

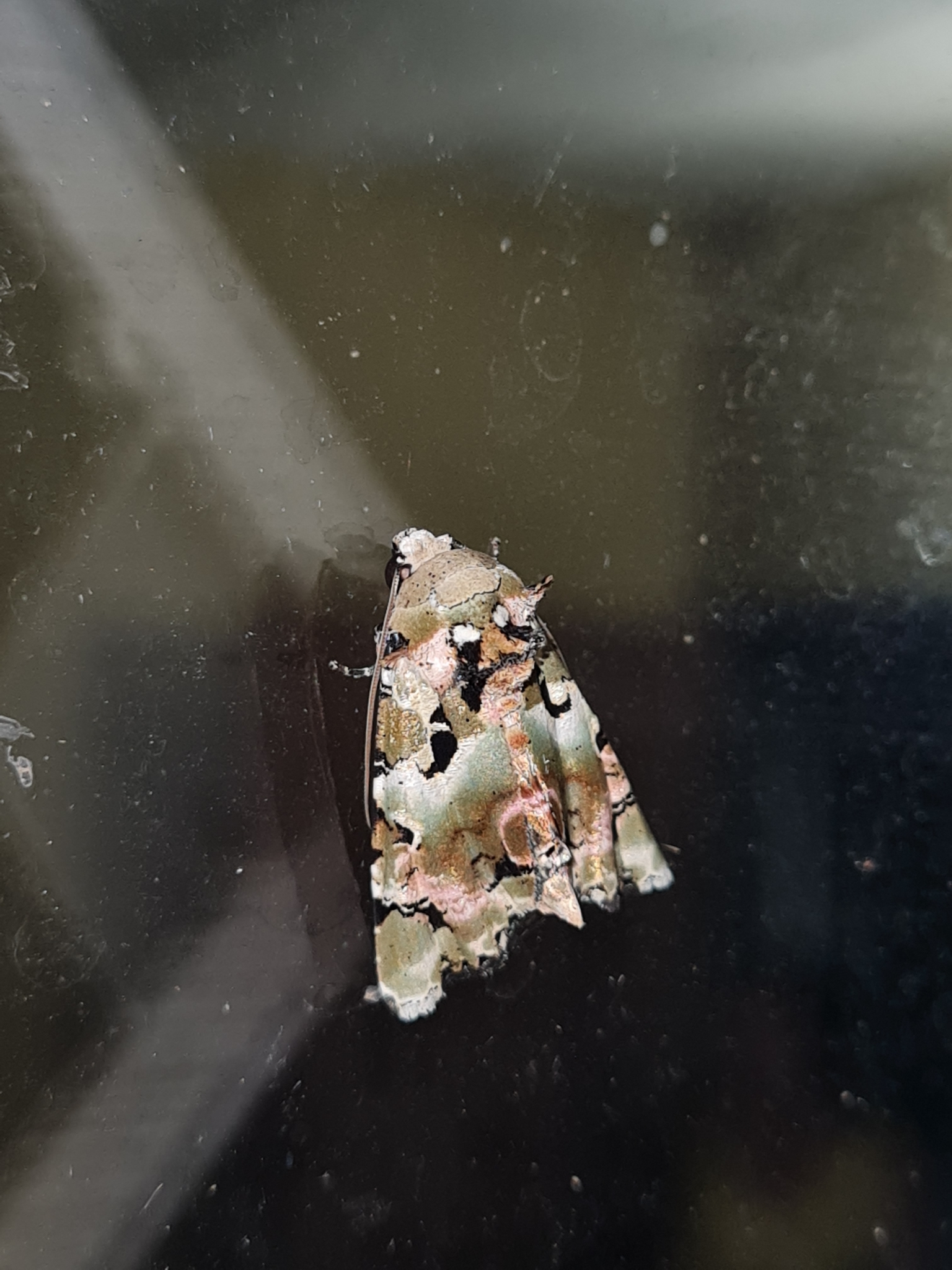
Heterochroma hypatia, Panama

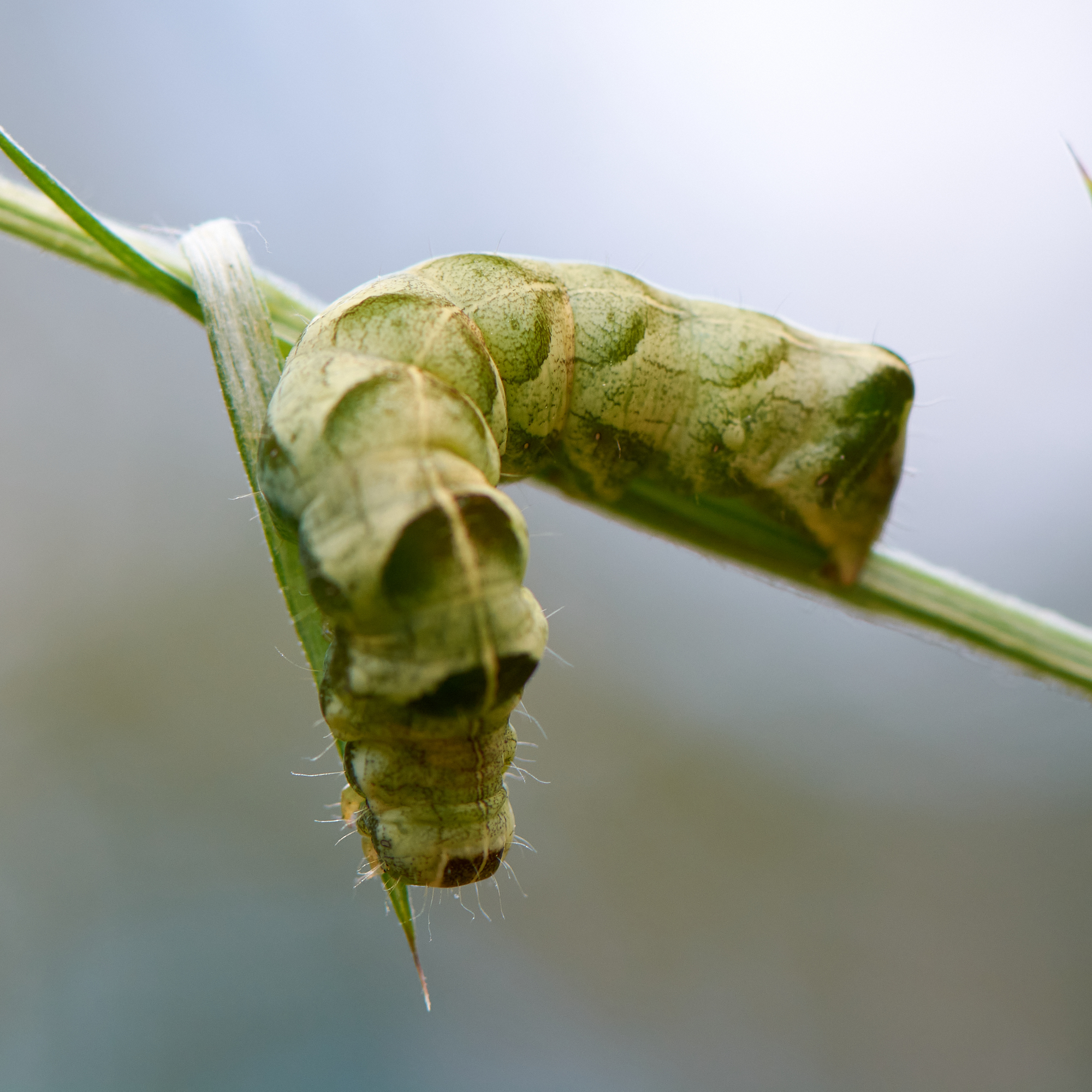
Melanchra persicariae, dot moth, Russia

Hadenini is a tribe of cutworm or dart moths in the family Noctuidae. There are more than 140 genera and 1,000 described species in Hadenini, found worldwide.

Hadenini was formerly a tribe of the subfamily Hadeninae, but Hadeninae was moved to the subfamily Noctuinae. The tribes Apameini, Caradrinini, Elaphriini, Episemini, Eriopygini, Hadenini, Leucaniini, Orthosiini, and Xylenini were moved from Hadeninae to Noctuinae.

== Genera ==
These 145 genera belong to Hadenini.

- Afotella Barnes & Benjamin, 1925
- Anapoma Berio, 1980
- Anarta Ochsenheimer, 1816
- Anartomorpha Alphéraky, 1892
- Antha Staudinger, 1892
- Apospasta Fletcher D.S., 1959
- Aspidifrontia Hampson, 1902
- Bambusiphila Sugi, 1958
- Brithysana Viette, 1963
- Calpiformis Hampson, 1908
- Campydelta Berio, 1964
- Capillamentum Pinhey, 1956
- Caradjia Zerny, 1928
- Cardepia Hampson, 1905
- Catamecia Staudinger, 1898
- Catasema Staudinger, 1888
- Centrochlora Dyar, 1912
- Ceramica Guenée, 1852
- Chabuata Walker, 1858
- Chandata Moore, 1882
- Chlorognesia Warren, 1913
- Chortodes
- Cirrodes Hampson, 1910
- Clavipalpula Staudinger, 1892
- Clemathada Beck, 1996
- Closteromorpha R.Felder, 1874
- Cnodifrontia Hampson, 1902
- Conicofrontia Hampson, 1902
- Conisania Hampson, 1905
- Copifrontia Hampson, 1905
- Coranarta Beck, 1991
- Cornutifera Varga & Ronkay, 1991
- Craterestra Hampson, 1905
- Crosia Dupont, 1910
- Ctenoceratoda Varga, 1992
- Cyclopera Hampson, 1908
- Cyptonychia Hampson, 1900
- Cytocanis Hampson, 1910
- Cytothymia Hampson, 1908
- Dargida Walker, 1856
- Dicerogastra Fletcher D.S., 1961
- Dictyestra Sugi, 1982
- Dimorphicosmia Sugi, 1982
- Diparopsis Hampson, 1902
- Discestra
- Ebertidia Boursin, 1967
- Ectolopha Hampson, 1902
- Elyptron Saalmüller, 1891
- Enterpia Guenée, 1850
- Eremochroa Meyrick, 1897
- Escaria Grote, 1882
- Ethiopica Hampson, 1909
- Ethioterpia Hampson, 1910
- Eulymnia Hampson, 1908
- Euromoia Staudinger, 1892
- Eurypsyche Butler, 1886
- Euterpiodes Hampson, 1908
- Euxenistis Warren, 1910
- Feredayia Kirkaldy, 1910
- Floccifera
- Goenycta Hampson, 1909
- Hada Billberg, 1820
- Hadena Schrank, 1802
- Hadenella Grote, 1883
- Haderonia Staudinger, 1895
- Hadula
- Haplocestra Aurivillius, 1910
- Hecatera Guenée, 1852
- Heterochroma Guenée, 1852
- Hypocalamia Hampson, 1910
- Hypoplexia Hampson, 1908
- Hyporbarathra
- Interdelta Berio, 1964
- Irene Saldaitis & Benedek, 2017
- Kisegira Hreblay & Ronkay, 1999
- Kollariana Hacker, 1996
- Lacanobia Billberg, 1820
- Lepidodelta Viette, 1967
- Leucapamea Sugi, 1982
- Lophotarsia Hampson, 1902
- Mamestra Ochsenheimer, 1816
- Mammifrontia Barnes & Lindsey, 1922
- Megaegira Ronkay, Ronkay, Gyulai & Hacker, 2010
- Melanchra Hübner, 1820
- Meliana
- Melionica Berio, 1970
- Mervia Daricheva, 1961
- Mesoplus Boursin, 1949
- Metopiora Meyrick, 1902
- Monostola Alphéraky, 1892
- Multisigna Varga, Ronkay & Ronkay, 2017
- Neopersectania Rodríguez & Angulo, 2007
- Neopistria Hampson, 1908
- Nereisana Strand, 1911
- Niaboma Nye, 1975
- Nyodes Laporte, 1971
- Odontestra Hampson, 1905
- Omphalestra Fletcher D.S., 1961
- Orthogonia Felder & Felder, 1862
- Pachetra Guenée, 1841
- Palponima Hampson, 1905
- Papestra Sukhareva, 1973
- Paracentropus Boursin, 1958
- Paracroria Hampson, 1908
- Polia Ochsenheimer, 1816
- Protomeceras Rebel, 1901
- Pseudamathes Rothschild, 1920
- Pseuderastria Hampson, 1908
- Pseuderiopus Warren, 1913
- Pygmeopolia Hreblay & Ronkay, 1998
- Rhynchoplexia Hampson, 1908
- Rougeotia Laporte, 1974
- Saalmuellerana Fletcher & Viette, 1962
- Sajania A.G. Vologdin, 1962
- Sapporia Sugi, 1982
- Saragossa Staudinger, 1900
- Sarcopolia Sugi, 1982
- Sciomesa Tams & Bowden, 1953
- Scotogramma H. Edwards, 1887
- Scriptania Hampson, 1905
- Selenistis Hampson, 1908
- Sidemia Staudinger, 1892
- Sideridis Hübner, 1821
- Sparkia Nye, 1975
- Speia Tams & Bowden, 1953
- Spiramater McCabe, 1980
- Stauropides Hampson, 1908
- Stomafrontia Hampson, 1905
- Sugiella Özdikmen, 2008
- Syncalama Hampson, 1908
- Thargelia Püngeler, 1899
- Thyatirodes Hampson, 1909
- Thyrestra Hampson, 1905
- Trichanarta Hampson, 1896
- Trichestra Hampson, 1905
- Tricheurois Hampson, 1905
- Trichocosmia Grote, 1883
- Trichordestra McCabe, 1980
- Tridepia McDunnough, 1937
- Trudestra McDunnough, 1937
- Turanica Boursin, 1963
- Tycomarptes Fletcher D.S., 1961
- Vietteania Rungs, 1956
- Xanthiria Hampson, 1910
- Xantholepis Hampson, 1910
