= Mammifrontia rileyi =

Scientific classification
- Domain: Eukaryota
- Kingdom: Animalia
- Phylum: Arthropoda
- Class: Insecta
- Order: Lepidoptera
- Superfamily: Noctuoidea
- Family: Noctuidae
- Tribe: Apameini
- Genus: Mammifrontia
- Species: M. rileyi

Binomial name
- Mammifrontia rileyi Benjamin, 1936

Species of moth

Mammifrontia rileyi is a species of cutworm or dart moth in the family Noctuidae. It is found in North America.

The MONA or Hodges number for Mammifrontia rileyi is 9447.
