= Elyptron cinctum =

Scientific classification
- Kingdom: Animalia
- Phylum: Arthropoda
- Clade: Pancrustacea
- Class: Insecta
- Order: Lepidoptera
- Superfamily: Noctuoidea
- Family: Noctuidae
- Genus: Elyptron
- Species: E. cinctum

Binomial name
- Elyptron cinctum Saalmüller, 1891

Species of moth

Elyptron cinctum is a moth in the family Noctuidae. It is found in Madagascar.

Saalmüller described this species as of brown colour with a wingspan of 23mm.
