= Apospasta pannosa =

Scientific classification
- Kingdom: Animalia
- Phylum: Arthropoda
- Clade: Pancrustacea
- Class: Insecta
- Order: Lepidoptera
- Superfamily: Noctuoidea
- Family: Noctuidae
- Genus: Apospasta
- Species: A. pannosa

Binomial name
- Apospasta pannosa (Moore, 1881)

Synonyms
- Apamea pannosa Moore, 1881

Species of moth

Apospasta pannosa is a moth of the family Noctuidae first described by Frederic Moore in 1881. It is found in Sri Lanka, and India.
