= Campydelta campyla =

Scientific classification
- Kingdom: Animalia
- Phylum: Arthropoda
- Clade: Pancrustacea
- Class: Insecta
- Order: Lepidoptera
- Superfamily: Noctuoidea
- Family: Noctuidae
- Genus: Campydelta
- Species: C. campyla

Binomial name
- Campydelta campyla (Hampson, 1909)

Synonyms
- Delta campyla Hampson, 1909

Species of moth

Campydelta campyla is a moth in the family Noctuidae first described by George Hampson in 1909. It is found in much of central Africa.
