= Campydelta =

Scientific classification
- Domain: Eukaryota
- Kingdom: Animalia
- Phylum: Arthropoda
- Class: Insecta
- Order: Lepidoptera
- Superfamily: Noctuoidea
- Family: Noctuidae
- Tribe: Hadenini
- Genus: Campydelta; Berio, 1964

Synonyms
- Lepidodelta Viette, 1967; Delta Saalmüller, 1891

Genus of moths

Campydelta is a genus of moths of the family Noctuidae. The genus was erected by Emilio Berio in 1964.

== Species ==
- Campydelta campyla (Hampson, 1909) Sierra Leone, Ivory Coast, Ghana, Zaire, Malawi, Tanzania, Zambia, Zimbabwe
- Campydelta phoenicraspis (Hampson, 1910) Zaire, Zambia, Zimbabwe
- Campydelta stolifera (Saalmüller, 1891) Madagascar
