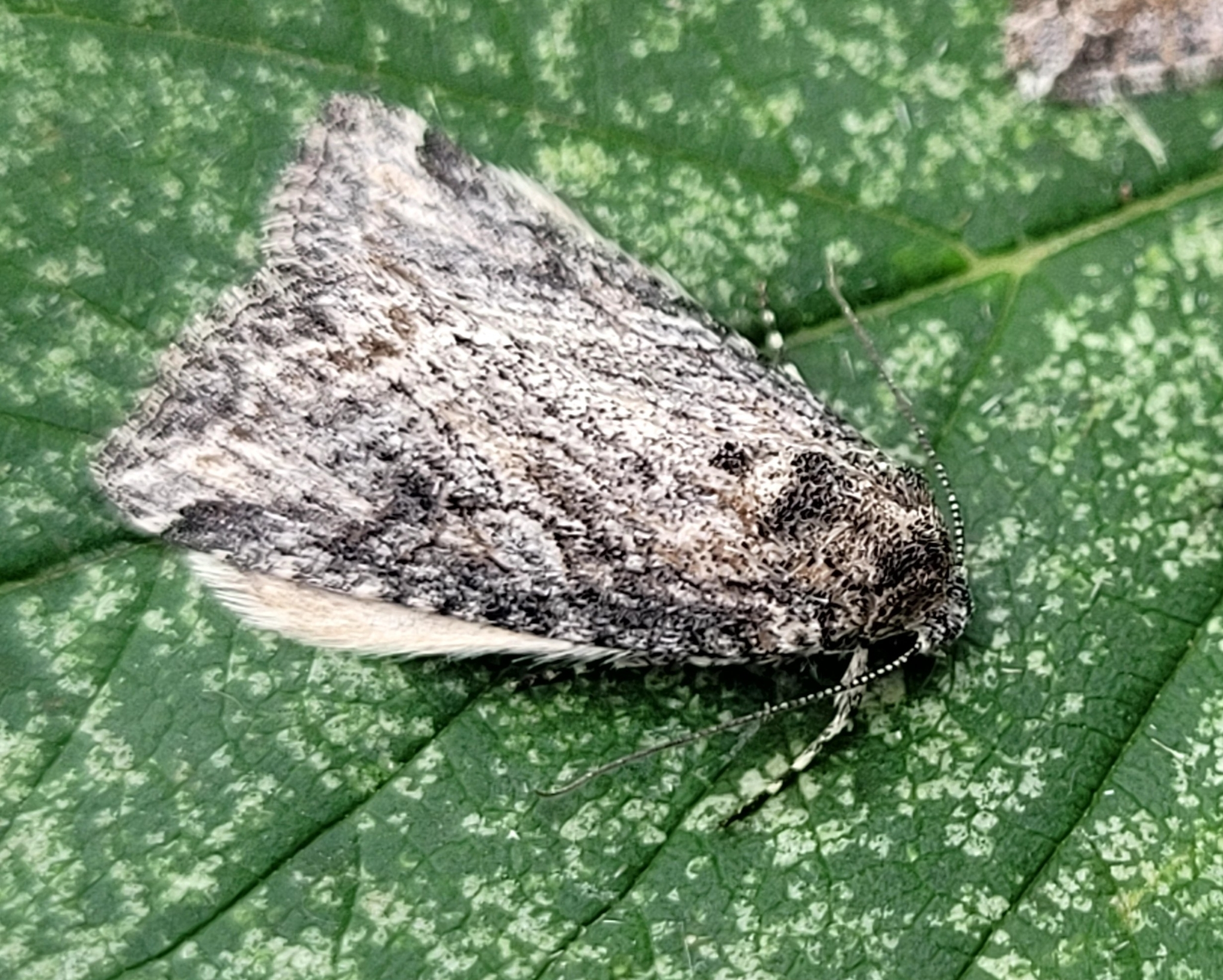

Scientific classification
- Domain: Eukaryota
- Kingdom: Animalia
- Phylum: Arthropoda
- Class: Insecta
- Order: Lepidoptera
- Superfamily: Noctuoidea
- Family: Noctuidae
- Tribe: Hadenini
- Genus: Afotella; Barnes & Benjamin, 1926
- Species: A. cylindrica

Binomial name
- Afotella cylindrica Grote, 1880

Synonyms
- Hadena cylindrica

= Afotella =

Genus of moths

Afotella is a monotypic moth genus of the family Noctuidae erected by William Barnes and Foster Hendrickson Benjamin in 1926. Its only species, Afotella cylindrica, was first described by Augustus Radcliffe Grote in 1880. It is found in western North America from Saskatchewan and Alberta south to California.

The wingspan is about 25 mm.
