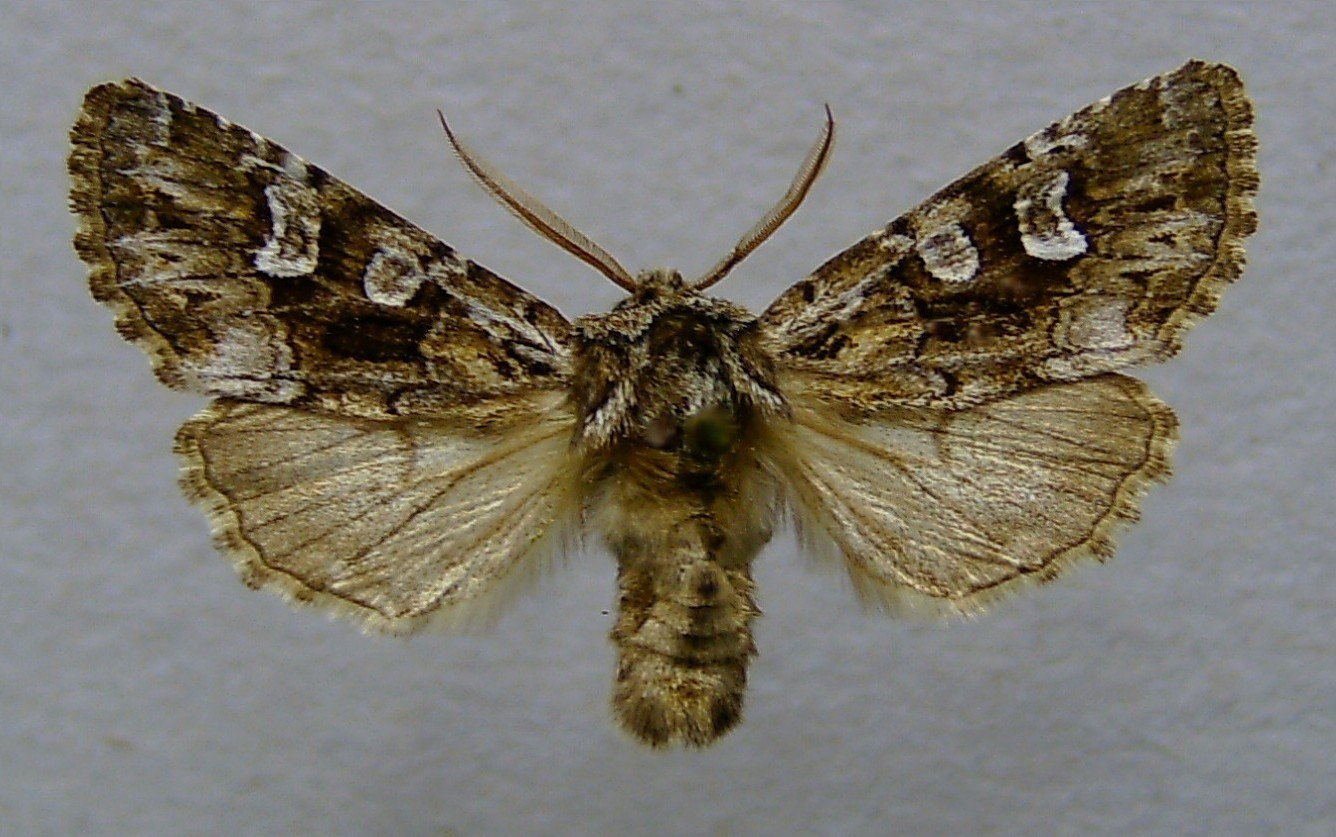

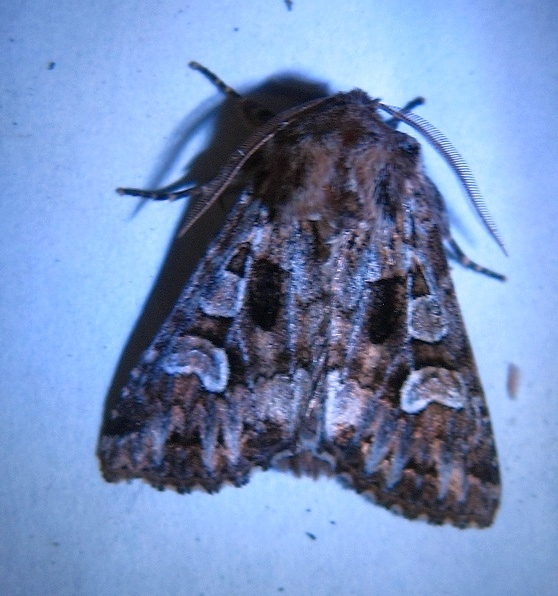

Scientific classification
- Kingdom: Animalia
- Phylum: Arthropoda
- Clade: Pancrustacea
- Class: Insecta
- Order: Lepidoptera
- Superfamily: Noctuoidea
- Family: Noctuidae
- Tribe: Hadenini
- Genus: Pachetra; Guenée, 1841
- Species: P. sagittigera

Binomial name
- Pachetra sagittigera (Hufnagel, 1766)

Synonyms
- Pachetra leucophaea; Mamestra leucophaea; Pachetra fulminea

= Pachetra =

Genus of moths

Pachetra is a monotypic genus of moth in the family Noctuidae erected by Achille Guenée in 1841. Its only species, Pachetra sagittigera, the feathered ear, was first described by Johann Siegfried Hufnagel in 1766. It is found in central and southern Europe, east to the Ural, north to southern England, Sweden and Finland. Southwards it is found from Anatolia, central Asia and the Altai up to Mongolia. It is also present in North Africa.

== Technical description and variation ==
The wingspan is 32–45 mm. Forewing grey suffused with darker grey and brown; claviform stigma variable in size, blackish; upper stigmata large, white edged with grey centres, sometimes wholly white: submarginal line diffusely pale, preceded by black wedge-shaped marks; hindwing dirty grey, with darker cellspot, postmedian line, and submarginal cloud; in vestigialis Esp. there is a prominent white patch at base of costa of forewing; — ravida Esp. is a rarer form in which the median and marginal areas are both reddish brown; — pyrenaica Oberth. [now ssp.], from the Pyrenees, is a melanic form in which the forewings are suffused all over with blackish grey; — bombycina Ev., from the Ural Mts., is smaller and darker, with the median and submedian veins finely white; both the upper stigmata much smaller, white edged, the reniform not kidney shaped but narrow with the white lateral edges parallel, the lower end flat, not curved, and according to Eversmann running inwards along the median vein; on the other hand ab. incana Mill, is a quite pale form; yet another form, from the Sila Mts., Calabria, seems to require a name ab. grisescens nov. [Warren]. The 6 males seen, rather smaller than typical fulminea, are dark grey suffused with fuscous, without any admixture of brown or ochreous; the upper stigmata grey with white outlines, the claviform black; the underside is whitish powdered with grey, the cellspots large; an outer line on both wings. Syrian specimens, according to Hampson, have the hindwing white, and the veins only brown.

== Biology ==
Adults are on wing from May to July. There is one generation per year.

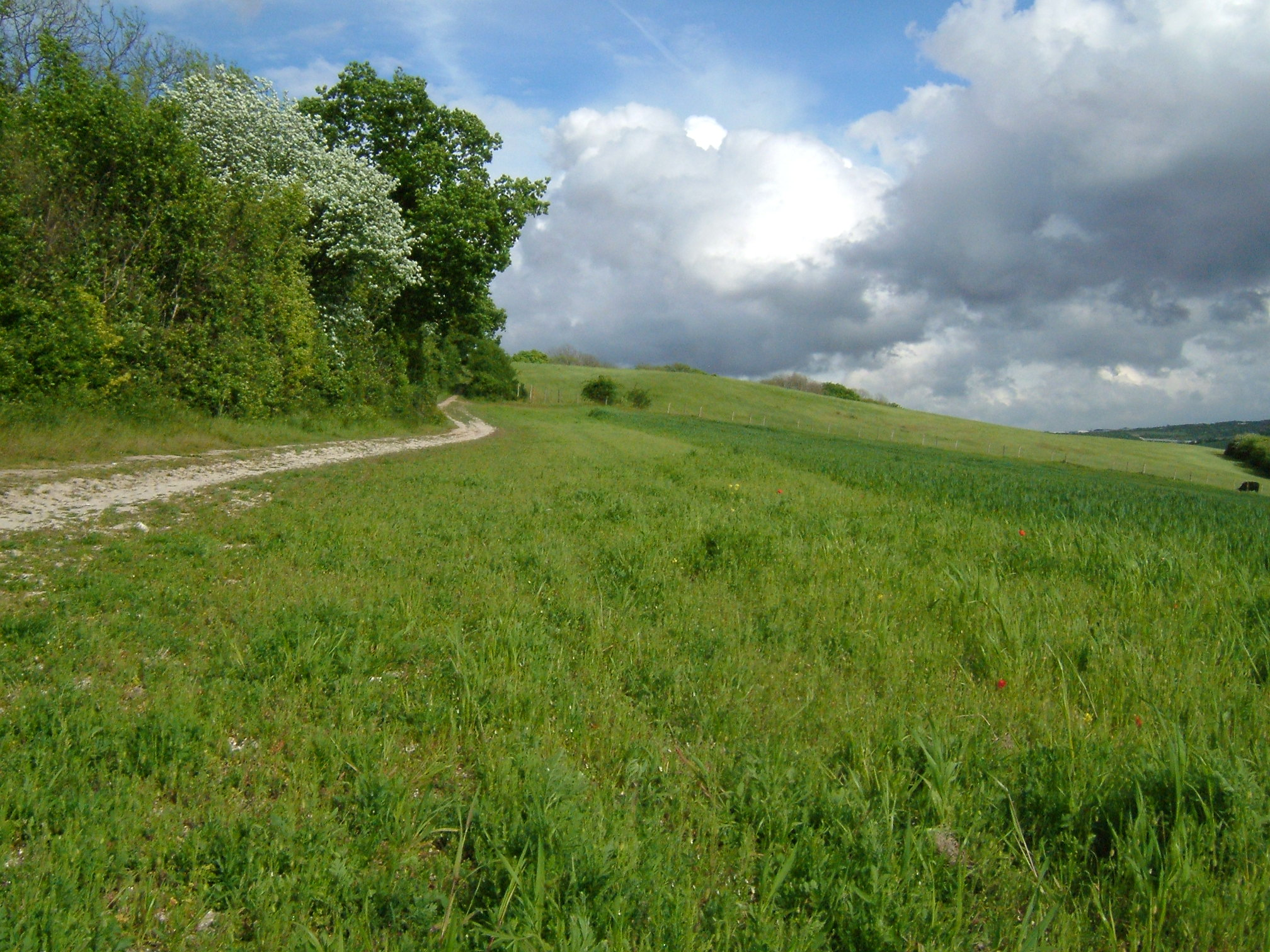
Habitat in England

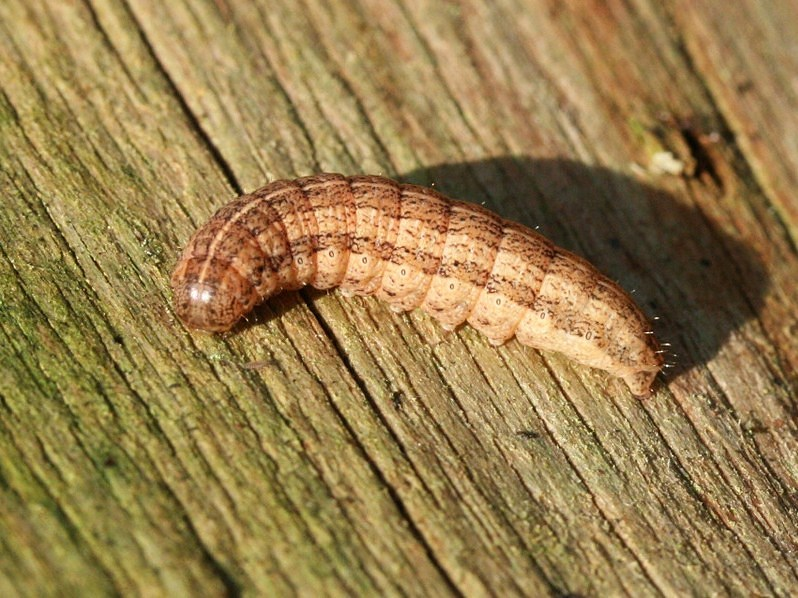
Larva

Larva grey brown, mottled with dark; dorsal line yellowish, black edged; a series of oblique brown subdorsal stripes; lateral lines narrowly brown. The larvae feed on various grasses, including Festuca ovina, Poa and Gramineae species.

== Subspecies ==
- Pachetra sagittigera sagittigera
- Pachetra sagittigera melanophaea (North Africa)
- Pachetra sagittigera britannica (Britain), presumed extinct
