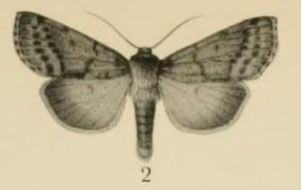

Scientific classification
- Kingdom: Animalia
- Phylum: Arthropoda
- Clade: Pancrustacea
- Class: Insecta
- Order: Lepidoptera
- Superfamily: Noctuoidea
- Family: Noctuidae
- Genus: Apospasta
- Species: A. eriopygioides

Binomial name
- Apospasta eriopygioides (Aurivillius, 1910)

Synonyms
- Borolia eriopygioides Aurivillius, 1910

= Apospasta eriopygioides =

Species of moth

Apospasta eriopygioides is a species of moth of the family Noctuidae. It is found in Tanzania.
