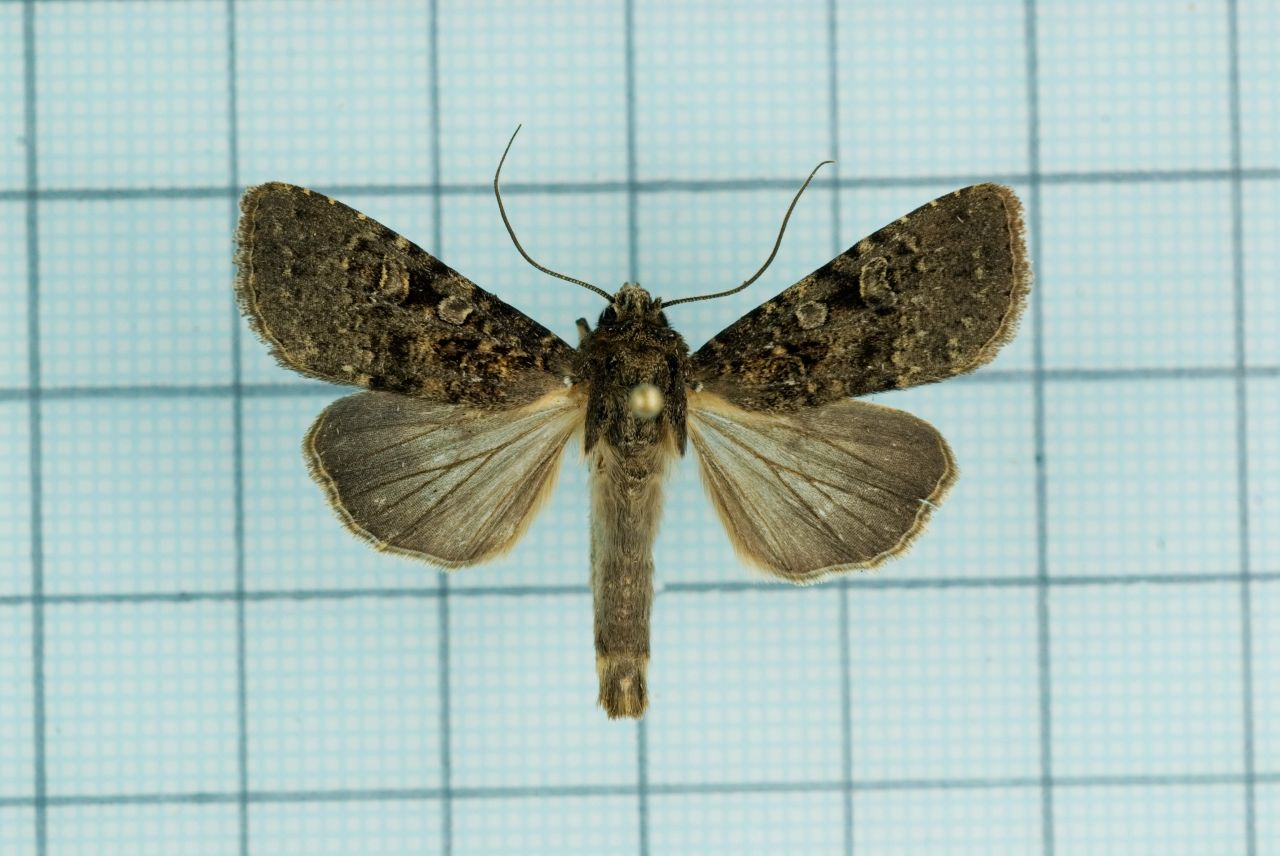

Scientific classification
- Kingdom: Animalia
- Phylum: Arthropoda
- Clade: Pancrustacea
- Class: Insecta
- Order: Lepidoptera
- Superfamily: Noctuoidea
- Family: Noctuidae
- Genus: Apospasta
- Species: A. rantaizanensis

Binomial name
- Apospasta rantaizanensis (Wileman, 1915)

Synonyms
- Polia rantaizanensis Wileman, 1915

= Apospasta rantaizanensis =

Species of moth

Apospasta rantaizanensis is a moth of the family Noctuidae. It is found in Taiwan.
