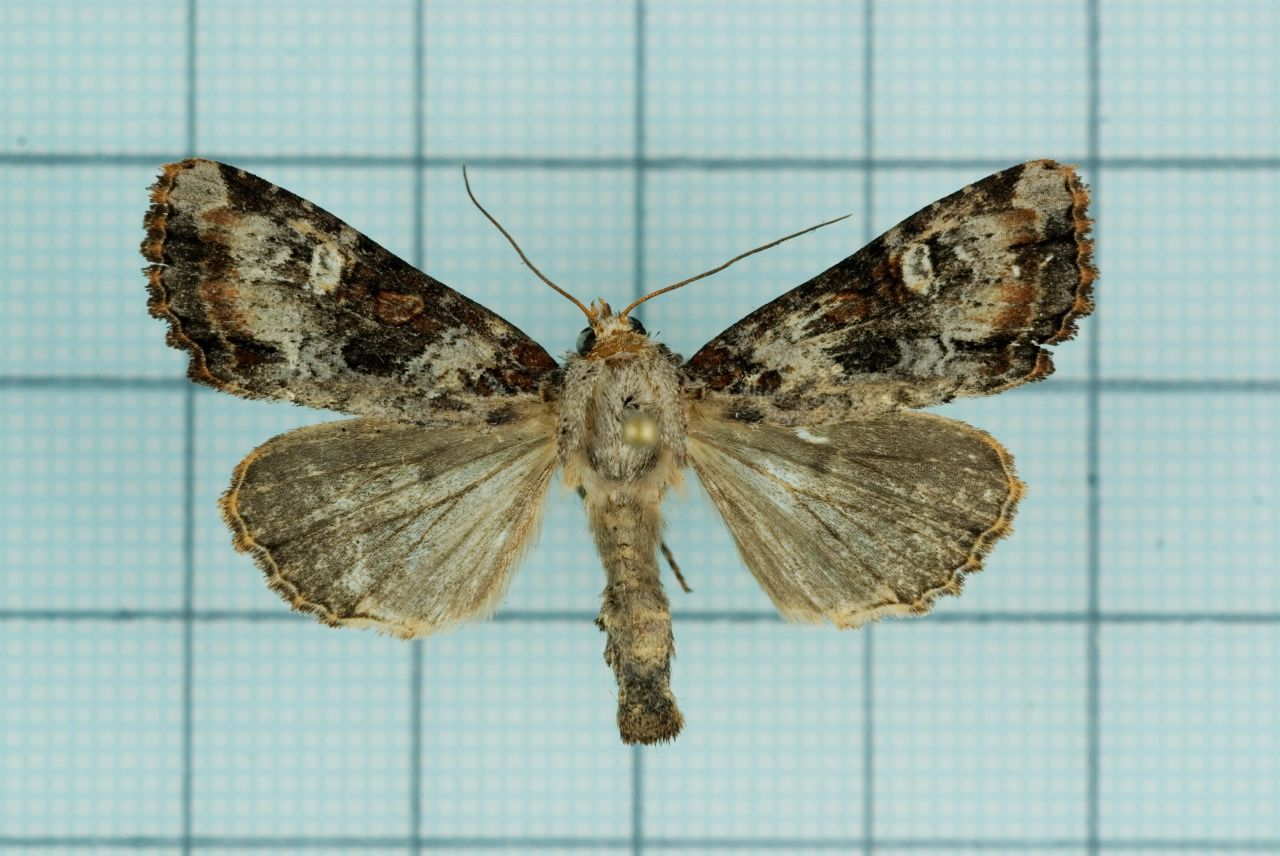
- Female
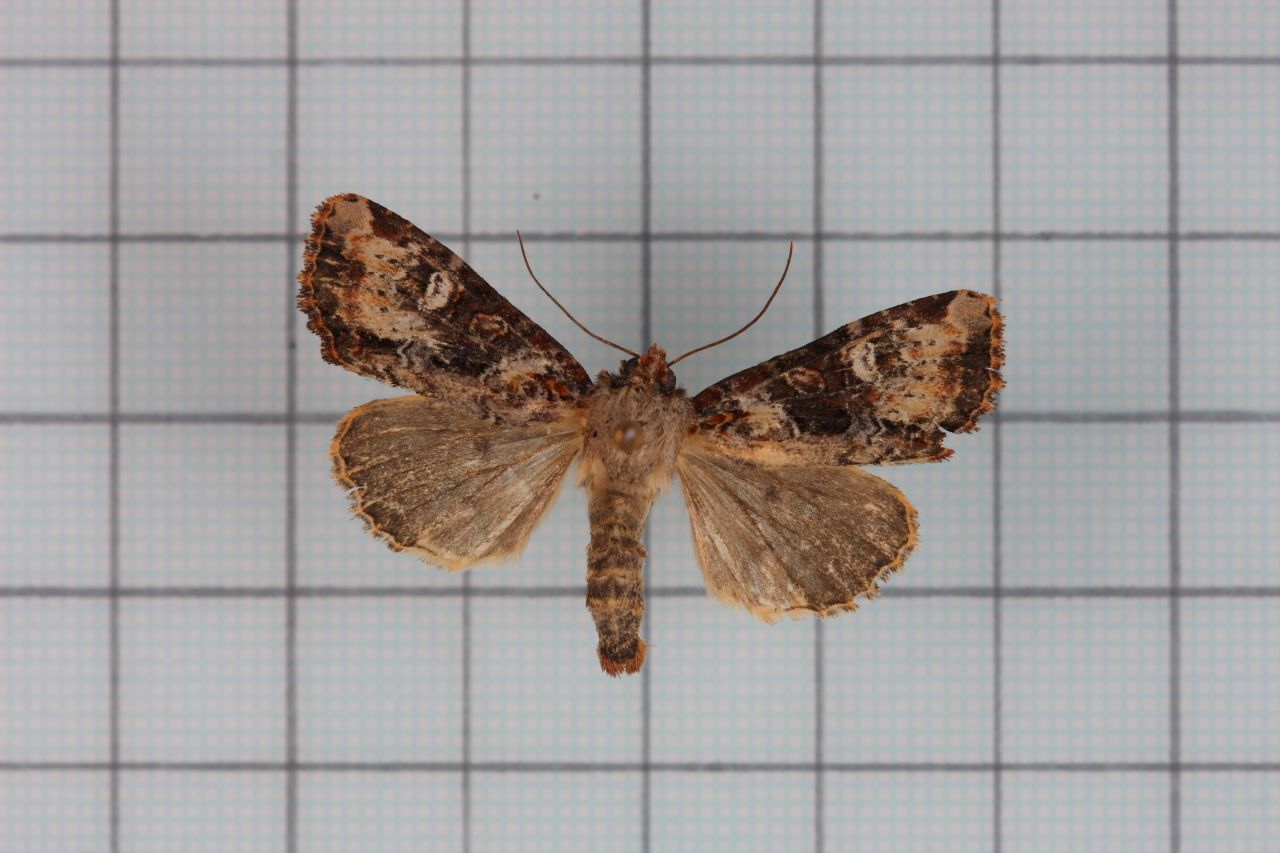
- Male

Scientific classification
- Kingdom: Animalia
- Phylum: Arthropoda
- Class: Insecta
- Order: Lepidoptera
- Superfamily: Noctuoidea
- Family: Noctuidae
- Genus: Leucapamea
- Species: L. formosensis

Binomial name
- Leucapamea formosensis (Hampson, 1910)

Synonyms
- Trachea formosensis Hampson, 1910; Apamea formosensis

= Leucapamea formosensis =

Species of moth

Leucapamea formosensis is a moth in the family Noctuidae. It is found in Taiwan.
