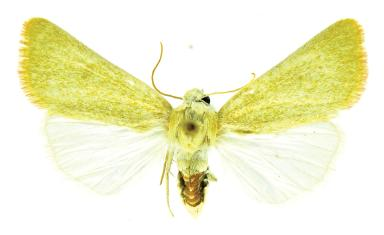
- Male
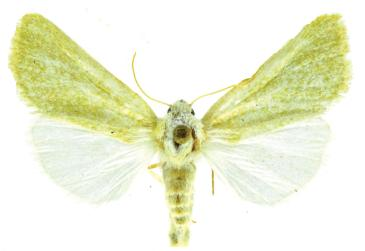
- Female

Scientific classification
- Kingdom: Animalia
- Phylum: Arthropoda
- Class: Insecta
- Order: Lepidoptera
- Superfamily: Noctuoidea
- Family: Noctuidae
- Tribe: Hadenini
- Genus: Sparkia; Nye, 1975
- Species: S. immacula

Binomial name
- Sparkia immacula (Grote, 1883)

Synonyms
- Cea immacula Grote, 1883

= Sparkia =

Genus of moths

Sparkia is a genus of moths of the family Noctuidae. It contains only one species, Sparkia immacula, which is found in Arizona and New Mexico.

The length of the forewings is 11.4–13.5 mm for males and 12.5–14 mm for females. Adults are pale greenish-yellow without transverse markings or spots. Adult are on wing from mid June to the end of August.
