= Sciomesa betschi =

Scientific classification
- Kingdom: Animalia
- Phylum: Arthropoda
- Class: Insecta
- Order: Lepidoptera
- Superfamily: Noctuoidea
- Family: Noctuidae
- Genus: Sciomesa
- Species: S. betschi

Binomial name
- Sciomesa betschi Viette, 1967

Species of moth

Sciomesa betschi is a moth of the family Noctuidae. It is found in Madagascar.

It has a wingspan of 27 mm and a length of the forewings of 14mm.
