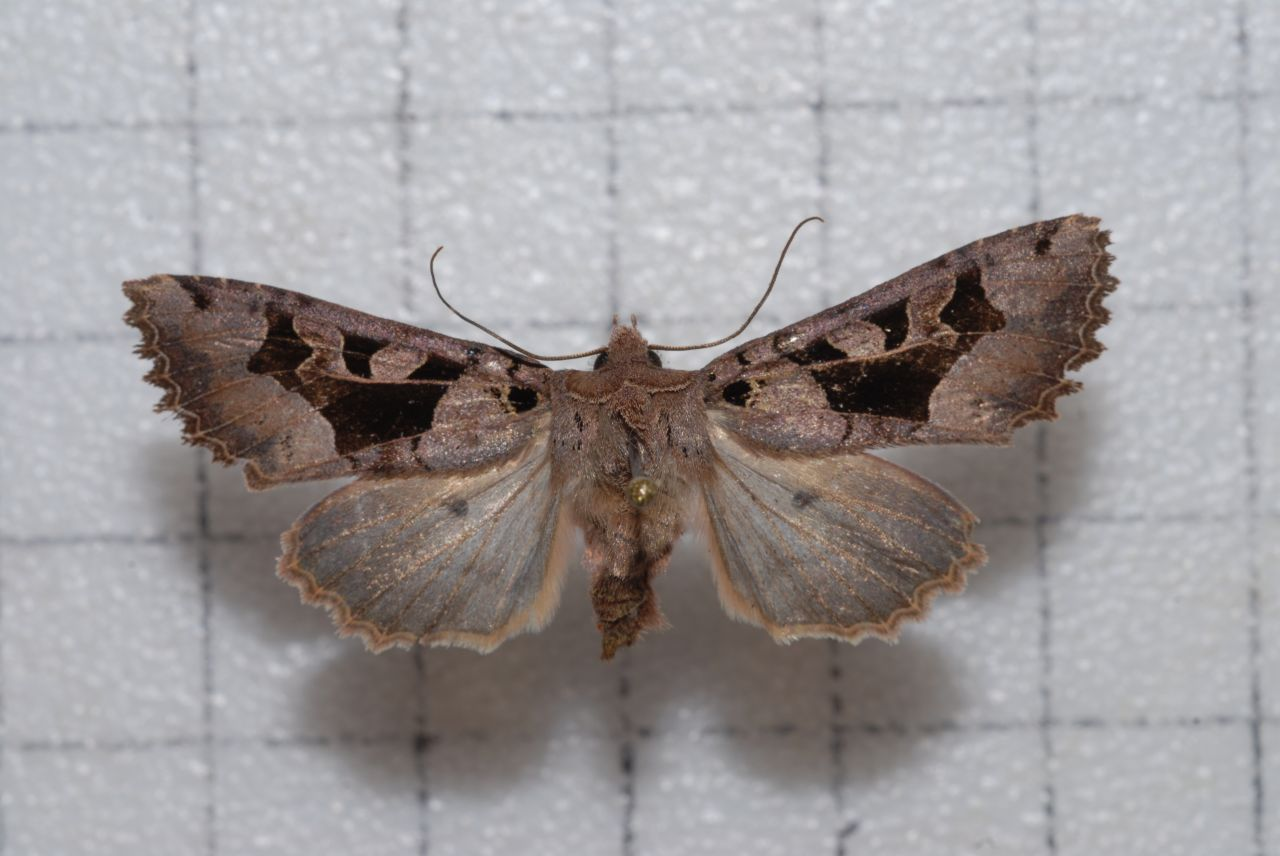

Scientific classification
- Kingdom: Animalia
- Phylum: Arthropoda
- Clade: Pancrustacea
- Class: Insecta
- Order: Lepidoptera
- Superfamily: Noctuoidea
- Family: Noctuidae
- Genus: Clavipalpula
- Species: C. aurariae

Binomial name
- Clavipalpula aurariae (Oberthür, 1880)

Synonyms
- Taeniocampa aurariae Oberthür, 1880; Perigrapha pfennigschmidti Hoene, 1917

= Clavipalpula aurariae =

Species of moth

Clavipalpula aurariae is a species of moth in the family Noctuidae. It is found in Japan and Taiwan.

The wingspan is 37–43 mm.

== Subspecies ==
- Clavipalpula aurariae aurariae
- Clavipalpula aurariae formosana G. Ronkay L. Ronkay, P. Gyulai & Hacker, 2010 (Taiwan)
