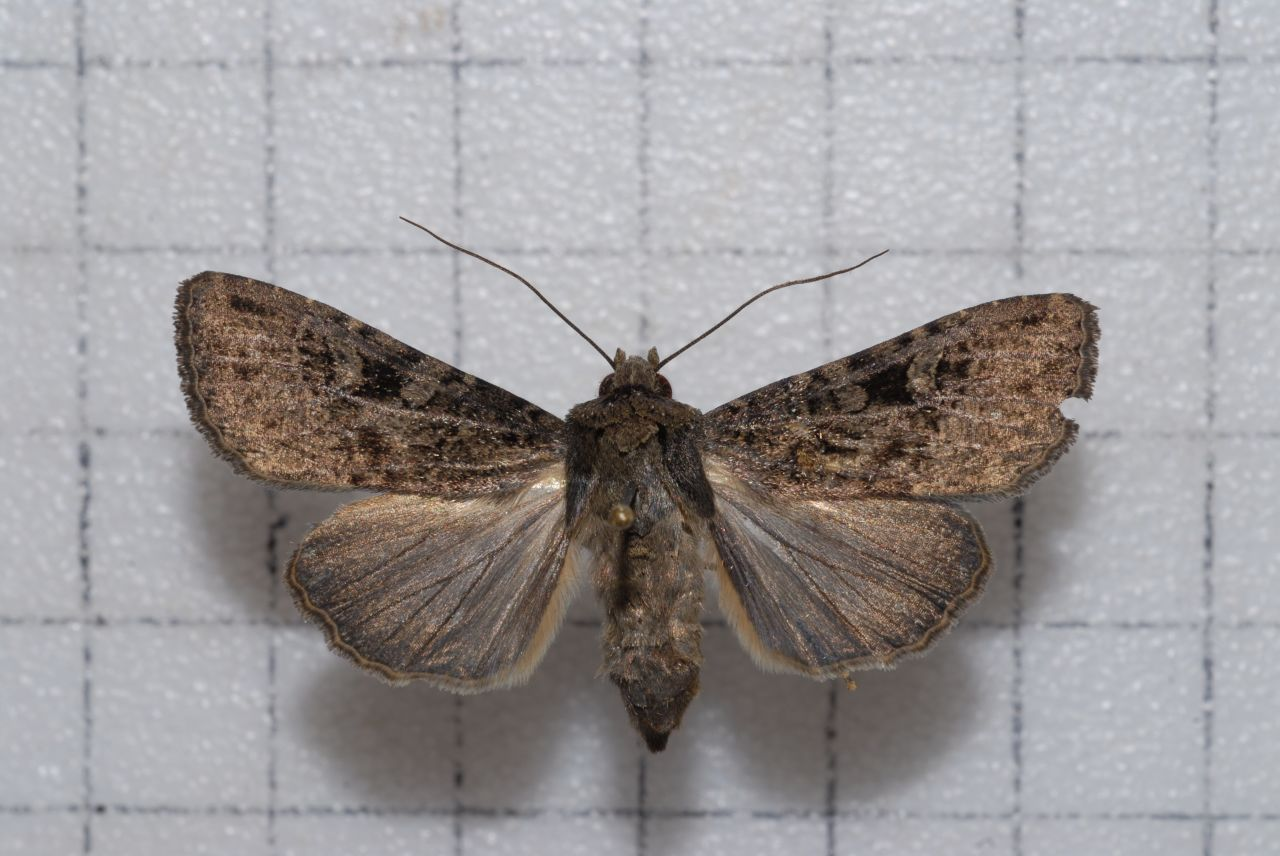

Scientific classification
- Domain: Eukaryota
- Kingdom: Animalia
- Phylum: Arthropoda
- Class: Insecta
- Order: Lepidoptera
- Superfamily: Noctuoidea
- Family: Noctuidae
- Tribe: Hadenini
- Genus: Apospasta; D. S. Fletcher, 1959

= Apospasta =

Genus of moths

Apospasta is a genus of moths of the family Noctuidae.

== Species ==
- Apospasta aethalopa D. S. Fletcher, 1961
- Apospasta albirenalis (Laporte, 1974)
- Apospasta ancillottoi Berio, 1978
- Apospasta cailloisi Laporte, 1984
- Apospasta claudicans (Guenée, 1852)
- Apospasta deprivata (Prout, 1927)
- Apospasta diffusa (Laporte, 1974)
- Apospasta dipterigidia (Hampson, 1902)
- Apospasta erici Laporte, 1984
- Apospasta eriopygioides (Aurivillius, 1910)
- Apospasta fuscirufa (Hampson, 1905)
- Apospasta incongrua (Laporte, 1974)
- Apospasta intricata (Saalmüller, 1891)
- Apospasta iodea (Rothschild, 1920)
- Apospasta jacksoni D. S. Fletcher, 1961
- Apospasta kennedyi D. S. Fletcher, 1961
- Apospasta luminosa (Wileman & South, 1920)
- Apospasta maryamae Laporte, 1984
- Apospasta montana (Aurivillius, 1910)
- Apospasta niger Laporte, 1984
- Apospasta nigerrima (Laporte, 1973)
- Apospasta nyei (Holloway, 1976)
- Apospasta pannosa (Moore, 1881)
- Apospasta rantaizanensis (Wileman, 1915)
- Apospasta rhodina D. S. Fletcher, 1961
- Apospasta rougeoti (Laporte, 1974)
- Apospasta rubiana (Guenée, 1862)
- Apospasta ruffoi Berio, 1978
- Apospasta sabulosa D. S. Fletcher, 1959
- Apospasta sikkima (Moore, 1882)
- Apospasta stigma (Joicey & Talbot, 1915)
- Apospasta synclera D. S. Fletcher, 1961
- Apospasta townsendi D. S. Fletcher, 1961
- Apospasta venata (Hampson, 1905)
- Apospasta verini (Viette, 1981)
