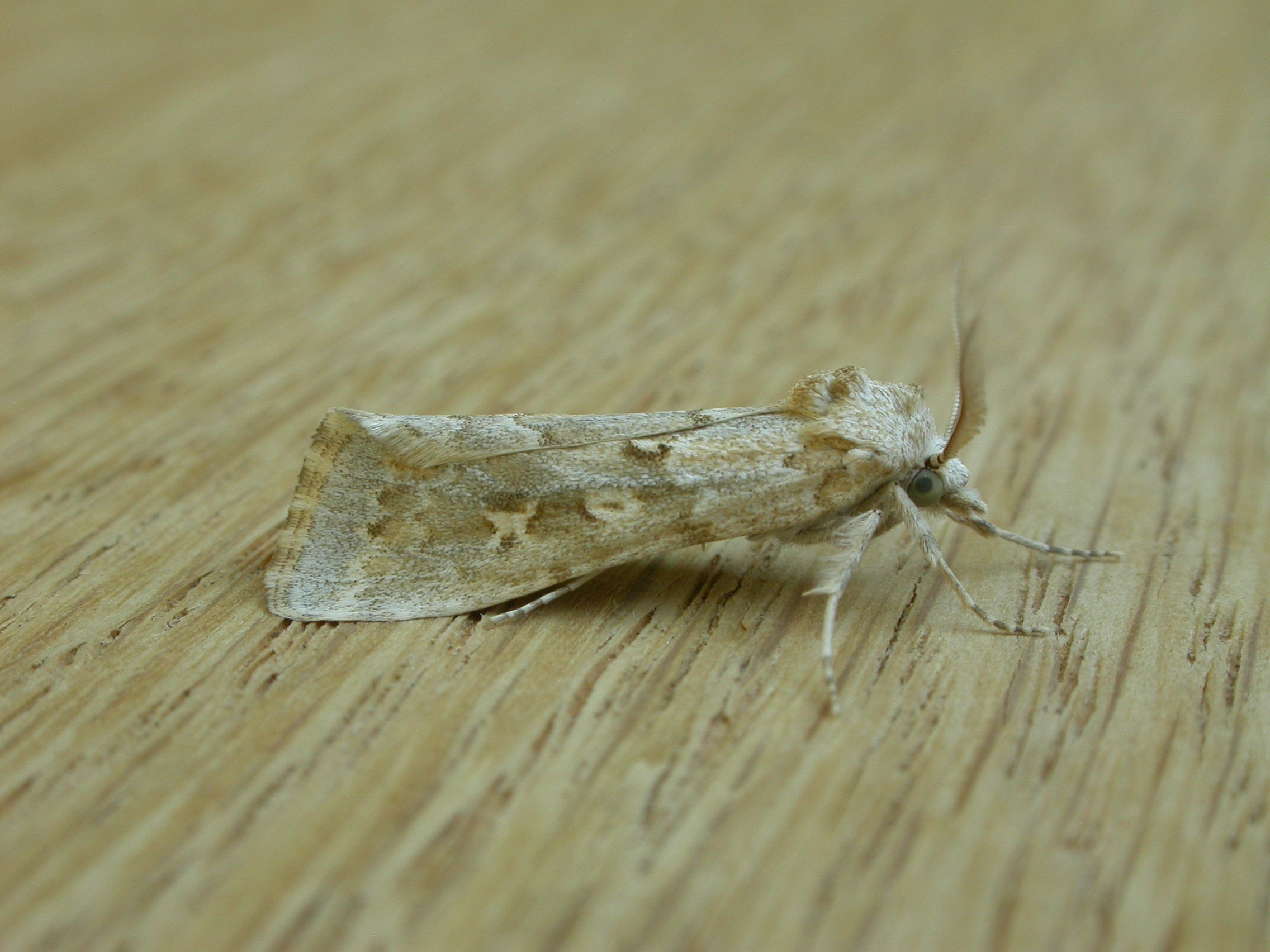

Scientific classification
- Domain: Eukaryota
- Kingdom: Animalia
- Phylum: Arthropoda
- Class: Insecta
- Order: Lepidoptera
- Superfamily: Noctuoidea
- Family: Noctuidae
- Genus: Eremochroa
- Species: E. alphitias

Binomial name
- Eremochroa alphitias Meyrick, 1897

= Eremochroa alphitias =

Species of moth

Eremochroa alphitias is a moth of the family Noctuidae. It is found in the Australian Capital Territory, New South Wales, the Northern Territory, Queensland, South Australia and Victoria.

The wingspan is about 20 mm. Adults have pale brown patterned forewings and even paler hindwings.
