= Leucapamea =

Scientific classification
- Kingdom: Animalia
- Phylum: Arthropoda
- Clade: Pancrustacea
- Class: Insecta
- Order: Lepidoptera
- Superfamily: Noctuoidea
- Family: Noctuidae
- Genus: Leucapamea; Sugi, 1982

Genus of moths

Leucapamea is a genus of moths of the family Noctuidae.

== Species ==
- Leucapamea askoldis (Oberthür, 1880)
- Leucapamea chienmingfui Ronkay & Ronkay, 1999
- Leucapamea formosensis (Hampson, 1910)
- Leucapamea hikosana (Sugi, 1958)
- Leucapamea kawadai (Sugi, 1955)
- Leucapamea kyushuensis (Sugi, 1958)
- Leucapamea tsueyluana Chang, 1991
