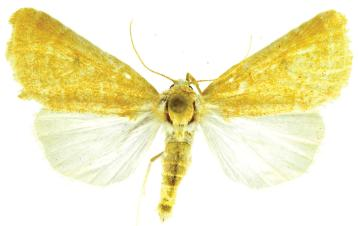
- Male
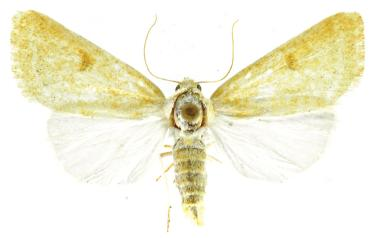
- Female

Scientific classification
- Kingdom: Animalia
- Phylum: Arthropoda
- Class: Insecta
- Order: Lepidoptera
- Superfamily: Noctuoidea
- Family: Noctuidae
- Subfamily: Hadeninae
- Genus: Trichocosmia; Grote, 1883
- Species: T. inornata

Binomial name
- Trichocosmia inornata Grote, 1883

Synonyms
- Trichocosmia demacula Strand, 1912 (form); Caradrina drasteroides Smith, 1903; Trichocosmia drasteroides

= Trichocosmia =

Genus of moths

Trichocosmia is a genus of moths of the family Noctuidae. It contains only one species, Trichocosmia inornata, which is found from Texas to California, north to Utah.
