= Xanthiria =

Scientific classification
- Kingdom: Animalia
- Phylum: Arthropoda
- Clade: Pancrustacea
- Class: Insecta
- Order: Lepidoptera
- Superfamily: Noctuoidea
- Family: Noctuidae
- Genus: Xanthiria; Hampson, 1908

Genus of moths

Xanthiria is a genus of moths of the family Noctuidae.

== Species ==
- Xanthiria primulina (Druce, 1889)
