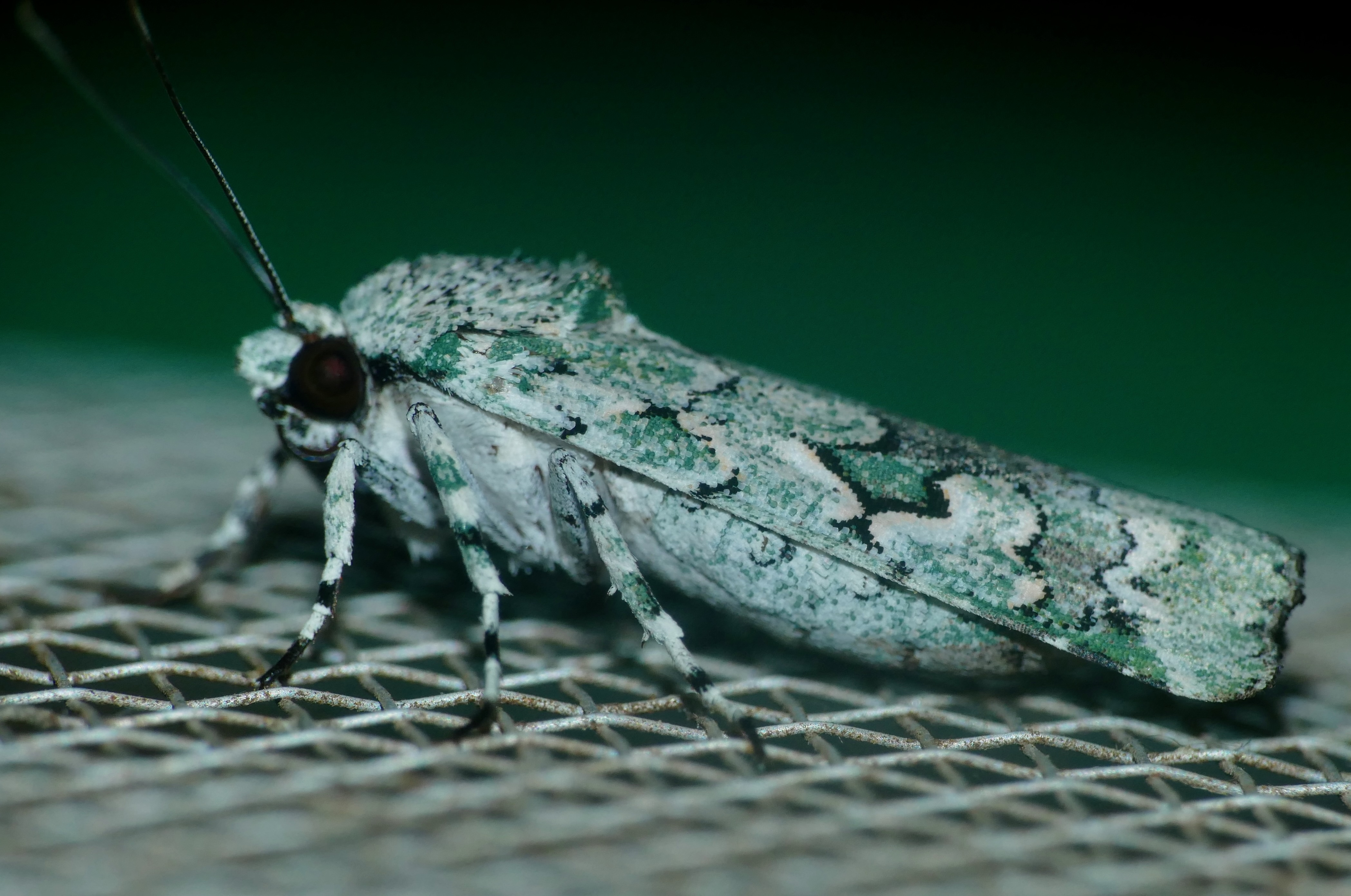
- Ethioterpia lichenea

Scientific classification
- Kingdom: Animalia
- Phylum: Arthropoda
- Class: Insecta
- Order: Lepidoptera
- Superfamily: Noctuoidea
- Family: Noctuidae
- Subfamily: Noctuinae
- Genus: Ethioterpia; Hampson, 1910

Type species
- Ethioterpia neavi Hampson, 1910

Species
- Ethioterpia janenschi Gaede; Ethioterpia lichenea Janse, 1940; Ethioterpia marmorata Janse, 1940; Ethioterpia neavi Hampson, 1910; Ethioterpia toulgoeti Viette, 1961

= Ethioterpia =

Genus of moths

Ethioterpia is a genus of moths of the family Noctuidae found in southeast Africa.
