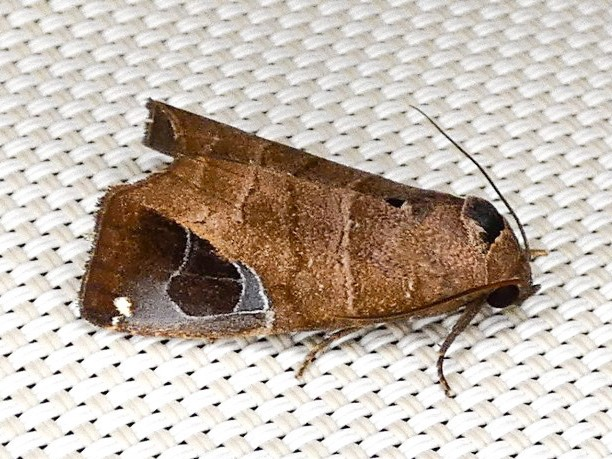
- Closteromorpha modesta

Scientific classification
- Kingdom: Animalia
- Phylum: Arthropoda
- Clade: Pancrustacea
- Class: Insecta
- Order: Lepidoptera
- Superfamily: Noctuoidea
- Family: Noctuidae
- Genus: Closteromorpha; Felder, 1874

= Closteromorpha =

Genus of moths

Closteromorpha is a genus of moths in the family Noctuidae.
