= Tridepia =

Scientific classification
- Domain: Eukaryota
- Kingdom: Animalia
- Phylum: Arthropoda
- Class: Insecta
- Order: Lepidoptera
- Superfamily: Noctuoidea
- Family: Noctuidae
- Genus: Tridepia; McDunnough, 1937

Genus of moths

Tridepia is a genus of moths of the family Noctuidae.

== Species ==
- Tridepia nova (Smith, 1903)
