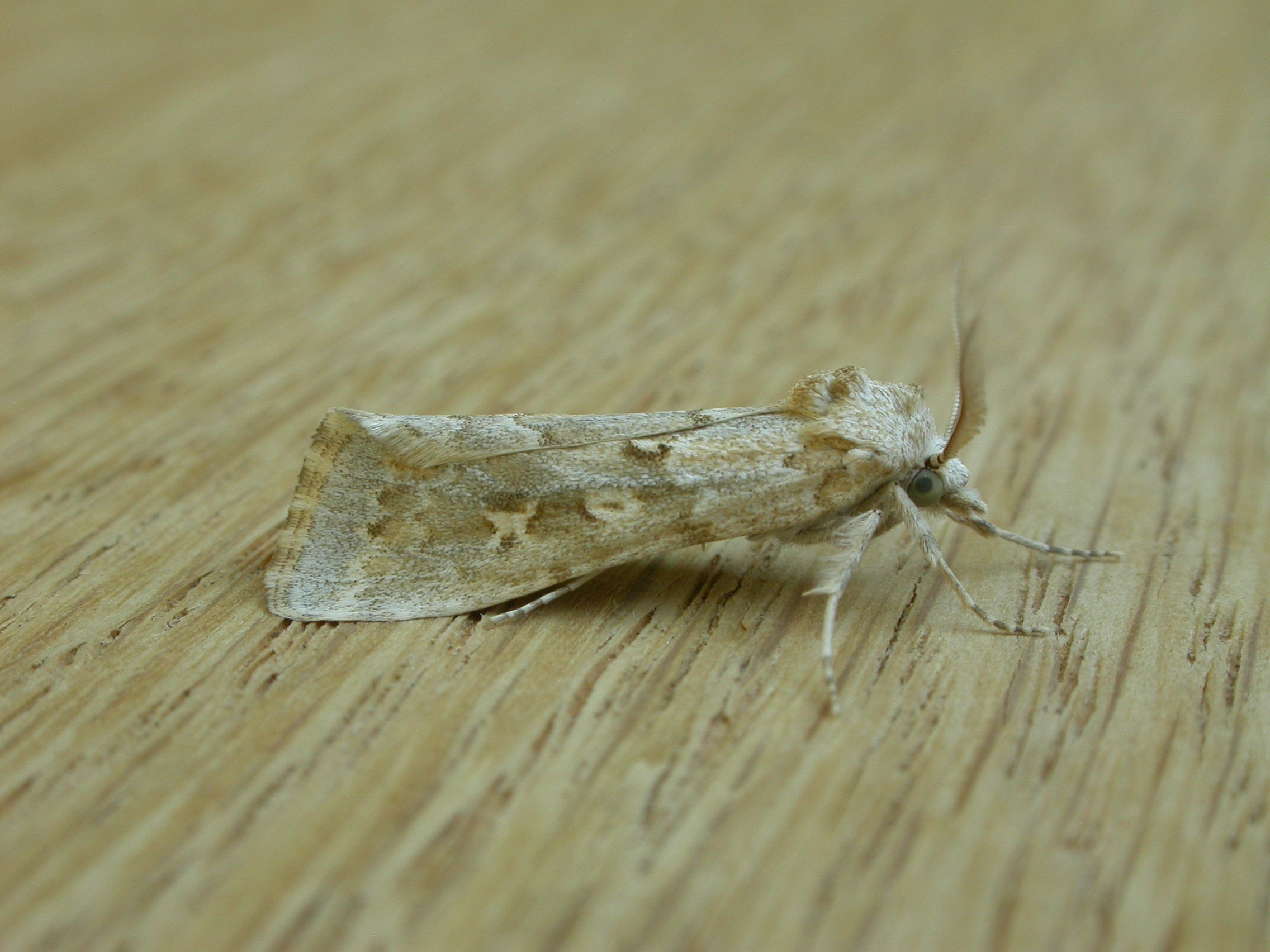
- Eremochroa alphitias

Scientific classification
- Kingdom: Animalia
- Phylum: Arthropoda
- Class: Insecta
- Order: Lepidoptera
- Superfamily: Noctuoidea
- Family: Noctuidae
- Subfamily: Noctuinae
- Genus: Eremochroa; Meyrick, 1897

= Eremochroa =

Genus of moths

Eremochroa is a genus of moths of the family Noctuidae.

== Species ==
- Eremochroa alphitias Meyrick, 1897 (Australia)
- Eremochroa lunata (Lower, 1903)
- Eremochroa macropa (Lower, 1897)
- Eremochroa paradesma Lower, 1902 (Australia)
- Eremochroa psammias Meyrick, 1897 (Australia)
- Eremochroa thermidora Hampson, 1909
