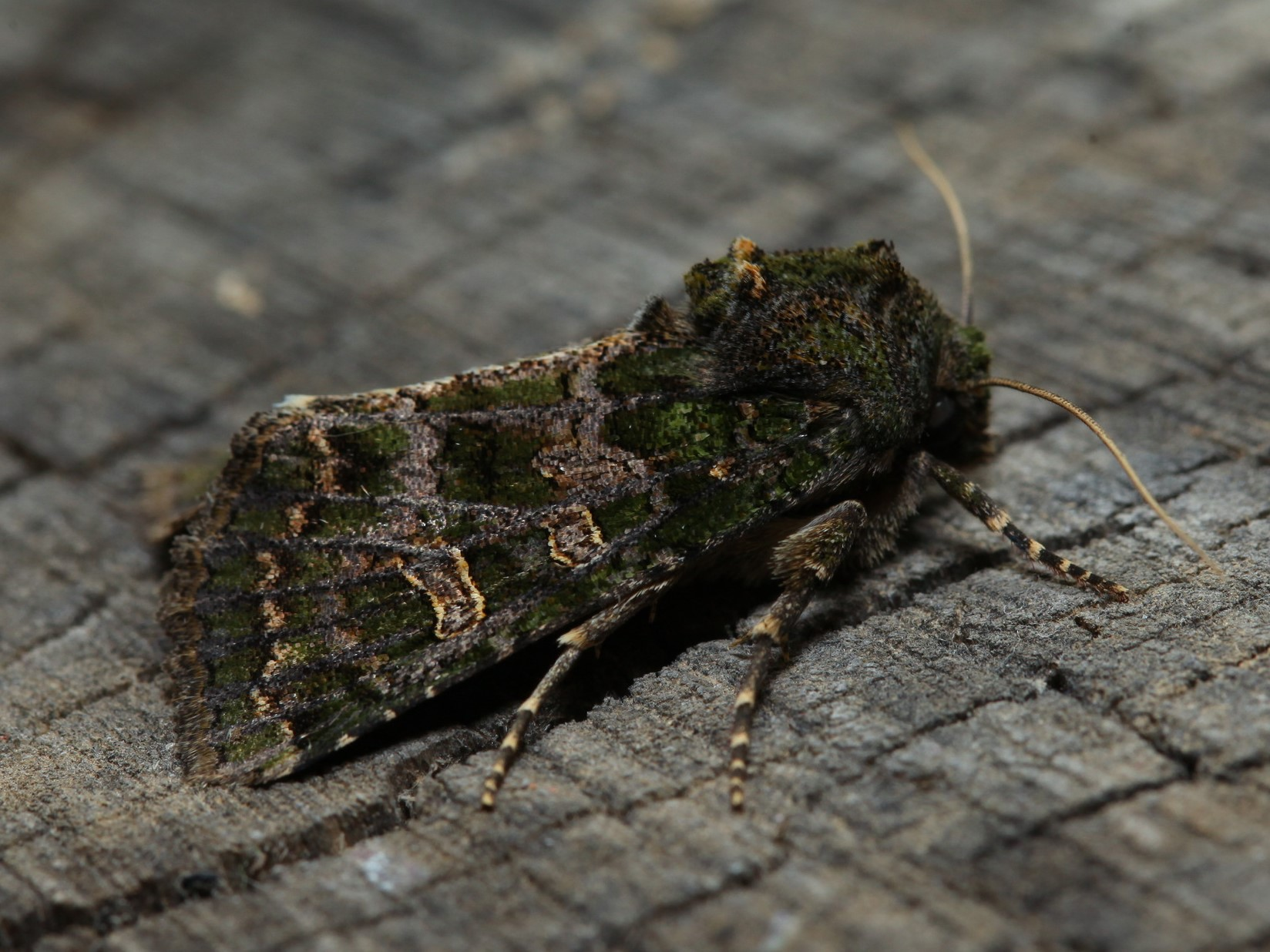
- Sidemia spilogramma

Scientific classification
- Kingdom: Animalia
- Phylum: Arthropoda
- Class: Insecta
- Order: Lepidoptera
- Superfamily: Noctuoidea
- Family: Noctuidae
- Genus: Sidemia; Staudinger, 1892

= Sidemia =

Genus of moths

Sidemia is a genus of moths in the family Noctuidae.

== Species ==
- Sidemia beduina Wiltshire, 1948
- Sidemia bremeri (Ershov, 1870)
- Sidemia dimorpha Rungs, 1950
- Sidemia judaica (Staudinger, 1897)
- Sidemia plebeja (Staudinger, 1888)
- Sidemia spilogramma (Rambur, 1871)
- Sidemia spodopterodes Hampson, 1908
