= Tycomarptes =

Scientific classification
- Kingdom: Animalia
- Phylum: Arthropoda
- Class: Insecta
- Order: Lepidoptera
- Superfamily: Noctuoidea
- Family: Noctuidae
- Genus: Tycomarptes; D. S. Fletcher, 1961

Type species
- Apamea inferior Guenée, 1852

Genus of moths

Tycomarptes is a genus of moths of the family Noctuidae. It was described by David Stephen Fletcher in 1961.
