= Saalmuellerana =

Scientific classification
- Kingdom: Animalia
- Phylum: Arthropoda
- Class: Insecta
- Order: Lepidoptera
- Superfamily: Noctuoidea
- Family: Noctuidae
- Genus: Saalmuellerana; D. S. Fletcher & Viette, 1962

Genus of moths

Saalmuellerana is a genus of moths of the family Noctuidae The genus was erected by David Stephen Fletcher and Pierre Viette in 1962. It was later described by David Stephen Fletcher and Pierre Viette in 1962.

== Species ==
- Saalmuellerana glebosa (Saalmüller, 1891)
- Saalmuellerana illota Viette, 1973
- Saalmuellerana media (Walker, 1857)
- Saalmuellerana rufimixta (Hampson, 1918)
- Saalmuellerana schoenheiti (Strand, 1912)
