= Escaria =

Scientific classification
- Kingdom: Animalia
- Phylum: Arthropoda
- Class: Insecta
- Order: Lepidoptera
- Superfamily: Noctuoidea
- Family: Noctuidae
- Genus: Escaria; Grote, 1882

Genus of moths

Escaria is a genus of moths of the family Noctuidae.

== Species ==
- Escaria clauda Grote, 1883
- Escaria homogena McDunnough, 1922
