= Sajania =

Scientific classification
- Domain: Eukaryota
- Kingdom: Animalia
- Phylum: Arthropoda
- Class: Insecta
- Order: Lepidoptera
- Superfamily: Noctuoidea
- Family: Noctuidae
- Genus: Sajania

Genus of moths

Sajania is a genus of moths of the family Noctuidae described by Igor Vasilievich Kozhanchikov in 1947. It comprises only one known species.
