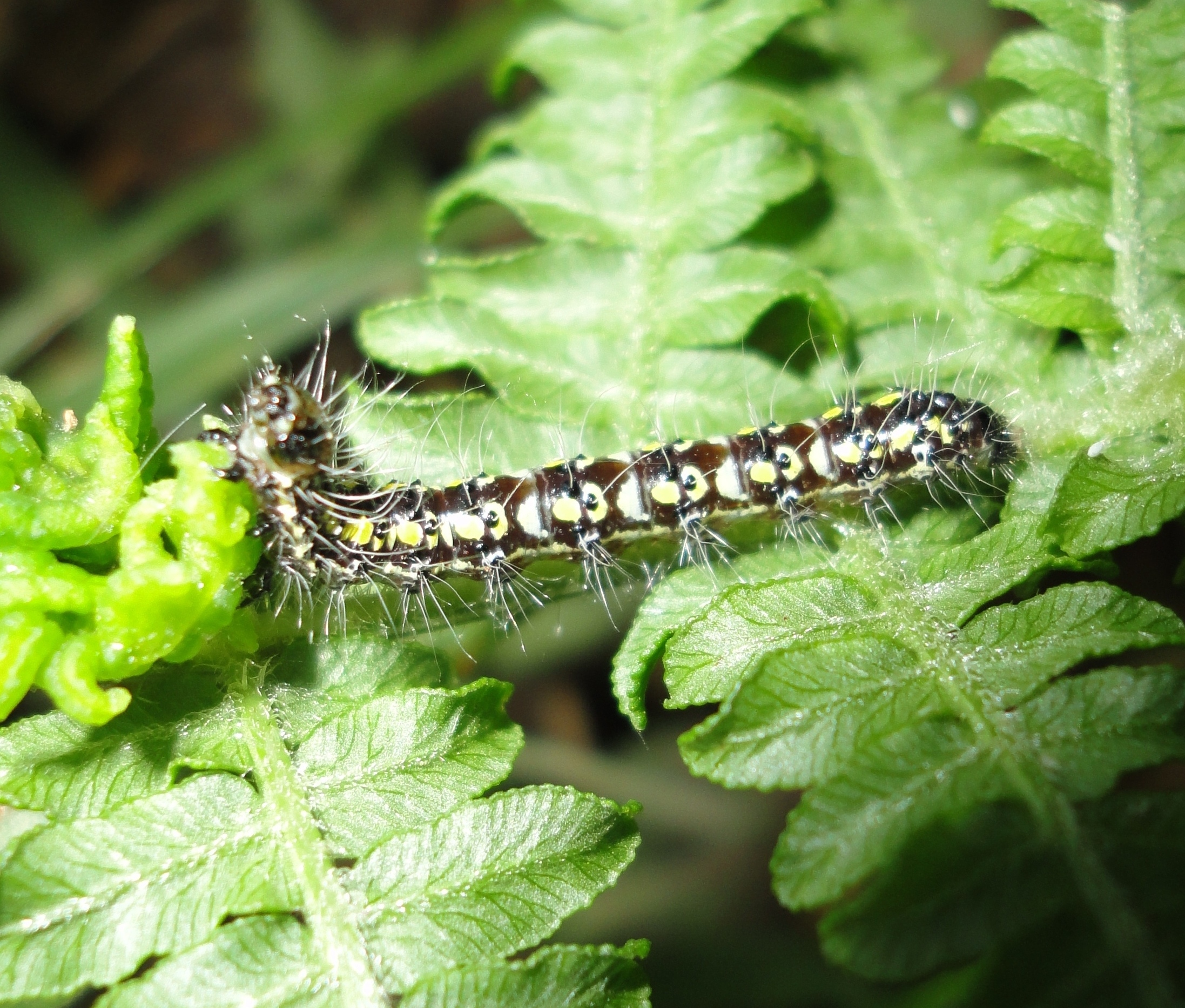
- Caterpillar tentatively identified as Nyodes

Scientific classification
- Kingdom: Animalia
- Phylum: Arthropoda
- Class: Insecta
- Order: Lepidoptera
- Superfamily: Noctuoidea
- Family: Noctuidae
- Genus: Nyodes; Laporte, 1970

Type species
- Xanthia brevicornis Walker, 1856

Synonyms
- Elaeodes Hampson, 1913 (repl.)

= Nyodes =

Genus of moths

Nyodes is a genus of moths of the family Noctuidae described by Bernard Laporte in 1970. Most species occur in Africa.

Some species of this genus are:

- Nyodes acatharta Hampson, 1913
- Nyodes argentea (Berio, 1970)
- Nyodes auriferoides Laporte, 1972
- Nyodes aurora Laporte, 1972
- Nyodes bafouti Laporte, 1972
- Nyodes barlowi Laporte, 1972
- Nyodes barnsi (A. E. Prout, 1921)
- Nyodes basilewskyi Laporte, 1972
- Nyodes bergeri Laporte, 1973
- Nyodes bernardii Laporte, 1970
- Nyodes biardi Laporte, 1984
- Nyodes brevicornis (Walker, 1857)
- Nyodes bryodes (D. S. Fletcher, 1961)
- Nyodes callichlora (D. S. Fletcher, 1961)
- Nyodes chlorobapta (D. S. Fletcher, 1961)
- Nyodes dargei Laporte, 1972
- Nyodes diffusa Laporte, 1973
- Nyodes dufayi Laporte, 1970
- Nyodes fletcheri Laporte, 1970
- Nyodes gabonensis Laporte, 1970
- Nyodes gazelli Laporte, 1973
- Nyodes hecqui Laporte, 1972
- Nyodes herbuloti Laporte, 1973
- Nyodes isabellae Laporte, 1971
- Nyodes jucunda Laporte, 1973
- Nyodes kilimandjaronis Laporte, 1979
- Nyodes lemairei Laporte, 1972
- Nyodes lowai Laporte, 1973
- Nyodes lutescens (Herrich-Schäffer, 1854)
- Nyodes makokoui Laporte, 1970
- Nyodes marginata Laporte, 1977
- Nyodes mariae Laporte, 1972
- Nyodes marmorata (Berio, 1970)
- Nyodes mochlosema (D. S. Fletcher, 1961)
- Nyodes nigriodes Laporte, 1977
- Nyodes njombei Laporte, 1972
- Nyodes ochrargyra (Mabille, 1900)
- Nyodes panconita (D. S. Fletcher, 1961)
- Nyodes paulis Laporte, 1973
- Nyodes pelletieri Laporte, 1971
- Nyodes petersi Laporte, 1971
- Nyodes prasinodes (A. E. Prout, 1921)
- Nyodes punctata (Gaede, 1934)
- Nyodes punctatoides Laporte, 1973
- Nyodes punctifera Laporte, 1973
- Nyodes rufifusa (Hampson, 1918)
- Nyodes rufifusoides Laporte, 1973
- Nyodes sandersi Laporte, 1972
- Nyodes semliki Laporte, 1971
- Nyodes sophiae Laporte, 1970
- Nyodes steeli Laporte, 1971
- Nyodes subfuscata (Berio, 1970)
- Nyodes sublutescens Laporte, 1972
- Nyodes subnigra Laporte, 1973
- Nyodes succincta Berio, 1973
- Nyodes suppurifera (Berio, 1970)
- Nyodes tamsi Laporte, 1973
- Nyodes thomae (A. E. Prout, 1927)
- Nyodes toucheti Laporte, 1973
- Nyodes viettei Laporte, 1970
- Nyodes vigrinis Laporte, 1970
- Nyodes virescens (Butler, 1879)
- Nyodes viridirufa (Hampson, 1918)
- Nyodes vitanvali Laporte, 1970
