= Haderonia =

Scientific classification
- Domain: Eukaryota
- Kingdom: Animalia
- Phylum: Arthropoda
- Class: Insecta
- Order: Lepidoptera
- Superfamily: Noctuoidea
- Family: Noctuidae
- Genus: Haderonia; Staudinger, 1896

Genus of moths

Haderonia is a genus of moths of the family Noctuidae.

== Species ==
- Haderonia alpina (Draudt, 1950)
- Haderonia aplectoides (Draudt, 1950)
- Haderonia arschanica (Alphéraky, 1882)
- Haderonia chinensis (Draudt, 1950)
- Haderonia contempta (Püngeler, 1914)
- Haderonia iomelas (Draudt, 1950)
- Haderonia khorgossi (Alphéraky, 1882)
- Haderonia lasiestrina (Draudt, 1950)
- Haderonia longicornis (Graeser, 1892)
- Haderonia lupa (Christoph, 1893)
- Haderonia nefasta (Püngeler, 1907)
- Haderonia optima Alphéraky, 1897
- Haderonia persimilis (Draudt, 1950)
- Haderonia proximoides Wiltshire, 1982
- Haderonia subarschanica (Staudinger, 1895)
- Haderonia tancrei (Graeser, 1892)
- Haderonia thermolimna Boursin, 1964
- Haderonia turpis (Staudinger, 1900)
- Haderonia zetina (Staudinger, 1900)
