= Conicofrontia =

Scientific classification
- Kingdom: Animalia
- Phylum: Arthropoda
- Class: Insecta
- Order: Lepidoptera
- Superfamily: Noctuoidea
- Family: Noctuidae
- Genus: Conicofrontia; Hampson, 1902

Genus of moths

Conicofrontia is a genus of moths of the family Noctuidae.

== Species ==
- Conicofrontia dallolmoi Berio, 1973
- Conicofrontia diamesa (Hampson, 1920)
- Conicofrontia sesamoides Hampson, 1902
