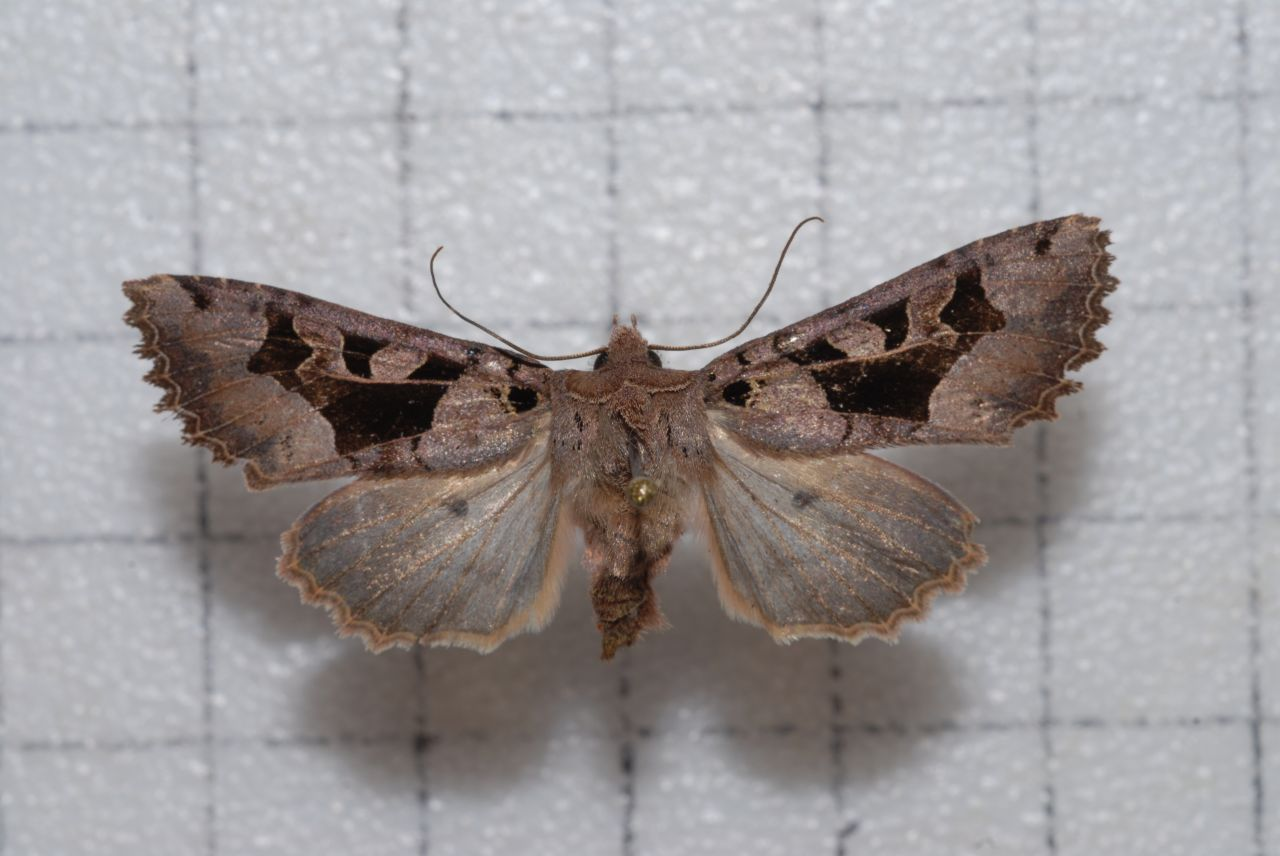
- Clavipalpula aurariae

Scientific classification
- Domain: Eukaryota
- Kingdom: Animalia
- Phylum: Arthropoda
- Class: Insecta
- Order: Lepidoptera
- Superfamily: Noctuoidea
- Family: Noctuidae
- Genus: Clavipalpula; Staudinger, 1892

= Clavipalpula =

Genus of moths

Clavipalpula is a genus of moths of the family Noctuidae.

== Species ==
- Clavipalpula alboradiata Köhler, 1947
- Clavipalpula aurariae (Oberthür, 1880)
