= Trudestra =

Scientific classification
- Kingdom: Animalia
- Phylum: Arthropoda
- Class: Insecta
- Order: Lepidoptera
- Superfamily: Noctuoidea
- Family: Noctuidae
- Genus: Trudestra; McDunnough, 1937

Genus of moths

Trudestra is a genus of moths of the family Noctuidae.

== Species ==
- Trudestra hadeniformis (Smith, 1894)
