= Thargelia (moth) =

Scientific classification
- Domain: Eukaryota
- Kingdom: Animalia
- Phylum: Arthropoda
- Class: Insecta
- Order: Lepidoptera
- Superfamily: Noctuoidea
- Family: Noctuidae
- Genus: Thargiela

Genus of moths

Thargelia is a genus of moths of the family Noctuidae.

== Species ==
- Thargelia attila L.Ronkay & Gyulai, 2006
- Thargelia balazsi L.Ronkay & Gyulai, 2006
