= Euterpiodes =

Scientific classification
- Kingdom: Animalia
- Phylum: Arthropoda
- Clade: Pancrustacea
- Class: Insecta
- Order: Lepidoptera
- Superfamily: Noctuoidea
- Family: Noctuidae
- Subfamily: Noctuinae
- Genus: Euterpiodes; Hampson, 1908

Type species
- Euterpiodes pienaari Distant, 1898

Genus of moths

Euterpiodes is a genus of moths in the family Noctuidae.
