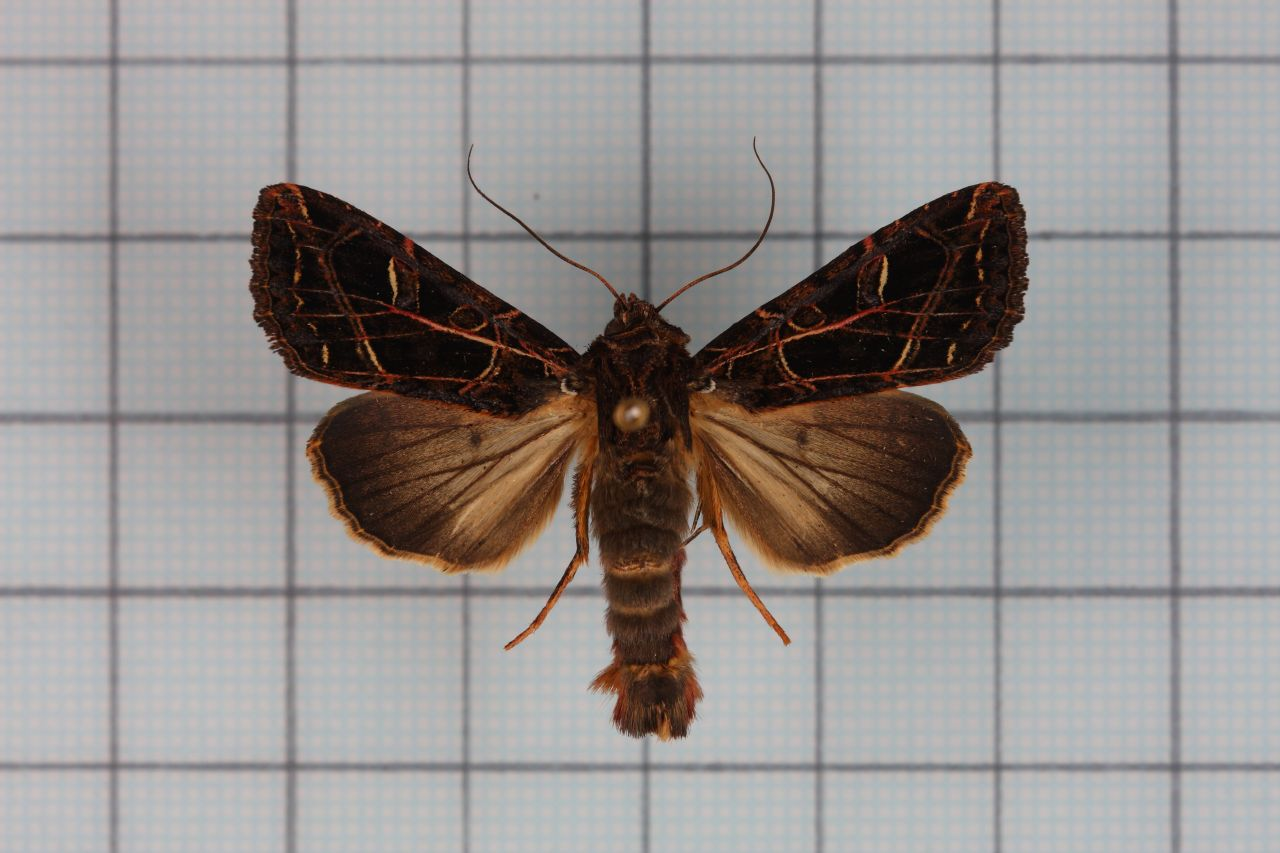

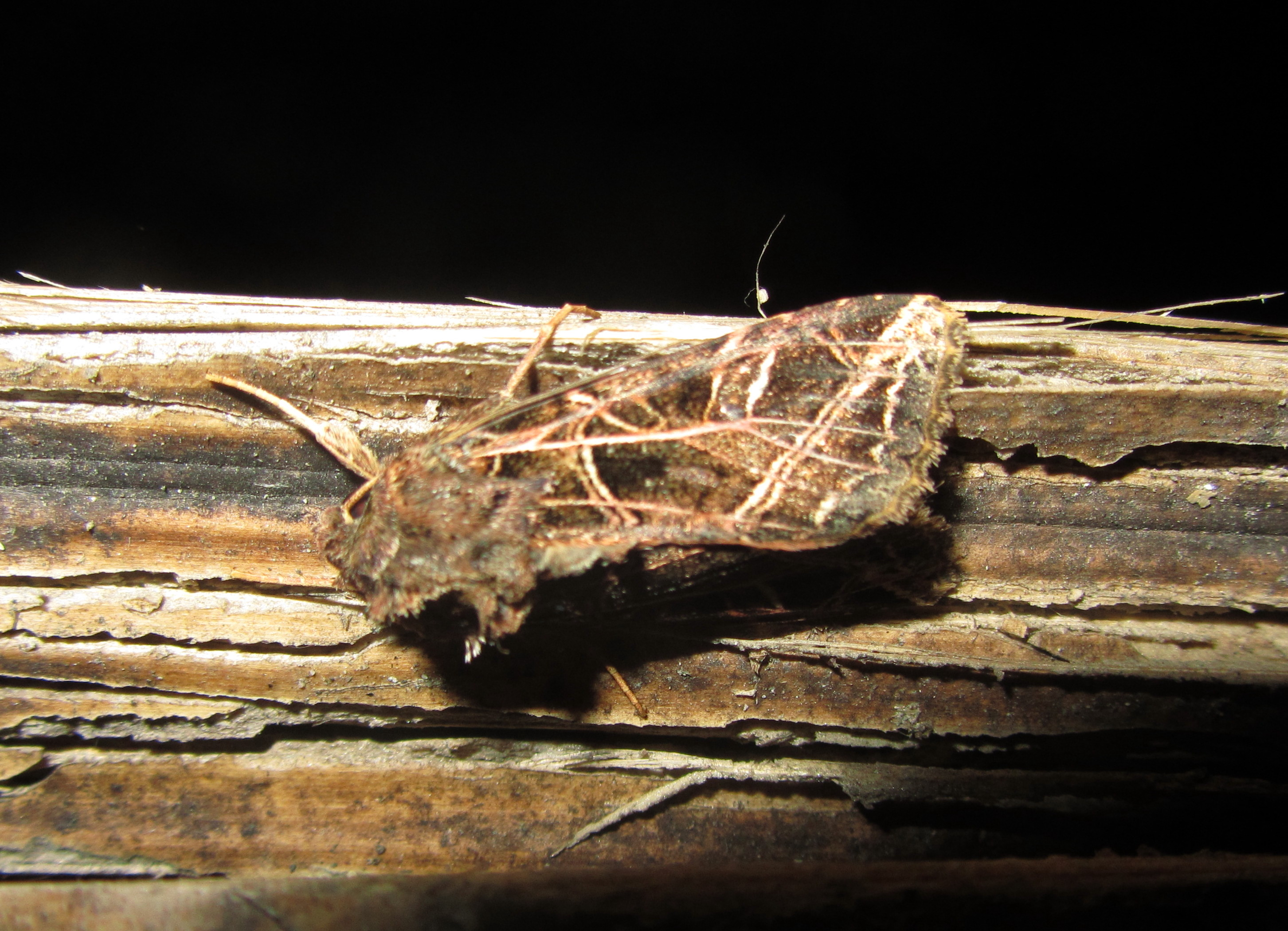

Scientific classification
- Kingdom: Animalia
- Phylum: Arthropoda
- Clade: Pancrustacea
- Class: Insecta
- Order: Lepidoptera
- Superfamily: Noctuoidea
- Family: Noctuidae
- Genus: Dictyestra; Sugi, 1982
- Species: D. dissectus

Binomial name
- Dictyestra dissectus (Walker, 1865)

Synonyms
- Heliophobus dissectus Walker, 1865; Dictyestra dissecta; Mamestra crucifer Felder & Rogenhofer, 1875; Dictyestra crucifer

= Dictyestra =

Angle network armyworm

Genus of moths

Dictyestra is a monotypic moth genus of the family Noctuidae erected by Shigero Sugi in 1982. It contains only one species, Dictyestra dissectus, the angle network armyworm, first described by Francis Walker in 1865. It is found from India to Indochina, Sri Lanka, China, Japan, Sundaland and the Philippines and from Sulawesi to the Moluccas and New Guinea.

== Description ==
Its wingspan is about 45 mm. The forewings are long and narrow. Antennae of male minutely ciliated. Head and thorax dark brown. Abdomen fuscous with pale extremity. Forewings are dark brown with ochreous veins. Sub-basal, antemedial and postmedial double lines are ochreous, where the second curved and last angled beyond the cell and met by a streak from apex. There is an ochreous doubly-curved submarginal line present. Hindwings are fuscous brown.
