= Odontestra =

Scientific classification
- Kingdom: Animalia
- Phylum: Arthropoda
- Class: Insecta
- Order: Lepidoptera
- Superfamily: Noctuoidea
- Family: Noctuidae
- Genus: Odontestra; Hampson, 1905

Genus of moths

Odontestra is a genus of moths of the family Noctuidae.

== Species ==
- Odontestra albivitta Hampson, 1905
- Odontestra altidudinis Laporte, 1973
- Odontestra atuntseana Draudt, 1950
- Odontestra avitta Fawcett, 1917
- Odontestra balachowskyi Laporte, 1974
- Odontestra conformis Hampson, 1918
- Odontestra ferox Berio, 1973
- Odontestra goniosema Hampson, 1913
- Odontestra malgassica Viette, 1969
- Odontestra potanini (Alphéraky, 1895)
- Odontestra pseudosubgothica Berio, 1964
- Odontestra richinii Berio, 1940
- Odontestra roseomarginata Draudt, 1950
- Odontestra simillima (Moore, 181)
- Odontestra submarginalis (Walker, 1869)
- Odontestra unguiculata Berio, 1964
- Odontestra variegata Berio, 1940
- Odontestra vitta Berio, 1974
- Odontestra vittigera (Hampson, 1902)
