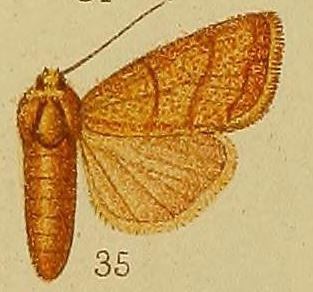
- Chabuata rufilinea

Scientific classification
- Kingdom: Animalia
- Phylum: Arthropoda
- Class: Insecta
- Order: Lepidoptera
- Superfamily: Noctuoidea
- Family: Noctuidae
- Genus: Chabuata; Walker, 1858

= Chabuata =

Genus of moths

Chabuata is a genus of moths of the family Noctuidae.

== Species ==
This genus presently contains 2 species:

- Chabuata amoeba Hampson, 1905 (from Kenya)
- Chabuata rufilinea Hampson, 1910 (from Zambia)
