= Brithysana =

Scientific classification
- Kingdom: Animalia
- Phylum: Arthropoda
- Class: Insecta
- Order: Lepidoptera
- Superfamily: Noctuoidea
- Family: Noctuidae
- Genus: Brithysana; Viette, 1963

Genus of moths

Brithysana is a genus of moths of the family Noctuidae.

== Species ==
- Brithysana africana Laporte, 1973
- Brithysana maura (Saalmüller, 1891)
- Brithysana pauliani Viette, 1967
- Brithysana speyeri (Felder & Rogenhofer, 1874)
