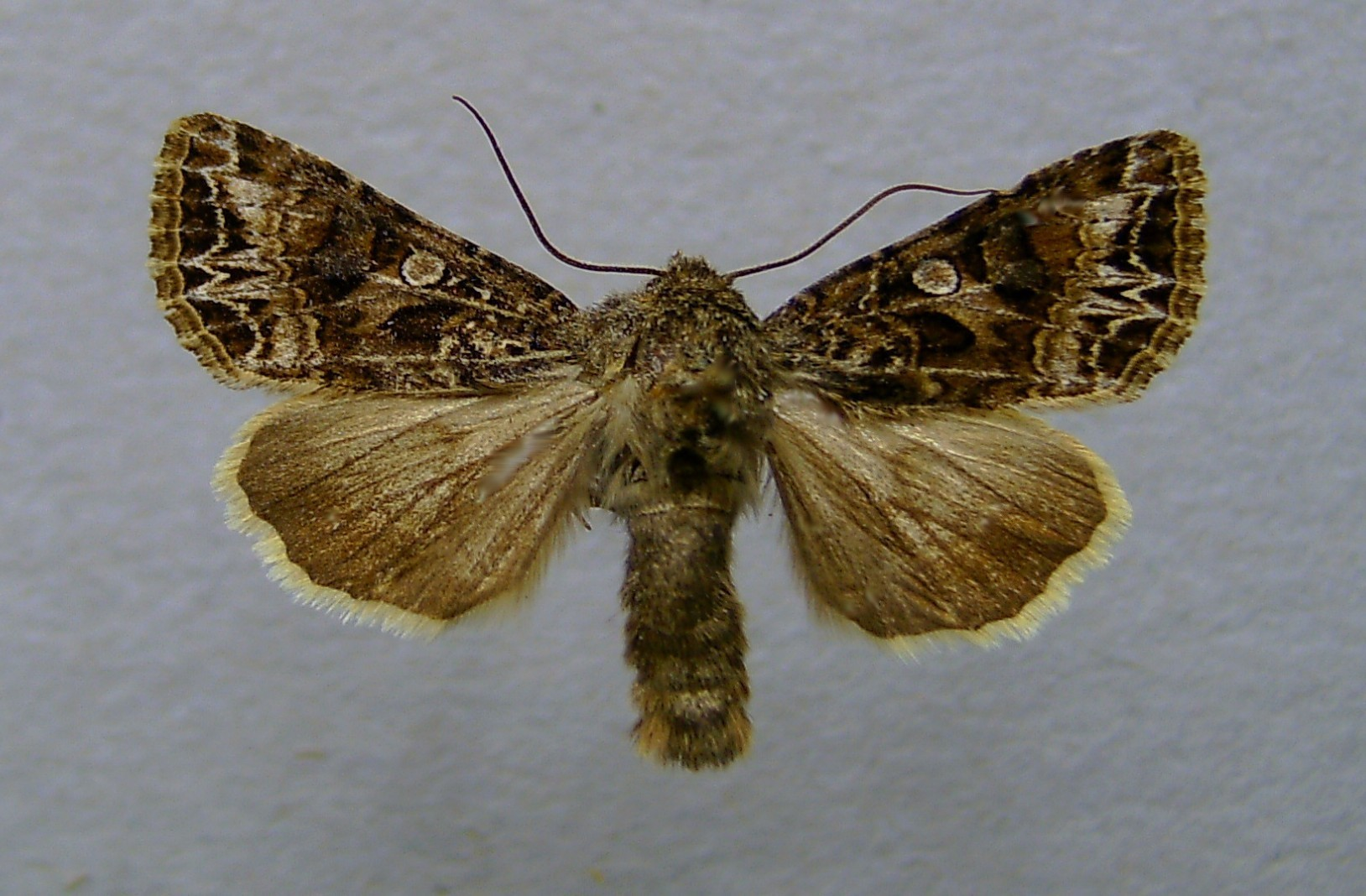
- Discestra

Scientific classification
- Kingdom: Animalia
- Phylum: Arthropoda
- Class: Insecta
- Order: Lepidoptera
- Superfamily: Noctuoidea
- Family: Noctuidae
- Genus: Discestra; Hampson

= Discestra =

Genus of moths

Discestra is a genus of moths of the family Noctuidae. It is considered a synonym of Anarta and is likely invalid.
