= Sapporia =

Scientific classification
- Kingdom: Animalia
- Phylum: Arthropoda
- Clade: Pancrustacea
- Class: Insecta
- Order: Lepidoptera
- Superfamily: Noctuoidea
- Family: Noctuidae
- Genus: Sapporia; Sugi, 1982

Genus of moths

Sapporia is a genus of moths of the family Noctuidae.

== Species ==
- Sapporia fasciculata (Leech, 1900)
- Sapporia repetita (Butler, 1885)
