= Scriptania =

Scientific classification
- Kingdom: Animalia
- Phylum: Arthropoda
- Class: Insecta
- Order: Lepidoptera
- Superfamily: Noctuoidea
- Family: Noctuidae
- Genus: Scriptania; Hampson, 1905

Genus of moths

Scriptania is a genus of moths of the family Noctuidae.

== Species ==
- Scriptania americana (Blanchard, 1852)
- Scriptania michaelseni
- Scriptania nordenskjoldi
