= Capillamentum =

Scientific classification
- Domain: Eukaryota
- Kingdom: Animalia
- Phylum: Arthropoda
- Class: Insecta
- Order: Lepidoptera
- Superfamily: Noctuoidea
- Family: Noctuidae
- Genus: Capillamentum; Pinhey, 1956

Genus of moths

Capillamentum is a genus of moths of the family Noctuidae.

== Species ==
- Capillamentum galleyi Laporte, 1984
- Capillamentum nigrofasciatum Pinhey, 1956
