= Dimorphicosmia =

Scientific classification
- Kingdom: Animalia
- Phylum: Arthropoda
- Clade: Pancrustacea
- Class: Insecta
- Order: Lepidoptera
- Superfamily: Noctuoidea
- Family: Noctuidae
- Subfamily: Xyleninae
- Genus: Dimorphicosmia; Sugi, 1982

Genus of moths

Dimorphicosmia is a genus of moths of the family Noctuidae.

== Species ==
- Dimorphicosmia variegata (Oberthür, 1879)
