= Elyptron =

Scientific classification
- Kingdom: Animalia
- Phylum: Arthropoda
- Clade: Pancrustacea
- Class: Insecta
- Order: Lepidoptera
- Superfamily: Noctuoidea
- Family: Noctuidae
- Subfamily: Amphipyrinae
- Genus: Elyptron; Saalmüller, 1881

Synonyms
- Tegarpagon Berio, 1955

Genus of moths

Elyptron is a genus of moths of the family Noctuidae described by Saalmüller in 1881.

== Species ==
Some species of this genus are:

- Elyptron annularis Viette, 1963
- Elyptron berioi Viette, 1957
- Elyptron catalai Viette, 1963
- Elyptron cinctum Saalmüller, 1891
- Elyptron dallolmoi Berio, 1972
- Elyptron emplecta D. S. Fletcher, 1963
- Elyptron ethiopica Hampson, 1909
- Elyptron leucosticta Hampson, 1909
- Elyptron schroderi Viette, 1963
- Elyptron subleucosticta Strand, 1921
- Elyptron timorosa Berio, 1955
