= Anapoma =

Scientific classification
- Domain: Eukaryota
- Kingdom: Animalia
- Phylum: Arthropoda
- Class: Insecta
- Order: Lepidoptera
- Superfamily: Noctuoidea
- Family: Noctuidae
- Subfamily: Noctuinae
- Genus: Anapoma; Berio, 1980

Genus of moths

Anapoma is a genus of moths of the family Noctuidae.

== Species ==
- Anapoma albicosta (Moore, 1881)
- Anapoma albivenata (Swinhoe, 1890)
- Anapoma chapa Hreblay & Yoshimatsu, 1999
- Anapoma complicata Hreblay, 1999
- Anapoma coronilla (Berio, 1973)
- Anapoma decoronata Hreblay, 1996
- Anapoma duplicata (Butler, 1889)
- Anapoma himacola Hreblay & Legrain, 1999
- Anapoma hyphilarioides Hreblay & Yoshimatsu, 1996
- Anapoma martoni Yoshimatsu & Legrain, 2001
- Anapoma nigrilineosa (Moore, 1882)
- Anapoma pallidior (Draudt, 1950)
- Anapoma postica (Hampson, 1905)
- Anapoma replicata Hreblay & Yoshimatsu, 1999
- Anapoma riparia (Boisduval, 1829)
- Anapoma unicorna (Berio, 1973)
