= Mammifrontia =

Scientific classification
- Domain: Eukaryota
- Kingdom: Animalia
- Phylum: Arthropoda
- Class: Insecta
- Order: Lepidoptera
- Superfamily: Noctuoidea
- Family: Noctuidae
- Tribe: Apameini
- Genus: Mammifrontia; Barnes & Lindsey, 1922

Genus of moths

Mammifrontia is a genus of moths of the family Noctuidae erected by William Barnes and Arthur Ward Lindsey in 1922.

== Species ==
- Mammifrontia leucania Barnes & Benjamin, 1922
- Mammifrontia rileyi Benjamin, 1936
- Mammifrontia sarae Mustelin, 2006
