= Monostola =

Scientific classification
- Domain: Eukaryota
- Kingdom: Animalia
- Phylum: Arthropoda
- Class: Insecta
- Order: Lepidoptera
- Superfamily: Noctuoidea
- Family: Noctuidae
- Genus: Monostola; Alphéraky, 1892

Genus of moths

Monostola is a genus of moths of the family Noctuidae.

== Species ==
- Monostola asiatica Alphéraky, 1892
- Monostola infans (Hampson, 1905)
- Monostola pectinata (Alphéraky, 1892)
