= Ctenoceratoda =

Scientific classification
- Kingdom: Animalia
- Phylum: Arthropoda
- Clade: Pancrustacea
- Class: Insecta
- Order: Lepidoptera
- Superfamily: Noctuoidea
- Family: Noctuidae
- Genus: Ctenoceratoda; Varga, 1992

Genus of moths

Ctenoceratoda is a genus of moths of the family Noctuidae.

== Species ==
- Ctenoceratoda sukharevae (Varga, 1974)
