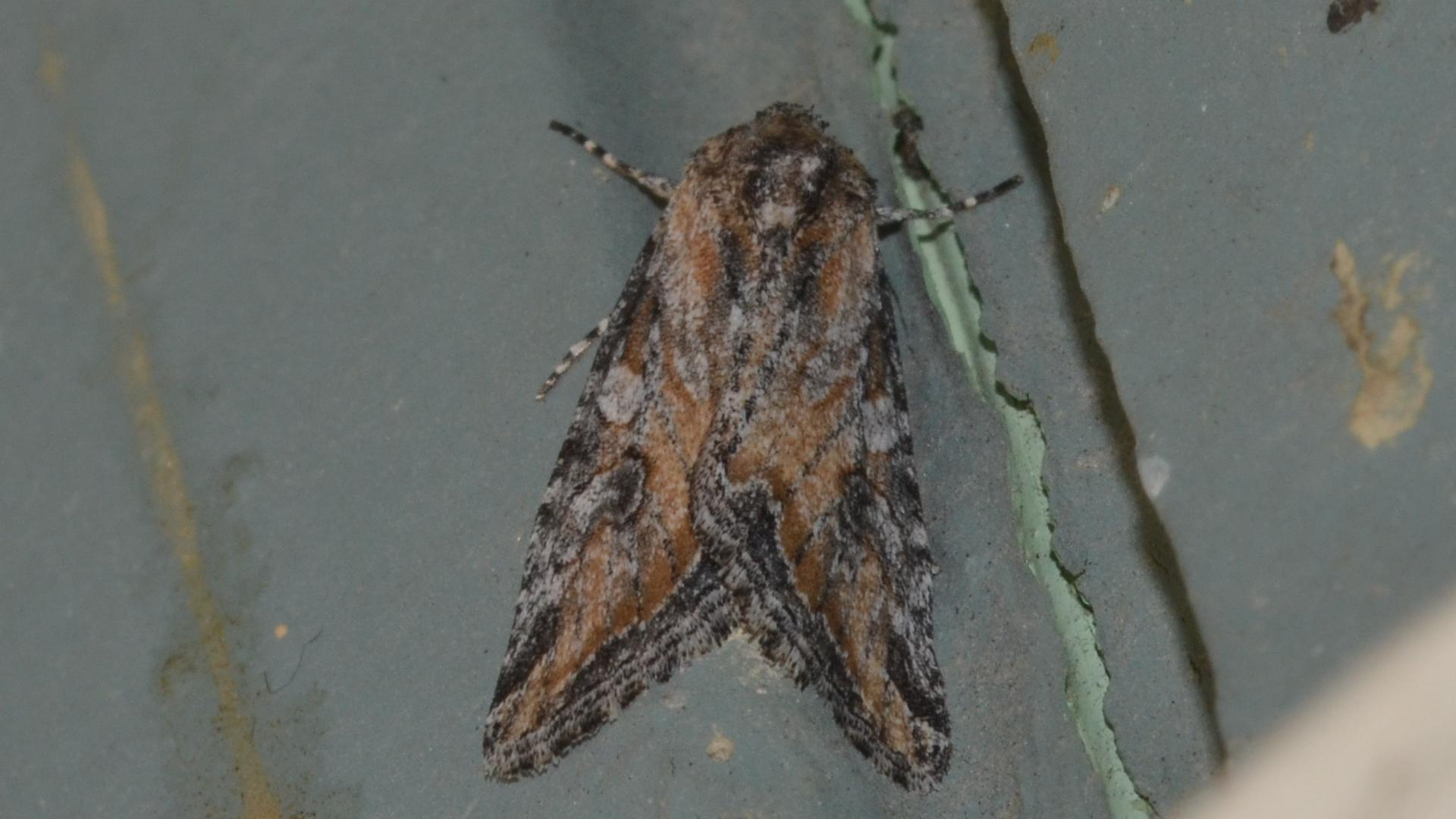

Scientific classification
- Kingdom: Animalia
- Phylum: Arthropoda
- Class: Insecta
- Order: Lepidoptera
- Superfamily: Noctuoidea
- Family: Noctuidae
- Genus: Hadenella; Grote, 1883
- Species: H. pergentilis

Binomial name
- Hadenella pergentilis Grote, 1883

= Hadenella =

Genus of moths

Hadenella is a genus of moths of the family Noctuidae. It contains only one species, Hadenella pergentilis, which is found in North America, where it has been recorded from the Pacific Northwest and Alberta south at least to Utah and Colorado in the Rocky Mountains and southern California along the Pacific Coast. The habitat consists of sage steppes.
