= Ebertidia =

Scientific classification
- Domain: Eukaryota
- Kingdom: Animalia
- Phylum: Arthropoda
- Class: Insecta
- Order: Lepidoptera
- Superfamily: Noctuoidea
- Family: Noctuidae
- Genus: Ebertidia; Boursin, 1968

Genus of moths

Ebertidia is a genus of moths of the family Noctuidae.

== Species ==
- Ebertidia hadenoides Boursin, 1967
- Ebertidia mamestrina (Butler, 1889)
