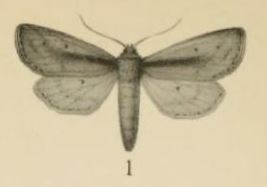

Scientific classification
- Domain: Eukaryota
- Kingdom: Animalia
- Phylum: Arthropoda
- Class: Insecta
- Order: Lepidoptera
- Superfamily: Noctuoidea
- Family: Noctuidae
- Genus: Sciomesa; Tams & J. Bowden, 1953

= Sciomesa =

Genus of moths

Sciomesa is a genus of moths of the family Noctuidae described by Willie Horace Thomas Tams and J. Bowden in 1953.

== Species ==
- Sciomesa argocyma D. S. Fletcher, 1961
- Sciomesa betschi Viette, 1967
- Sciomesa biluma Nye, 1959
- Sciomesa constantini Laporte, 1984
- Sciomesa cyclophora D. S. Fletcher, 1961
- Sciomesa etchecopari Laporte, 1975
- Sciomesa janthina Viette, 1959
- Sciomesa jemjemensis Laporte, 1984
- Sciomesa mesophaea (Hampson, 1910)
- Sciomesa mesoscia (Hampson, 1918)
- Sciomesa mirifica Laporte, 1984
- Sciomesa nyei D. S. Fletcher, 1961
- Sciomesa oberthueri Viette, 1967
- Sciomesa ochroneura D. S. Fletcher, 1963
- Sciomesa piscator D. S. Fletcher, 1961
- Sciomesa renibifida Berio, 1973
- Sciomesa scotochroa (Hampson, 1914)
- Sciomesa secata Berio, 1977
- Sciomesa sjoestedti (Aurivillius, 1925)
- Sciomesa venata D. S. Fletcher, 1961
