= Stylopoda =

Scientific classification
- Domain: Eukaryota
- Kingdom: Animalia
- Phylum: Arthropoda
- Class: Insecta
- Order: Lepidoptera
- Superfamily: Noctuoidea
- Family: Noctuidae
- Subfamily: Oncocnemidinae
- Genus: Stylopoda; J. B. Smith, 1891

Genus of moths

Stylopoda is a genus of moths of the family Noctuidae.

== Species ==
- Stylopoda anxia J.B. Smith, 1908
- Stylopoda cephalica J.B. Smith, 1891
- Stylopoda groteana (Dyar, 1903)
- Stylopoda modestella (Barnes & McDunnough, 1918)

== Former species ==
- Stylopoda aterrima is now Sympistis aterrima (Grote, 1879)
- Stylopoda sexpunctata is now Copanarta sexpunctata (Barnes & McDunnough, 1916)
