= Supralathosea =

Scientific classification
- Domain: Eukaryota
- Kingdom: Animalia
- Phylum: Arthropoda
- Class: Insecta
- Order: Lepidoptera
- Superfamily: Noctuoidea
- Family: Noctuidae
- Subfamily: Oncocnemidinae
- Genus: Supralathosea; Barnes & Benjamin, 1924

Genus of moths

Supralathosea is a genus of moths of the family Noctuidae first described by William Barnes and Foster Hendrickson Benjamin in 1924.

== Species ==
- Supralathosea baboquivariensis Barnes & Benjamin, 1924
- Supralathosea pronuba (Barnes & McDunnough, 1916)
- Supralathosea obtusa (Smith, 1909)
