= Catabenoides =

Scientific classification
- Kingdom: Animalia
- Phylum: Arthropoda
- Class: Insecta
- Order: Lepidoptera
- Superfamily: Noctuoidea
- Family: Noctuidae
- Subfamily: Oncocnemidinae
- Genus: Catabenoides; Poole in Becker and Miller, 2002

Genus of moths

Catabenoides is a genus of moths of the family Noctuidae. The genus was proposed in 2002 to include five species from the seven that were previously associated with the genus Catabena; it has since expanded to 14 species. It is a New World genus and xerophytic, found throughout the southern United States through Mexico and further south into Bolivia, Paraguay, and northern Argentina.

== Species ==
The following species are recognised in the genus Catabenoides:

- Catabenoides atratus Becker, 2021
- Catabenoides bipunctatus Becker, 2021
- Catabenoides captiosus Becker, 2021
- Catabenoides divisa (Herrich-Schäffer, 1868)
- Catabenoides divisoides Becker, 2021
- Catabenoides evanescens Becker, 2021
- Catabenoides fraternus Becker, 2021
- Catabenoides lazelli Becker & Miller, 2002
- Catabenoides multipunctatus Becker, 2021
- Catabenoides poolei Becker, 2021
- Catabenoides seorsa (Todd, 1972)
- Catabenoides terens (Walker, 1857)
- Catabenoides thoenyi Becker, 2021
- Catabenoides vitrina (Walker, 1857)
