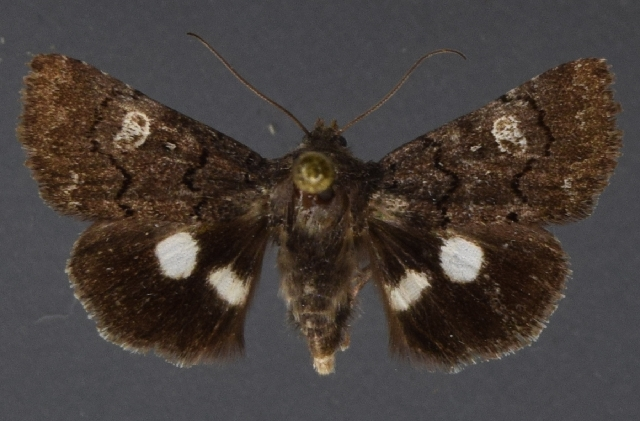
- Copanarta sexpunctata

Scientific classification
- Domain: Eukaryota
- Kingdom: Animalia
- Phylum: Arthropoda
- Class: Insecta
- Order: Lepidoptera
- Superfamily: Noctuoidea
- Family: Noctuidae
- Subfamily: Oncocnemidinae
- Genus: Copanarta; Grote, 1895

= Copanarta =

Genus of moths

Copanarta is a genus of moths of the family Noctuidae. The genus was erected by Augustus Radcliffe Grote in 1895.

== Species ==
- Copanarta aurea (Grote, 1879) (syn: Copanarta nigerrima (J. B. Smith, 1903))
- Copanarta sexpunctata (Barnes & McDunnough, 1916)
