= Supralathosea obtusa =

Scientific classification
- Kingdom: Animalia
- Phylum: Arthropoda
- Class: Insecta
- Order: Lepidoptera
- Superfamily: Noctuoidea
- Family: Noctuidae
- Subfamily: Oncocnemidinae
- Genus: Supralathosea
- Species: S. obtusa

Binomial name
- Supralathosea obtusa (Smith, 1909)

Species of moth

Supralathosea obtusa is a species of mossy sallow in the moth family Noctuidae. The MONA or Hodges number for Supralathosea obtusa is 10189.
