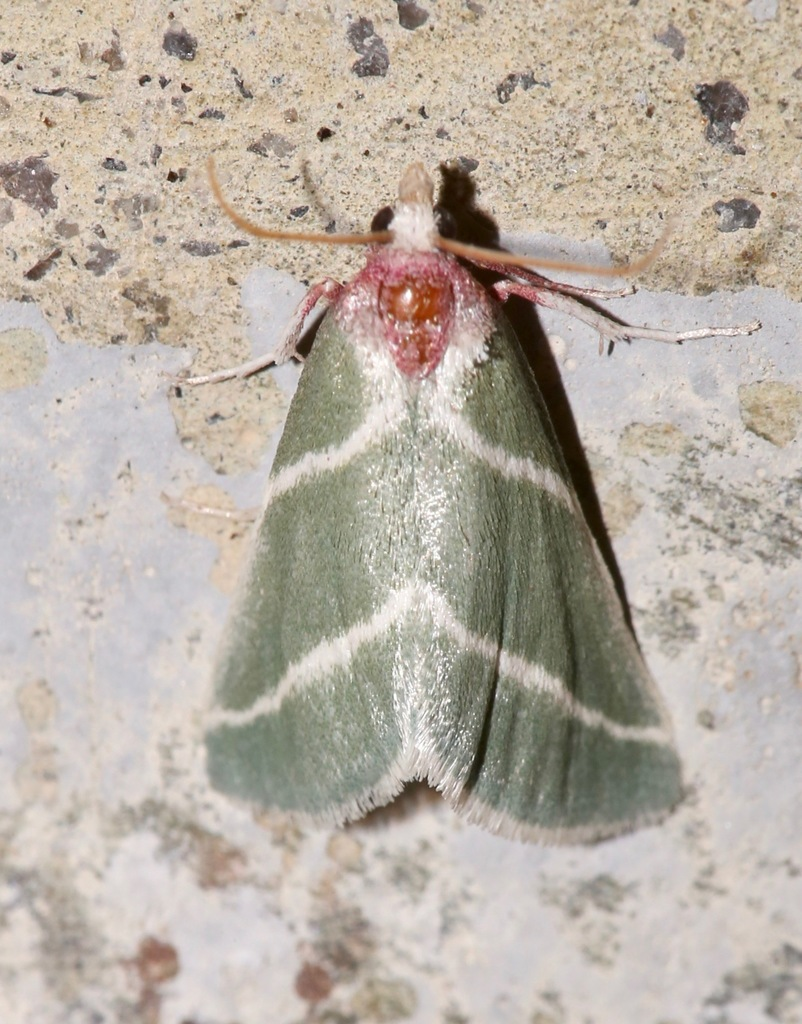

Scientific classification
- Domain: Eukaryota
- Kingdom: Animalia
- Phylum: Arthropoda
- Class: Insecta
- Order: Lepidoptera
- Family: Pyralidae
- Genus: Anemosella
- Species: A. nevalis

Binomial name
- Anemosella nevalis (Barnes & Benjamin, 1925)

Synonyms
- Lepidomys nevalis Barnes & Benjamin, 1925

= Anemosella nevalis =

Species of moth

Anemosella nevalis is a species of snout moth in the genus Anemosella. It was described by William Barnes and Foster Hendrickson Benjamin in 1925. It is found in North America, including Nevada, California and Arizona.
