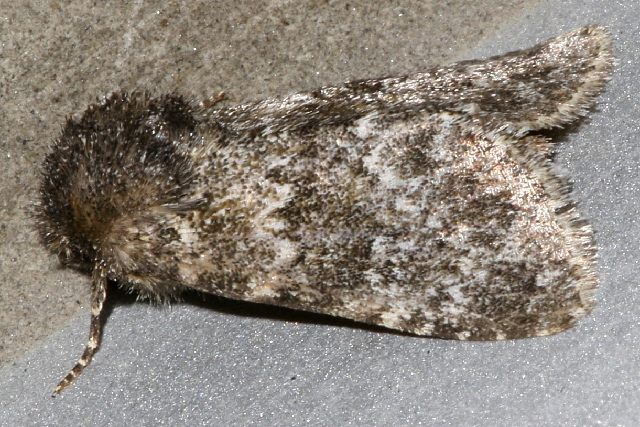
- Pseudobryomima muscosa

Scientific classification
- Domain: Eukaryota
- Kingdom: Animalia
- Phylum: Arthropoda
- Class: Insecta
- Order: Lepidoptera
- Superfamily: Noctuoidea
- Family: Noctuidae
- Tribe: Xylenini
- Genus: Pseudobryomima; Barnes & Benjamin, 1927

= Pseudobryomima =

Genus of moths

Pseudobryomima is a genus of moths of the family Noctuidae. The genus was erected by William Barnes and Foster Hendrickson Benjamin in 1927.

== Species ==
- Pseudobryomima distans (Barnes & McDunnough, 1912)
- Pseudobryomima fallax (Hampson, 1906)
- Pseudobryomima muscosa (Hampson, 1906)
