= Comadia intrusa =

Scientific classification
- Domain: Eukaryota
- Kingdom: Animalia
- Phylum: Arthropoda
- Class: Insecta
- Order: Lepidoptera
- Family: Cossidae
- Genus: Comadia
- Species: C. intrusa

Binomial name
- Comadia intrusa Barnes & Benjamin, 1923

Synonyms
- Hypopta intrusa

Species of moth

Comadia intrusa is a moth in the family Cossidae first described by William Barnes and Foster Hendrickson Benjamin in 1923. It is found in North America, where it has been recorded from New Mexico, Arizona and California.

The forewing is 13–17 mm for males, and about 20 mm for females. Adults have been recorded on wing from May to June.
