= Properigea =

Scientific classification
- Domain: Eukaryota
- Kingdom: Animalia
- Phylum: Arthropoda
- Class: Insecta
- Order: Lepidoptera
- Superfamily: Noctuoidea
- Family: Noctuidae
- Tribe: Xylenini
- Genus: Properigea; Barnes & Benjamin, 1926

Genus of moths

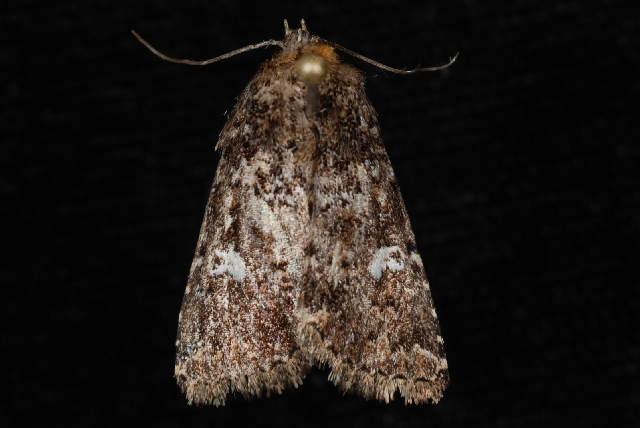
Properigea albimacula

Properigea is a genus of moths of the family Noctuidae. The genus was erected by William Barnes and Foster Hendrickson Benjamin in 1926.

== Species ==
- Properigea albimacula (Barnes & McDunnough, 1912)
- Properigea continens (H. Edwards, 1885)
- Properigea costa (Barnes & Benjamin, 1923)
- Properigea loculosa (Grote, 1881)
- Properigea mephisto (Blanchard, 1968)
- Properigea niveirena (Harvey, 1876)
- Properigea perolivalis (Barnes & McDunnough, 1912)
- Properigea seitzi (Barnes & Benjamin, 1926)
- Properigea suffusa (Barnes & McDunnough, 1912)
- Properigea tapeta (Smith, 1900)
