= Comadia dolli =

Scientific classification
- Kingdom: Animalia
- Phylum: Arthropoda
- Clade: Pancrustacea
- Class: Insecta
- Order: Lepidoptera
- Family: Cossidae
- Genus: Comadia
- Species: C. dolli

Binomial name
- Comadia dolli Barnes & Benjamin, 1923

Species of moth

Comadia dolli is a moth in the family Cossidae first described by William Barnes and Foster Hendrickson Benjamin in 1923. It is found in North America, where it has been recorded from Arizona, California, Nevada and New Mexico.

The forewing is 12–15 mm. Adults have been recorded on wing from May to August.
