= Supralathosea baboquivariensis =

Scientific classification
- Kingdom: Animalia
- Phylum: Arthropoda
- Clade: Pancrustacea
- Class: Insecta
- Order: Lepidoptera
- Superfamily: Noctuoidea
- Family: Noctuidae
- Genus: Supralathosea
- Species: S. baboquivariensis

Binomial name
- Supralathosea baboquivariensis Barnes & Benjamin, 1924

Species of moth

Supralathosea baboquivariensis is a species of mossy sallow in the family of moths known as Noctuidae. It was first described by William Barnes and Foster Hendrickson Benjamin in 1924 and it is found in North America.

The MONA or Hodges number for Supralathosea baboquivariensis is 10024.
