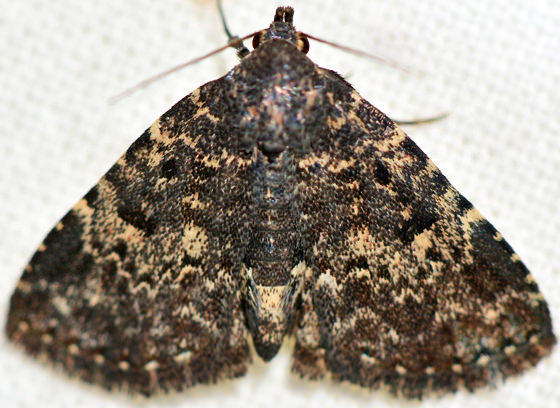

Scientific classification
- Domain: Eukaryota
- Kingdom: Animalia
- Phylum: Arthropoda
- Class: Insecta
- Order: Lepidoptera
- Superfamily: Noctuoidea
- Family: Erebidae
- Genus: Metalectra
- Species: M. diabolica

Binomial name
- Metalectra diabolica Barnes & Benjamin, 1924

= Metalectra diabolica =

Species of moth

Metalectra diabolica, the diabolical fungus moth, is a moth of the family Erebidae. The species was first described by William Barnes and Foster Hendrickson Benjamin in 1924. It is found in North America, where it has been recorded from North Carolina to Florida and Arkansas to Texas.

The wingspan is 18–23 mm. Adults have been recorded on wing from May to October, with most records from May.

The larvae feed on fungi.
