= Catabena =

- Catabena lineolata

Scientific classification
- Kingdom: Animalia
- Phylum: Arthropoda
- Class: Insecta
- Order: Lepidoptera
- Superfamily: Noctuoidea
- Family: Noctuidae
- Subfamily: Oncocnemidinae
- Genus: Catabena; Walker, 1865

Genus of moths

Catabena is a genus of moths of the family Noctuidae.

== Species ==
- Catabena lineolata Walker, 1865
- Catabena sagittata Barnes & McDunnough, 1913

== Former species ==
- Catabena pronuba is now Supralathosea pronuba Barnes & McDunnough, 1916
