= Properigea costa =

Scientific classification
- Domain: Eukaryota
- Kingdom: Animalia
- Phylum: Arthropoda
- Class: Insecta
- Order: Lepidoptera
- Superfamily: Noctuoidea
- Family: Noctuidae
- Genus: Properigea
- Species: P. costa

Binomial name
- Properigea costa (Barnes & Benjamin, 1923)

Species of moth

Properigea costa, the barrens moth, is a species of cutworm or dart moth in the family Noctuidae. It was first described by William Barnes and Foster Hendrickson Benjamin in 1923 and it is found in North America.

The MONA or Hodges number for Properigea costa is 9589.
