= Scotogramma harnardi =

Scientific classification
- Domain: Eukaryota
- Kingdom: Animalia
- Phylum: Arthropoda
- Class: Insecta
- Order: Lepidoptera
- Superfamily: Noctuoidea
- Family: Noctuidae
- Genus: Scotogramma
- Species: S. harnardi

Binomial name
- Scotogramma harnardi Barnes & Benjamin, 1924

Species of moth

Scotogramma harnardi is a species of cutworm or dart moth in the family Noctuidae first described by William Barnes and Foster Hendrickson Benjamin in 1924. It is found in North America.

The MONA or Hodges number for Scotogramma harnardi is 10242.
