= Scotogramma fieldi =

Scientific classification
- Domain: Eukaryota
- Kingdom: Animalia
- Phylum: Arthropoda
- Class: Insecta
- Order: Lepidoptera
- Superfamily: Noctuoidea
- Family: Noctuidae
- Genus: Scotogramma
- Species: S. fieldi

Binomial name
- Scotogramma fieldi Barnes & Benjamin, 1927

Species of moth

Scotogramma fieldi is a species of cutworm or dart moth in the family Noctuidae first described by William Barnes and Foster Hendrickson Benjamin in 1927. It is found in North America.

The MONA or Hodges number for Scotogramma fieldi is 10250.
