= Hemiplatytes =

Scientific classification
- Domain: Eukaryota
- Kingdom: Animalia
- Phylum: Arthropoda
- Class: Insecta
- Order: Lepidoptera
- Family: Crambidae
- Subfamily: Crambinae
- Tribe: incertae sedis
- Genus: Hemiplatytes; Barnes & Benjamin, 1924

Synonyms
- Alamogordia Dyar & Heinrich, 1927

Genus of moths

Hemiplatytes is a genus of moths of the family Crambidae erected by William Barnes and Foster Hendrickson Benjamin in 1924.

== Species ==
- Hemiplatytes epia (Dyar, 1912)
- Hemiplatytes parallela (Kearfott, 1908)
- Hemiplatytes prosenes (Dyar, 1912)
