= Scotogramma fervida =

Scientific classification
- Domain: Eukaryota
- Kingdom: Animalia
- Phylum: Arthropoda
- Class: Insecta
- Order: Lepidoptera
- Superfamily: Noctuoidea
- Family: Noctuidae
- Genus: Scotogramma
- Species: S. fervida

Binomial name
- Scotogramma fervida Barnes & McDunnough, 1912

Species of moth

Scotogramma fervida is a species of cutworm or dart moth in the family Noctuidae first described by William Barnes and Foster Hendrickson Benjamin in 1912. It is found in North America.

The MONA or Hodges number for Scotogramma fervida is 10239.

== Subspecies ==
These two subspecies belong to the species Scotogramma fervida:

- Scotogramma fervida fervida^{g}
- Scotogramma fervida proxima Barnes & Benjamin, 1924^{c g}

Data sources: i = ITIS, c = Catalogue of Life, g = GBIF, b = BugGuide
