= Comadia subterminata =

Scientific classification
- Domain: Eukaryota
- Kingdom: Animalia
- Phylum: Arthropoda
- Class: Insecta
- Order: Lepidoptera
- Family: Cossidae
- Genus: Comadia
- Species: C. subterminata

Binomial name
- Comadia subterminata Barnes & Benjamin, 1923

Synonyms
- Comadia bertholdi fusca Barnes & Benjamin, 1923

Species of moth

Comadia subterminata is a moth in the family Cossidae first described by William Barnes and Foster Hendrickson Benjamin in 1923. It is found in North America, where it has been recorded from Arizona, Utah, Colorado and New Mexico.

The forewing is 13–18 mm for males and 19–21 mm for females. Adults have been recorded on wing from May to July.
