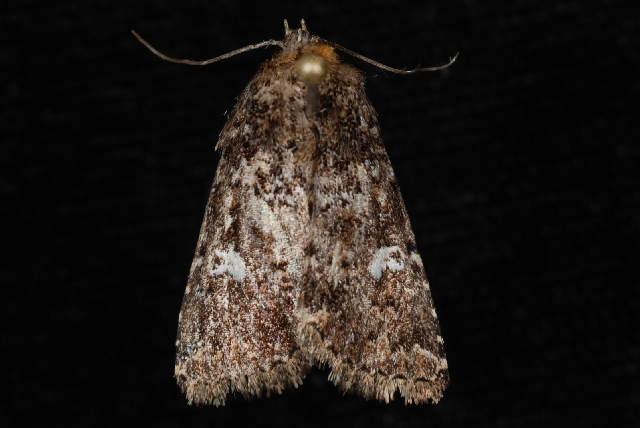

Scientific classification
- Domain: Eukaryota
- Kingdom: Animalia
- Phylum: Arthropoda
- Class: Insecta
- Order: Lepidoptera
- Superfamily: Noctuoidea
- Family: Noctuidae
- Genus: Properigea
- Species: P. albimacula

Binomial name
- Properigea albimacula (Barnes & McDunnough, 1912)

Synonyms
- Namangana albimacula Barnes & McDunnough, 1912

= Properigea albimacula =

Species of moth

Properigea albimacula is a small to medium-sized moth in the family Noctuidae first described by William Barnes and James Halliday McDunnough in 1912. It is found in the western US on the slopes of Cascades north of Oregon and almost throughout California. The wingspan is about 15 mm. Adults fly during the summer and are most common during July. This species is nocturnal and comes to lights.

== Wings ==
Properigea albimacula has a mottled brown forewing with a white-rimmed reniform spot. The distal forewing is fairly broad.

== Color ==
The color is mottled warm brown, slightly darker at the base and in the subterminal area and slightly lighter in the terminal area. The lines are dark gray, partially double filled with the ground color or powdery light tan and white. The fringe is powdery brown. The head and thorax are powdery dark brown with a dark edge on the collar. The male antenna is filiform (thread like).

== Identification ==
This species can be recognized by its small-to-medium-size, warm brown forewing with a pure white-filled reniform spot. It is unlikely to be confused with other moths in the area. The similar grayer species Properigea perolivalis extends to northern California and is possible in southwestern Oregon.

== Habitat ==
It is commonly found in mixed hardwood forests, oak woodlands, and coastal rainforests west of the Cascades at low to middle elevations, and in mixed hardwood-conifer forests along the west slope of the Cascades at higher elevations. It also occurs in dry forests and riparian areas east of the Cascades.
