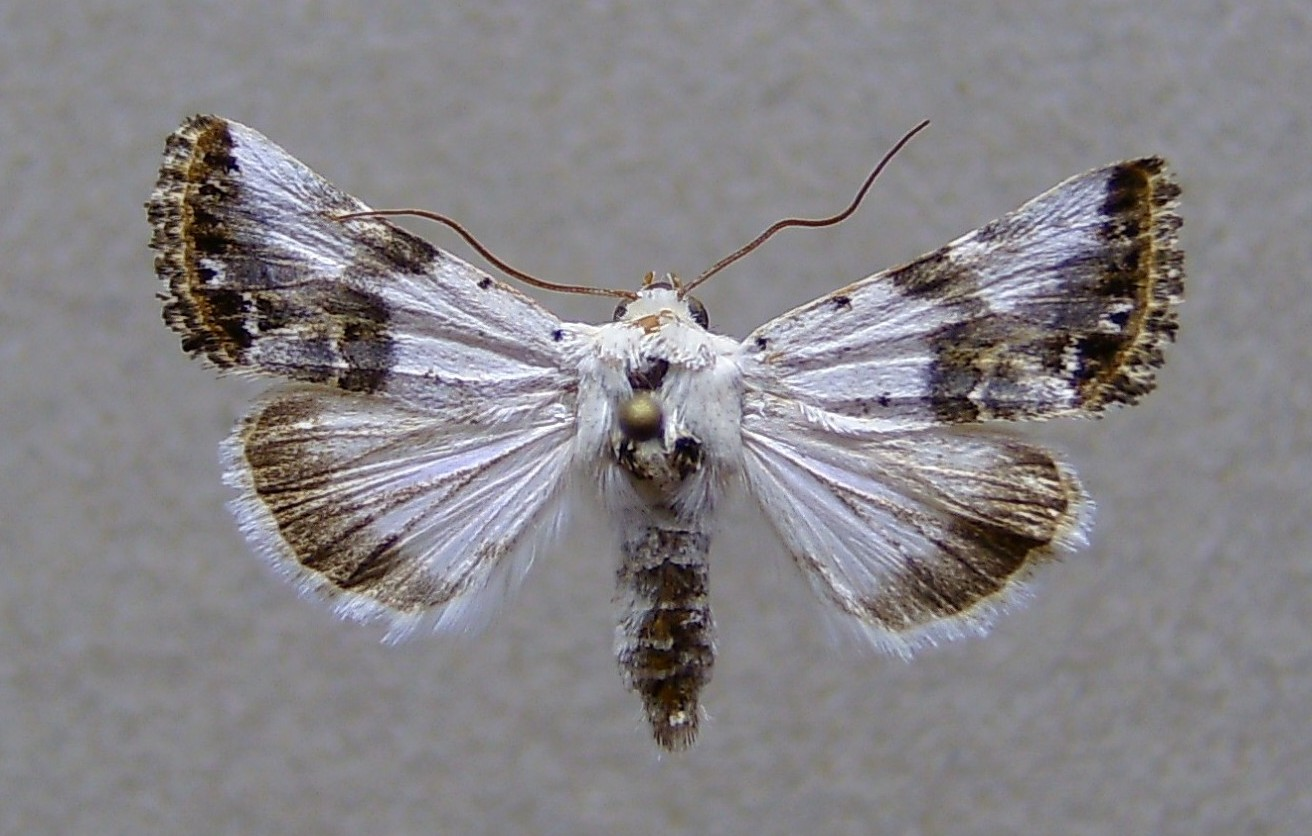

Scientific classification
- Kingdom: Animalia
- Phylum: Arthropoda
- Class: Insecta
- Order: Lepidoptera
- Superfamily: Noctuoidea
- Family: Noctuidae
- Genus: Calophasia
- Species: C. opalina

Binomial name
- Calophasia opalina (Esper, 1793)

Synonyms
- Phalaena opalina Esper, 1793; Phalaena casta Borkhausen, 1793; Calophasia castior Stauder, 1923

= Calophasia opalina =

Species of moth

Calophasia opalina is a moth of the family Noctuidae first described by Eugenius Johann Christoph Esper in 1793. It is found from Southern Europe to Central Asia.

The wingspan is 26–31 mm. Adults are on wing from April to June and again from July September in two generations per year.

The larvae feed on the leaves and flowers Antirrhinum, Delphinium and Linaria species. The pupae of the second generation overwinter.
