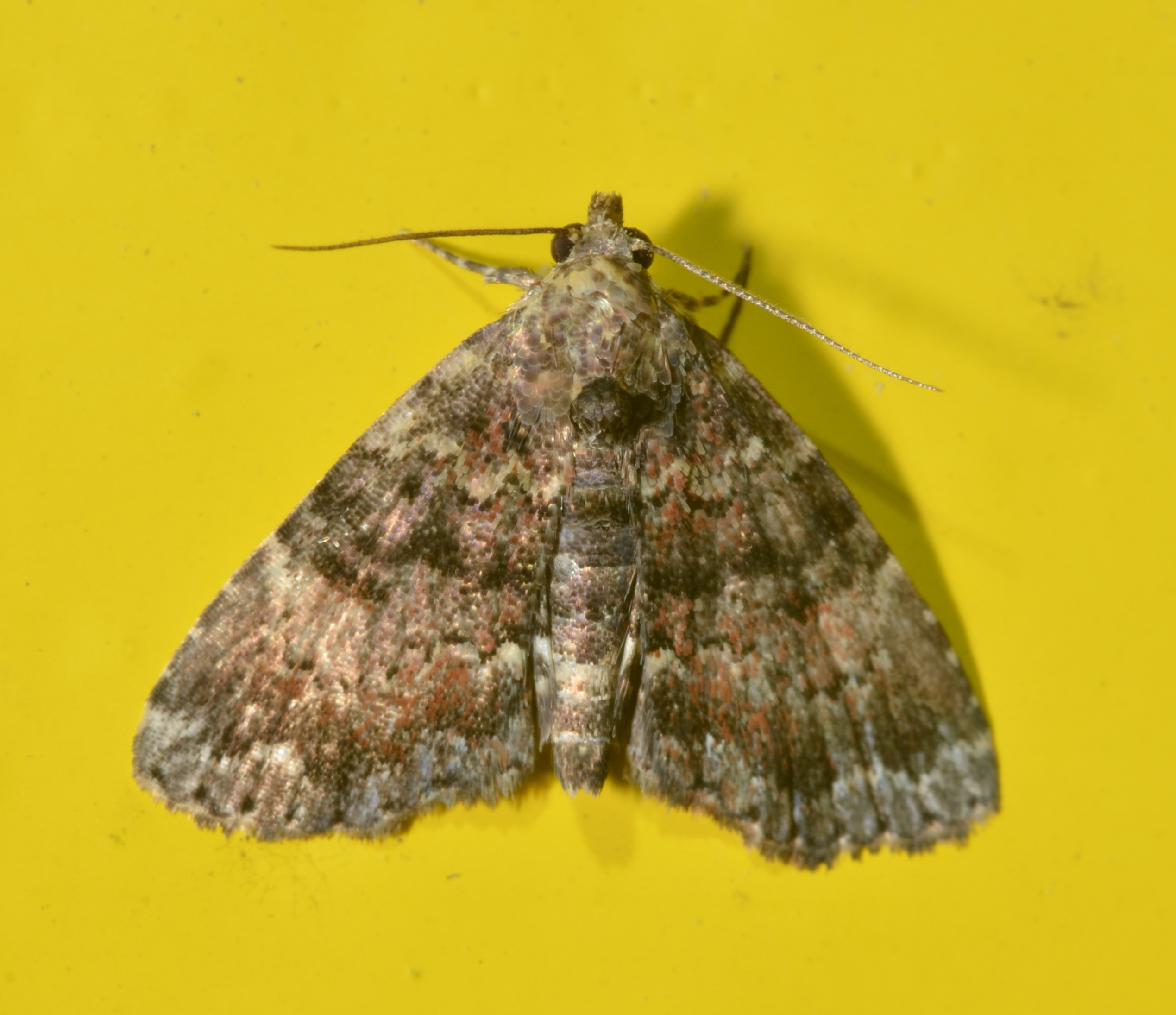

Scientific classification
- Kingdom: Animalia
- Phylum: Arthropoda
- Clade: Pancrustacea
- Class: Insecta
- Order: Lepidoptera
- Superfamily: Noctuoidea
- Family: Erebidae
- Genus: Metalectra
- Species: M. richardsi

Binomial name
- Metalectra richardsi Brower, 1941

= Metalectra richardsi =

Species of moth

Metalectra richardsi, or Richards' fungus moth, is a species of moth in the family Erebidae. The species was described by Auburn Edmond Brower in 1941. It is found in North America.

The MONA or Hodges number for Metalectra richardsi is 8505.
