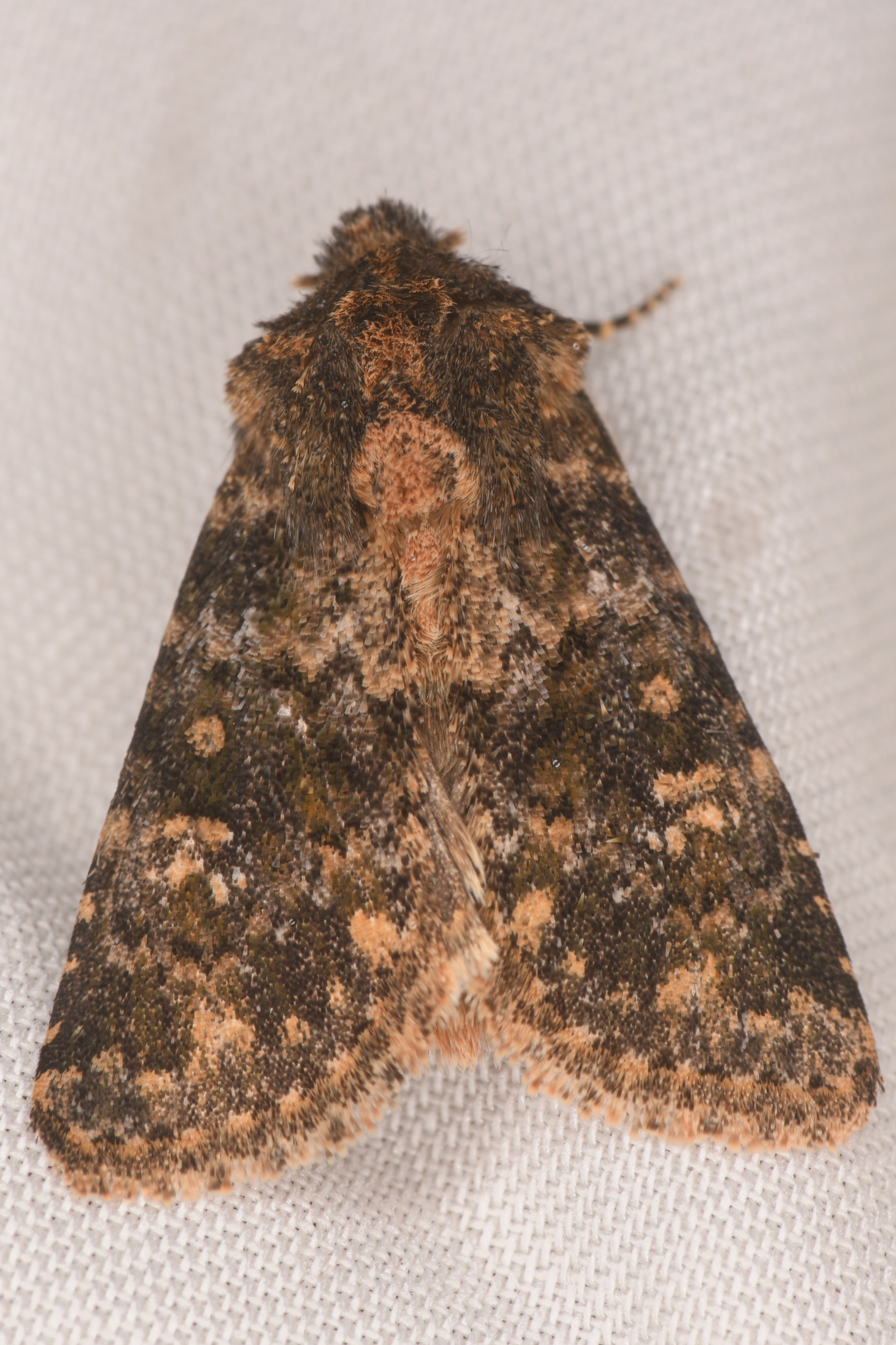

Scientific classification
- Kingdom: Animalia
- Phylum: Arthropoda
- Class: Insecta
- Order: Lepidoptera
- Superfamily: Noctuoidea
- Family: Noctuidae
- Tribe: Xylenini
- Genus: Pseudobryomima
- Species: P. fallax

Binomial name
- Pseudobryomima fallax (Hampson, 1906)

= Pseudobryomima fallax =

Species of moth

Pseudobryomima fallax is a species of cutworm or dart moth in the family Noctuidae. It is found in North America.
