= Pseudobryomima distans =

Scientific classification
- Domain: Eukaryota
- Kingdom: Animalia
- Phylum: Arthropoda
- Class: Insecta
- Order: Lepidoptera
- Superfamily: Noctuoidea
- Family: Noctuidae
- Genus: Pseudobryomima
- Species: P. distans

Binomial name
- Pseudobryomima distans (Barnes & McDunnough, 1912)

Species of moth

Pseudobryomima distans is a species of cutworm or dart moth in the family Noctuidae first described by William Barnes and James Halliday McDunnough in 1912. It is found in North America.

The MONA or Hodges number for Pseudobryomima distans is 9598.
