= Comadia =

Scientific classification
- Domain: Eukaryota
- Kingdom: Animalia
- Phylum: Arthropoda
- Class: Insecta
- Order: Lepidoptera
- Family: Cossidae
- Subfamily: Cossinae
- Genus: Comadia; Barnes & McDunnough, 1911

Synonyms
- Heterocoma Barnes & McDunnough, 1918

Genus of moths

Comadia is a genus of moths in the family Cossidae first described by William Barnes and James Halliday McDunnough in 1911.

== Species ==
- Comadia albistrigata Barnes & McDunnough, 1918
- Comadia alleni Brown, 1975
- Comadia arenae Brown, 1975
- Comadia bertholdi Grote, 1880
- Comadia dolli Barnes & Benjamin, 1923
- Comadia henrici Grote, 1882
- Comadia intrusa Barnes & Benjamin, 1923
- Comadia manfredi Neumann, 1884
- Comadia redtenbacheri Hammerschmidt, 1848
- Comadia speratus Brown, 1975
- Comadia suaedivora Brown & Allen, 1973
- Comadia subterminata Barnes & Benjamin, 1923
