= Copanarta aurea =

Scientific classification
- Kingdom: Animalia
- Phylum: Arthropoda
- Class: Insecta
- Order: Lepidoptera
- Superfamily: Noctuoidea
- Family: Noctuidae
- Genus: Copanarta
- Species: C. aurea

Binomial name
- Copanarta aurea (Grote, 1879)

Synonyms
- Copanarta nigerrima (Smith, 1903)

Species of moth

Copanarta aurea is a species of moth in the family Noctuidae (the owlet moths). It is found in North America.

The MONA or Hodges number for Copanarta aurea is 10169.
