= Anemosella basalis =

Scientific classification
- Domain: Eukaryota
- Kingdom: Animalia
- Phylum: Arthropoda
- Class: Insecta
- Order: Lepidoptera
- Family: Pyralidae
- Genus: Anemosella
- Species: A. basalis

Binomial name
- Anemosella basalis Dyar, 1914

Synonyms
- Anemosella polingalis Barnes & Benjamin, 1926

Species of moth

Anemosella basalis is a species of snout moth. It is found in Mexico and the US state of Arizona.
