= Properigea continens =

Scientific classification
- Domain: Eukaryota
- Kingdom: Animalia
- Phylum: Arthropoda
- Class: Insecta
- Order: Lepidoptera
- Superfamily: Noctuoidea
- Family: Noctuidae
- Tribe: Xylenini
- Genus: Properigea
- Species: P. continens

Binomial name
- Properigea continens (H. Edwards, 1885)

Species of moth

Properigea continens is a species of cutworm or dart moth in the family Noctuidae.

The MONA or Hodges number for Properigea continens is 9590.
