= Comadia manfredi =

Scientific classification
- Domain: Eukaryota
- Kingdom: Animalia
- Phylum: Arthropoda
- Class: Insecta
- Order: Lepidoptera
- Family: Cossidae
- Genus: Comadia
- Species: C. manfredi

Binomial name
- Comadia manfredi (Neumoegen, 1884)

Synonyms
- Hypopta manfredi Neumoegen, 1883

Species of moth

Comadia manfredi is a moth in the family Cossidae. It is found in North America, where it has been recorded from Arizona and New Mexico, as well as Ohio.

The length of the forewings is about 11 mm. The fore- and hindwings are cream without markings. Adults have been recorded on wing from April to May in the southern part of the range and from July to August in Ohio.
