= Calophasia angularis =

Scientific classification
- Domain: Eukaryota
- Kingdom: Animalia
- Phylum: Arthropoda
- Class: Insecta
- Order: Lepidoptera
- Superfamily: Noctuoidea
- Family: Noctuidae
- Genus: Calophasia
- Species: C. angularis

Binomial name
- Calophasia angularis Chrétien, 1911

Synonyms
- Calophasia stigmatica Rothschild, 1913; Calophasia liberatii Turati, 1924; Calophasia danieli Le Cerf, 1924; Calophasia pintori Turati, 1924; Calophasia volmeri Hering,1930

Species of moth

Calophasia angularis is a moth of the family Noctuidae. The species was first described by Pierre Chrétien in 1911. It is found from the western parts of the Sahara and Morocco throughout all North Africa, Riyadh, Israel, Jordan and Turkmenistan.

Adults are on wing from February to March. There is one generation per year.
