= Comadia suaedivora =

Scientific classification
- Kingdom: Animalia
- Phylum: Arthropoda
- Clade: Pancrustacea
- Class: Insecta
- Order: Lepidoptera
- Family: Cossidae
- Genus: Comadia
- Species: C. suaedivora

Binomial name
- Comadia suaedivora Brown & Allen, 1973

Species of moth

Comadia suaedivora is a moth in the family Cossidae. It is found in North America, where it has been recorded from California.

The forewing is 12–16 mm for males and 12–17 mm for females. The forewings are fuscous. Adults have been recorded on wing from April to June.
