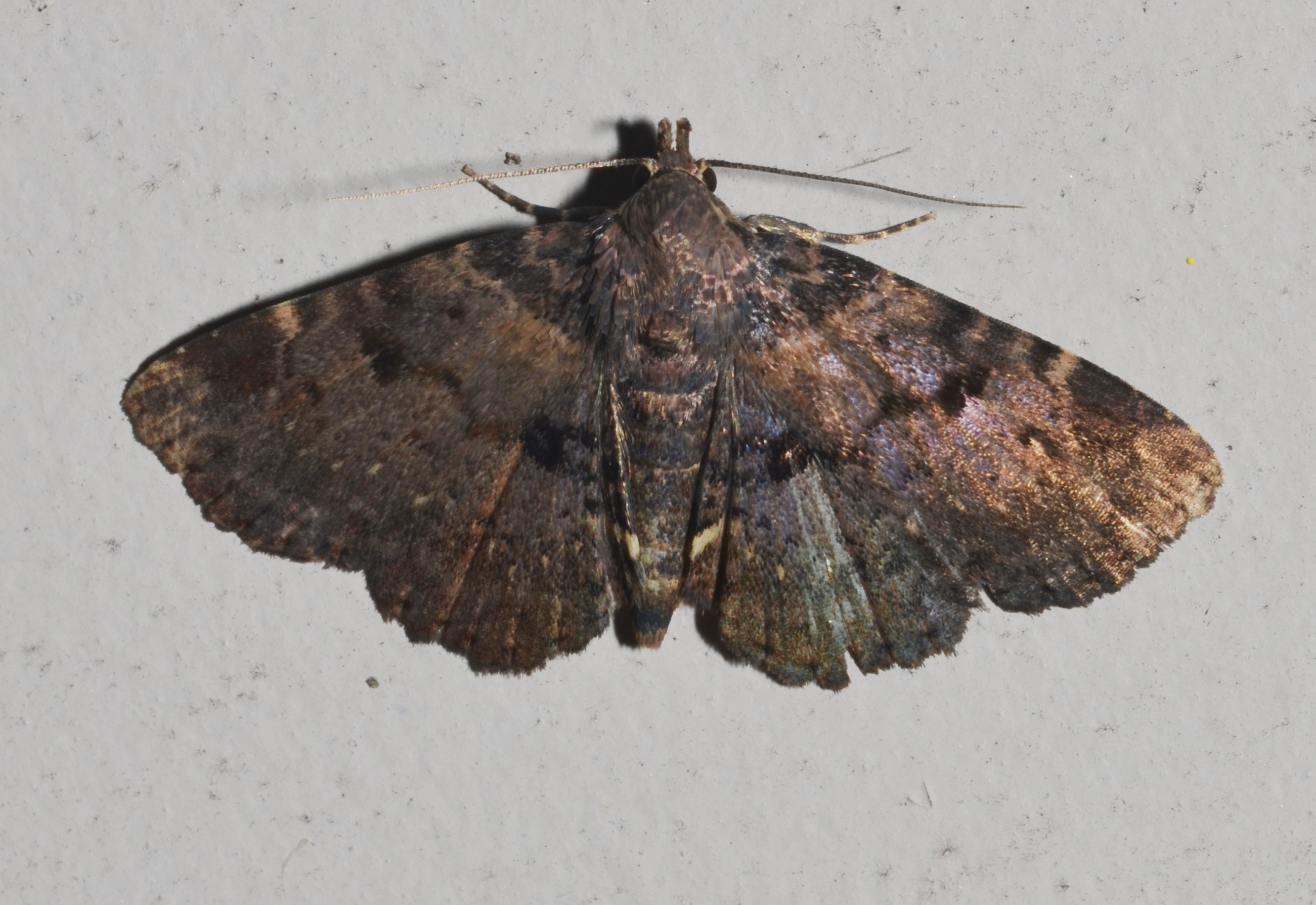

Scientific classification
- Kingdom: Animalia
- Phylum: Arthropoda
- Class: Insecta
- Order: Lepidoptera
- Superfamily: Noctuoidea
- Family: Erebidae
- Genus: Metalectra
- Species: M. quadrisignata

Binomial name
- Metalectra quadrisignata (Walker, 1858)

Synonyms
- Homoptera quadrisignata Walker, [1858]; Homoptera contracta Walker, 1860; Homoptera zonata Walker, 1865; Homopyralis tactus Grote, 1874

= Metalectra quadrisignata =

Species of moth

Metalectra quadrisignata, the four-spotted fungus moth, is a species of moth in the family Erebidae. It is found in North America, where it has been recorded from Arizona, Florida, Georgia, Indiana, Iowa, Kentucky, Louisiana, Maine, Maryland, Massachusetts, Michigan, New Brunswick, New Hampshire, New Jersey, North Carolina, Ohio, Oklahoma, Pennsylvania, Quebec, South Carolina, Tennessee, Texas, Virginia, West Virginia and Wisconsin. The species was described by Francis Walker in 1858.

The wingspan is about 25 mm.

The MONA or Hodges number for Metalectra quadrisignata is 8500.

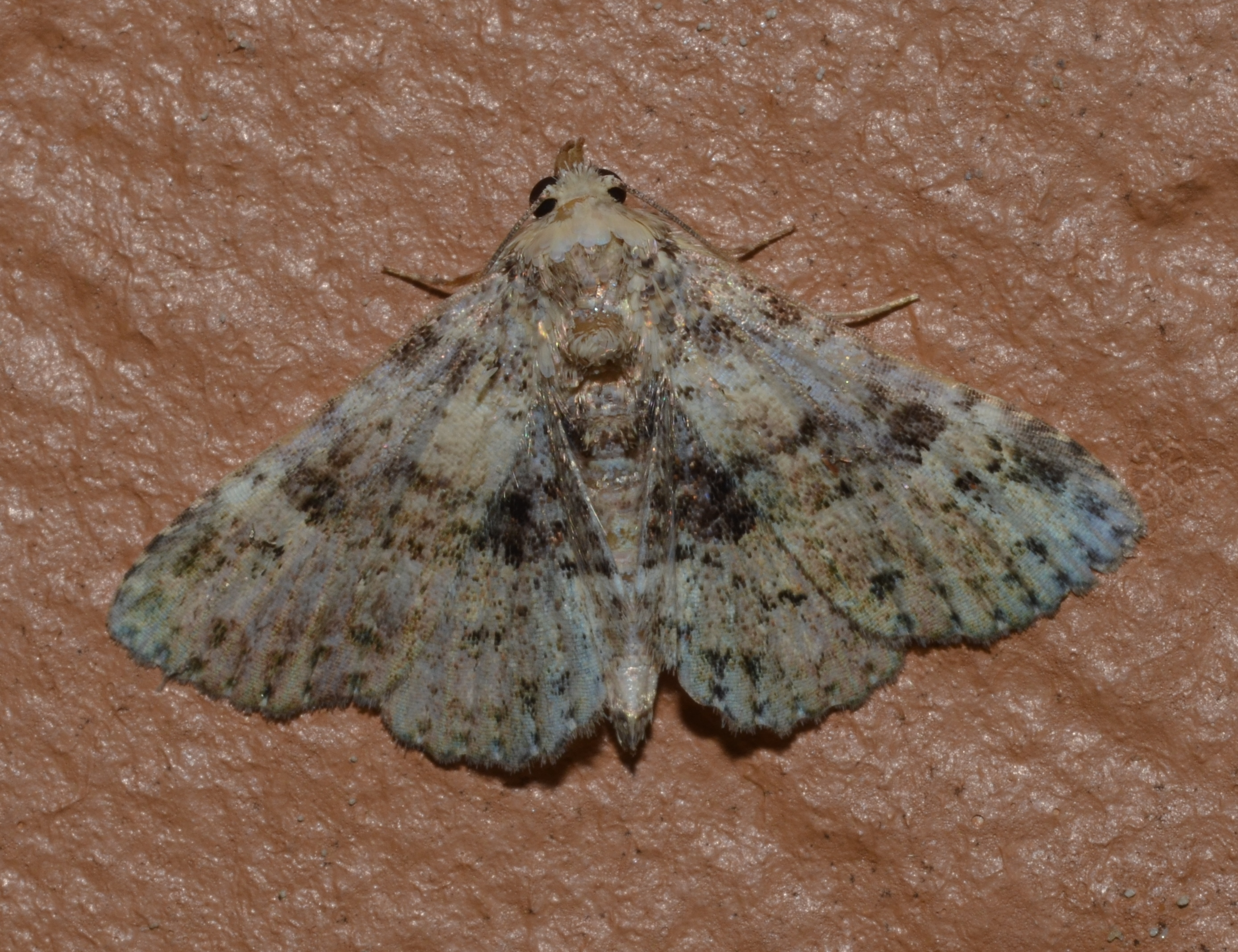
