= Catabena lineolata =

Scientific classification
- Kingdom: Animalia
- Phylum: Arthropoda
- Clade: Pancrustacea
- Class: Insecta
- Order: Lepidoptera
- Superfamily: Noctuoidea
- Family: Noctuidae
- Genus: Catabena
- Species: C. lineolata

Binomial name
- Catabena lineolata Walker, 1865

Species of moth

Catabena lineolata, the fine-lined sallow, is a species of moth in the family Noctuidae (the owlet moths). It is found in North America.

The MONA or Hodges number for Catabena lineolata is 10033.
