= Comadia bertholdi =

Scientific classification
- Kingdom: Animalia
- Phylum: Arthropoda
- Class: Insecta
- Order: Lepidoptera
- Family: Cossidae
- Genus: Comadia
- Species: C. bertholdi

Binomial name
- Comadia bertholdi (Grote, 1880)

Synonyms
- Hypopta bertholdi Grote, 1880; Hypopta edwardi Neumoegen & Dyar, 1893; Comadia engelhardti Barnes & Benjamin, 1923; Comadia stabilis Barnes & Benjamin, 1923; Comadia polingi Barnes & Benjamin, 1927

Species of moth

Comadia bertholdi, the lupine borer moth, is a moth in the family Cossidae. It is found in the United States, where it has been recorded from Washington, Colorado, Wyoming, Arizona, California, Nevada and New Mexico.

The length of the forewings is 13–17 mm for males and 18–19 mm for females. Adults have been recorded on wing from April to August.

The larvae feed on Lupinus species.

== Subspecies ==
- Comadia bertholdi bertholdi (California, Colorado, Wyoming)
- Comadia bertholdi indistincta Brown, 1976 (California)
- Comadia bertholdi polingi Barnes & Benjamin, 1927 (Arizona, California, Nevada, New Mexico)
