= Properigea loculosa =

Scientific classification
- Domain: Eukaryota
- Kingdom: Animalia
- Phylum: Arthropoda
- Class: Insecta
- Order: Lepidoptera
- Superfamily: Noctuoidea
- Family: Noctuidae
- Genus: Properigea
- Species: P. loculosa

Binomial name
- Properigea loculosa Grote, 1881

Synonyms
- Homohadena loculosa; Perigea loculosa; Bryomina continentis; Bryomina oziphona

Species of moth

Properigea loculosa is a moth in the family Noctuidae. It is found in South-Western North America, including Arizona and Mexico.

The wingspan is about 25 mm.
