= Scotogramma deffessa =

Scientific classification
- Kingdom: Animalia
- Phylum: Arthropoda
- Class: Insecta
- Order: Lepidoptera
- Superfamily: Noctuoidea
- Family: Noctuidae
- Genus: Scotogramma
- Species: S. deffessa

Binomial name
- Scotogramma deffessa (Grote, 1880)

Species of moth

Scotogramma deffessa is a species of cutworm or dart moth in the family Noctuidae.

The MONA or Hodges number for Scotogramma deffessa is 10251.
