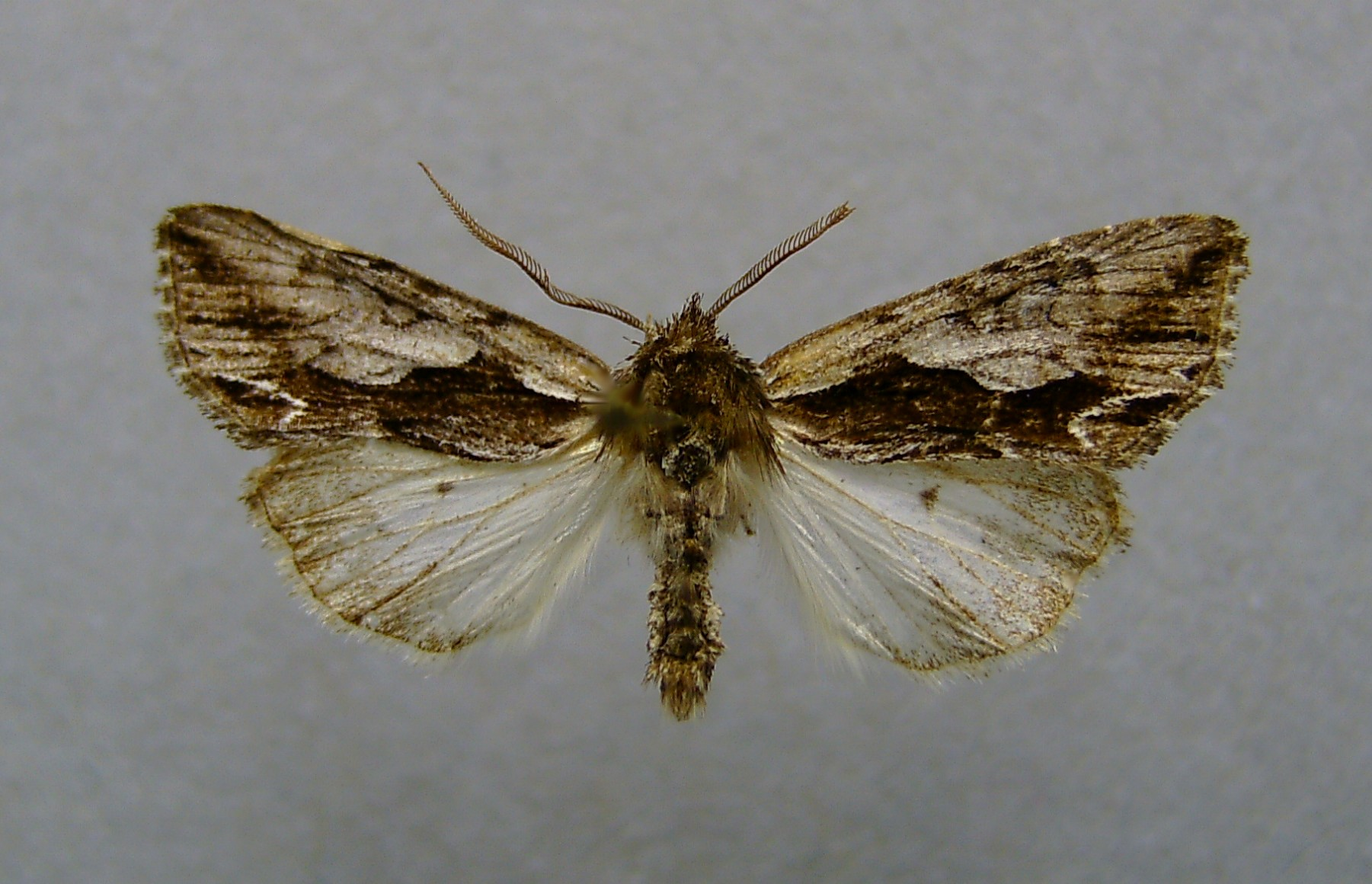
- Calliergis ramosa

Scientific classification
- Kingdom: Animalia
- Phylum: Arthropoda
- Clade: Pancrustacea
- Class: Insecta
- Order: Lepidoptera
- Superfamily: Noctuoidea
- Family: Noctuidae
- Subfamily: Oncocnemidinae
- Genus: Calliergis; Hübner, 1821

= Calliergis =

Genus of moths

Calliergis is a genus of moths of the family Noctuidae. The genus was erected by Jacob Hübner in 1821.

== Species ==
- Calliergis draesekei (Draudt, 1950) Yunnan
- Calliergis ramosa (Esper, 1786) central and south-eastern Europe
- Calliergis ramosula (Staudinger, 1888) south-eastern Siberia, Manchuria, Korea, Japan
