= Comadia arenae =

Scientific classification
- Kingdom: Animalia
- Phylum: Arthropoda
- Clade: Pancrustacea
- Class: Insecta
- Order: Lepidoptera
- Family: Cossidae
- Genus: Comadia
- Species: C. arenae

Binomial name
- Comadia arenae Brown, 1975

Species of moth

Comadia arenae is a moth in the family Cossidae. It is found in North America, where it has been recorded from California.

The forewing is 13–17 mm. Adults have been recorded on wing from June to July.
