= Metalectra edilis =

Scientific classification
- Kingdom: Animalia
- Phylum: Arthropoda
- Clade: Pancrustacea
- Class: Insecta
- Order: Lepidoptera
- Superfamily: Noctuoidea
- Family: Erebidae
- Subfamily: Boletobiinae
- Genus: Metalectra
- Species: M. edilis

Binomial name
- Metalectra edilis (Smith, 1906)

Species of moth

Metalectra edilis is a species of moth in the family Erebidae. It is found in North America.

The MONA or Hodges number for Metalectra edilis is 8507.
