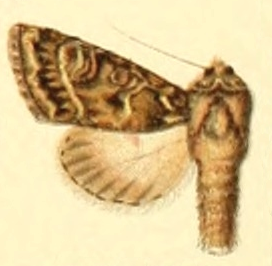
- Scotogramma peculiaris

Scientific classification
- Domain: Eukaryota
- Kingdom: Animalia
- Phylum: Arthropoda
- Class: Insecta
- Order: Lepidoptera
- Superfamily: Noctuoidea
- Family: Noctuidae
- Tribe: Hadenini
- Genus: Scotogramma; H. Edwards, 1887

= Scotogramma =

Genus of moths

Scotogramma is a genus of moths of the family Noctuidae.

== Species ==
- Scotogramma deffessa (Grote, 1880) (alternative spelling Scotogramma defessa)
- Scotogramma densa Smith, 1893 (=Scotogramma megaera Smith, 1899)
- Scotogramma fervida Barnes & McDunnough, 1912
- Scotogramma fieldi Barnes & Benjamin, 1926
- Scotogramma gatei (Smith, 1910)
- Scotogramma harnardi Barnes & Benjamin, 1924
- Scotogramma hirsuta McDunnough, 1938
- Scotogramma mendosica Hampson, 1905
- Scotogramma orida (Smith, 1903)
- Scotogramma ptilodonta (Grote, 1883)
- Scotogramma stretchii H. Edwards, 1887
- Scotogramma submarina (Grote, 1883) (=Scotogramma addenda Barnes & Benjamin, 1924)
- Scotogramma yakima (Smith, 1900)
