= Properigea mephisto =

Scientific classification
- Kingdom: Animalia
- Phylum: Arthropoda
- Clade: Pancrustacea
- Class: Insecta
- Order: Lepidoptera
- Superfamily: Noctuoidea
- Family: Noctuidae
- Genus: Properigea
- Species: P. mephisto

Binomial name
- Properigea mephisto (A. Blanchard, 1968)

Synonyms
- Neperigea mephisto Blanchard, 1968

Species of moth

Properigea mephisto is a species of cutworm or dart moth in the family Noctuidae. It is found in North America, where it has been recorded from Texas, Arizona, and New Mexico. The MONA or Hodges number for Properigea mephisto is 9591.

The wingspan is 26–28 mm (1.0–1.1 in).
