= Hemiplatytes epia =

Scientific classification
- Kingdom: Animalia
- Phylum: Arthropoda
- Class: Insecta
- Order: Lepidoptera
- Family: Crambidae
- Subfamily: Crambinae
- Tribe: incertae sedis
- Genus: Hemiplatytes
- Species: H. epia

Binomial name
- Hemiplatytes epia (Dyar, 1912)

Synonyms
- Diatraea epia Dyar, 1912; Platytes damon Barnes & McDunnough, 1918

Species of moth

Hemiplatytes epia is a moth in the family Crambidae. It was described by Harrison Gray Dyar Jr. in 1912. It has been recorded from the US state of California.

The length of the forewings is 6.5–9 mm for males and 8.5–10 mm for females. Adults are on wing from June to October.
