= Metalectra albilinea =

Scientific classification
- Domain: Eukaryota
- Kingdom: Animalia
- Phylum: Arthropoda
- Class: Insecta
- Order: Lepidoptera
- Superfamily: Noctuoidea
- Family: Erebidae
- Subfamily: Boletobiinae
- Genus: Metalectra
- Species: M. albilinea

Binomial name
- Metalectra albilinea Richards, 1941

Species of moth

Metalectra albilinea, the white-lined fungus moth, is a species of moth in the family Erebidae. It is found in North America.

The MONA or Hodges number for Metalectra albilinea is 8504.
