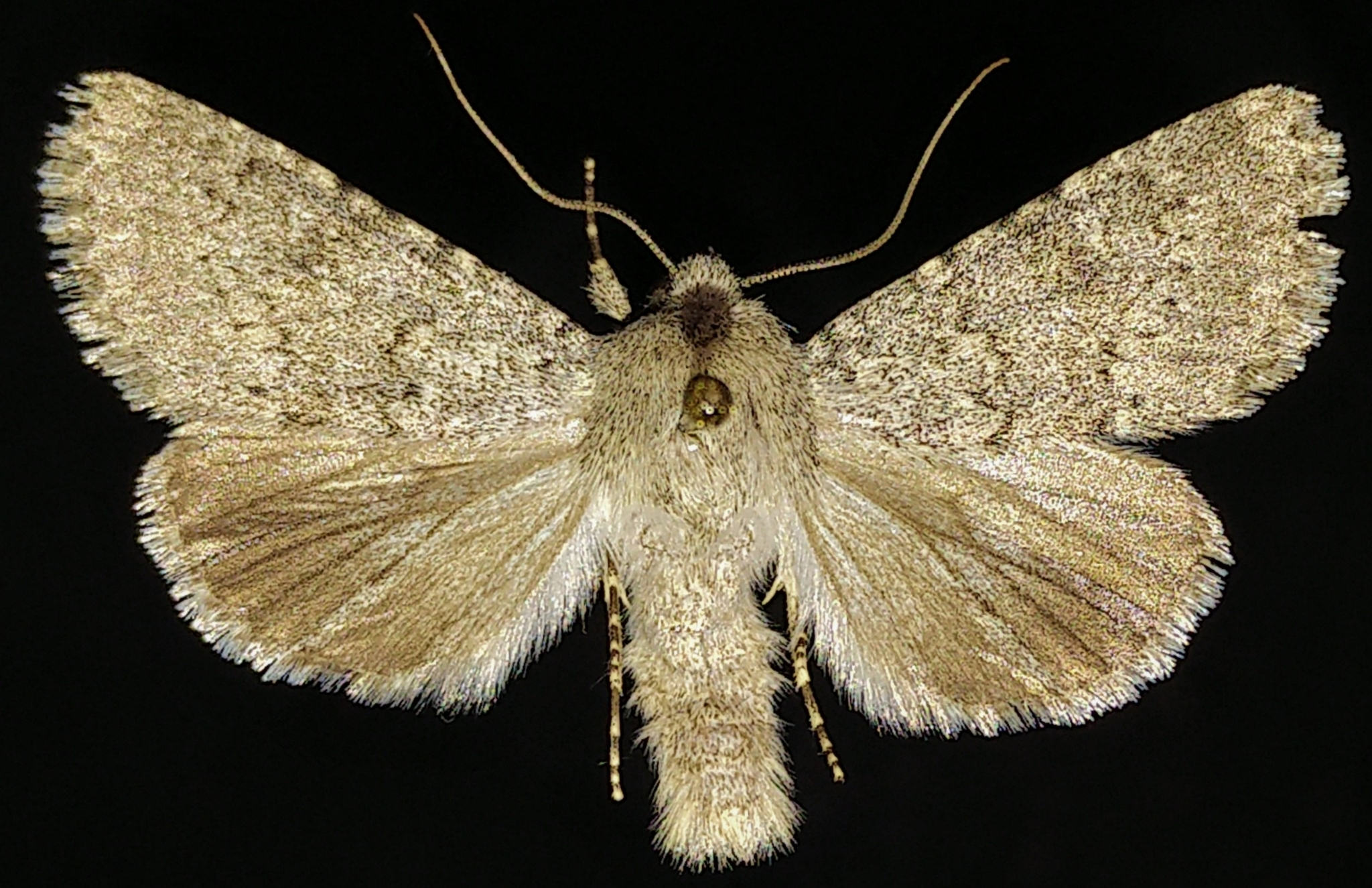

Scientific classification
- Kingdom: Animalia
- Phylum: Arthropoda
- Class: Insecta
- Order: Lepidoptera
- Superfamily: Noctuoidea
- Family: Noctuidae
- Genus: Scotogramma
- Species: S. submarina

Binomial name
- Scotogramma submarina (Grote, 1883)

Synonyms
- Scotogramma addenda Barnes & Benjamin, 1924

= Scotogramma submarina =

Species of moth

Scotogramma submarina is a species of cutworm or dart moth in the family Noctuidae that was first described by Augustus Radcliffe Grote in 1883. It is found in North America.
