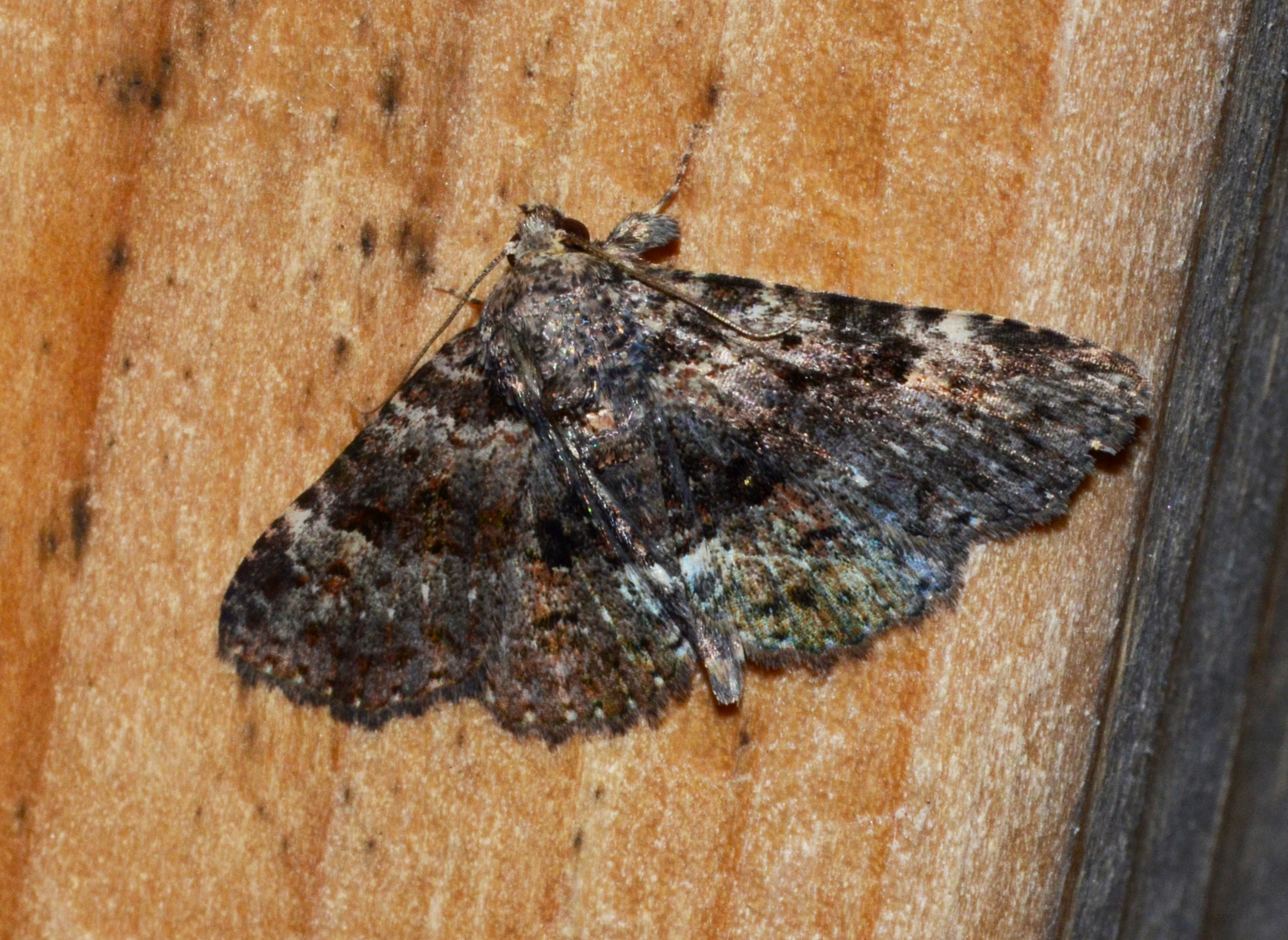
- Metalectra discalis

Scientific classification
- Kingdom: Animalia
- Phylum: Arthropoda
- Clade: Pancrustacea
- Class: Insecta
- Order: Lepidoptera
- Superfamily: Noctuoidea
- Family: Erebidae
- Subfamily: Boletobiinae
- Genus: Metalectra; Hübner, 1823

Synonyms
- Homopyralis Grote, 1875; Stimmia Guenee, 1852

= Metalectra =

Genus of moths

Metalectra is a genus of moths of the family Erebidae described by Jacob Hübner in 1823.

== Taxonomy ==
The genus has previously been classified in the subfamily Catocalinae within the families Erebidae and Noctuidae.

== Species ==
- Metalectra albilinea Richards, 1941
- Metalectra bigallis J.B. Smith, 1908
- Metalectra cinctus J.B. Smith, 1905 (sometimes spelled Metalectra cincta)
- Metalectra diabolica Barnes & Benjamin, 1924 – diabolical fungus moth
- Metalectra discalis Grote, 1876 – common fungus moth
- Metalectra edilis J.B. Smith, 1906
- Metalectra geminicincta Schaus, 1916
- Metalectra miserulata Grote, 1882
- Metalectra quadrisignata Walker, 1858 – four-spotted fungus moth
- Metalectra richardsi Brower, 1941 – Richards' fungus moth
- Metalectra tantillus Grote, 1875 – black fungus moth
