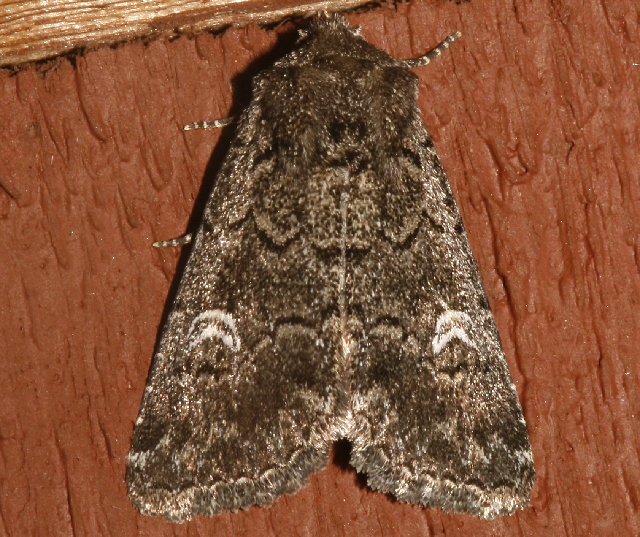

Scientific classification
- Kingdom: Animalia
- Phylum: Arthropoda
- Clade: Pancrustacea
- Class: Insecta
- Order: Lepidoptera
- Superfamily: Noctuoidea
- Family: Noctuidae
- Genus: Properigea
- Species: P. niveirena

Binomial name
- Properigea niveirena (Harvey, 1876)

Synonyms
- Perigea niveirena Harvey, 1876; Oncocnemis pohono Smith, 1899

= Properigea niveirena =

Species of moth

Properigea niveirena is a species of moth in the family Noctuidae. It was described by Leon F. Harvey in 1876 and is found in North America, where it ranges from Vancouver Island, through western British Columbia, Washington and Oregon south to California and the border with Mexico, then east to New Mexico through southern Arizona.

The wingspan is 28–32 mm. Adults are on wing from July to early August.

The larvae probably feed on herbaceous plants.

The MONA or Hodges number for Properigea niveirena is 9596.
