= Calophasia barthae =

Scientific classification
- Domain: Eukaryota
- Kingdom: Animalia
- Phylum: Arthropoda
- Class: Insecta
- Order: Lepidoptera
- Superfamily: Noctuoidea
- Family: Noctuidae
- Genus: Calophasia
- Species: C. barthae

Binomial name
- Calophasia barthae Wagner, 1929

Species of moth

Calophasia barthae is a moth of the family Noctuidae. The species was first described by Wagner in 1929. It is found in the southern part of the Balkans, Turkey and the Middle East.

Adults are on wing in March. There is one generation per year.
