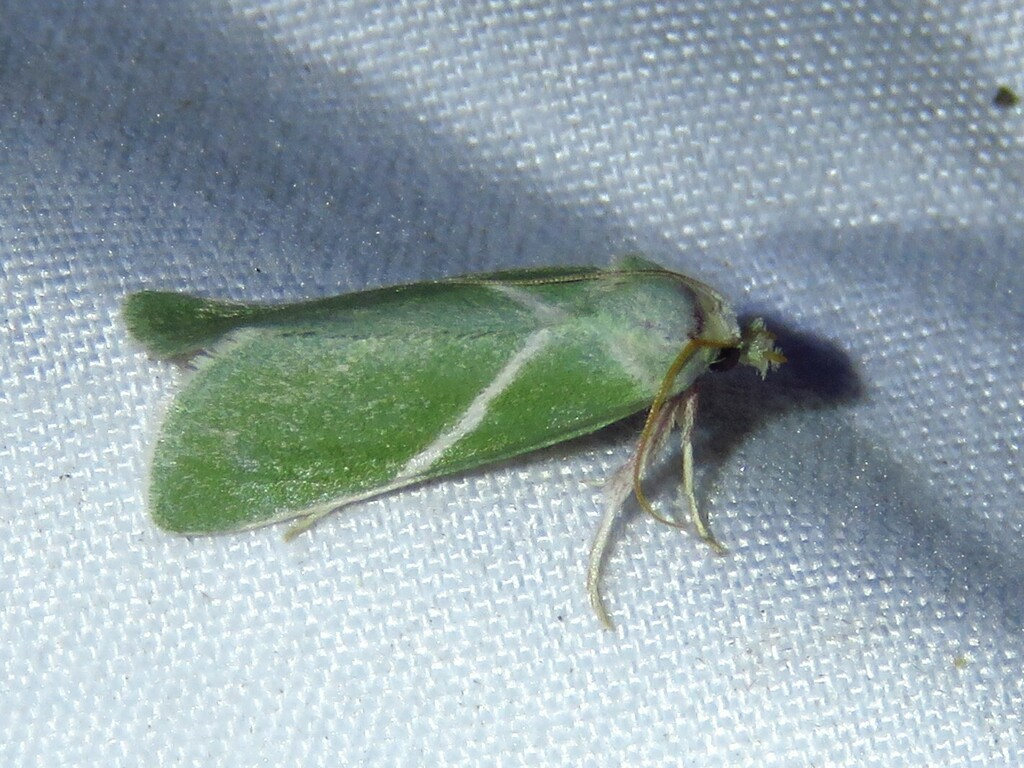

Scientific classification
- Domain: Eukaryota
- Kingdom: Animalia
- Phylum: Arthropoda
- Class: Insecta
- Order: Lepidoptera
- Family: Pyralidae
- Genus: Anemosella
- Species: A. obliquata

Binomial name
- Anemosella obliquata (H. Edwards, 1886)

Synonyms
- Earias obliquata H. Edwards, 1886; Chalinitis albistrigalis Barnes & McDunnough, 1913

= Anemosella obliquata =

Species of moth

Anemosella obliquata is a species of snout moth in the genus Anemosella. It was described by Henry Edwards in 1886, and is known from the US state of Texas.
