= Catabenoides vitrinus =

Scientific classification
- Kingdom: Animalia
- Phylum: Arthropoda
- Class: Insecta
- Order: Lepidoptera
- Superfamily: Noctuoidea
- Family: Noctuidae
- Genus: Catabenoides
- Species: C. vitrinus

Binomial name
- Catabenoides vitrinus (Walker, 1857)

Synonyms
- Catabena vitrina (Walker, 1857); Laphygma vitrina Walker, 1857

Species of moth

Catabenoides vitrinus is a species of moth in the family Noctuidae that first described by Francis Walker in 1857. It is found from the south-western US (California to western Texas) and south through Mexico to Central America. It is also found in the Caribbean, including Cuba.

The wingspan is 22–26 mm.
