= Stylopoda modestella =

Scientific classification
- Kingdom: Animalia
- Phylum: Arthropoda
- Clade: Pancrustacea
- Class: Insecta
- Order: Lepidoptera
- Superfamily: Noctuoidea
- Family: Noctuidae
- Genus: Stylopoda
- Species: S. modestella

Binomial name
- Stylopoda modestella (Barnes & McDunnough, 1918)

Species of moth

Stylopoda modestella is a species of moth in the family Noctuidae (the owlet moths). It was first described by William Barnes and James Halliday McDunnough in 1918 and it is found in North America.

The MONA or Hodges number for Stylopoda modestella is 10166.
