= Hemiplatytes prosenes =

Scientific classification
- Kingdom: Animalia
- Phylum: Arthropoda
- Clade: Pancrustacea
- Class: Insecta
- Order: Lepidoptera
- Family: Crambidae
- Subfamily: Crambinae
- Tribe: incertae sedis
- Genus: Hemiplatytes
- Species: H. prosenes

Binomial name
- Hemiplatytes prosenes (Dyar, 1912)

Synonyms
- Diatraea prosenes Dyar, 1912; Alamogordia prosenes

Species of moth

Hemiplatytes prosenes is a moth in the family Crambidae. It was described by Harrison Gray Dyar Jr. in 1912. It has been recorded from the US states of California, Colorado and Utah.

The wingspan is about 22 mm. Adults are on wing from June to September.
