= Properigea suffusa =

Scientific classification
- Domain: Eukaryota
- Kingdom: Animalia
- Phylum: Arthropoda
- Class: Insecta
- Order: Lepidoptera
- Superfamily: Noctuoidea
- Family: Noctuidae
- Genus: Properigea
- Species: P. suffusa

Binomial name
- Properigea suffusa (Barnes & McDunnough, 1912)

Species of moth

Properigea suffusa is a species of cutworm or dart moth in the family Noctuidae. It was first described by William Barnes and James Halliday McDunnough in 1912 and it is found in North America.

The MONA or Hodges number for Properigea suffusa is 9594.
