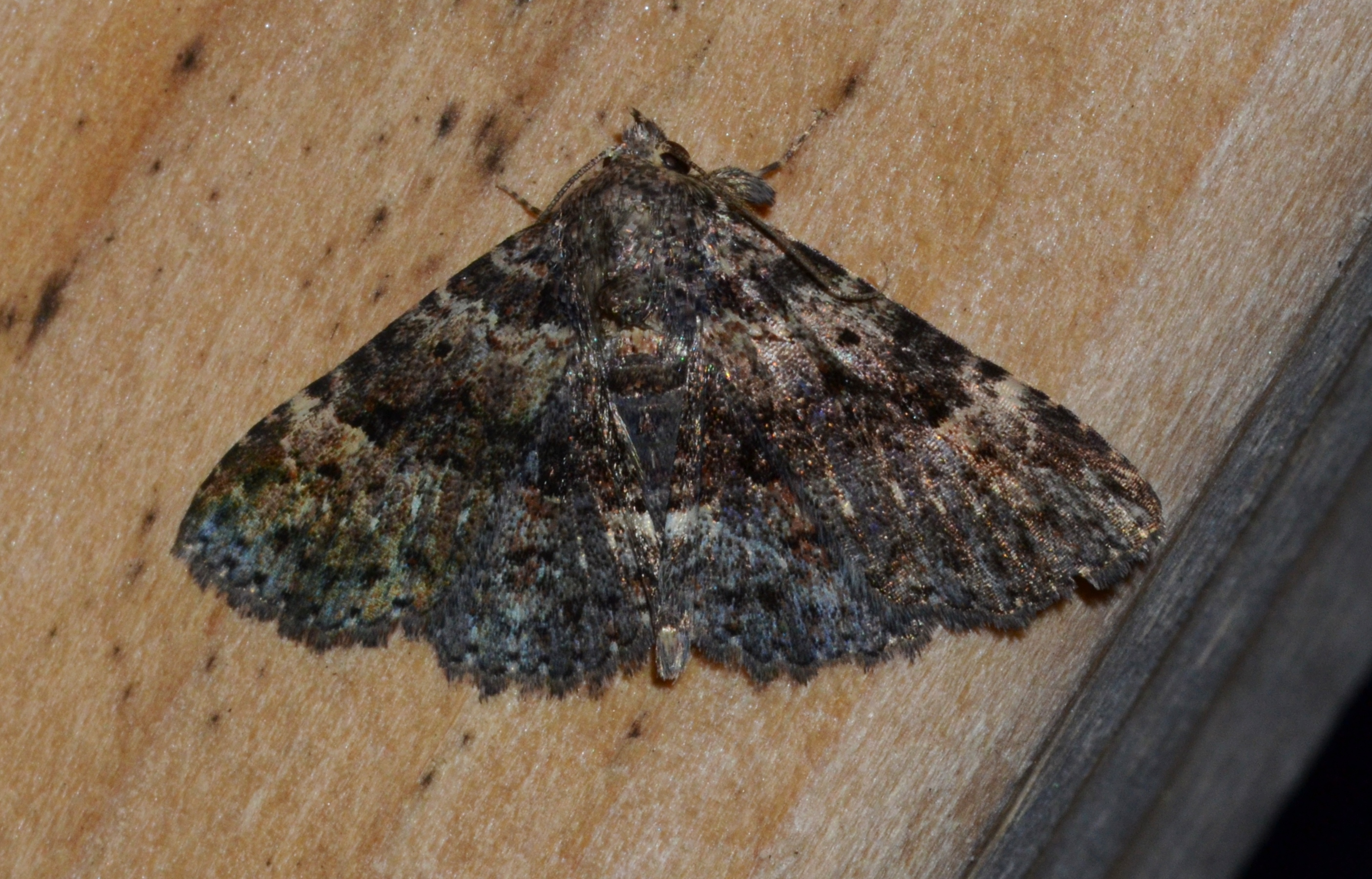

Scientific classification
- Kingdom: Animalia
- Phylum: Arthropoda
- Class: Insecta
- Order: Lepidoptera
- Superfamily: Noctuoidea
- Family: Erebidae
- Genus: Metalectra
- Species: M. discalis

Binomial name
- Metalectra discalis (Grote, 1876)

= Metalectra discalis =

Species of moth

Metalectra discalis, the common fungus moth, is a moth of the family Erebidae. The species was first described by Augustus Radcliffe Grote in 1876. It is found in North America from Wisconsin to Quebec and Maine, south to Florida, west to Texas and Missouri, north to Ontario.

The wingspan is 20–29 mm. Adults are on wing from May to September in the south and from June to August in the north. There are probably two or more generations per year.

Larvae have been recorded on bracket fungi and probably feed on other persistent fungi as well.
