= Metalectra bigallis =

Scientific classification
- Kingdom: Animalia
- Phylum: Arthropoda
- Class: Insecta
- Order: Lepidoptera
- Superfamily: Noctuoidea
- Family: Erebidae
- Genus: Metalectra
- Species: M. bigallis

Binomial name
- Metalectra bigallis (Smith, 1908)

Species of moth

Metalectra bigallis is a species of moth in the family Erebidae. It is found in North America.

The MONA or Hodges number for Metalectra bigallis is 8501.
