= Comadia henrici =

Scientific classification
- Kingdom: Animalia
- Phylum: Arthropoda
- Class: Insecta
- Order: Lepidoptera
- Family: Cossidae
- Genus: Comadia
- Species: C. henrici

Binomial name
- Comadia henrici (Grote, 1882)

Synonyms
- Hypopta henrici Grote, 1882

Species of moth

Comadia henrici is a moth in the family Cossidae. It is found in North America, where it has been recorded from California, Arizona, New Mexico, Colorado, Nevada and Utah.

The wingspan is 12–15 mm for males and 16–20 mm for females. Adults have been recorded on wing from March to July.
