= Comadia speratus =

Scientific classification
- Domain: Eukaryota
- Kingdom: Animalia
- Phylum: Arthropoda
- Class: Insecta
- Order: Lepidoptera
- Family: Cossidae
- Genus: Comadia
- Species: C. speratus

Binomial name
- Comadia speratus Brown, 1976

Species of moth

Comadia speratus is a moth in the family Cossidae. It is found in North America, where it has been recorded from California.

The forewing is about 15 mm. Adults have been recorded on wing in May.
