= Comadia albistrigata =

Scientific classification
- Domain: Eukaryota
- Kingdom: Animalia
- Phylum: Arthropoda
- Class: Insecta
- Order: Lepidoptera
- Family: Cossidae
- Genus: Comadia
- Species: C. albistrigata

Binomial name
- Comadia albistrigata (Barnes & McDunnough, 1918)

Synonyms
- Heterocoma albistriga Barnes & McDunnough, 1918; Comadia albistriga (Barnes & McDunnough, 1918)

Species of moth

Comadia albistrigata is a moth in the family Cossidae first described by William Barnes and James Halliday McDunnough in 1918. It is found in North America, where it has been recorded from Arizona, New Mexico and Texas.

The length of the forewings is 11–14 mm for males and about 13 mm for females. The forewing costa has brown checks, the subcosta is creamy white without checks and the discal area is mouse brown. The hindwings are uniform mouse brown. Adults have been recorded on wing from May to June.
