= Scotogramma ptilodonta =

Scientific classification
- Kingdom: Animalia
- Phylum: Arthropoda
- Class: Insecta
- Order: Lepidoptera
- Superfamily: Noctuoidea
- Family: Noctuidae
- Genus: Scotogramma
- Species: S. ptilodonta

Binomial name
- Scotogramma ptilodonta (Grote, 1883)

Species of moth

Scotogramma ptilodonta is a species of cutworm or dart moth in the family Noctuidae. It is found in North America.

The MONA or Hodges number for Scotogramma ptilodonta is 10244.

== Subspecies ==
These three subspecies belong to the species Scotogramma ptilodonta:

- Scotogramma ptilodonta albescens McDunnough, 1943
- Scotogramma ptilodonta nevada Barnes & McDunnough, 1912
- Scotogramma ptilodonta ptilodonta
