= Comadia alleni =

Scientific classification
- Domain: Eukaryota
- Kingdom: Animalia
- Phylum: Arthropoda
- Class: Insecta
- Order: Lepidoptera
- Family: Cossidae
- Genus: Comadia
- Species: C. alleni

Binomial name
- Comadia alleni Brown, 1976

Species of moth

Comadia alleni is a moth in the family Cossidae. It is found in North America, where it has been recorded from California.

The length of the forewings is 17–18 millimetres (0.67–0.71 in). Adults have been recorded on wing from May to June.
