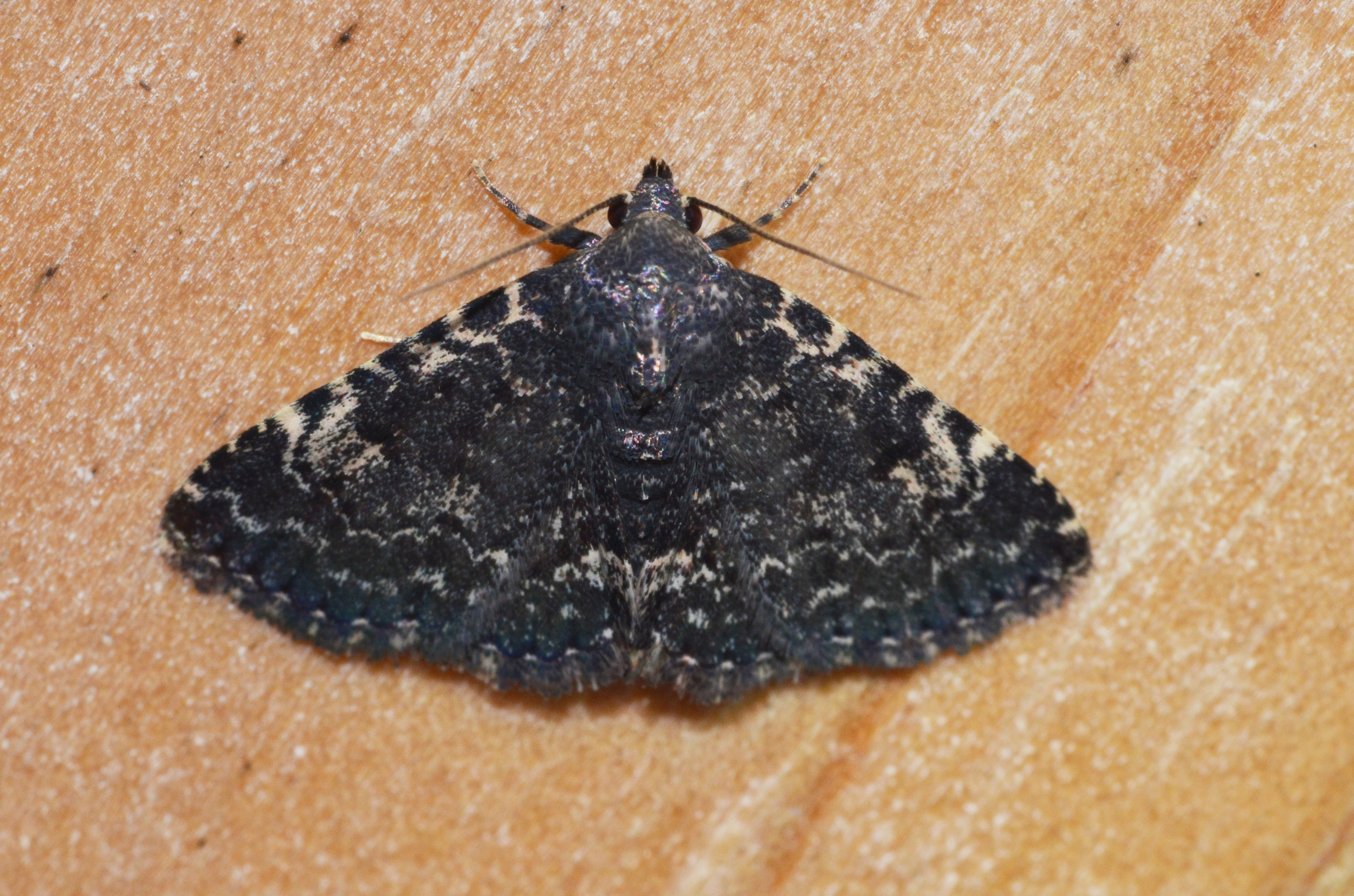

Scientific classification
- Kingdom: Animalia
- Phylum: Arthropoda
- Class: Insecta
- Order: Lepidoptera
- Superfamily: Noctuoidea
- Family: Erebidae
- Genus: Metalectra
- Species: M. tantillus

Binomial name
- Metalectra tantillus (Grote, 1874)

Synonyms
- Homopyralis tantillus Grote, 1874; Homopyralis monodia Dyar, 1903

= Metalectra tantillus =

Species of moth

Metalectra tantillus, the black fungus moth, is a moth of the family Erebidae. The species was first described by Augustus Radcliffe Grote in 1874. It has been recorded from the US states of Alabama, Florida, Georgia, Illinois, Iowa, Kentucky, Maryland, Mississippi, New Jersey, North Carolina, Ohio, Oklahoma, Pennsylvania, South Carolina, Tennessee, Texas, West Virginia and Wisconsin.

The wingspan is about 25 mm. Adults have been recorded on wing from January to October, with most records from April to August.
