= Catabenoides divisa =

Scientific classification
- Kingdom: Animalia
- Phylum: Arthropoda
- Class: Insecta
- Order: Lepidoptera
- Superfamily: Noctuoidea
- Family: Noctuidae
- Genus: Catabenoides
- Species: C. divisa

Binomial name
- Catabenoides divisa (Herrich-Schäffer, 1868)

Synonyms
- Catabenoides candida (Smith, 1900); Catabenoides insularis Troubridge, 2020; Catabenoides terminellus (Grote, 1883)

Species of moth

Catabenoides divisa is a species of moth in the family Noctuidae (the owlet moths). It is found in North America.
