= Anemosella =

Scientific classification
- Kingdom: Animalia
- Phylum: Arthropoda
- Clade: Pancrustacea
- Class: Insecta
- Order: Lepidoptera
- Family: Pyralidae
- Subfamily: Chrysauginae
- Genus: Anemosella; Dyar, 1914

Synonyms
- Balidarcha Dyar, 1914

Genus of moths

Anemosella is a genus of snout moths. It was described by Harrison Gray Dyar Jr. in 1914.

== Species ==
- Anemosella basalis Dyar, 1914
- Anemosella nevalis (Barnes & Benjamin, 1925)
- Anemosella obliquata (H. Edwards, 1886)
- Anemosella polingalis Barnes & Benjamin, 1926
- Anemosella viridalis (Barnes & McDunnough, 1912)
