= Anemosella viridalis =

Scientific classification
- Domain: Eukaryota
- Kingdom: Animalia
- Phylum: Arthropoda
- Class: Insecta
- Order: Lepidoptera
- Family: Pyralidae
- Genus: Anemosella
- Species: A. viridalis

Binomial name
- Anemosella viridalis (Barnes & McDunnough, 1912)

Synonyms
- Chalinitis viridalis Barnes & McDunnough, 1912; Balidarcha cuis Dyar, 1914

Species of moth

Anemosella viridalis is a species of snout moth in the genus Anemosella. It was described by William Barnes and James Halliday McDunnough in 1912, and is known from Mexico and the US state of Arizona.

The wingspan is about 16 mm.
