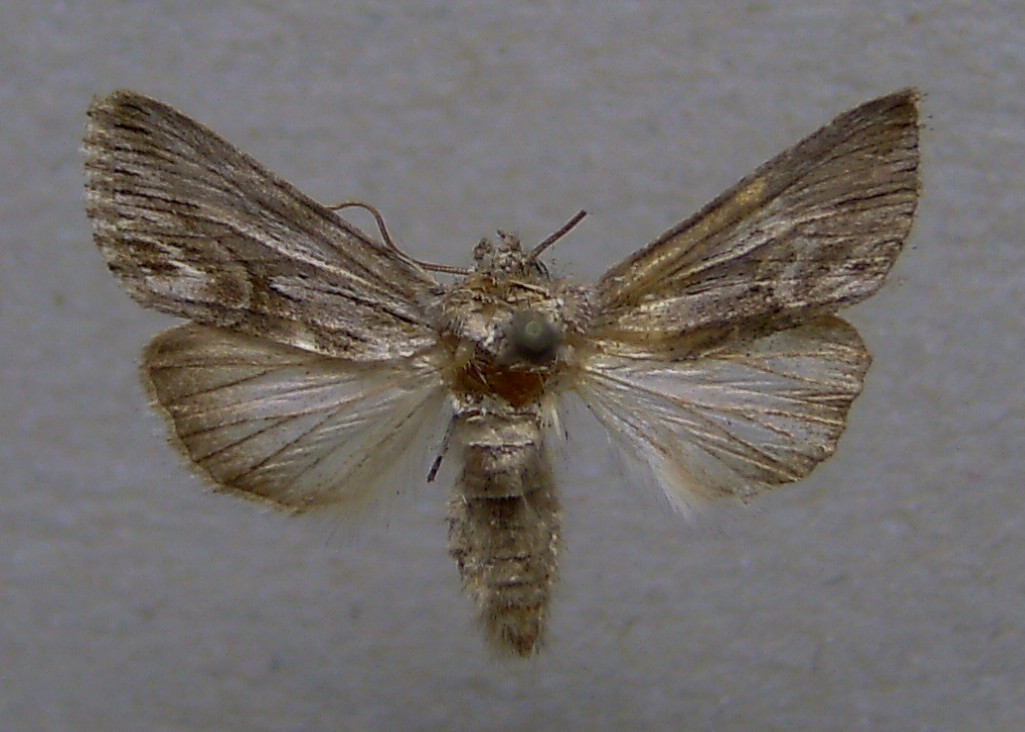

Scientific classification
- Domain: Eukaryota
- Kingdom: Animalia
- Phylum: Arthropoda
- Class: Insecta
- Order: Lepidoptera
- Superfamily: Noctuoidea
- Family: Noctuidae
- Genus: Calophasia
- Species: C. platyptera

Binomial name
- Calophasia platyptera (Esper, [1788])

Synonyms
- Phalaena (Noctua) platyptera Esper, 1788; Phalaena (Noctua) platyptera Esper, 1796; Phalaena (Noctua) canterius Villers, 1789; Noctua tenera Hübner, [1803]; Cleophana olbiena Duponchel, 1842; Calophasia platyptera var. subalbida Staudinger, 1901

= Calophasia platyptera =

Antirrhinum brocade

Species of moth

Calophasia platyptera, the antirrhinum brocade, is a moth of the family Noctuidae. The species was first described by Eugenius Johann Christoph Esper in 1788. It is found in Europe, the Near East, the western Sahara, Morocco, Algeria and Tunisia.

== Technical description and variation ==
C. platyptera Esp. (= canterius Vill., tenera Hbn.) (29 b). Forewing pale grey, with slight partial darker dusting; the veins finely dark; a thin black streak on submedian fold from base traversing a faintly paler claviform stigma; lines marked by oblique costal strigae and double curved marks on inner margin, the outer line there preceded by a curved dark grey cloud; terminal area with a double series of black streaks in the intervals interrupted by a pale submarginal line; fringe chequered fuscous and grey; hindwing dingy grey in female, whitish in male; the terminal half fuscous in female, reduced to a narrow grey border in male— ab. subalbida Stgr. (29 c), (queried by him as possibly only the summer brood) from Sicily and Algeria is much whiter, the dark markings of the forewing obsolescent; the hindwing nearly wholly white; — olbiena Dup. (29 c) has the dark markings of forewing intensified and blackish brown. Larva like that of lunula, whitish with yellow lines and transverse black blotches; but these are smaller and more numerous, and the yellow lines are more interrupted at the segmental incisions The wingspan is about 30 mm.

== Biology ==
Adults are on wing from early spring to November. There are multiple generations per year.

The larvae feed on the flowers and leaves of Antirrhinum and Linaria species.

== Gallery ==
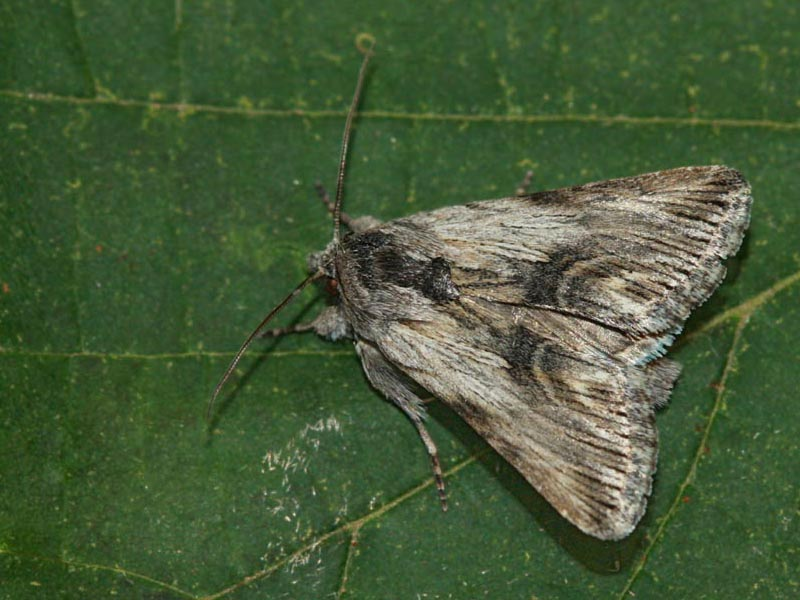
Imago

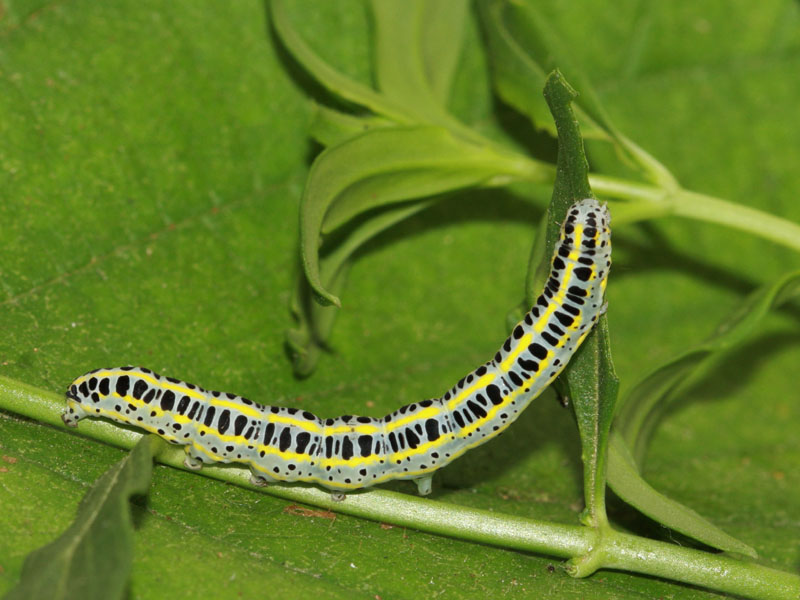
larva

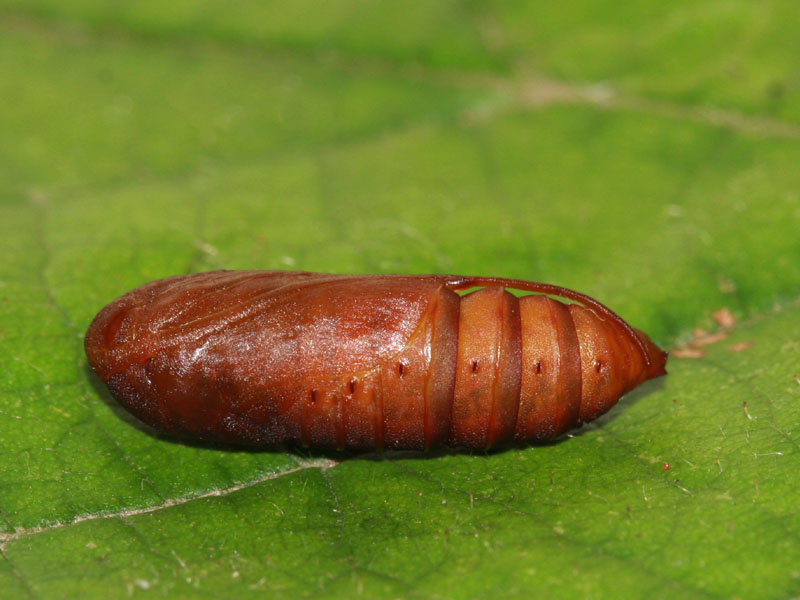
pupa
