= Stylopoda groteana =

Scientific classification
- Kingdom: Animalia
- Phylum: Arthropoda
- Class: Insecta
- Order: Lepidoptera
- Superfamily: Noctuoidea
- Family: Noctuidae
- Genus: Stylopoda
- Species: S. groteana

Binomial name
- Stylopoda groteana (Dyar, 1903)

Species of moth

Stylopoda groteana is a species of moth in the family Noctuidae (the owlet moths). It is found in North America.

The MONA or Hodges number for Stylopoda groteana is 10165.
