= Stylopoda cephalica =

Scientific classification
- Domain: Eukaryota
- Kingdom: Animalia
- Phylum: Arthropoda
- Class: Insecta
- Order: Lepidoptera
- Superfamily: Noctuoidea
- Family: Noctuidae
- Genus: Stylopoda
- Species: S. cephalica

Binomial name
- Stylopoda cephalica Smith, 1891

Species of moth

Stylopoda cephalica is a species of moth in the family Noctuidae (the owlet moths). It is found in North America.

The MONA or Hodges number for Stylopoda cephalica is 10163.
