= Metalectra miserulata =

Scientific classification
- Kingdom: Animalia
- Phylum: Arthropoda
- Class: Insecta
- Order: Lepidoptera
- Superfamily: Noctuoidea
- Family: Erebidae
- Genus: Metalectra
- Species: M. miserulata

Binomial name
- Metalectra miserulata (Grote, 1882)

Species of moth

Metalectra miserulata is a species of moth in the family Erebidae. It is found in North America.

The MONA or Hodges number for Metalectra miserulata is 8506.
