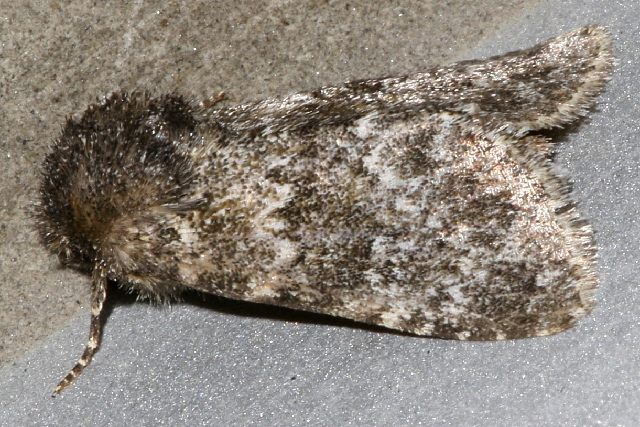

Scientific classification
- Kingdom: Animalia
- Phylum: Arthropoda
- Class: Insecta
- Order: Lepidoptera
- Superfamily: Noctuoidea
- Family: Noctuidae
- Tribe: Xylenini
- Genus: Pseudobryomima
- Species: P. muscosa

Binomial name
- Pseudobryomima muscosa (Hampson, 1906)

= Pseudobryomima muscosa =

Species of moth

Pseudobryomima muscosa, the mossy pseudobryomima, is a species of cutworm or dart moth in the family Noctuidae. It is found in North America.

The MONA or Hodges number for Pseudobryomima muscosa is 9599.
