= Properigea tapeta =

Scientific classification
- Domain: Eukaryota
- Kingdom: Animalia
- Phylum: Arthropoda
- Class: Insecta
- Order: Lepidoptera
- Superfamily: Noctuoidea
- Family: Noctuidae
- Tribe: Xylenini
- Genus: Properigea
- Species: P. tapeta

Binomial name
- Properigea tapeta (Smith, 1900)

Species of moth

Properigea tapeta is a species of cutworm or dart moth in the family Noctuidae.

The MONA or Hodges number for Properigea tapeta is 9592.
