= Calophasia sinaica =

Scientific classification
- Kingdom: Animalia
- Phylum: Arthropoda
- Class: Insecta
- Order: Lepidoptera
- Superfamily: Noctuoidea
- Family: Noctuidae
- Genus: Calophasia
- Species: C. sinaica

Binomial name
- Calophasia sinaica (Wiltshire, 1948)

Species of moth

Calophasia sinaica is a moth of the family Noctuidae first described by Wiltshire in 1948. It is found in the eremic (desert) parts of Africa extending north to the Levant.

Adults are on wing from October to March. There is one generation per year.
