= Hemiplatytes parallela =

Scientific classification
- Domain: Eukaryota
- Kingdom: Animalia
- Phylum: Arthropoda
- Class: Insecta
- Order: Lepidoptera
- Family: Crambidae
- Subfamily: Crambinae
- Tribe: incertae sedis
- Genus: Hemiplatytes
- Species: H. parallela

Binomial name
- Hemiplatytes parallela (Kearfott, 1908)

Synonyms
- Diatraea parallela Kearfott, 1908

Species of moth

Hemiplatytes parallela is a moth in the family Crambidae. It was described by William D. Kearfott in 1908. It is found in the US states of Arizona and New Mexico.
