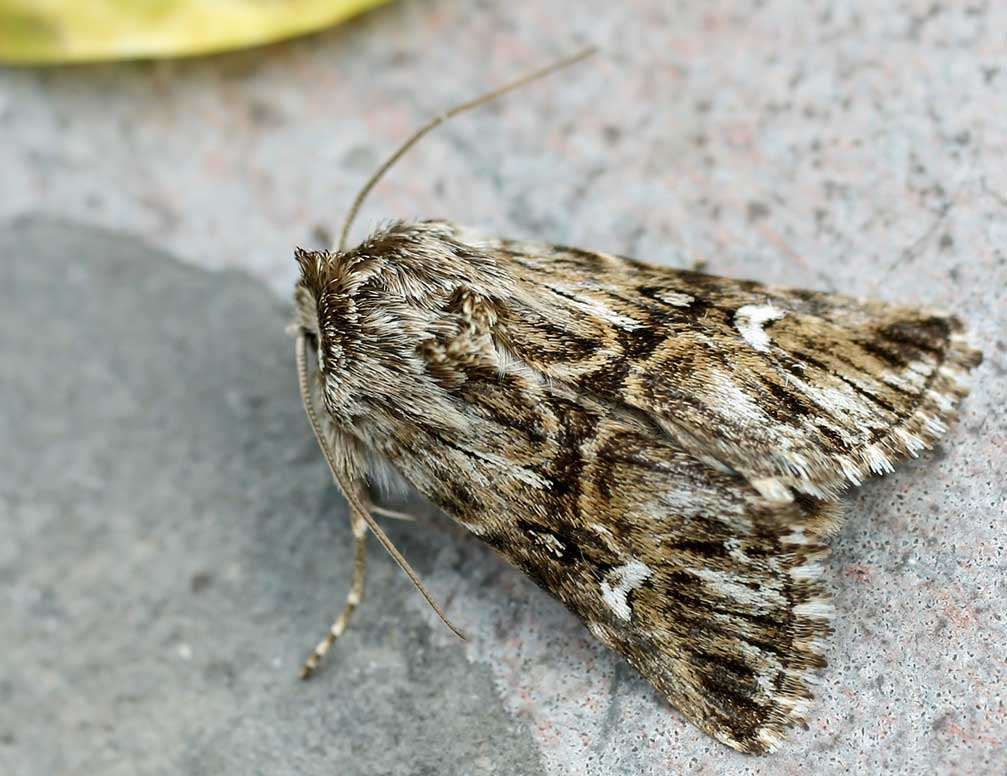
- Calophasia lunula

Scientific classification
- Domain: Eukaryota
- Kingdom: Animalia
- Phylum: Arthropoda
- Class: Insecta
- Order: Lepidoptera
- Superfamily: Noctuoidea
- Family: Noctuidae
- Subfamily: Cuculliinae
- Genus: Calophasia; Stephens, 1829

= Calophasia =

Genus of moths

Calophasia is a genus of moths of the family Noctuidae.

== Species ==
- Calophasia almoravida Graslin, 1863
- Calophasia angularis (Chrétien, 1911)
- Calophasia barthae Wagner, 1929
- Calophasia hamifera Staudinger, 1863
- Calophasia lunula – toadflax brocade Hufnagel, 1766
- Calophasia opalina Esper, 1793
- Calophasia platyptera Esper, 1788
- Calophasia sinaica (Wiltshire, 1948)
