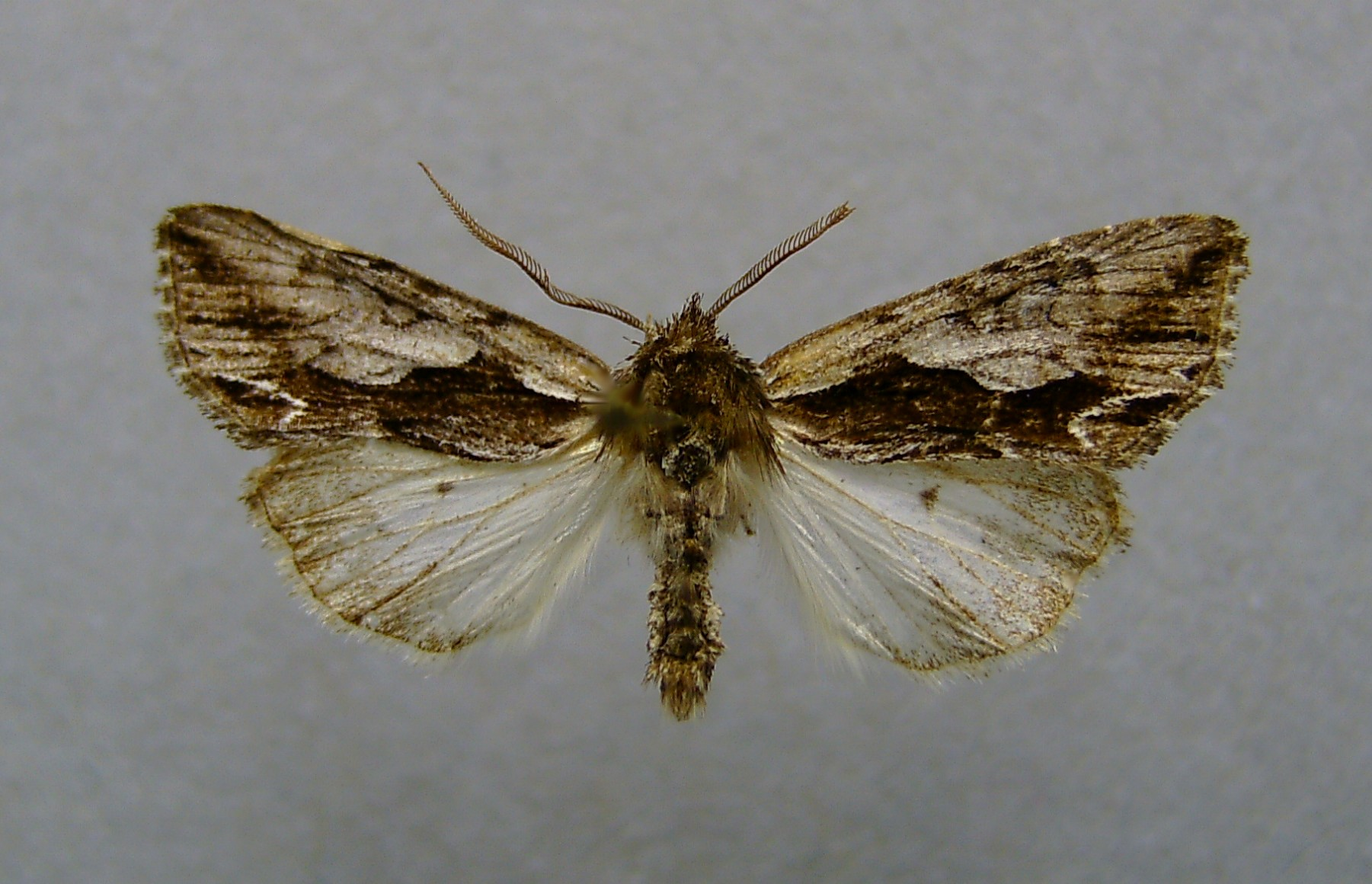

Scientific classification
- Domain: Eukaryota
- Kingdom: Animalia
- Phylum: Arthropoda
- Class: Insecta
- Order: Lepidoptera
- Superfamily: Noctuoidea
- Family: Noctuidae
- Genus: Calliergis
- Species: C. ramosa

Binomial name
- Calliergis ramosa (Esper, 1786)

Synonyms
- Callierges ramosa; Bombyx ramosa Esper, 1786; Lithocampa ramosa (Esper, 1786)

= Calliergis ramosa =

Species of moth

Calliergis ramosa is a moth of the family Noctuidae first described by Eugenius Johann Christoph Esper in 1786. It is found in central and southern Europe, from France north to the Netherlands, east to Poland, south through eastern Europe to Greece.

The larvae feed on Lonicera species.

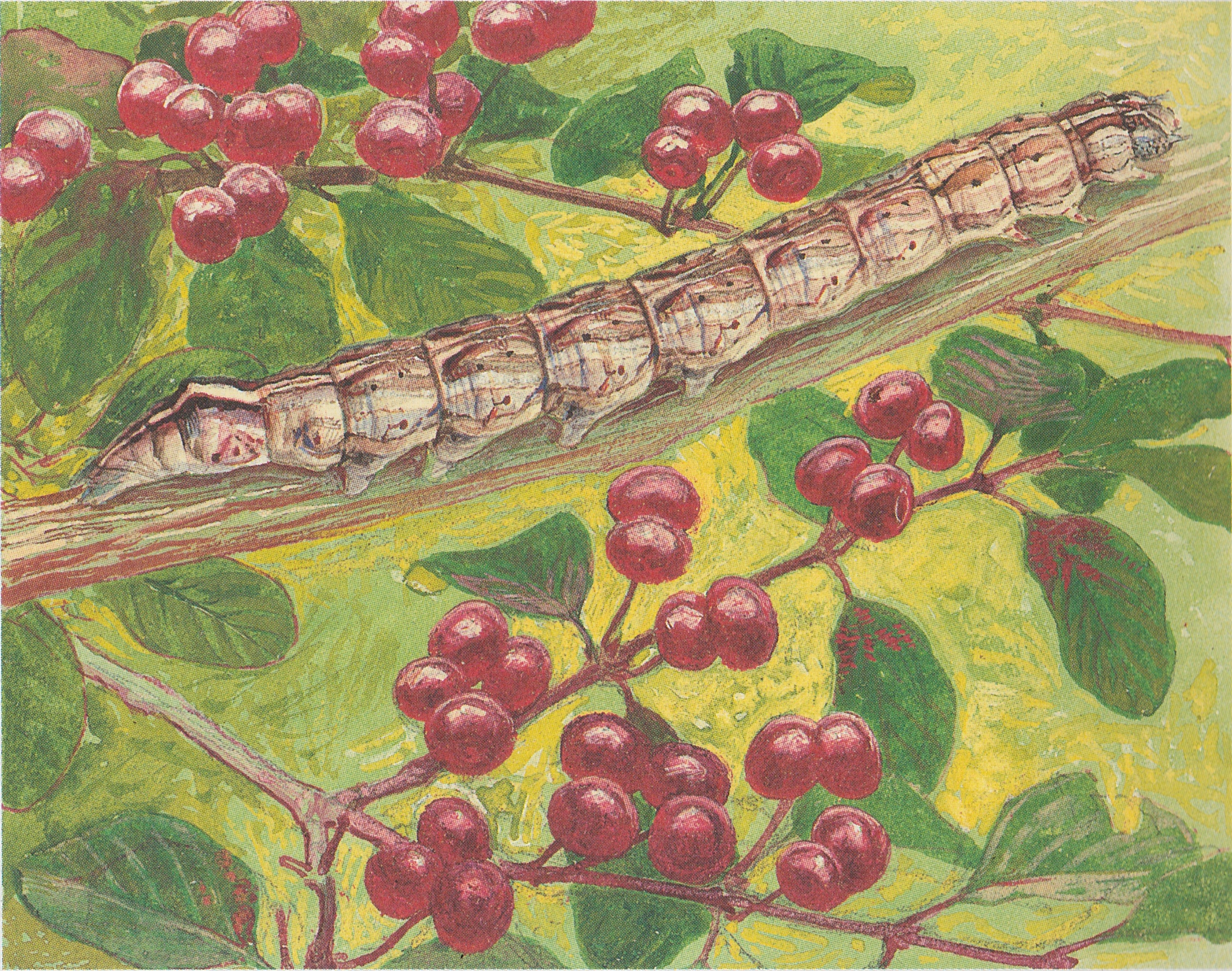
Drawing of the caterpillar (fourfold enlarged) on Lonicera xylosteum
