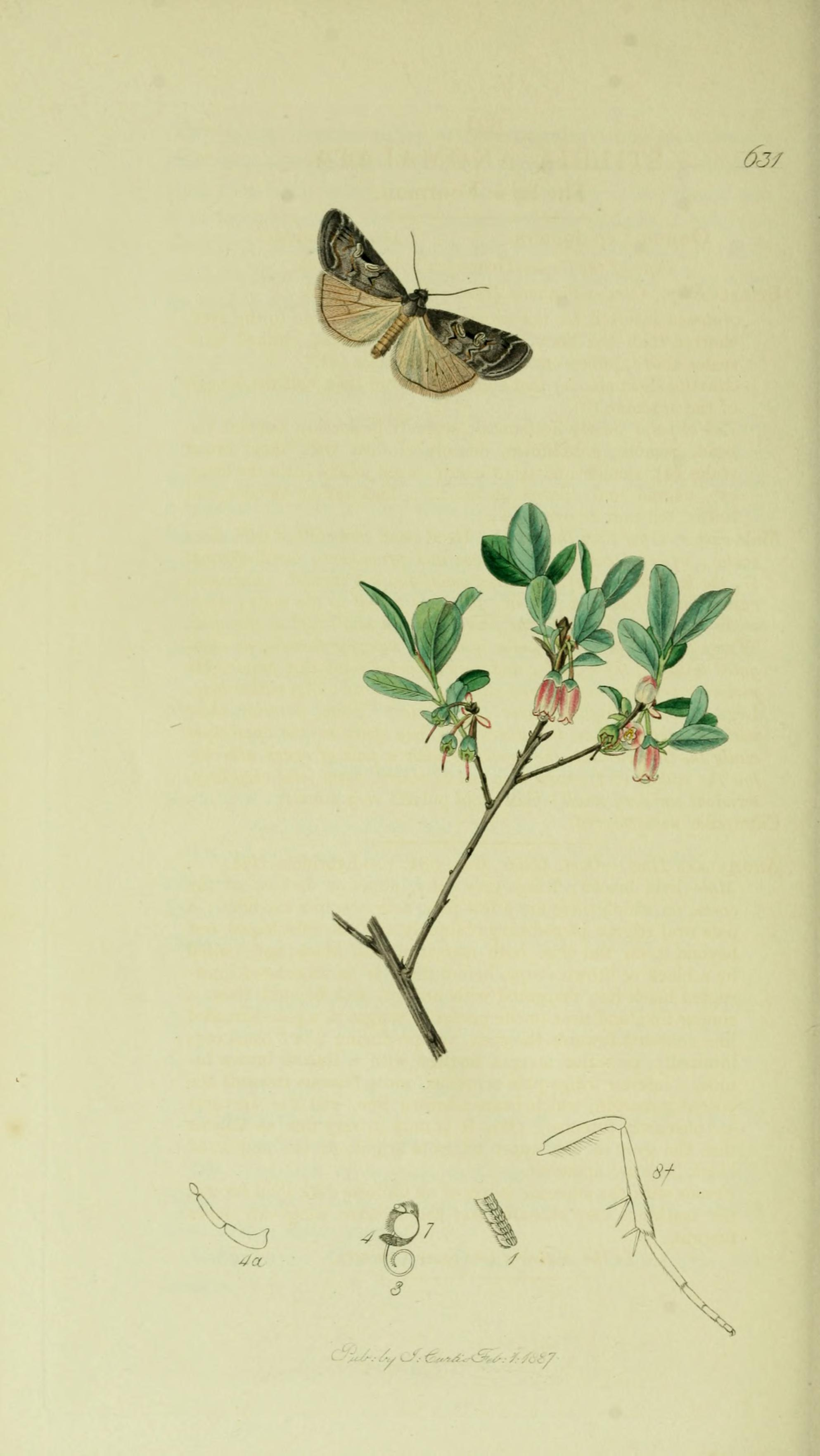

Scientific classification
- Kingdom: Animalia
- Phylum: Arthropoda
- Clade: Pancrustacea
- Class: Insecta
- Order: Lepidoptera
- Superfamily: Noctuoidea
- Family: Noctuidae
- Genus: Stilbia
- Species: S. anomala

Binomial name
- Stilbia anomala (Haworth, 1812)

Synonyms
- Phytometra anomala Haworth, 1812; Stilbia anomalata

= Stilbia anomala =

Species of moth

Stilbia anomala, the false footman or anomalous, is a moth of the family Noctuidae. It is found in parts of western Europe.

== Technical description and variation ==
The wingspan is 29–36 mm. Forewing grey, shining; the costa suffused with dark fuscous; inner and outer lines double, blackish, filled in with whitish, irregularly dentate; subterminal pale with suffusedly darker edges; orbicular and reniform stigmata with pale annuli externally dark margined, separated by a diffuse dark shade, the former oblique and narrow; hindwing white tinged with brown along termen; in the female the forewing is more uniformly blackish fuscous; — the form philopalis Grasl. (Note: now species Stilbia philopalis (Graslin, 1852)), from S. E. France, is smaller, paler, with the markings showing up more prominently; - andalusica Stgr. (Note: now species Stilbia andalusiaca (Staudinger, 1892)), a Spanish form, is also smaller than the typical, but with less distinct lines and markings; — in syriaca Stgr., (Note: now species Stilbia syriaca (Staudinger, 1892)) from Asia Minor, the wings are broader, the hindwing as well being much darker; calberlae Failla-Ted. (Note: now species Stilbia calberlae (Failla-Tedaldi, 1890)), from Sicily, is certainly a good aberration: the males are blacker in forewing than the darkest female of the typical form, with the hindwing brightly white.

== Biology ==
Adults are on wing from August to September.

Larva green to pale brown; dorsal and subdorsal lines yellowish white, with dark margins;spiracular whitish, with the upper edge grey. The larvae feed on various grasses, including Deschampsia flexuosa.

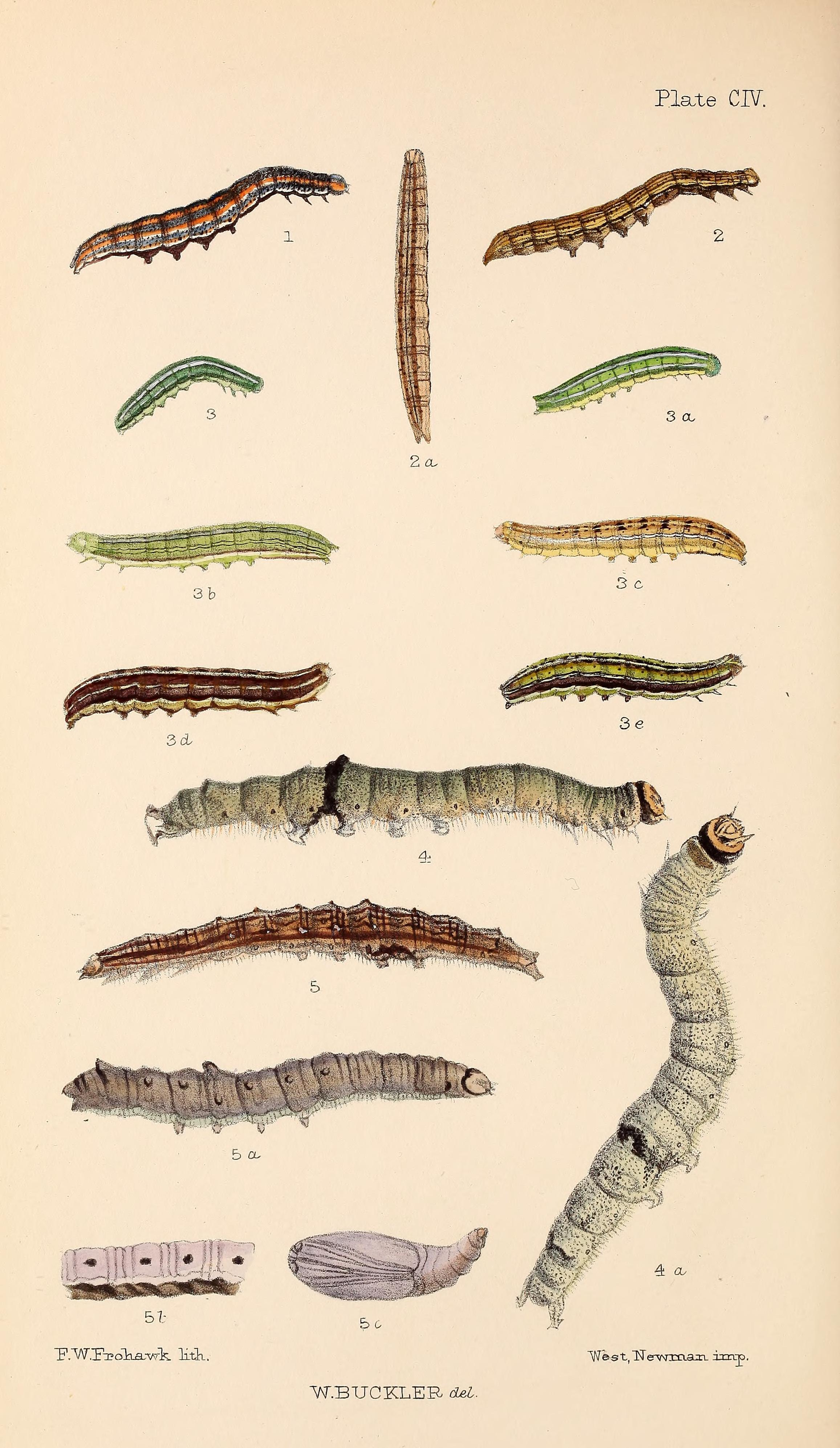
Figs..3, 3a, 3b, 3c,3d, larvae in various stages 3b, 3c,3d, 3e larvae after last moult
