= Stilbia =

Scientific classification
- Kingdom: Animalia
- Phylum: Arthropoda
- Class: Insecta
- Order: Lepidoptera
- Superfamily: Noctuoidea
- Family: Noctuidae
- Subfamily: Stiriinae
- Genus: Stilbia; Stephens, 1829

Genus of moths

Stilbia is a genus of moths of the family Noctuidae.

== Species ==
- Stilbia algirica Culot, 1914
- Stilbia andalusiaca Staudinger, 1892
- Stilbia anomala (Haworth, 1812)
- Stilbia bongiovanni Turati, 1924
- Stilbia calberlae (Failla-Tedaldi, 1890)
- Stilbia faillae Püngeler, 1918
- Stilbia nisseni Stertz, 1914
- Stilbia philopalis Graslin, 1852
- Stilbia powelli Boursin, 1940
- Stilbia syriaca Staudinger, 1892
- Stilbia turatii Lucas, 1910
