= Properigea perolivalis =

Scientific classification
- Domain: Eukaryota
- Kingdom: Animalia
- Phylum: Arthropoda
- Class: Insecta
- Order: Lepidoptera
- Superfamily: Noctuoidea
- Family: Noctuidae
- Genus: Properigea
- Species: P. perolivalis

Binomial name
- Properigea perolivalis (Barnes & McDunnough, 1912)

Species of moth

Properigea perolivalis is a species of cutworm or dart moth in the family Noctuidae. It was first described by William Barnes and James Halliday McDunnough in 1912 and it is found in North America.

The MONA or Hodges number for Properigea perolivalis is 9595.
