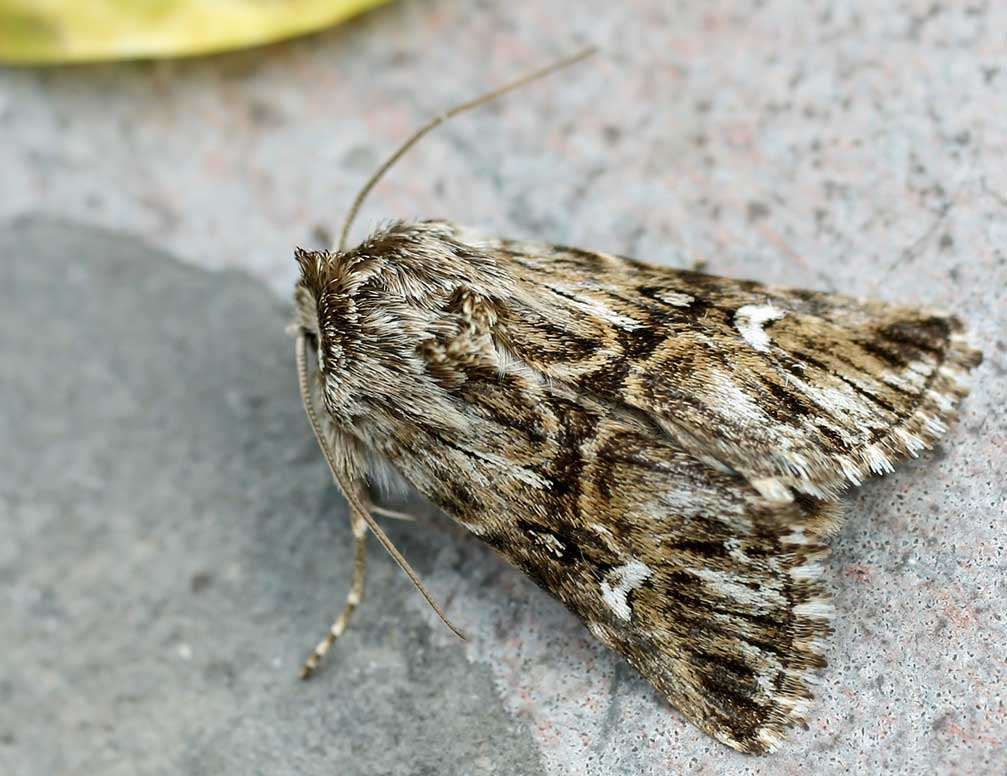

Scientific classification
- Kingdom: Animalia
- Phylum: Arthropoda
- Clade: Pancrustacea
- Class: Insecta
- Order: Lepidoptera
- Superfamily: Noctuoidea
- Family: Noctuidae
- Genus: Calophasia
- Species: C. lunula

Binomial name
- Calophasia lunula (Hufnagel, 1766)

= Calophasia lunula =

Species of moth

Calophasia lunula is a Palearctic species of noctuid moth known by the common names toadflax moth and toadflax brocade moth.

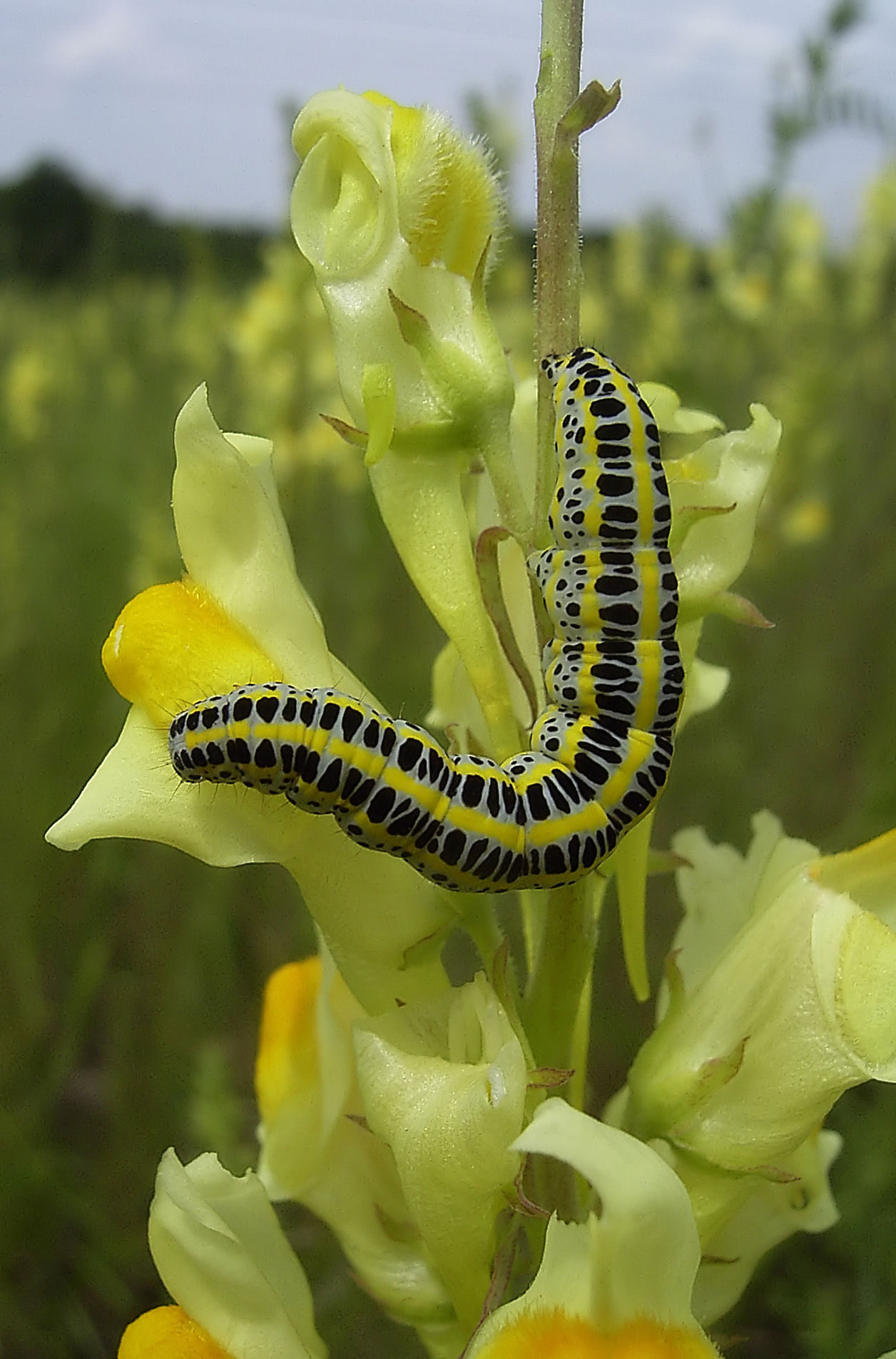
Caterpillar

== Technical description and variation ==
C. lunula Hufn. (= linariae Esp.) (29 b). Forewing bluish grey, suffused with olive fuscous, especially in median area and along an oblique fascia from apex to before anal angle; lines double, filled in with grey, but only distinct below middle, curved and approximating; claviform stigma elongate, bluish grey edged with black; orbicular small, flattened, white edged with black; reniform conspicuous, white with black lateral edges; some black streaks in the intervals across the oblique apical fascia; fringe chequered, olive brown and grey;hindwing dingy grey with the veins and braces of outer line darker; a smoky blackish broad terminal border. Larva bluish grey, with all the lines yellow; a dorsal series of transverse oblong velvety black blotches, and lateral series of black spots. 12 millimeters long.

== Distribution ==
Calophasia lunula extends throughout Europe including Central Europe and Southern Europe to Russia and Central Asia and the Russian Far East. It is missing in Japan. It is an introduced species in parts of Canada and the United States. In the Alps it is found at altitudes up to 2000 meters. The species prefers warm slopes, heathlands and wastelands.

== Biology ==
The female lays anywhere from 30 to 80 eggs on the leaves and flowers of toadflax plants. In one to two weeks the larva emerges from the egg and begins feeding. This caterpillar undergoes five molts during a one-month period. The first-stage larva is about 5 millimeters long and dark gray in color. The eyecatching older larvae are black and white spotted with bright yellow stripes. The mature larva is about 4 centimeters long. After this stage it pupates through the winter in a cocoon of chewed plant matter and leaf litter.

Damage to the plants is done by the voracious feeding of the caterpillars. They consume all the new leaf and flower buds first and then move on to eat stems, leaves, and flowers, often to the point of complete defoliation of large numbers of toadflax plants. This does not necessarily kill the plants but it severely reduces their ability to produce seeds and propagate. Adults feed harmlessly on the plants' nectar and do not contribute to the damage. It is used as an agent of biological pest control against yellow toadflax (Linaria vulgaris) and Dalmatian toadflax (Linaria genistifolia ssp. dalmatica) in areas where they are considered noxious weeds in North America. It was first introduced to Canada as a biocontrol agent in the early 1960s, and to the United States shortly thereafter. The moth is now established in many areas. It tends not to establish as easily in colder climates.
