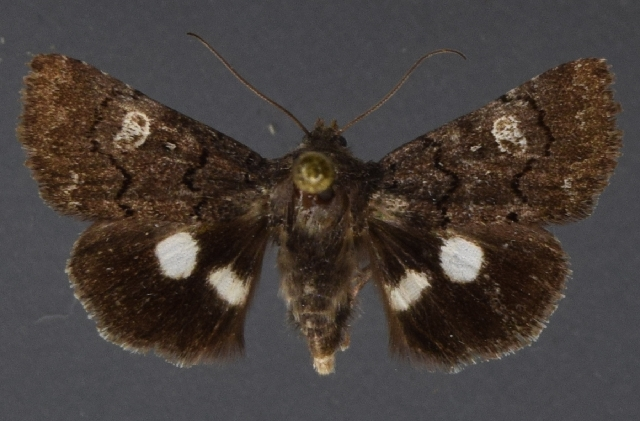

Scientific classification
- Domain: Eukaryota
- Kingdom: Animalia
- Phylum: Arthropoda
- Class: Insecta
- Order: Lepidoptera
- Superfamily: Noctuoidea
- Family: Noctuidae
- Genus: Copanarta
- Species: C. sexpunctata

Binomial name
- Copanarta sexpunctata Barnes & McDunnough, 1916

= Copanarta sexpunctata =

Species of moth

Copanarta sexpunctata is a species of moth in the family Noctuidae (the owlet moths). It was first described by William Barnes and James Halliday McDunnough in 1916 and it is found in North America.

The MONA or Hodges number for Copanarta sexpunctata is 10168.
