= Supralathosea pronuba =

Scientific classification
- Domain: Eukaryota
- Kingdom: Animalia
- Phylum: Arthropoda
- Class: Insecta
- Order: Lepidoptera
- Superfamily: Noctuoidea
- Family: Noctuidae
- Genus: Supralathosea
- Species: S. pronuba

Binomial name
- Supralathosea pronuba (Barnes & McDunnough, 1916)

Species of moth

Supralathosea pronuba is a species of mossy sallow in the family of moths known as Noctuidae. It was first described by William Barnes and James Halliday McDunnough in 1916 and it is found in North America.

The MONA or Hodges number for Supralathosea pronuba is 10035.
