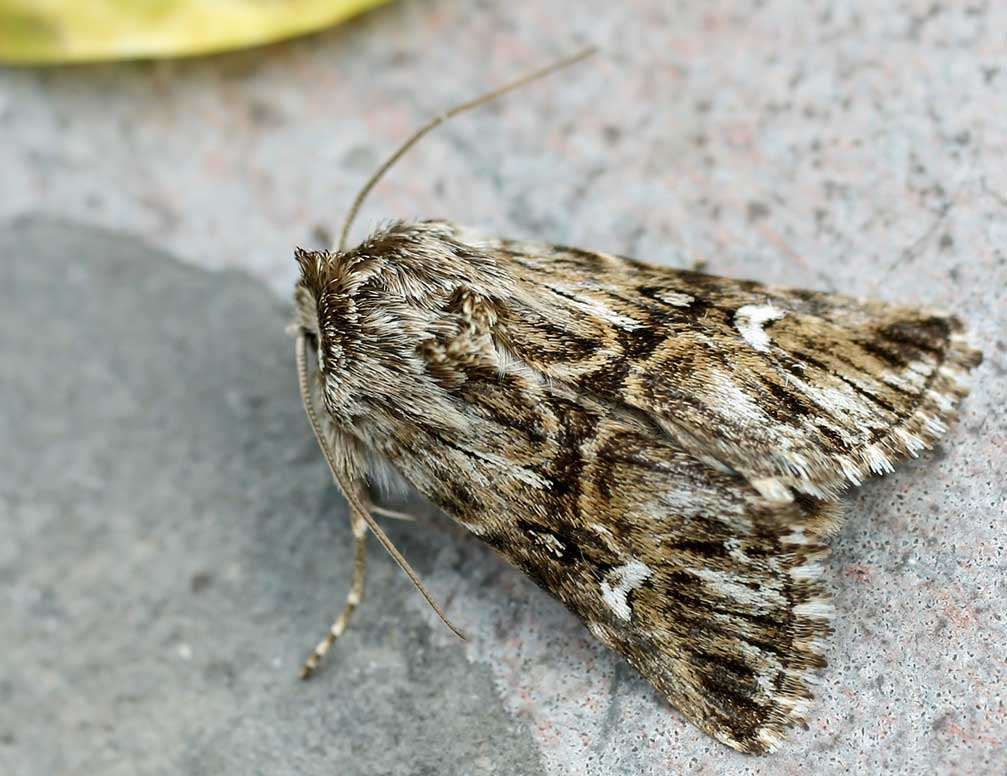
- Calophasia lunula

Scientific classification
- Kingdom: Animalia
- Phylum: Arthropoda
- Clade: Pancrustacea
- Class: Insecta
- Order: Lepidoptera
- Superfamily: Noctuoidea
- Family: Noctuidae
- Subfamily: Oncocnemidinae; Forbes and Franclemont, 1954

= Oncocnemidinae =

Subfamily of moths

Oncocnemidinae is a subfamily of moths which belong to the large moth family (Noctuidae). In contrast to most other members of the family, they fly during the day. Oncocnemidinae are small, dark coloured moths, but the backs of their wings are generally white with broad, black stripes.

== Systematic classification ==
- Subfamily Oncocnemidinae
  - Calophasia
    - Calophasia lunula (Hufnagel, 1766)
  - Sympistis Hübner, 1823
    - Sympistis funebris (Hübner, 1809)
    - Sympistis heliophila (Paykull, 1793)
    - Sympistis lapponica (Thunberg, 1791)
    - Sympistis nigrita (Boisduval, 1840)
  - Calliergis (Hübner, 1821)
    - Calliergis ramosa (Esper, 1786)
  - Stilbia (Stephens, 1829)
    - Stilbia anomala (Haworth, 1812)
