= Foster Hendrickson Benjamin =

American entomologist and lepidopterist

Foster Hendrickson Benjamin (17 September 1895 – 24 January 1936) was an American entomologist and lepidopterist.

== Biography ==
Benjamin was born in Brooklyn, New York. He was friends with George P. Engelhardt and Jacob Doll, who introduced him to entomology. In 1921 he graduated from Cornell University, and got a job from Mississippi State Plant Board. He became a curator of William Barnes Museum in 1922 at Decatur, Illinois, and by 1927 became a member of the United States Department of Agriculture and Bureau of Entomology. He was an assistant in investigations of the Mexican and Mediterranean fruit flies, that he found in Texas in 1927, and in Florida, 1929. He became a member of the Bureau of Entomology, a division of United States National Museum, where he remained until his death in 1936.

He died in Washington, D.C.
