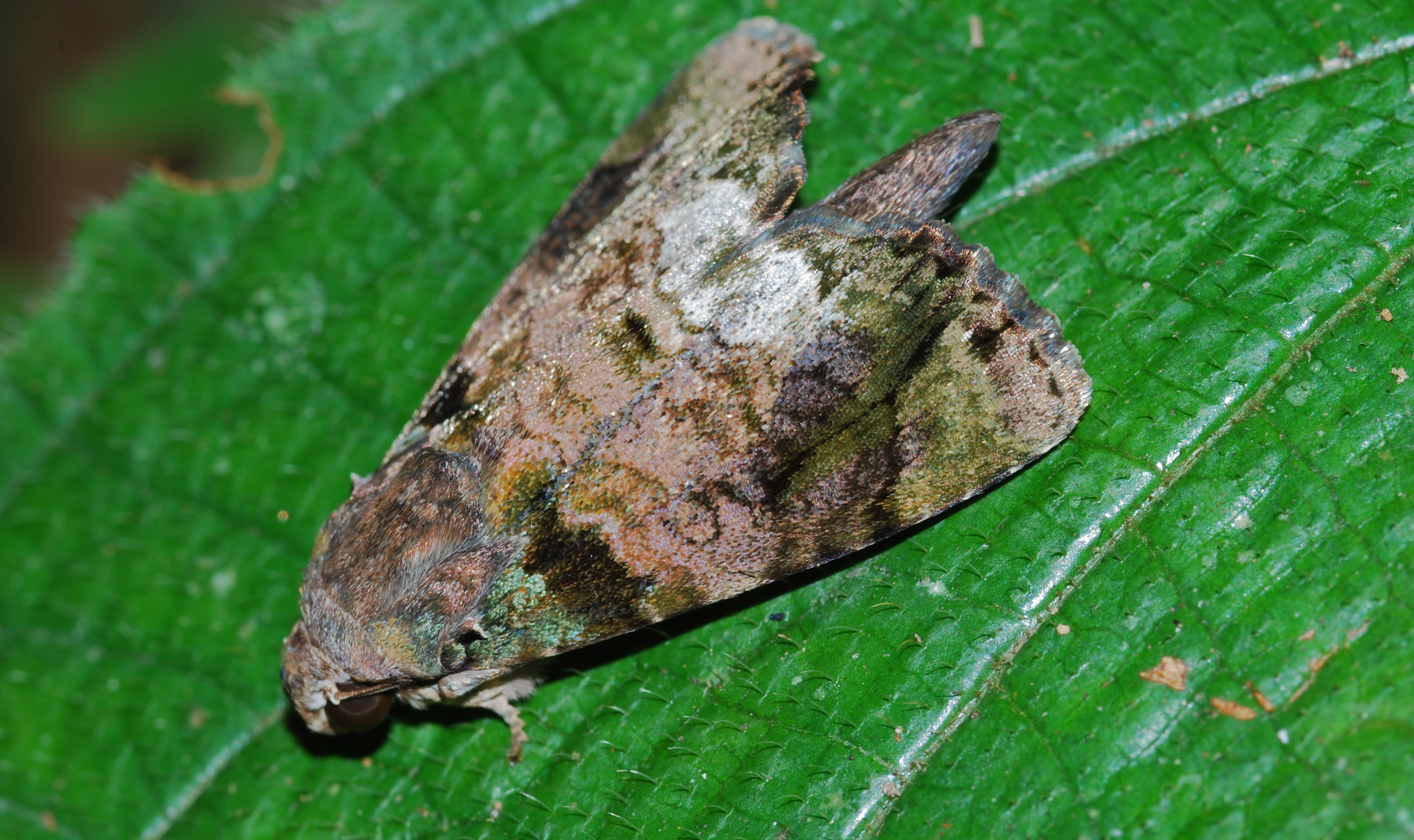
- C. nocturnus

Scientific classification
- Kingdom: Animalia
- Phylum: Arthropoda
- Class: Insecta
- Order: Lepidoptera
- Superfamily: Noctuoidea
- Family: Noctuidae
- Genus: Corythurus; Hampson, 1893

= Corythurus =

Genus of moths

Corythurus is a genus of moths of the family Noctuidae.

== Description ==
Sexes sexually dimorphic. In male, eyes naked and without lashes. Palpi slender, curved and extending backwards over vertex of head, where the third joint buried in very long hair from end of the second joint. Antennae almost simple. Thorax and abdomen smoothly scaled. Abdomen with immensely developed tubular anal tuft, and tibia spineless. Forewings with round apex, and cilia non-crenulate.

Female has far apart palpi and are naked, Third joint upturned and long. Abdomen lack anal tuft.

== Species ==
- Corythurus nocturnus Hampson, 1893
- Corythurus socia de Joannis, 1928
