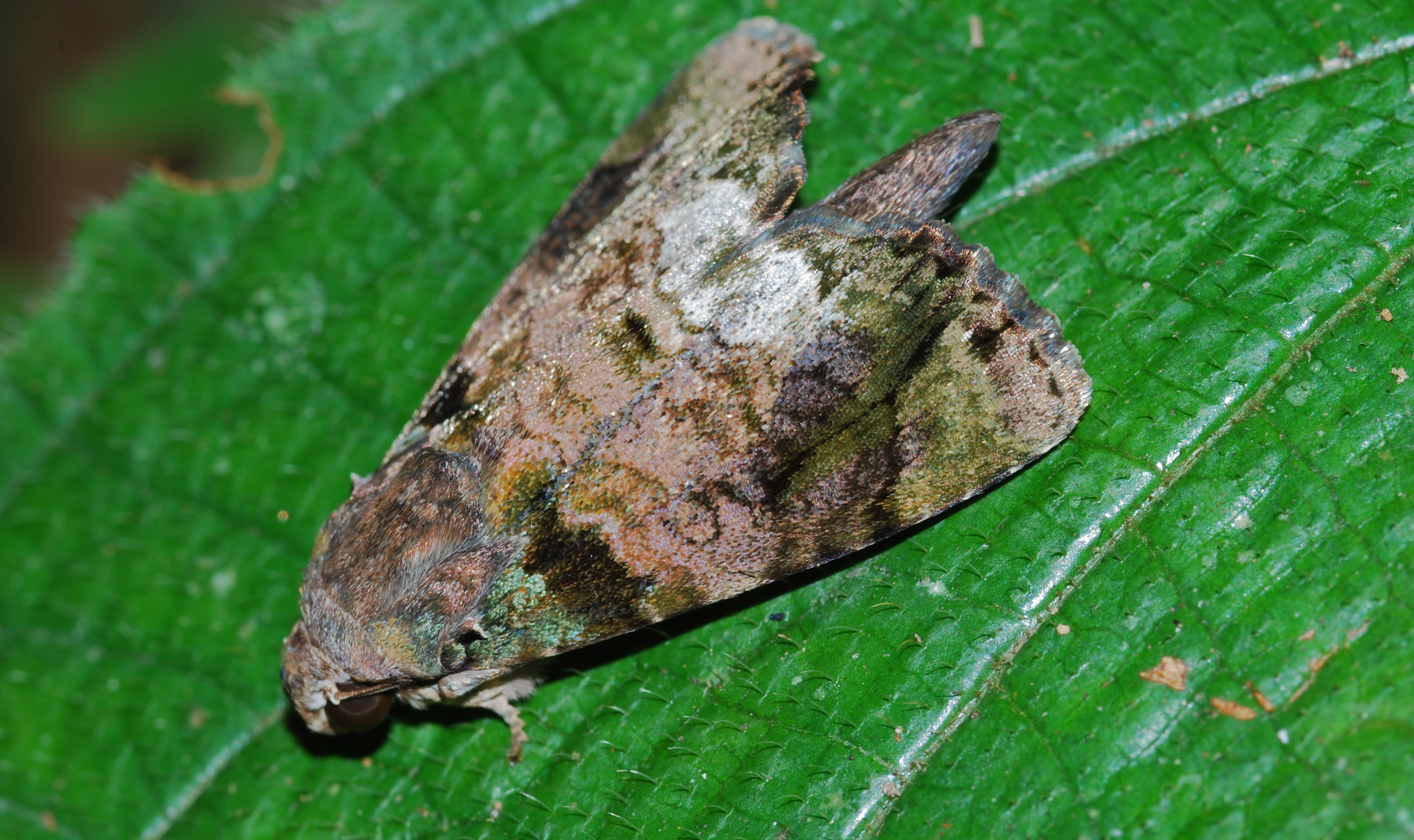

Scientific classification
- Kingdom: Animalia
- Phylum: Arthropoda
- Class: Insecta
- Order: Lepidoptera
- Superfamily: Noctuoidea
- Family: Noctuidae
- Genus: Corythurus
- Species: C. nocturnus

Binomial name
- Corythurus nocturnus Hampson, 1893

= Corythurus nocturnus =

Species of moth

Corythurus nocturnus is a moth of the family Noctuidae first described by George Hampson in 1893. It is found in Sri Lanka and Borneo.

Its wings are dark greyish. The forewings are dull bronze and black in various shades. Submarginal white markings on anterior half prominent in female, fade in male. Orbicular stigma is whitish.
