= List of noctuid genera: D =

The huge moth family Noctuidae contains the following genera:

A B C D E F G H I J K L M N O P Q R S T U V W X Y Z

- Dacira
- Dactyloplusia
- Daddala
- Dadica
- Daedalina
- Dagassa
- Dahlia
- Dallolmoia
- Dandaca
- Dantona
- Daona
- Dapha
- Daphoenura
- Darceta
- Darcetina
- Dargeochaeta
- Dargida
- Daseochaeta
- Daseuplexia
- Dasyblemma
- Dasycampa
- Dasyerges
- Dasygaster
- Dasymixis
- Dasypolia
- Dasyspoudaea
- Dasysternum
- Dasythorax
- Data
- Datungia
- Daubeplusia
- Daula
- Davea
- Debrosania
- Decarynodes
- Decelea
- Deceptria
- Decticryptis
- Dectocraspedon
- Deinhugia
- Deinopa
- Deinopalpus
- Deinypena
- Delgamma
- Delocoma
- Deltote
- Dentilymnia
- Deobriga
- Depalpata
- Deremma
- Dermaleipa
- Derrima
- Desana
- Desertoplusia
- Desertullia
- Desmophora
- Despumosia
- Deva
- Devena
- Dexiadena
- Diachrysia
- Diadochia
- Diadocis
- Diagrapta
- Dialithis
- Diallagma
- Dialoxa
- Dialta
- Diamuna
- Dianobia
- Dianthivora
- Diapera
- Diaphone
- Diapolia
- Diarsia
- Diascia
- Diascoides
- Diastema
- Diastreptoneura
- Diasyngrapha
- Diataraxia
- Diatenes
- Dicerogastra
- Dichagramma
- Dichagyris
- Dichonia
- Dichoniopsis
- Dichonioxa
- Dichromia
- Dicopis
- Dictyestra
- Dicycla
- Dida
- Dierna
- Diethusa
- Diloba
- Dimorphicosmia
- Dimorphinoctua
- Dinoprora
- Dinumma
- Diodines
- Diomea
- Diopa
- Dioszeghyana
- Diparopsis
- Dipaustica
- Diphteramoma
- Diphthera
- Diphtherocome
- Dipinacia
- Diplodira
- Diplonephra
- Diplothecta
- Dipterygina
- Diptheroides
- Discestra
- Dischalis
- Discosema
- Dissimactebia
- Dissolophus
- Disticta
- Ditrogoptera
- Divaena
- Divercala
- Dnopheropis
- Docela
- Dochmiogramma
- Doerriesa
- Dogninades
- Dolichosomastis
- Dolocucullia
- Donacesa
- Donda
- Donuca
- Donuctenusa
- Dordura
- Dorika
- Dorsippa
- Dorstiana
- Doryodes
- Dosa
- Douzdrina
- Dragana
- Draganodes
- Drasteria
- Drasteriodes
- Draudtia
- Draudtiana
- Drepanoblemma
- Drepanofoda
- Drepanopalpia
- Drepanoperas
- Drepanophiletis
- Drepanopses
- Drepanorhina
- Drobeta
- Drucuma
- Dryobota
- Dryobotodes
- Dryotype
- Dubiphane
- Dugaria
- Duhemia
- Dunira
- Duriga
- Dusponera
- Dymba
- Dyomyx
- Dyops
- Dypterygia
- Dyrzela
- Dysaletia
- Dysedia
- Dysglyptogona
- Dysgnathia
- Dysgonia
- Dysgraphhadena
- Dysmilichia
- Dysocnemis
- Dyspyralis
- Dysthymia
