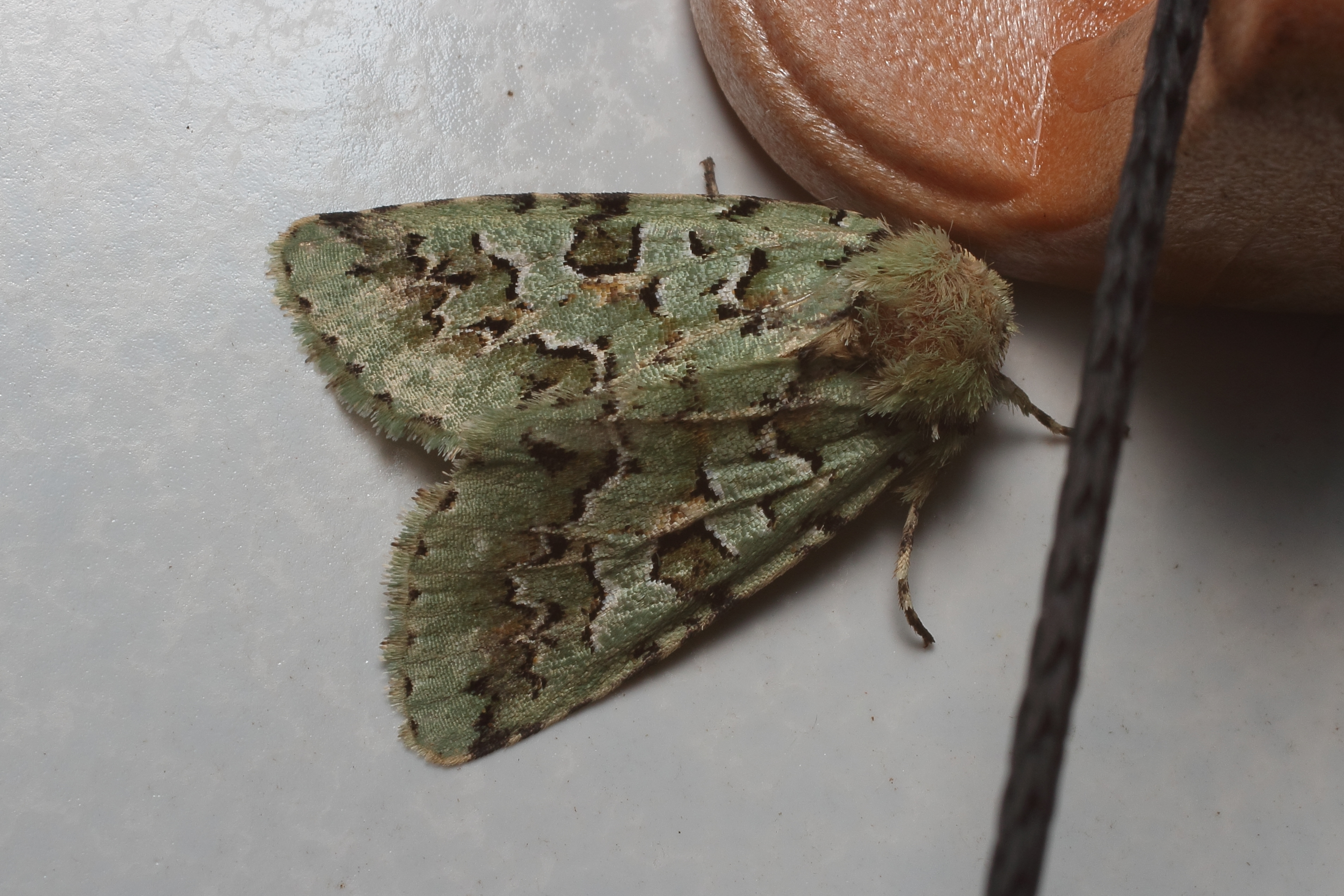
- Daseochaeta viridis

Scientific classification
- Domain: Eukaryota
- Kingdom: Animalia
- Phylum: Arthropoda
- Class: Insecta
- Order: Lepidoptera
- Superfamily: Noctuoidea
- Family: Noctuidae
- Genus: Daseochaeta; Warren, 1907

Type species
- Agrioopis viridis Leech, 1889

= Daseochaeta =

Genus of moths

Daseochaeta is a genus of moths of the family Noctuidae. The genus was described by Warren in 1907.

The majority of species of this genus are currently under the valid genus Diphtherocome.

Some species of this genus are:

- Daseochaeta mckeanae Cockerell, 1930 (from Thailand)
- Daseochaeta verbenata Distant 1898
- Daseochaeta viridis (Leech, 1889) (from Japan)

Former species of this genus:

- Daseochaeta autumnalis Chang, 1991 (from Taiwan)
- Daseochaeta brevipennis (from Tibet)
- Daseochaeta metaphaea Hampson 1909 (from western China)
- Daseochaeta pulchra Wileman, 1912 (from Taiwan)
