= Psaphida thaxteriana =

Scientific classification
- Kingdom: Animalia
- Phylum: Arthropoda
- Class: Insecta
- Order: Lepidoptera
- Superfamily: Noctuoidea
- Family: Noctuidae
- Genus: Psaphida
- Species: P. thaxteriana

Binomial name
- Psaphida thaxteriana Grote, 1874

Synonyms
- Psaphida thaxterianus (Grote, 1874)

Species of moth

Psaphida thaxteriana is a moth of the family Noctuidae first described by Augustus Radcliffe Grote in 1874. It is found in the eastern parts of North America, including Tennessee and Maryland.

The larvae feed on Quercus species.
