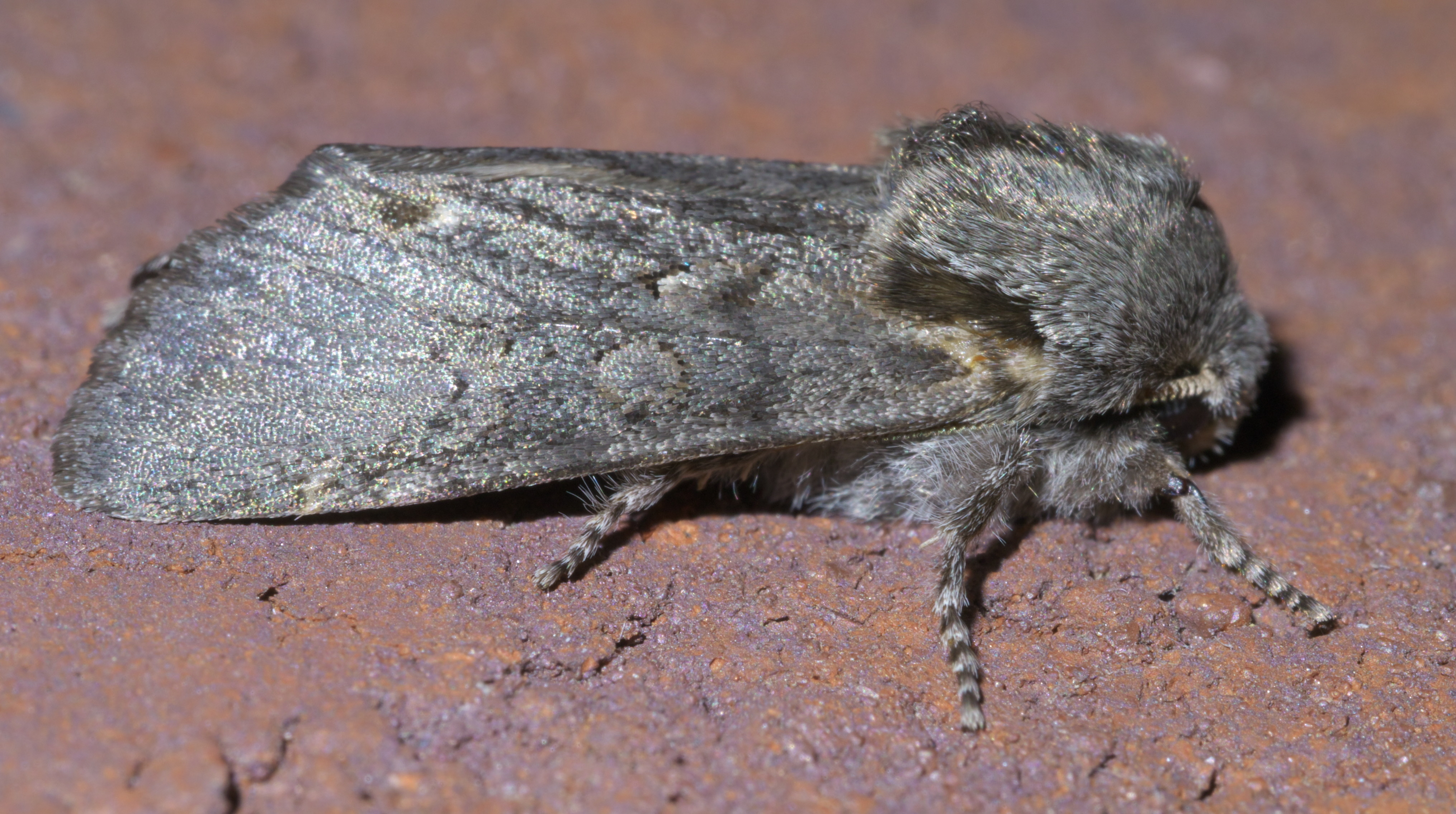

Scientific classification
- Domain: Eukaryota
- Kingdom: Animalia
- Phylum: Arthropoda
- Class: Insecta
- Order: Lepidoptera
- Superfamily: Noctuoidea
- Family: Noctuidae
- Genus: Psaphida
- Species: P. electilis

Binomial name
- Psaphida electilis (Morrison, 1875)

Synonyms
- Eutolype electilis (Morrison, 1875); Dicopis electilis Morrison, 1875; Eutolype depilis Grote, 1881; Eutolype bombyciformis J. B. Smith, 1892

= Psaphida electilis =

Species of moth

Psaphida electilis, the chosen sallow, is a species of moth of the family Noctuidae. The species was first described by Herbert Knowles Morrison in 1875. It is found in North America from Quebec and Ontario to Florida, west to Texas and Wisconsin.

The wingspan is about 35 mm. Adults are on wing from April to May. There is one generation per year.

The larvae feed on Carya and Juglans species.
