= Isogona punctipennis =

Scientific classification
- Kingdom: Animalia
- Phylum: Arthropoda
- Class: Insecta
- Order: Lepidoptera
- Superfamily: Noctuoidea
- Family: Erebidae
- Genus: Isogona
- Species: I. punctipennis

Binomial name
- Isogona punctipennis (Grote, 1883)

Synonyms
- Spargaloma punctipennis (Grote, 1883); Isogona acuna Barnes, 1907

Species of moth

Isogona punctipennis is a species of moth of the family Erebidae. It is found in Arizona.

The wingspan is 23–26 mm.
