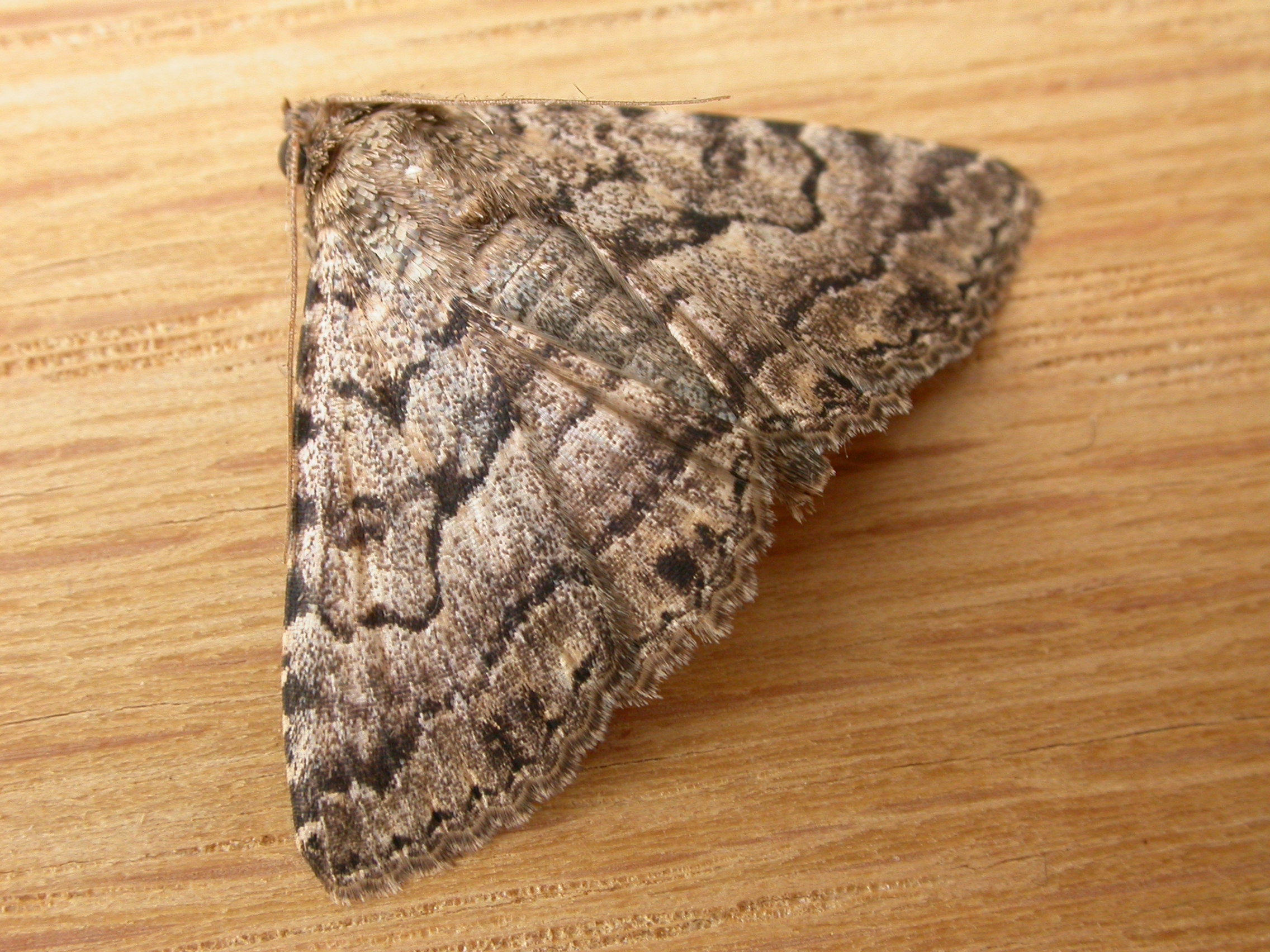

Scientific classification
- Kingdom: Animalia
- Phylum: Arthropoda
- Class: Insecta
- Order: Lepidoptera
- Superfamily: Noctuoidea
- Family: Erebidae
- Genus: Diatenes
- Species: D. aglossoides

Binomial name
- Diatenes aglossoides Guenée, 1852

Synonyms
- Setida quadrisignata

= Diatenes aglossoides =

Species of moth

Diatenes aglossoides is a moth of the family Erebidae first described by Achille Guenée in 1852. It is found in most of Australia.

The wingspan is about 40 mm.

The larvae feed on Acacia species.

== Gallery ==
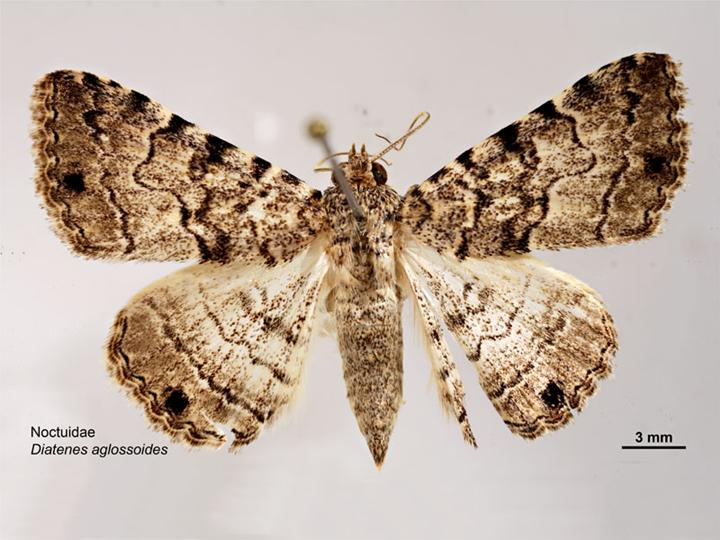
Dorsal view

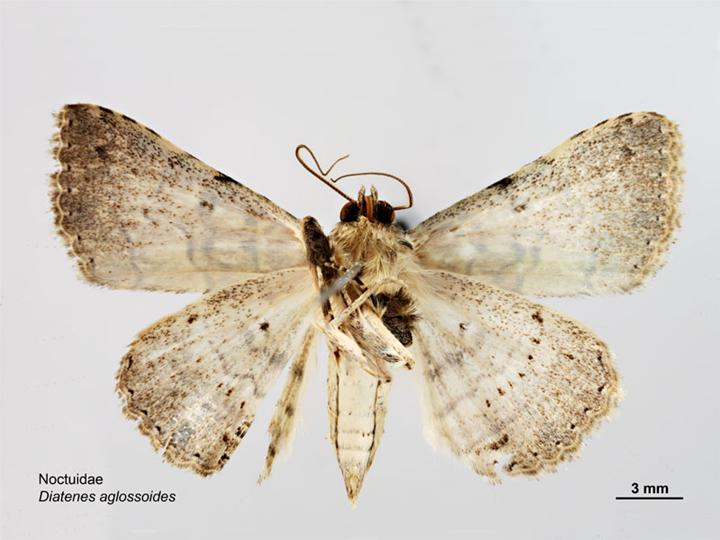
Ventral view
