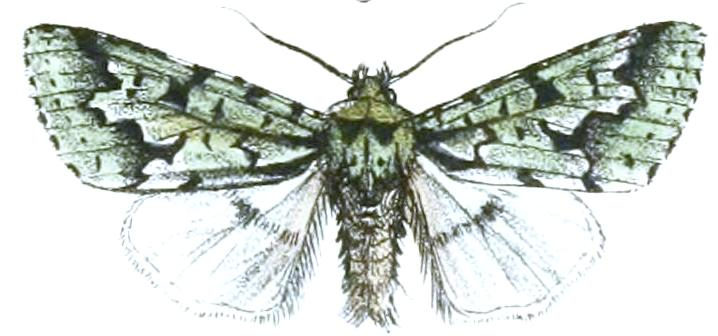

Scientific classification
- Domain: Eukaryota
- Kingdom: Animalia
- Phylum: Arthropoda
- Class: Insecta
- Order: Lepidoptera
- Superfamily: Noctuoidea
- Family: Noctuidae
- Genus: Diphtherocome
- Species: D. pallida

Binomial name
- Diphtherocome pallida (Moore, 1867)

Synonyms
- Diphthera pallida Moore, 1867; Diphtherocome laevis Warren, 1909; Diphtherocome minor Warren, 1909

= Diphtherocome pallida =

Species of moth

Diphtherocome pallida is a species of moth of the family Noctuidae. It is found in India.
