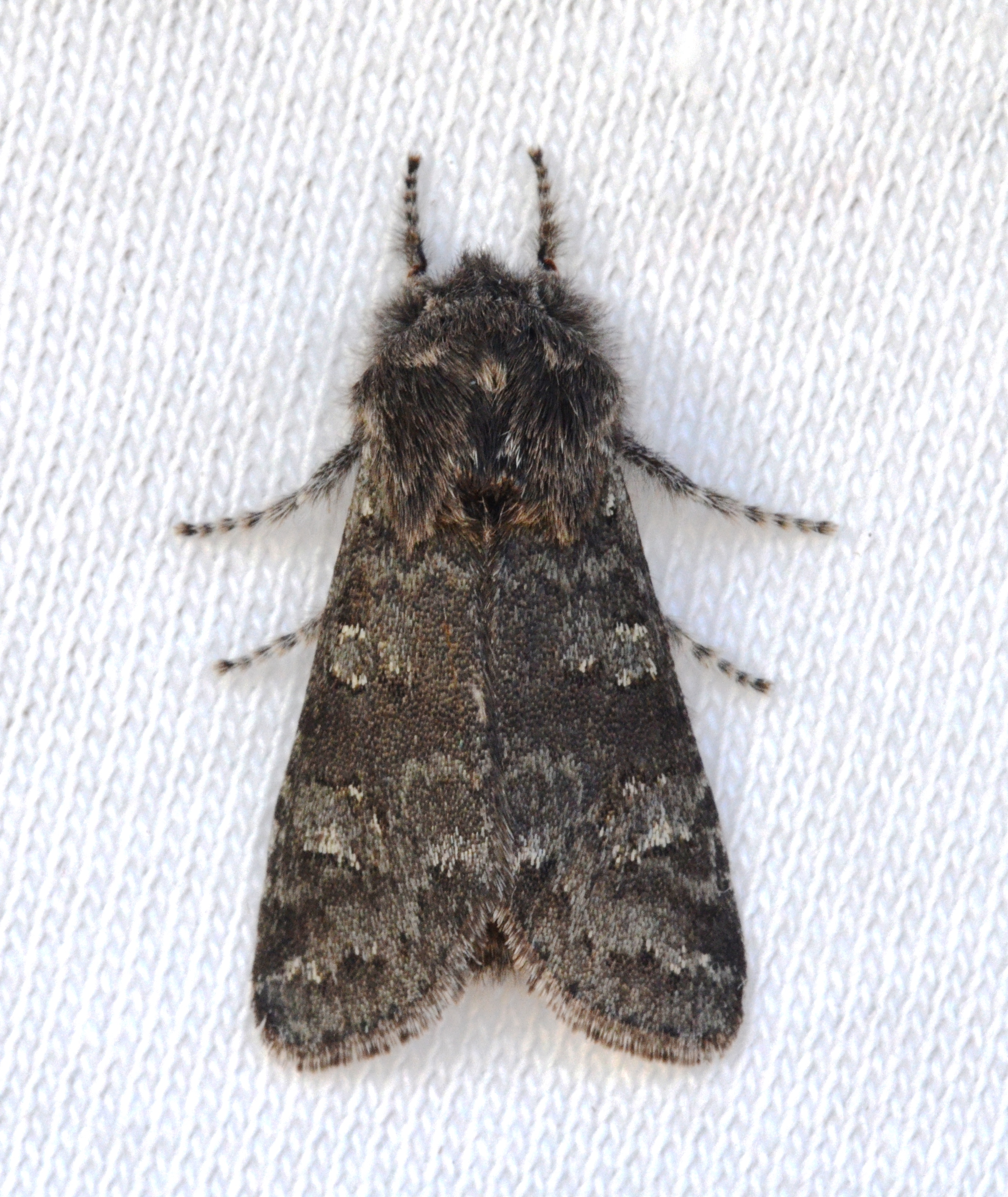

Scientific classification
- Domain: Eukaryota
- Kingdom: Animalia
- Phylum: Arthropoda
- Class: Insecta
- Order: Lepidoptera
- Superfamily: Noctuoidea
- Family: Noctuidae
- Genus: Psaphida
- Species: P. rolandi

Binomial name
- Psaphida rolandi (Grote, 1874)

Synonyms
- Eutolype rolandi Grote, 1874

= Psaphida rolandi =

Species of moth

Psaphida rolandi, or Roland's sallow, is a moth of the family Noctuidae. The species was first described by Augustus Radcliffe Grote in 1874. It is found in North America from southern Ontario and Quebec, south to Florida.

The wingspan is about 34 mm. Adults are on wing from April to May.

The larvae feed on oak.
