= Dunira scitula =

Scientific classification
- Kingdom: Animalia
- Phylum: Arthropoda
- Clade: Pancrustacea
- Class: Insecta
- Order: Lepidoptera
- Superfamily: Noctuoidea
- Family: Erebidae
- Genus: Dunira
- Species: D. scitula

Binomial name
- Dunira scitula Walker, 1865

Species of moth

Dunira scitula is a moth of the family Noctuidae first described by Francis Walker in 1865. It is found in Sri Lanka.
