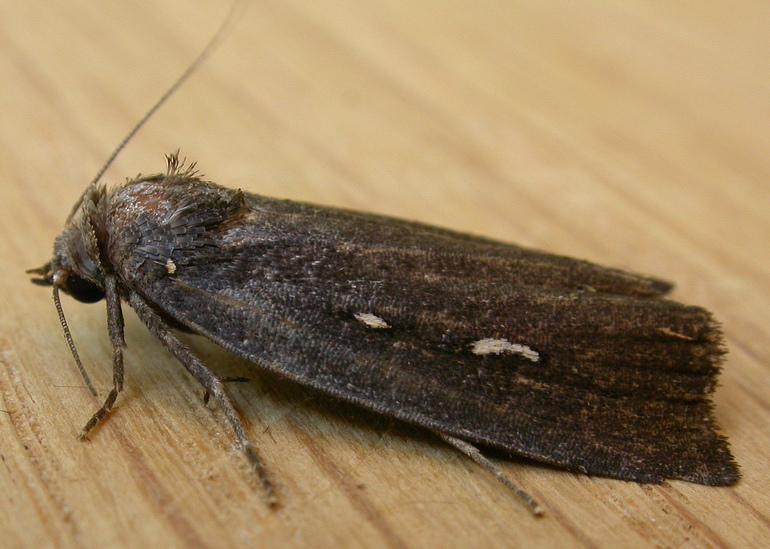

Scientific classification
- Kingdom: Animalia
- Phylum: Arthropoda
- Class: Insecta
- Order: Lepidoptera
- Superfamily: Noctuoidea
- Family: Erebidae
- Genus: Egone
- Species: E. atrisquamata

Binomial name
- Egone atrisquamata Hampson, 1926

Synonyms
- Capelica oxylopha Turner, 1944

= Egone atrisquamata =

Species of moth

Egone atrisquamata is a moth of the family Erebidae first described by George Hampson in 1926. It is found in Australia.
