= Isogona natatrix =

Scientific classification
- Kingdom: Animalia
- Phylum: Arthropoda
- Class: Insecta
- Order: Lepidoptera
- Superfamily: Noctuoidea
- Family: Erebidae
- Genus: Isogona
- Species: I. natatrix

Binomial name
- Isogona natatrix Guenée, 1852

Species of moth

Isogona natatrix is a species of moth of the family Erebidae. It is found in North America, including Texas.
