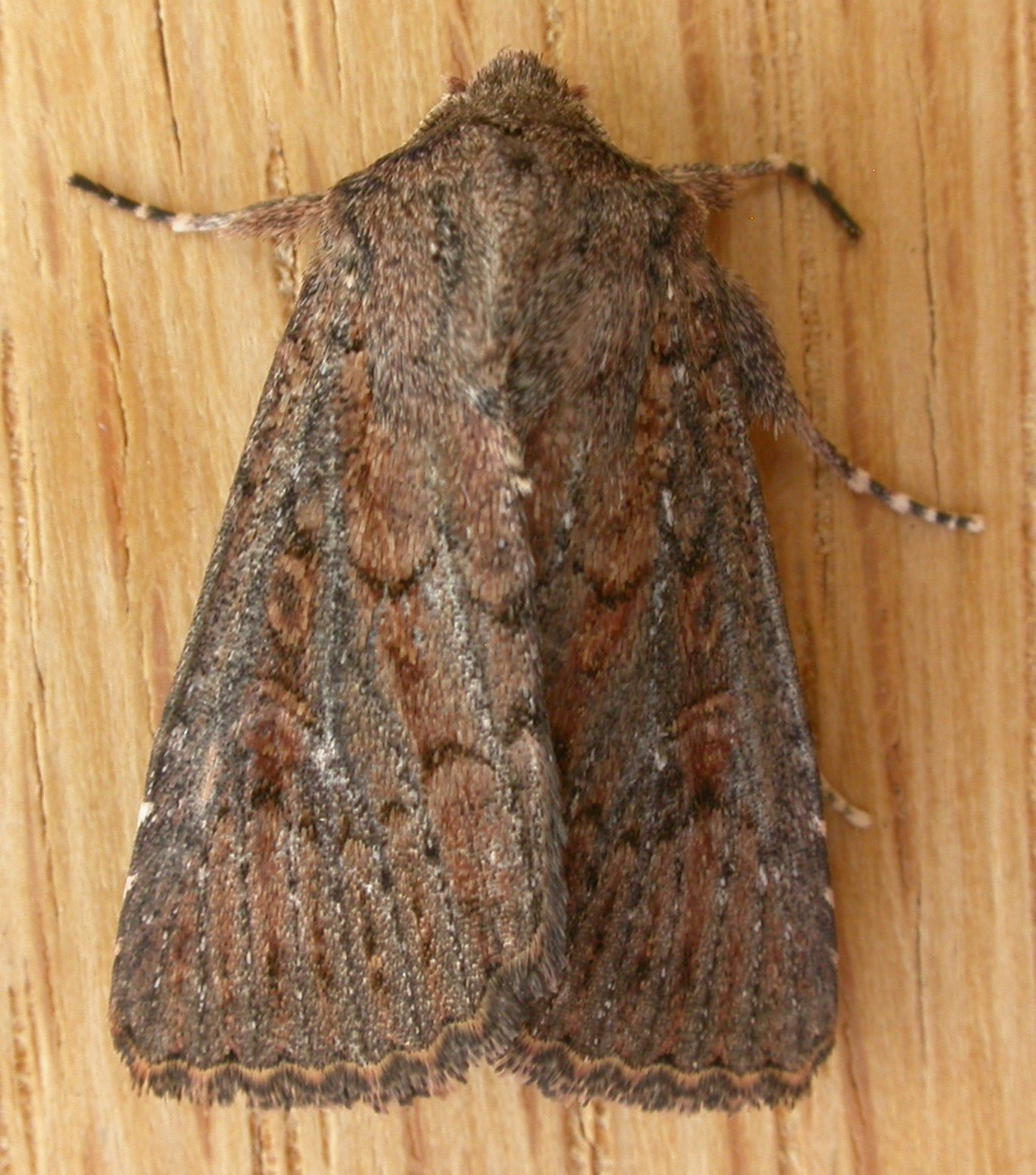

Scientific classification
- Domain: Eukaryota
- Kingdom: Animalia
- Phylum: Arthropoda
- Class: Insecta
- Order: Lepidoptera
- Superfamily: Noctuoidea
- Family: Noctuidae
- Genus: Dasygaster
- Species: D. padockina

Binomial name
- Dasygaster padockina (Le Guillou, 1841)

Synonyms
- Noctua padockina Le Guillou, 1841; Dasygaster hollandiae Guenée, 1852; Dasygaster leucanioides Guenée, 1852; Graphiphora facilis Walker, 1857; Mamestra confundens Walker, 1869; Dasygaster hollandiae suffusa Warren, 1912; Perigea brunneotincta Strand, 1916

= Dasygaster padockina =

Tasmanian cutworm

Species of moth

Dasygaster padockina, the Tasmanian cutworm, is a moth of the family Noctuidae. It is found in Australia.

The larvae feed on various grasses.
