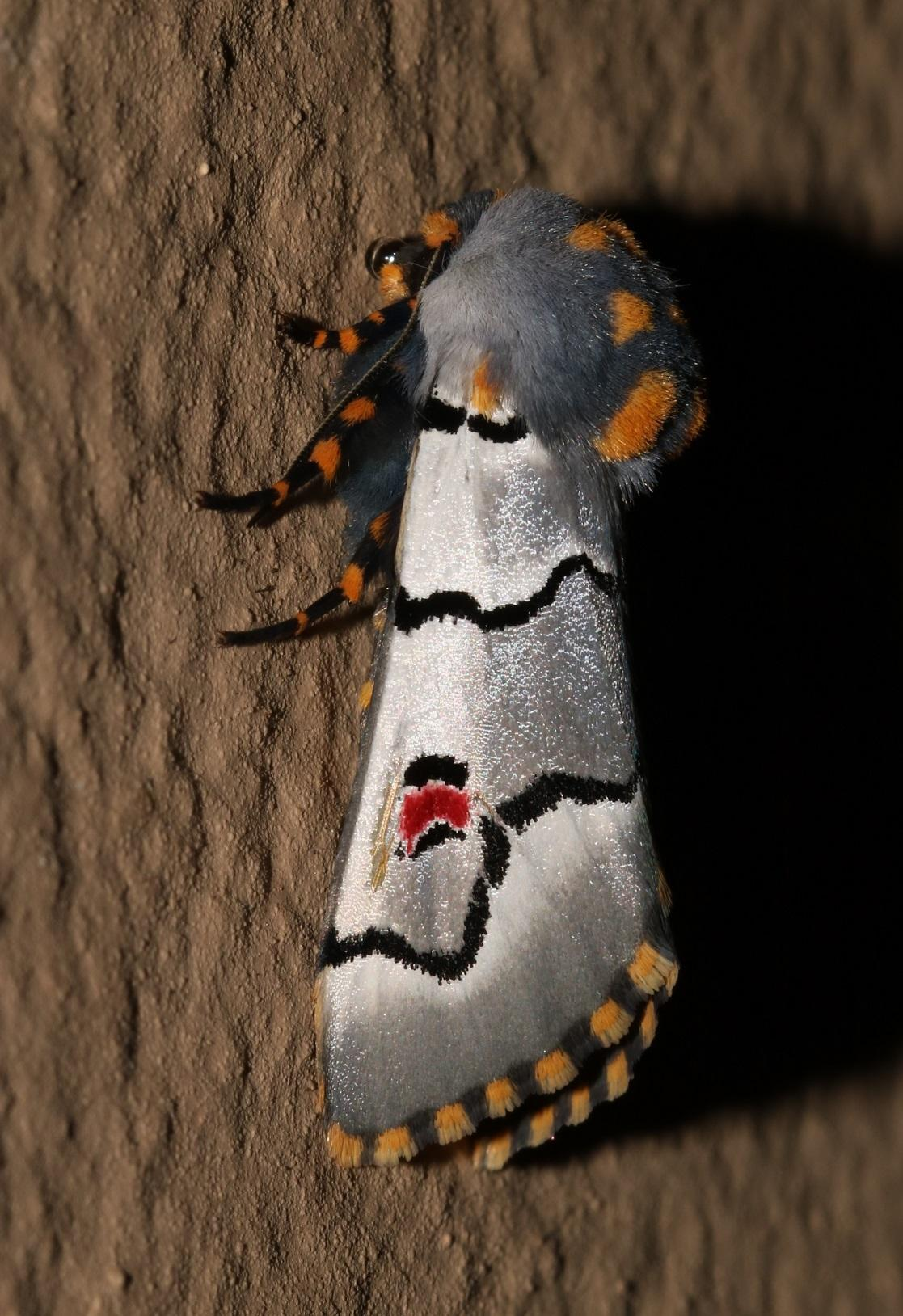
- Adult
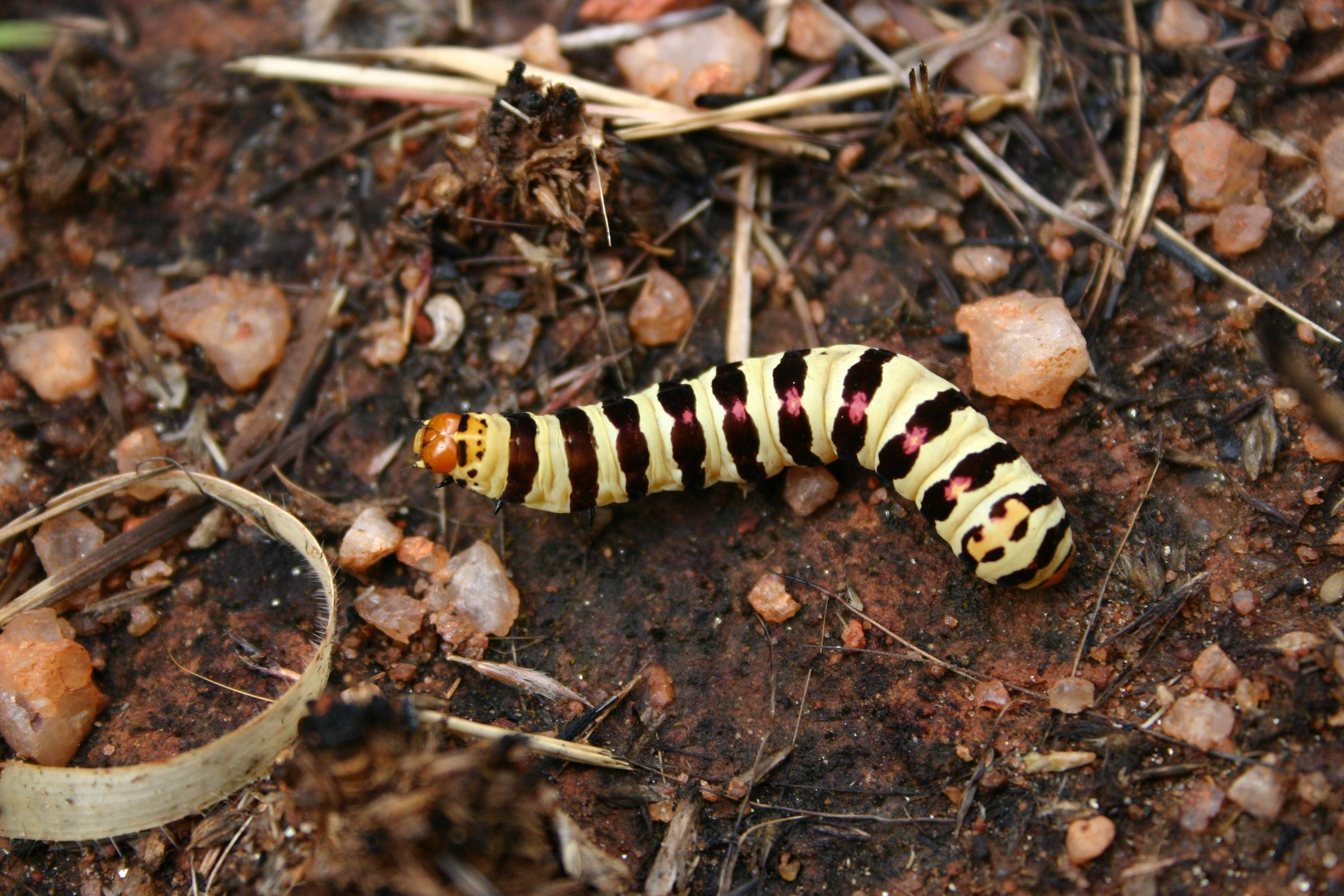
- Larva

Scientific classification
- Kingdom: Animalia
- Phylum: Arthropoda
- Clade: Pancrustacea
- Class: Insecta
- Order: Lepidoptera
- Superfamily: Noctuoidea
- Family: Noctuidae
- Genus: Diaphone
- Species: D. eumela

Binomial name
- Diaphone eumela (Stoll, [1782])

Synonyms
- Phalaena eumela Stoll, [1782]; Phalaena Noctua eumela Stoll, [1782]; Bombyx elegans Fabricius, 1787; Phalaena Noctua sylviana Stoll, [1790]; Chelonia evidens Guérin-Méneville, [1832]; Diaphone sylviana var. mossambicensis Hopffer, 1862; Diaphone angolensis Weymer, 1901; Diaphone libertina Bartel, 1903; Diaphone barnsi Prout, 1921; Ovios sylvina Walker, 1855

= Diaphone eumela =

Species of moth

Diaphone eumela, the cherry spot or lily borer, is a moth of the family Noctuidae. It is found in Lesotho, Mozambique, Namibia, South Africa ,Kenya and Angola.

Like its relative, Brithys crini, this noctuid is found almost exclusively on plants of the families Amaryllidaceae and Liliaceae, and has been recorded feeding on Ornithogalum eckloni and Boophone disticha.
