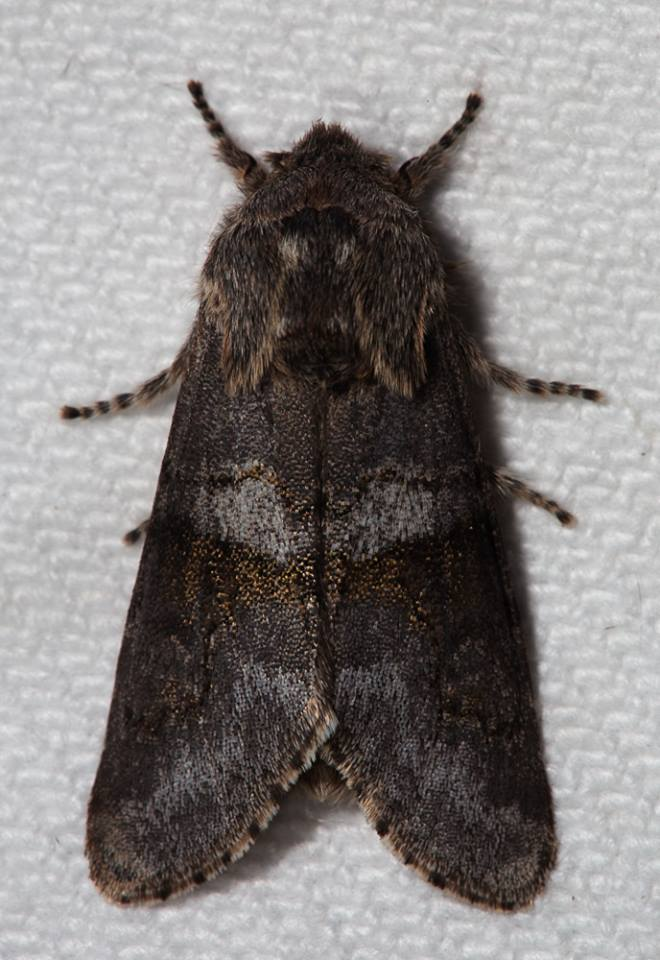

Scientific classification
- Kingdom: Animalia
- Phylum: Arthropoda
- Clade: Pancrustacea
- Class: Insecta
- Order: Lepidoptera
- Superfamily: Noctuoidea
- Family: Noctuidae
- Genus: Psaphida
- Species: P. grandis

Binomial name
- Psaphida grandis (J. B. Smith, 1898)

Synonyms
- Eutolype grandis J. B. Smith, 1898

= Psaphida grandis =

Species of moth

Psaphida grandis, the gray sallow, is a moth of the family Noctuidae. The species was first described by John Bernhardt Smith in 1898. It is found in North America from Ontario, south to Florida. It has been recorded from Iowa, New York, Maryland, South Carolina, Arkansas, Michigan and Wisconsin.

The wingspan is about 38 mm.

== See also ==
- Noctuidae
- Psaphida
- List of moths of North America
- List of moths of the United States
