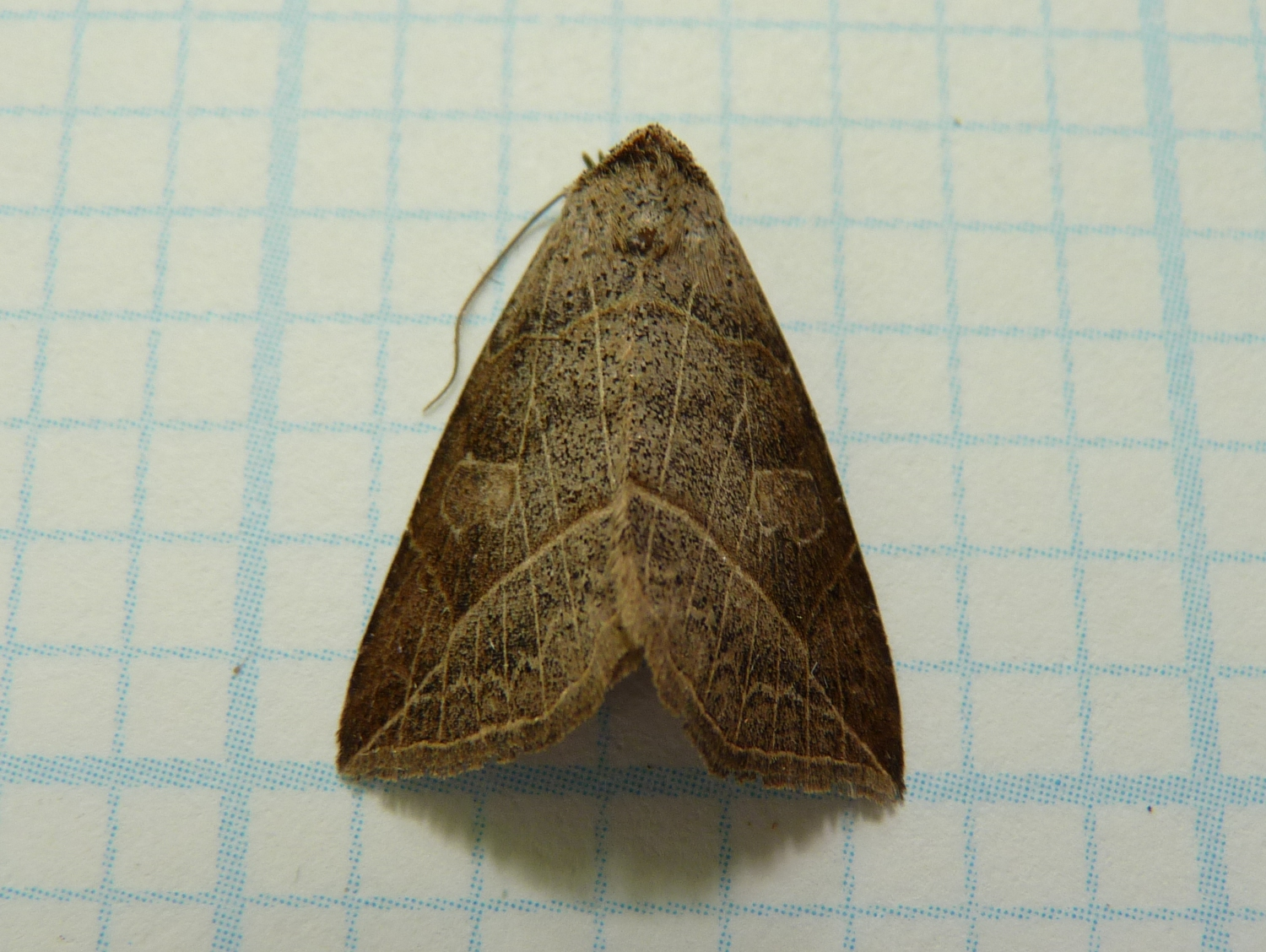

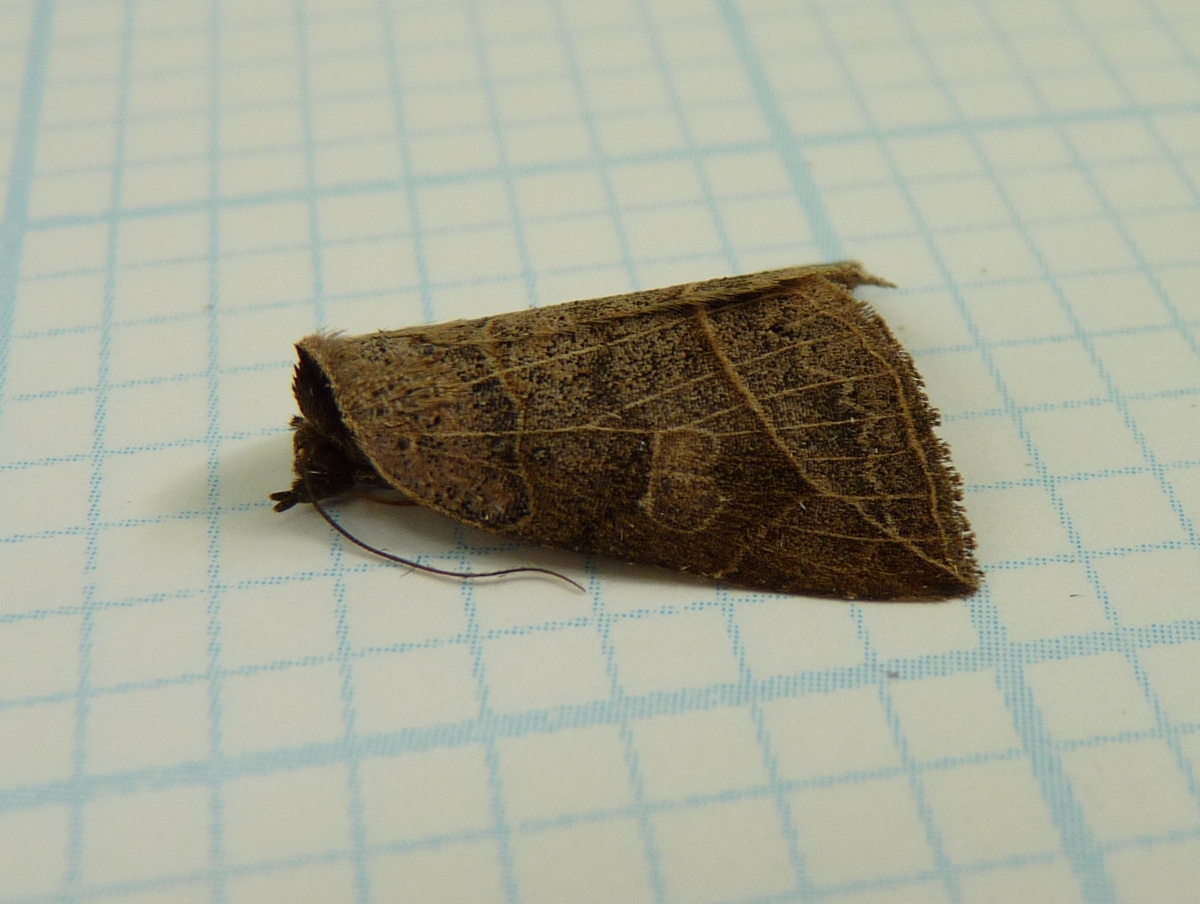

Scientific classification
- Kingdom: Animalia
- Phylum: Arthropoda
- Clade: Pancrustacea
- Class: Insecta
- Order: Lepidoptera
- Superfamily: Noctuoidea
- Family: Erebidae
- Genus: Isogona
- Species: I. tenuis

Binomial name
- Isogona tenuis (Grote, 1872)

= Isogona tenuis =

Species of moth

Isogona tenuis, the thin-lined owlet, is a moth of the family Erebidae. The species was first described by Augustus Radcliffe Grote in 1872. It is found from Ontario, Wisconsin, Ohio and New Jersey, south to Florida and Texas.

The wingspan is 28–30 millimetres (1.1–1.2 in). Adults are on wing from May to August in the north and from April to October in the south.

The larvae feed on Celtis species.
