= Dolocucullia dentilinea =

Scientific classification
- Domain: Eukaryota
- Kingdom: Animalia
- Phylum: Arthropoda
- Class: Insecta
- Order: Lepidoptera
- Superfamily: Noctuoidea
- Family: Noctuidae
- Genus: Dolocucullia
- Species: D. dentilinea

Binomial name
- Dolocucullia dentilinea (Smith, 1899)

Species of moth

Dolocucullia dentilinea is a species of moth in the family Noctuidae (the owlet moths).

The MONA or Hodges number for Dolocucullia dentilinea is 10188.
