= Diastreptoneura =

Scientific classification
- Domain: Eukaryota
- Kingdom: Animalia
- Phylum: Arthropoda
- Class: Insecta
- Order: Lepidoptera
- Superfamily: Noctuoidea
- Family: Noctuidae
- Subfamily: Acontiinae
- Genus: Diastreptoneura; Warren, 1889
- Species: D. distorta

Binomial name
- Diastreptoneura distorta Warren, 1889

Genus of moths

Diastreptoneura is a monotypic moth genus of the family Noctuidae. Its only species, Diastreptoneura distorta, is found in the Brazilian state of Amazonas. Both the genus and species were first described by Warren in 1889.

The Global Lepidoptera Names Index gives this name as a synonym of Drobeta Walker, 1858.
