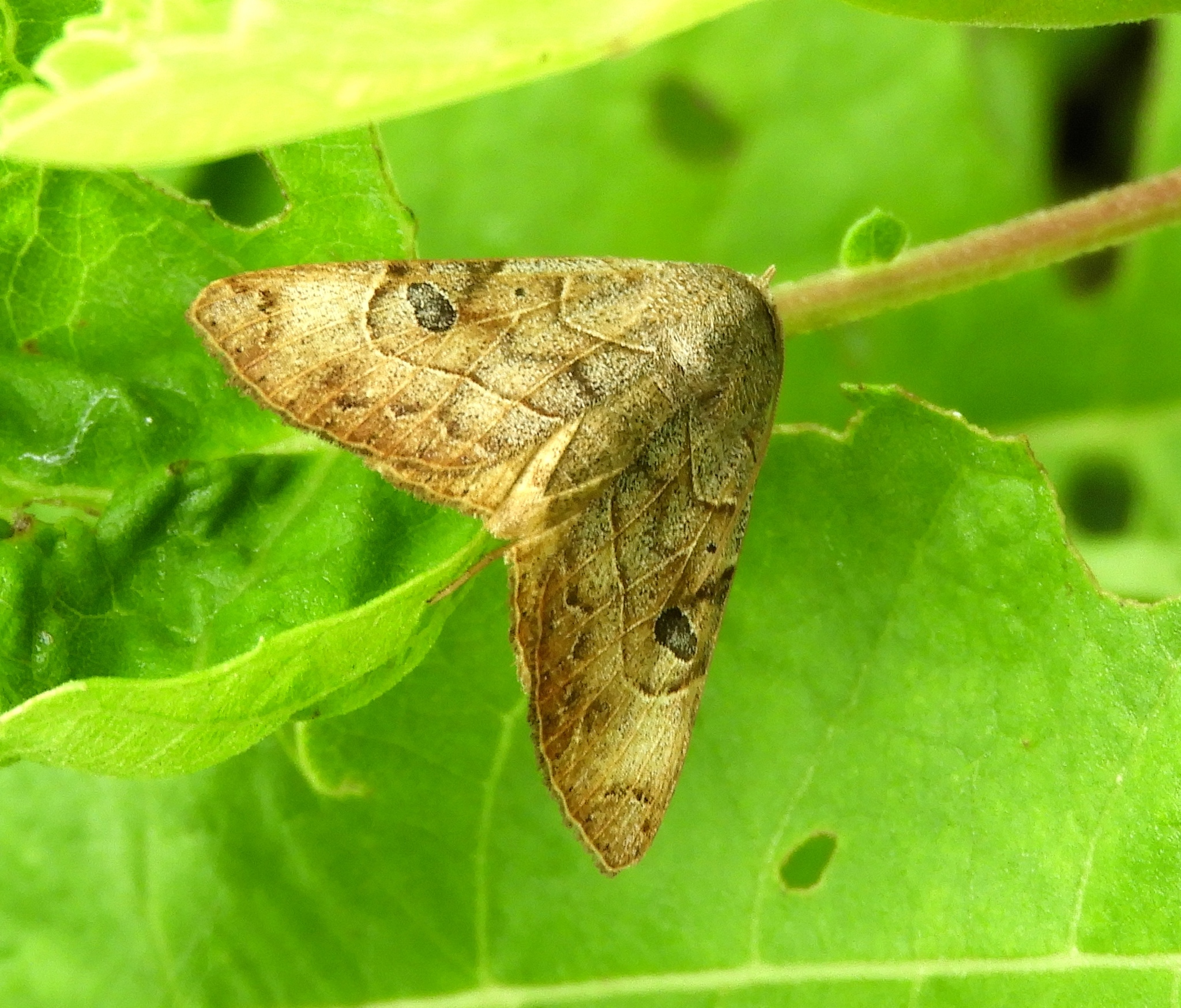

Scientific classification
- Kingdom: Animalia
- Phylum: Arthropoda
- Class: Insecta
- Order: Lepidoptera
- Superfamily: Noctuoidea
- Family: Erebidae
- Genus: Isogona
- Species: I. scindens

Binomial name
- Isogona scindens (Walker, 1858)

Synonyms
- Isogona ordinans (Walker, 1858); Poaphila ordinans Walker, 1858

= Isogona scindens =

Species of moth

Isogona scindens is a species of moth of the family Erebidae first described by Francis Walker in 1858. It is found from the southern parts of the United States to Paraguay and on Saint Kitts, Antigua, Grenada, Jamaica, Cuba, Hispaniola and Saint Croix.
