= Isogona segura =

Scientific classification
- Domain: Eukaryota
- Kingdom: Animalia
- Phylum: Arthropoda
- Class: Insecta
- Order: Lepidoptera
- Superfamily: Noctuoidea
- Family: Erebidae
- Genus: Isogona
- Species: I. segura

Binomial name
- Isogona segura Barnes, 1907

Species of moth

Isogona segura is a species of moth of the family Erebidae first described by William Barnes in 1907. It is found in the US state of Arizona.

The wingspan is 25–29 millimetres (0.98–1.14 in).
