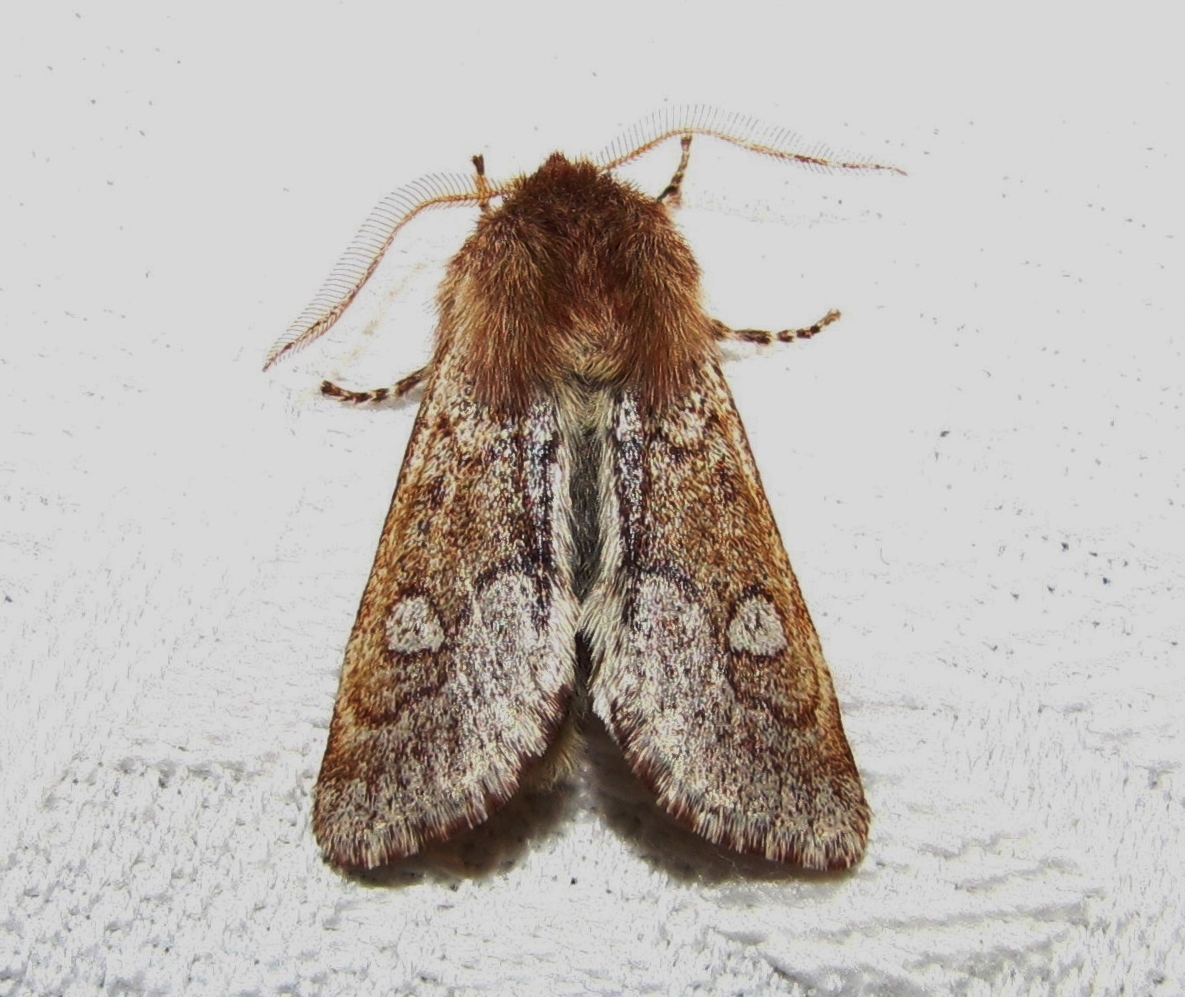

Scientific classification
- Kingdom: Animalia
- Phylum: Arthropoda
- Class: Insecta
- Order: Lepidoptera
- Superfamily: Noctuoidea
- Family: Noctuidae
- Genus: Psaphida
- Species: P. styracis

Binomial name
- Psaphida styracis Guenée, 1852

Synonyms
- Copipanolis styracis; Copipanolis cubilis; Copipanolis stigma; Copipanolis borealis; Copipanolis fasciata

= Psaphida styracis =

Species of moth

Psaphida styracis, commonly known as the fawn sallow, is a moth belonging to the family Noctuidae. The species was first described by Achille Guenée in 1852. It is native to the eastern parts of North America, and has also been introduced to the United Kingdom.

The wingspan is about 1.2-1.4 inches, or 31–37 millimeters. The moth flies from March to May depending on the location. There is one generation per year.

The larvae feed on Quercus species.
