= Daona mansueta =

Scientific classification
- Kingdom: Animalia
- Phylum: Arthropoda
- Clade: Pancrustacea
- Class: Insecta
- Order: Lepidoptera
- Superfamily: Noctuoidea
- Family: Erebidae
- Genus: Daona
- Species: D. mansueta

Binomial name
- Daona mansueta Walker, 1864

Synonyms
- Bocana digramma Walker, [1866]; Bocana erubescens Walker, [1866]; Catada ? detersalis Walker, [1866]; Gauzania mundalis Walker, [1866]; Madope[sic] vulpina Lucas, 1898; Thermesia? scitula Walker, [1866] 1865; Ozarba alopecodes Meyrick, 1902

Species of moth

Daona mansueta is a moth of the family Noctuidae first described by Francis Walker in 1864. It is found in Sri Lanka, Borneo, India, Myanmar, Peninsular Malaysia, the Philippines, Sumbawa, Seram, New Guinea and Australia.

== Description ==
Its ground colour is brownish. An oblique medial dark shade and dark marginal zone are found on the forewing. A faint reddish-brown fasciae is found on the hindwing. The discal mark consists of two black dots.
