= Psaphida damalis =

Scientific classification
- Kingdom: Animalia
- Phylum: Arthropoda
- Class: Insecta
- Order: Lepidoptera
- Superfamily: Noctuoidea
- Family: Noctuidae
- Genus: Psaphida
- Species: P. damalis

Binomial name
- Psaphida damalis (Grote, 1879)

Synonyms
- Eutolype damalis Grote, 1879

Species of moth

Psaphida damalis is a species of moth of the family Noctuidae first described by Augustus Radcliffe Grote in 1879. It is found in the US state of California.
