= Isogona texana =

Scientific classification
- Kingdom: Animalia
- Phylum: Arthropoda
- Class: Insecta
- Order: Lepidoptera
- Superfamily: Noctuoidea
- Family: Erebidae
- Genus: Isogona
- Species: I. texana

Binomial name
- Isogona texana (J. B. Smith, 1900)

Species of moth

Isogona texana is a species of moth of the family Erebidae. It is found in Texas.

The wingspan is about 24 mm.
