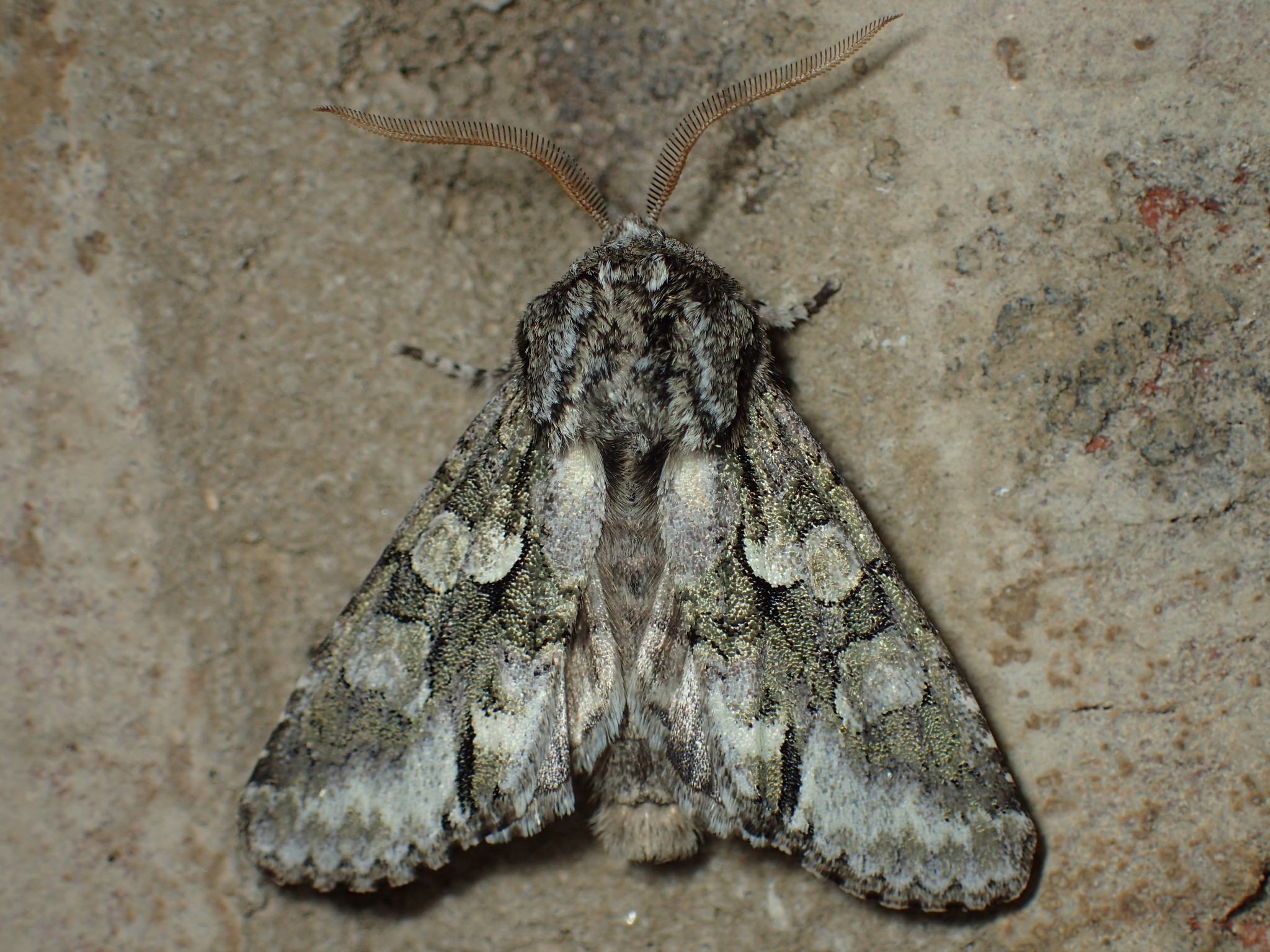

Scientific classification
- Kingdom: Animalia
- Phylum: Arthropoda
- Clade: Pancrustacea
- Class: Insecta
- Order: Lepidoptera
- Superfamily: Noctuoidea
- Family: Noctuidae
- Genus: Psaphida
- Species: P. resumens

Binomial name
- Psaphida resumens Walker, 1865

= Psaphida resumens =

Figure-eight sallow

Species of moth

Psaphida resumens, commonly named the figure-eight sallow, is a species of moth of the family Noctuidae. It is found from southern Ontario and Massachusetts to Florida, west to Texas, north to Minnesota.

The wingspan is 32–38 mm. Adults are on wing from March to May.

The larvae feed on the leaves of oak and maple.
