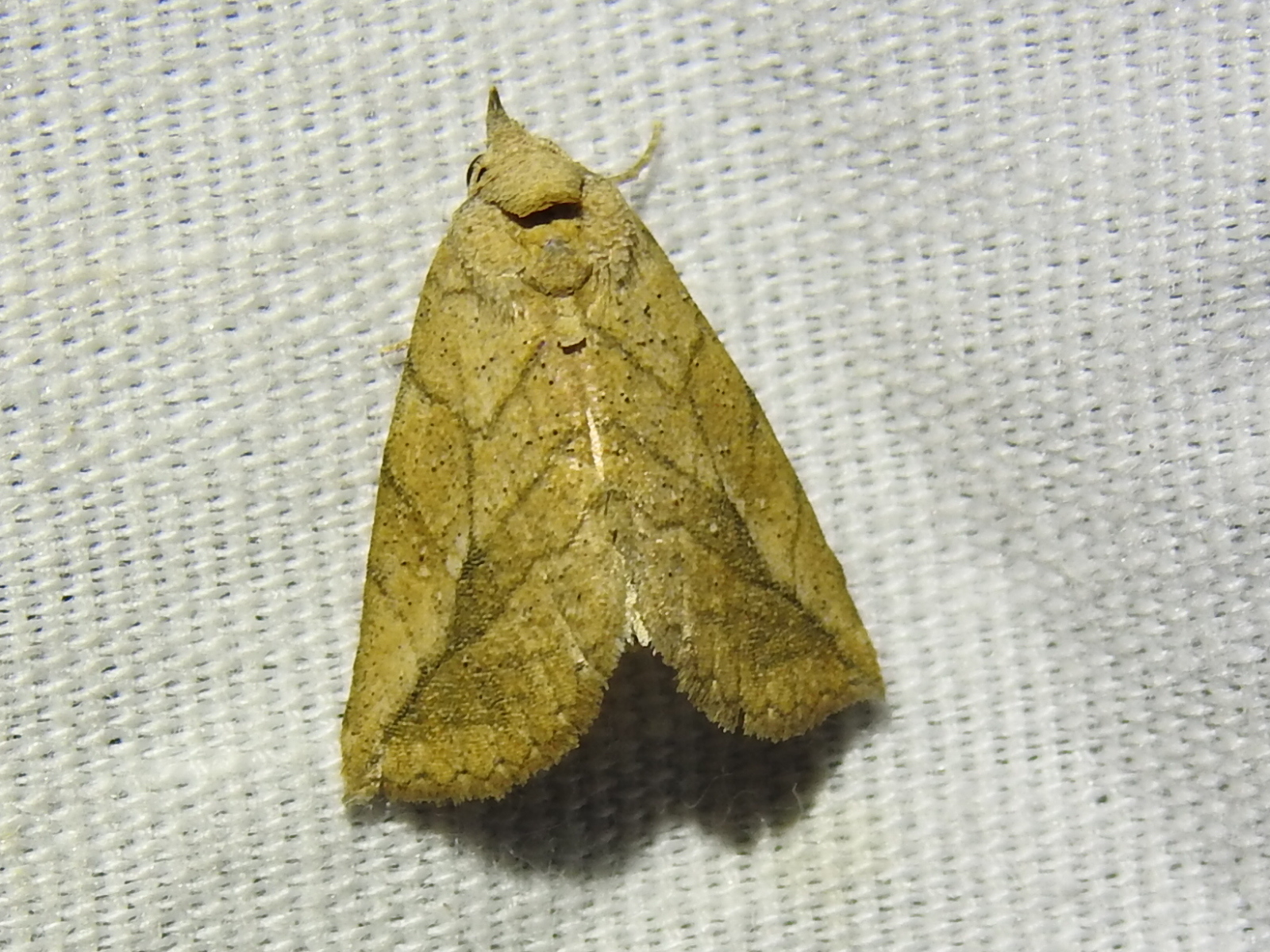

Scientific classification
- Domain: Eukaryota
- Kingdom: Animalia
- Phylum: Arthropoda
- Class: Insecta
- Order: Lepidoptera
- Superfamily: Noctuoidea
- Family: Erebidae
- Genus: Isogona
- Species: I. snowi

Binomial name
- Isogona snowi (J. B. Smith, 1908)

Synonyms
- Parora snowi J. B. Smith, 1908

= Isogona snowi =

Species of moth

Isogona snowi or Snow's owlet, is a moth of the family Erebidae. The species was first described by John B. Smith in 1908. It is found in southern Texas and Mexico.

The wingspan is 20–25 millimetres (0.79–0.98 in). Adults are on wing year round.

The larvae feed on Celtis pallida.
