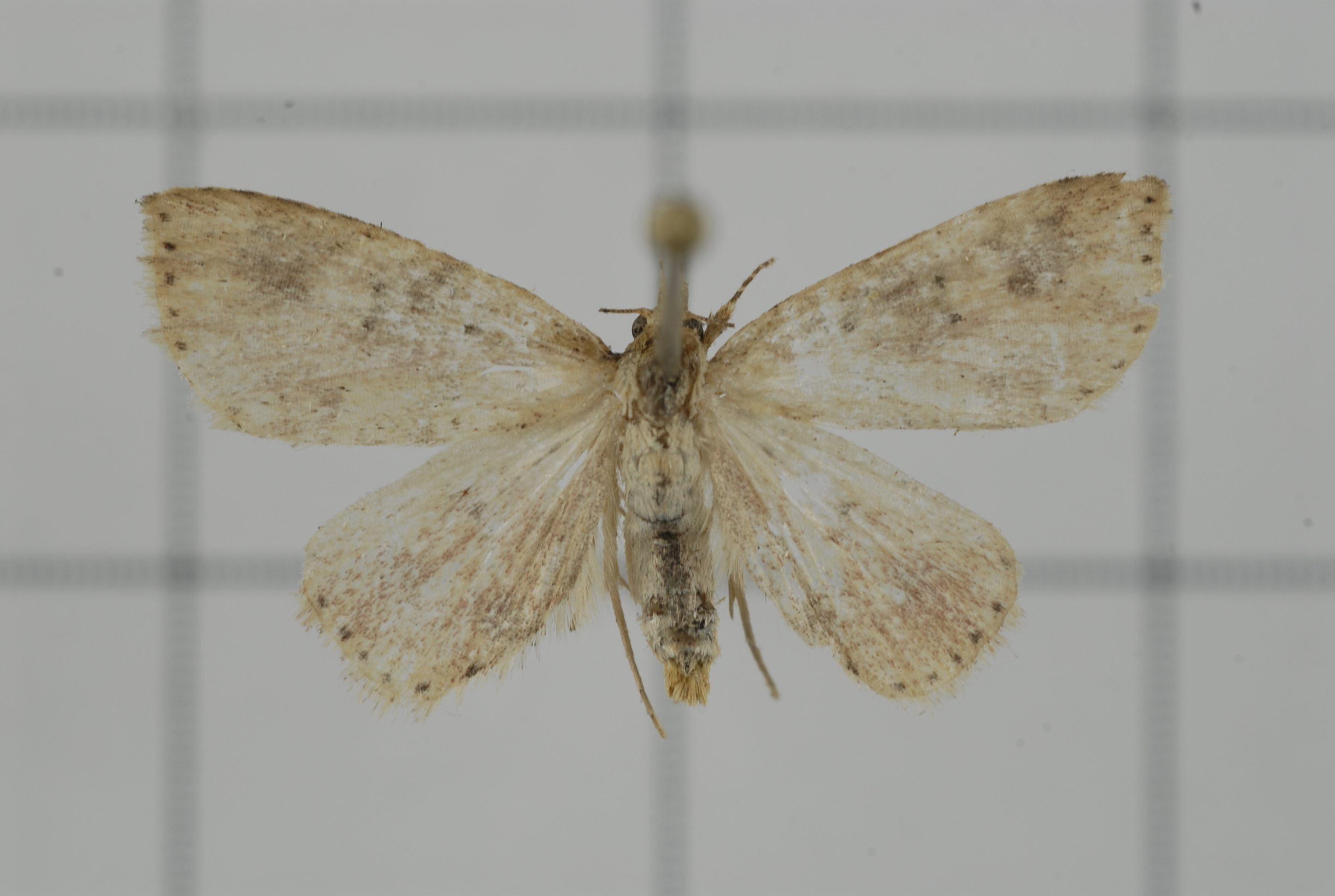
- Sarcopteron punctimargo

Scientific classification
- Kingdom: Animalia
- Phylum: Arthropoda
- Clade: Pancrustacea
- Class: Insecta
- Order: Lepidoptera
- Superfamily: Noctuoidea
- Family: Erebidae
- Genus: Dunira
- Species: D. punctimargo

Binomial name
- Dunira punctimargo (Hampson, 1893)

Synonyms
- Sarcopteron punctimargo Hampson, 1893

= Dunira punctimargo =

Species of moth

Dunira punctimargo is a moth of the family Noctuidae first described by George Hampson in 1893. It is found in Sri Lanka and Taiwan.
