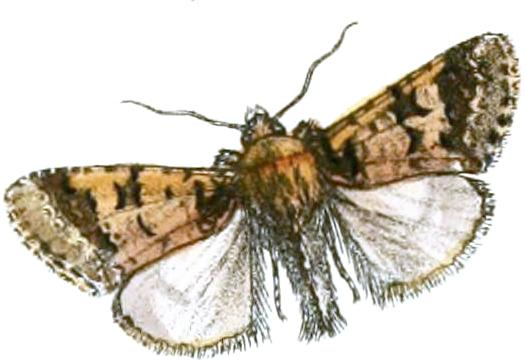

Scientific classification
- Domain: Eukaryota
- Kingdom: Animalia
- Phylum: Arthropoda
- Class: Insecta
- Order: Lepidoptera
- Superfamily: Noctuoidea
- Family: Noctuidae
- Genus: Diphtherocome
- Species: D. discibrunnea

Binomial name
- Diphtherocome discibrunnea (Moore, 1867)

Synonyms
- Diphthera discibrunnea Moore, 1867

= Diphtherocome discibrunnea =

Species of moth

Diphtherocome discibrunnea is a species of moth of the family Noctuidae. It is found in India.
