= Drepanoblemma =

Scientific classification
- Kingdom: Animalia
- Phylum: Arthropoda
- Class: Insecta
- Order: Lepidoptera
- Superfamily: Noctuoidea
- Family: Erebidae
- Subfamily: Calpinae
- Genus: Drepanoblemma; Hampson, 1926

Genus of moths

Drepanoblemma is a genus of moths of the family Erebidae. The genus was erected by George Hampson in 1926.

== Species ==
- Drepanoblemma incurvata Schaus, 1901
- Drepanoblemma partita Walker, 1865
