= Dectocraspedon =

Scientific classification
- Domain: Eukaryota
- Kingdom: Animalia
- Phylum: Arthropoda
- Class: Insecta
- Order: Lepidoptera
- Superfamily: Noctuoidea
- Family: Erebidae
- Subfamily: Herminiinae
- Genus: Dectocraspedon; Schaus, 1916

Genus of moths

Dectocraspedon is a genus of moths of the family Erebidae. The genus was erected by Schaus in 1916.

== Species ==
- Dectocraspedon braziliensis Schaus, 1916
- Dectocraspedon latefasciata Schaus, 1916
- Dectocraspedon lichenea Hampson
- Dectocraspedon obtusalis Schaus, 1916
