= Deinhugia =

Scientific classification
- Domain: Eukaryota
- Kingdom: Animalia
- Phylum: Arthropoda
- Class: Insecta
- Order: Lepidoptera
- Superfamily: Noctuoidea
- Family: Erebidae
- Subfamily: Calpinae
- Genus: Deinhugia; Laporte, 1974
- Species: D. nigra

Binomial name
- Deinhugia nigra Laporte, 1974

Genus of moths

Deinhugia is a monotypic moth genus of the family Erebidae. Its only species, Deinhugia nigra, is found in Cameroon and Gabon. Both the genus and the species were first described by Bernard Laporte in 1974.
