= Drepanorhina =

Scientific classification
- Kingdom: Animalia
- Phylum: Arthropoda
- Class: Insecta
- Order: Lepidoptera
- Superfamily: Noctuoidea
- Family: Erebidae
- Subfamily: Calpinae
- Genus: Drepanorhina; Hampson, 1926
- Species: D. shelfordi

Binomial name
- Drepanorhina shelfordi C. Swinhoe, 1904

Genus of moths

Drepanorhina is a monotypic moth genus of the family Erebidae erected by George Hampson 1926. Its only species, Drepanorhina shelfordi, was first described by Charles Swinhoe in 1904. It is found in Borneo.
