= Gigia =

Scientific classification
- Kingdom: Animalia
- Phylum: Arthropoda
- Class: Insecta
- Order: Lepidoptera
- Superfamily: Noctuoidea
- Family: Erebidae
- Subfamily: Calpinae
- Genus: Gigia; Walker, 1865

Synonyms
- Dochmiogramma Hampson, 1926

Genus of moths

Gigia is a genus of moths of the family Erebidae. The genus was erected by Francis Walker in 1865.

== Species ==
- Gigia obliqua Walker, 1865
- Gigia stenogaster Felder, 1874
