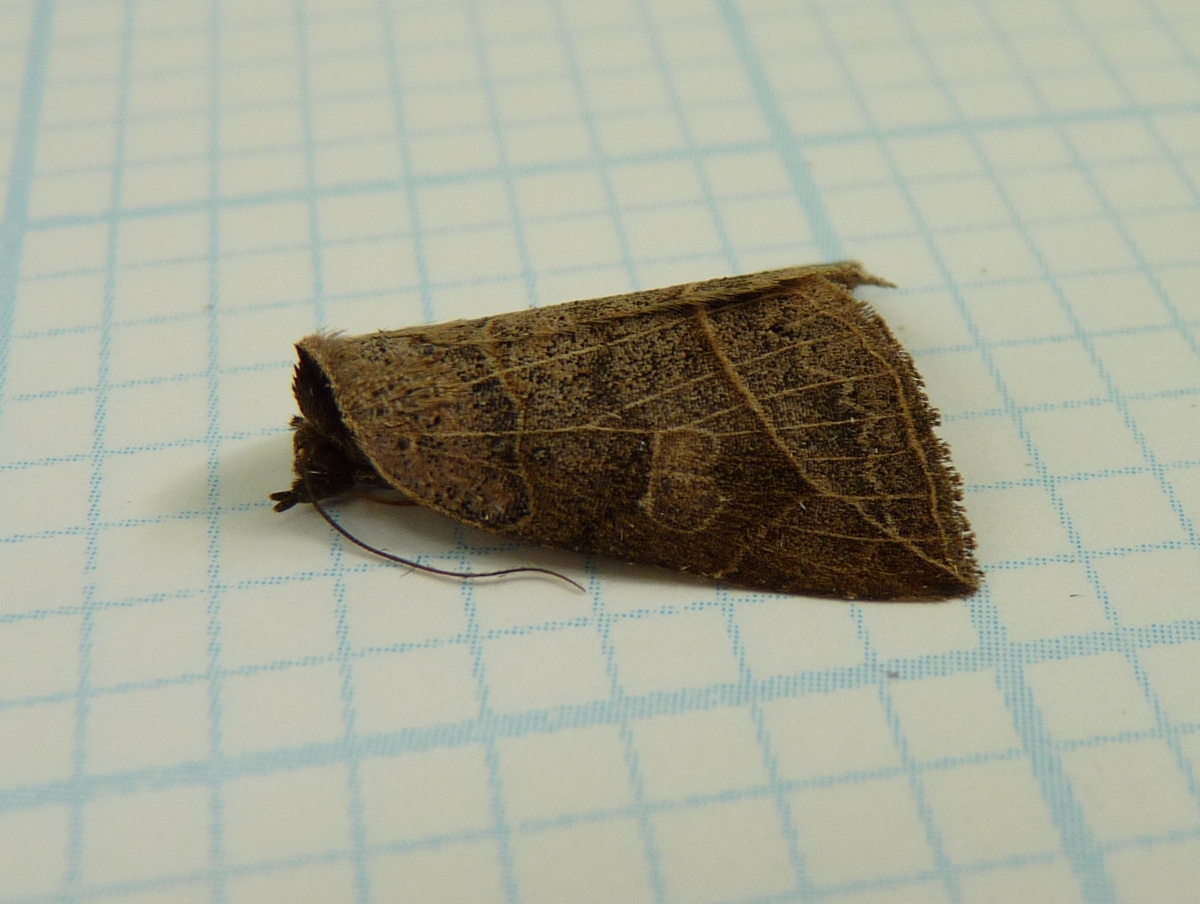
- Isogona tenuis

Scientific classification
- Kingdom: Animalia
- Phylum: Arthropoda
- Class: Insecta
- Order: Lepidoptera
- Superfamily: Noctuoidea
- Family: Erebidae
- Subfamily: Boletobiinae
- Genus: Isogona; Guenée in Boisduval & Guenée, 1852

Synonyms
- Massava Walker, 1865; Elocussa Walker, 1865; Pincia Walker, 1869; Eutoreuma Grote, 1872; Parora Smith, 1900; Diapera Hampson, 1926

= Isogona =

Genus of moths

Isogona is a genus of moths of the family Erebidae. The genus was erected by Achille Guenée in 1852.

== Taxonomy ==
The genus has previously been classified in the subfamily Phytometrinae within Erebidae or in the subfamily Calpinae of the family Noctuidae.

== Species ==
- Isogona natatrix Guenée, 1852
- Isogona punctipennis Grote, 1883
- Isogona scindens Walker, 1858
- Isogona segura Barnes, 1907
- Isogona snowi J. B. Smith, 1908 – Snow's owlet moth
- Isogona tenuis Grote, 1872 – thin-lined owlet moth
- Isogona texana J. B. Smith, 1900
