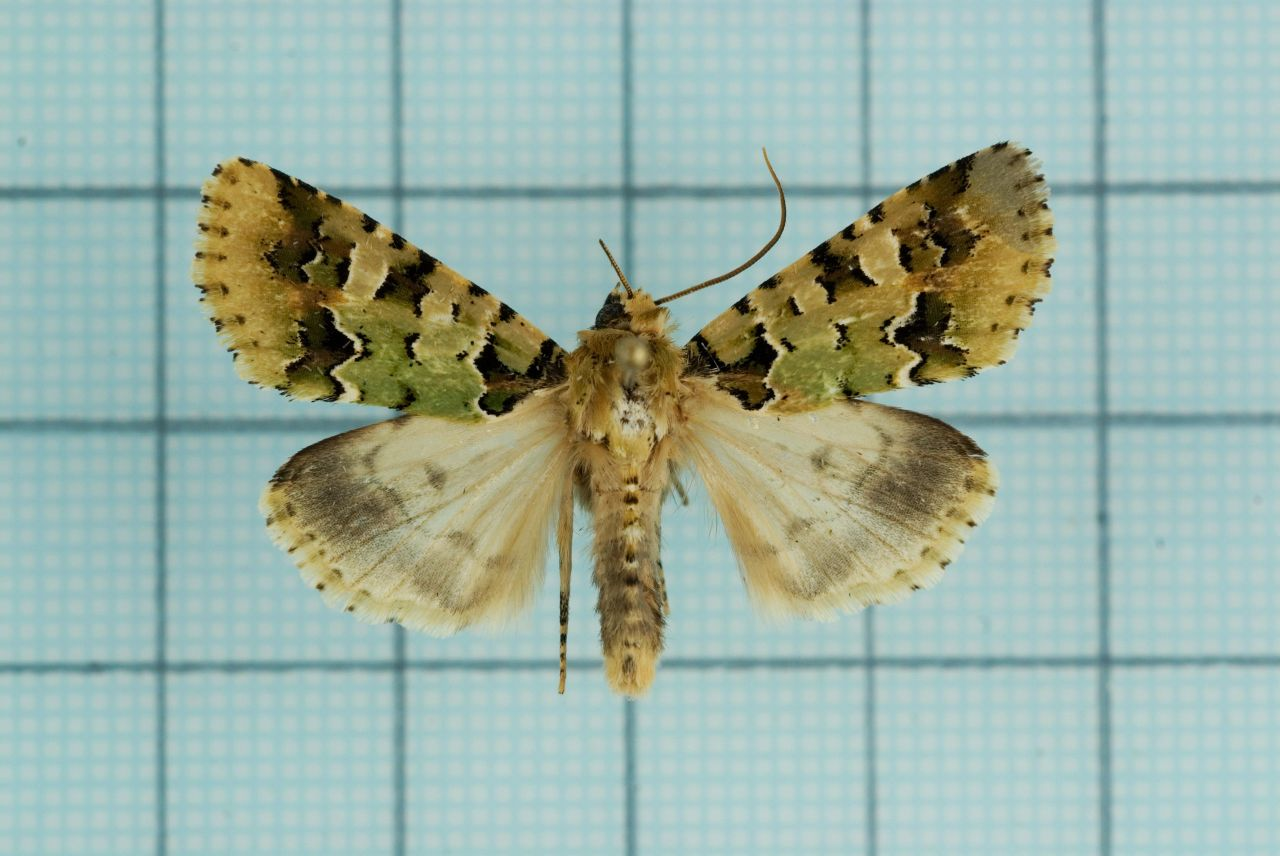
- Male
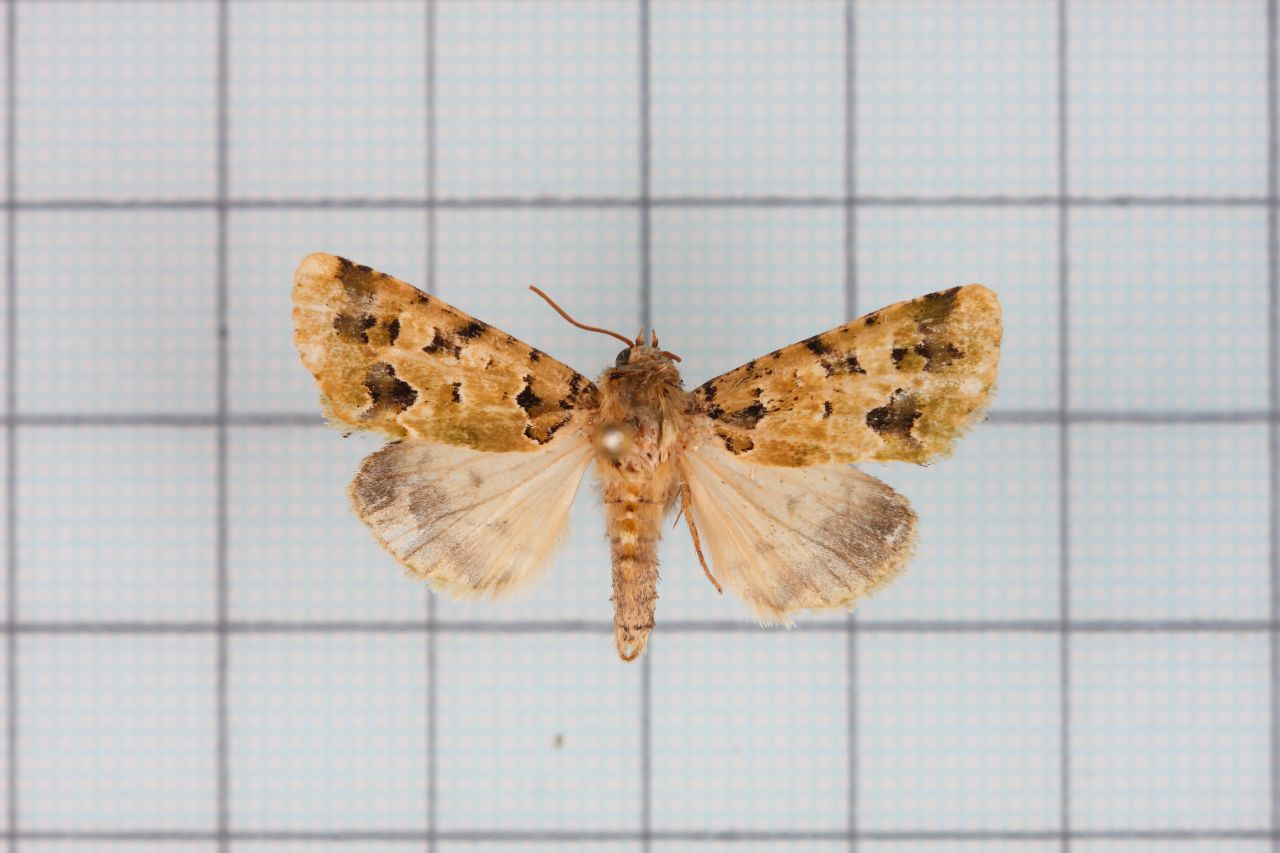
- Female

Scientific classification
- Domain: Eukaryota
- Kingdom: Animalia
- Phylum: Arthropoda
- Class: Insecta
- Order: Lepidoptera
- Superfamily: Noctuoidea
- Family: Noctuidae
- Genus: Diphtherocome
- Species: D. pulchra

Binomial name
- Diphtherocome pulchra (Wileman, 1912)

Synonyms
- Daseochaeta pulchra Wileman, 1912

= Diphtherocome pulchra =

Species of moth

Diphtherocome pulchra is a moth of the family Noctuidae. It is found in Taiwan.
