= Diapolia =

Scientific classification
- Kingdom: Animalia
- Phylum: Arthropoda
- Class: Insecta
- Order: Lepidoptera
- Superfamily: Noctuoidea
- Family: Erebidae
- Subfamily: Calpinae
- Genus: Diapolia; Hampson, 1926
- Species: D. magna

Binomial name
- Diapolia magna Leech, 1900

Genus of moths

Diapolia is a monotypic moth genus of the family Erebidae erected by George Hampson in 1926. Its only species, Diapolia magna, was first described by John Henry Leech in 1900. It is found in Sichuan, China.
