= Dolocucullia =

Scientific classification
- Domain: Eukaryota
- Kingdom: Animalia
- Phylum: Arthropoda
- Class: Insecta
- Order: Lepidoptera
- Superfamily: Noctuoidea
- Family: Noctuidae
- Subfamily: Cuculliinae
- Genus: Dolocucullia; Poole, 1995

Genus of moths

Dolocucullia is a genus of American moth in the family of Noctuidae.

== Species ==
- Dolocucullia dentilinea (Smith, 1899)
- Dolocucullia minor (Barnes & McDunnough, 1913)
