= Debrosania =

Scientific classification
- Kingdom: Animalia
- Phylum: Arthropoda
- Class: Insecta
- Order: Lepidoptera
- Superfamily: Noctuoidea
- Family: Noctuidae (?)
- Subfamily: Catocalinae
- Genus: Debrosania; Berio, 1993

Genus of moths

Debrosania is a genus of moths of the family Noctuidae erected by Emilio Berio in 1993. They are known from Tanzania.

Type-species: Debrosania puechredoni
