= Dysgnathia =

Scientific classification
- Domain: Eukaryota
- Kingdom: Animalia
- Phylum: Arthropoda
- Class: Insecta
- Order: Lepidoptera
- Superfamily: Noctuoidea
- Family: Noctuidae
- Subfamily: Acontiinae
- Genus: Dysgnathia; Warren in Seitz, 1913

Genus of moths

Dysgnathia is a genus of moths of the family Noctuidae. The genus was described by Warren in 1913.

== Species ==
- Dysgnathia albolineata (Bethune-Baker, 1906) New Guinea
- Dysgnathia mediopallens (Bethune-Baker, 1906) New Guinea
- Dysgnathia nigropunctata (Bethune-Baker, 1906) New Guinea, South Africa, Zimbabwe
