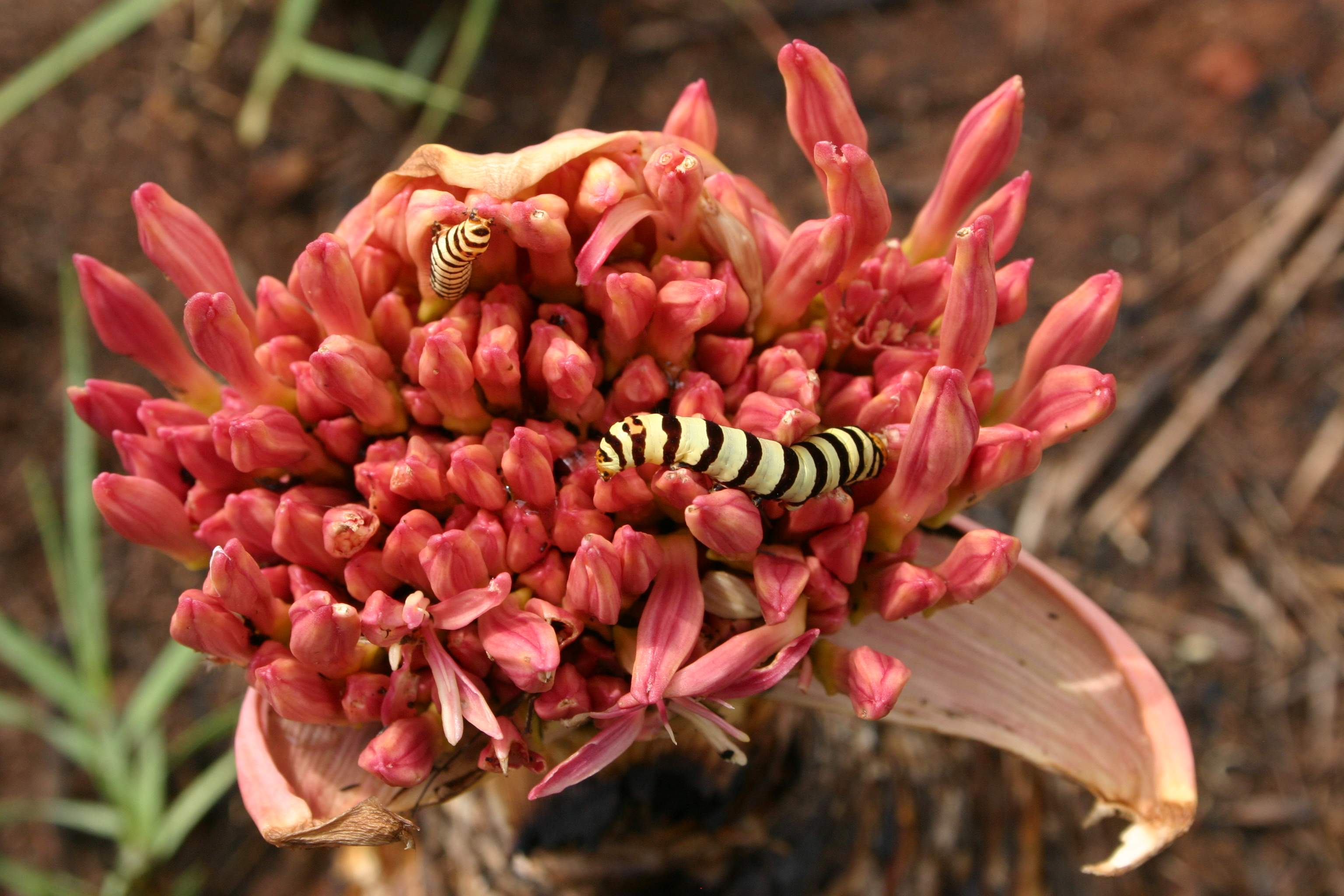
- Boophone disticha flowerhead with caterpillars of the Noctuid moth Diaphone eumela

Scientific classification
- Kingdom: Animalia
- Phylum: Arthropoda
- Clade: Pancrustacea
- Class: Insecta
- Order: Lepidoptera
- Superfamily: Noctuoidea
- Family: Noctuidae
- Genus: Diaphone; Hübner, 1820

Synonyms
- Taeniopyga Wallengren, 1858

= Diaphone (moth) =

Genus of moths

Diaphone is a genus of moths of the family Noctuidae.

== Species ==
- Diaphone angolensis Weymer, 1901
- Diaphone delamarei Viette, 1962
- Diaphone eumela (Stoll, [1782])
- Diaphone lampra Karsch, 1894
- Diaphone mossambicensis Hopffer, 1862
- Diaphone niveiplaga Carcasson, 1965
- Diaphone rungsi Laporte, 1973
