= Daona =

Scientific classification
- Kingdom: Animalia
- Phylum: Arthropoda
- Class: Insecta
- Order: Lepidoptera
- Superfamily: Noctuoidea
- Family: Erebidae
- Subfamily: Calpinae
- Genus: Daona; Walker, 1864

Genus of moths

Daona is a genus of moths of the family Noctuidae.

== Species ==
- Daona constellans Lucas, 1898
- Daona detersalis Walker, [1866]
- Daona mansueta Walker, 1864
