= Psaphida =

- Psaphida thaxteriana

Scientific classification
- Kingdom: Animalia
- Phylum: Arthropoda
- Class: Insecta
- Order: Lepidoptera
- Superfamily: Noctuoidea
- Family: Noctuidae
- Genus: Psaphida; Walker, 1865

Synonyms
- Copivaleria (Morrison, 1874); Dicopis Grote, 1874; Copipanolis Grote, 1874; Eutolype Grote, 1874; Psaphidia Dyar, 1901

Genus of moths

Psaphida is a genus of moths of the family Noctuidae. The genus was erected by Francis Walker in 1865.

== Species ==
- Psaphida resumens Walker, 1865 Florida - Texas, Arkansas, New England, Quebec, Minnesota, Illinois, Kansas, South Carolina
- Psaphida thaxterianus (Grote, 1874) Massachusetts, New York, Pennsylvania, Illinois, Missouri, Michigan, Ontario
- Psaphida rolandi (Grote, 1874) Massachusetts, Missouri, New England - Florida, Louisiana, Texas, Ontario, North Dakota, Manitoba
- Psaphida grandis (Smith, 1898) New York - Florida, Georgia, Wisconsin, Michigan, Illinois, Indiana, Ohio, Pennsylvania, Missouri, Texas
- Psaphida electilis (Morrison, 1875) southern New England to southern Ontario - Maryland, Wisconsin, Iowa, Kansas, Pennsylvania, Ohio, Missouri, Texas, Alabama
- Psaphida styracis (Guenée, 1852) southern Ontario to New England - Wisconsin, Minnesota, Missouri, Texas, Florida, West Virginia, Virginia, Kentucky, Tennessee, North Carolina
- Psaphida damalis (Grote, 1879) California, Colorado
- Psaphida palaearctica (Ronkay, Ronkay, Gyulai & Hacker, 2010) Shaanxi
Psaphida damalis

Psaphida grandis
