= Dialoxa =

Scientific classification
- Domain: Eukaryota
- Kingdom: Animalia
- Phylum: Arthropoda
- Class: Insecta
- Order: Lepidoptera
- Superfamily: Noctuoidea
- Family: Erebidae
- Subfamily: Calpinae
- Genus: Dialoxa; Druce, 1891

Genus of moths

Dialoxa is a genus of moths of the family Noctuidae.

== Species ==
It contains two species:

- Dialoxa arduine
- Dialoxa marcella
