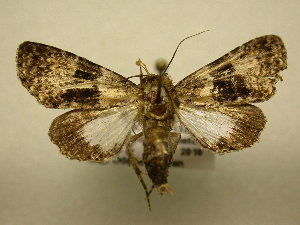
- Diopa creta

Scientific classification
- Kingdom: Animalia
- Phylum: Arthropoda
- Class: Insecta
- Order: Lepidoptera
- Superfamily: Noctuoidea
- Family: Erebidae
- Subfamily: Calpinae
- Genus: Diopa; Walker, 1858

= Diopa =

Genus of moths

Diopa is a genus of moths of the family Erebidae. The genus was erected by Francis Walker in 1858.

== Species ==
- Diopa corone Felder, 1874
- Diopa creta Druce, 1901
- Diopa furcula Walker, 1857
- Diopa magnetica Schaus, 1911
