= Dysglyptogona =

Scientific classification
- Domain: Eukaryota
- Kingdom: Animalia
- Phylum: Arthropoda
- Class: Insecta
- Order: Lepidoptera
- Superfamily: Noctuoidea
- Family: Erebidae
- Subfamily: Calpinae
- Genus: Dysglyptogona; Warren, 1889

Genus of moths

Dysglyptogona is a genus of moths of the family Erebidae. The genus was described by Warren in 1889.

== Species ==
- Dysglyptogona dissimilis Warren, 1889
- Dysglyptogona geminilinea Hampson, 1926
- Dysglyptogona morada Felder, 1874
- Dysglyptogona murifera Dognin, 1914
- Dysglyptogona striatura Hampson, 1926
