= Dogninades =

Scientific classification
- Domain: Eukaryota
- Kingdom: Animalia
- Phylum: Arthropoda
- Class: Insecta
- Order: Lepidoptera
- Superfamily: Noctuoidea
- Family: Erebidae
- Subfamily: Herminiinae
- Genus: Dogninades; Schaus, 1916
- Species: D. jactatalis

Binomial name
- Dogninades jactatalis (Walker, 1859) (sources vary)

Synonyms
- Hypena jactatalis Walker, [1859]49

Genus of moths

Dogninades is a monotypic moth genus of the family Erebidae described by Schaus in 1916. Its only species, Dogninades jactatalis, was first described by Francis Walker in 1859 (sources vary). It is found in Venezuela.
