= Ditrogoptera =

Scientific classification
- Kingdom: Animalia
- Phylum: Arthropoda
- Class: Insecta
- Order: Lepidoptera
- Superfamily: Noctuoidea
- Family: Noctuidae
- Subfamily: Acontiinae
- Genus: Ditrogoptera; Hampson, 1898
- Species: D. trilineata

Binomial name
- Ditrogoptera trilineata Hampson, 1898

Genus of moths

Ditrogoptera is a monotypic moth genus of the family Noctuidae. Its only species, Ditrogoptera trilineata, is found on Saint Vincent in the Caribbean. Both the genus and species were first described by George Hampson in 1898.
