= Dischalis =

Scientific classification
- Kingdom: Animalia
- Phylum: Arthropoda
- Class: Insecta
- Order: Lepidoptera
- Superfamily: Noctuoidea
- Family: Noctuidae
- Subfamily: Acontiinae
- Genus: Dischalis; Hampson, 1918
- Species: D. leucomera

Binomial name
- Dischalis leucomera Hampson, 1918

Genus of moths

Dischalis is a monotypic moth genus of the family Noctuidae. Its only species, Dischalis leucomera, is found in Chennai, India. Both the genus and species were first described by George Hampson in 1918.
