= Desertoplusia =

Scientific classification
- Domain: Eukaryota
- Kingdom: Animalia
- Phylum: Arthropoda
- Class: Insecta
- Order: Lepidoptera
- Superfamily: Noctuoidea
- Family: Noctuidae
- Subfamily: Plusiinae
- Genus: Desertoplusia; Klyuchko, 1984

Genus of moths

Desertoplusia is a genus of moths of the family Noctuidae.

== Species ==
- Desertoplusia bella Christoph, 1887
- Desertoplusia colornata Varga & Ronkay, 1991
- Desertoplusia paghmana Wiltshire, 1971
