= Drepanofoda =

Scientific classification
- Kingdom: Animalia
- Phylum: Arthropoda
- Class: Insecta
- Order: Lepidoptera
- Superfamily: Noctuoidea
- Family: Erebidae
- Subfamily: Calpinae
- Genus: Drepanofoda; Hampson, 1926
- Species: D. juncta

Binomial name
- Drepanofoda juncta Hampson, 1894

Synonyms
- Drepanofoda atrata C. Swinhoe, 1902

Genus of moths

Drepanofoda is a monotypic moth genus of the family Erebidae. Its only species, Drepanofoda juncta, is found in Sikkim, India. Both the genus and the species were first described by George Hampson, the genus in 1926 and the species in 1894.
