= Diagrapta =

Scientific classification
- Kingdom: Animalia
- Phylum: Arthropoda
- Class: Insecta
- Order: Lepidoptera
- Superfamily: Noctuoidea
- Family: Erebidae
- Subfamily: Calpinae
- Genus: Diagrapta; Hampson, 1926

Genus of moths

Diagrapta is a genus of moths of the family Erebidae. The genus was erected by George Hampson in 1926.

== Species ==
- Diagrapta albipunctata Warren, 1889
- Diagrapta bellula Schaus, 1913
- Diagrapta laminata Butler, 1879
- Diagrapta lignaria Felder, 1874
- Diagrapta oxydercina Hampson, 1926
