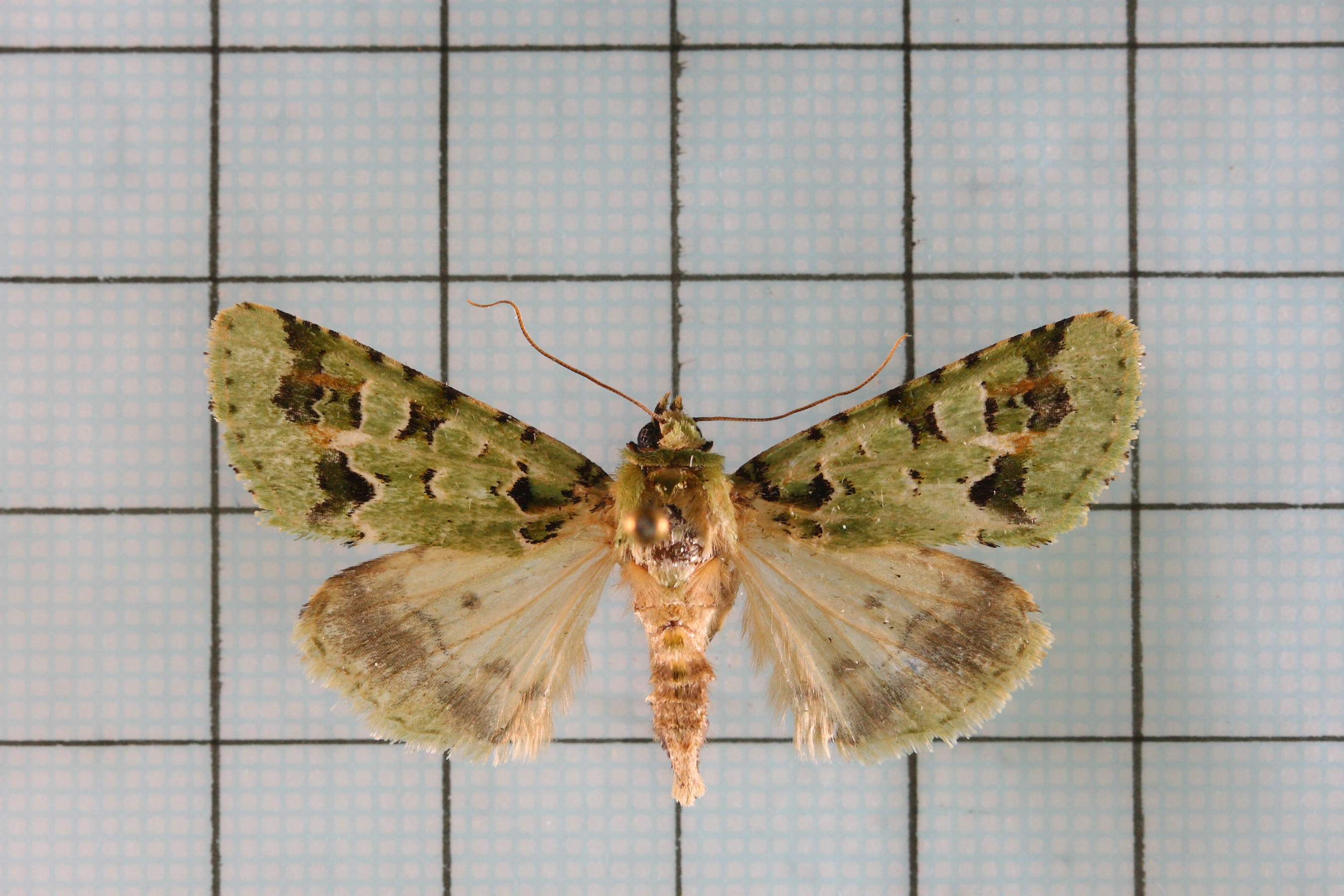

Scientific classification
- Domain: Eukaryota
- Kingdom: Animalia
- Phylum: Arthropoda
- Class: Insecta
- Order: Lepidoptera
- Superfamily: Noctuoidea
- Family: Noctuidae
- Genus: Diphtherocome
- Species: D. autumnalis

Binomial name
- Diphtherocome autumnalis (B.S. Chang, 1991)

Synonyms
- Daseochaeta autumnalis Chang, 1991

= Diphtherocome autumnalis =

Species of moth

Diphtherocome autumnalis is a moth in the family Noctuidae. It is found in Taiwan.
