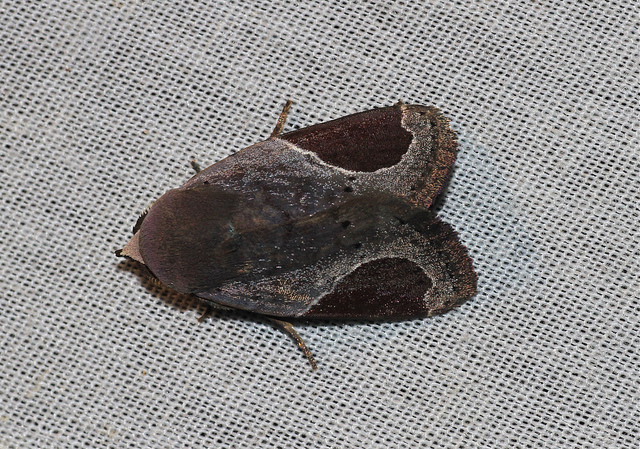
- Dyrzela plagiata, Borneo

Scientific classification
- Kingdom: Animalia
- Phylum: Arthropoda
- Class: Insecta
- Order: Lepidoptera
- Superfamily: Noctuoidea
- Family: Noctuidae
- Genus: Dyrzela; Walker, 1858

= Dyrzela =

Genus of moths

Dyrzela is a genus of moths of the family Noctuidae.

== Species ==
- Dyrzela bosca Swinhoe, 1890
- Dyrzela boscoides Holloway, 1989
- Dyrzela castanea Warren, 1913
- Dyrzela incrassata Walker, 1858
- Dyrzela increnulata Warren, 1913
- Dyrzela plagiata Walker, 1858
- Dyrzela roseata Holloway, 1989
- Dyrzela squamata Warren, 1913
- Dyrzela trichoptera Robinson, 1975
- Dyrzela tumidimacula Warren, 1913
- Dyrzela violacea Holloway, 1989
