= Dymba =

Scientific classification
- Kingdom: Animalia
- Phylum: Arthropoda
- Class: Insecta
- Order: Lepidoptera
- Superfamily: Noctuoidea
- Family: Noctuidae
- Subfamily: Acontiinae
- Genus: Dymba; Dyar, 1914
- Species: D. coryphata

Binomial name
- Dymba coryphata Dyar, 1914

Genus of moths

Dymba is a genus of moths of the family Noctuidae. Its only species, Dymba coryphata, is found in Panama. Both the genus and species were first described by Harrison Gray Dyar Jr. in 1914.
