= Drepanoperas =

Scientific classification
- Kingdom: Animalia
- Phylum: Arthropoda
- Class: Insecta
- Order: Lepidoptera
- Superfamily: Noctuoidea
- Family: Erebidae
- Subfamily: Calpinae
- Genus: Drepanoperas; Hampson, 1926
- Species: D. falcigera

Binomial name
- Drepanoperas falcigera Walker, 1858

Genus of moths

Drepanoperas is a monotypic moth genus of the family Erebidae erected by George Hampson in 1926. Its only species, Drepanoperas falcigera, was first described by Francis Walker in 1858. It is found in Brazil.
