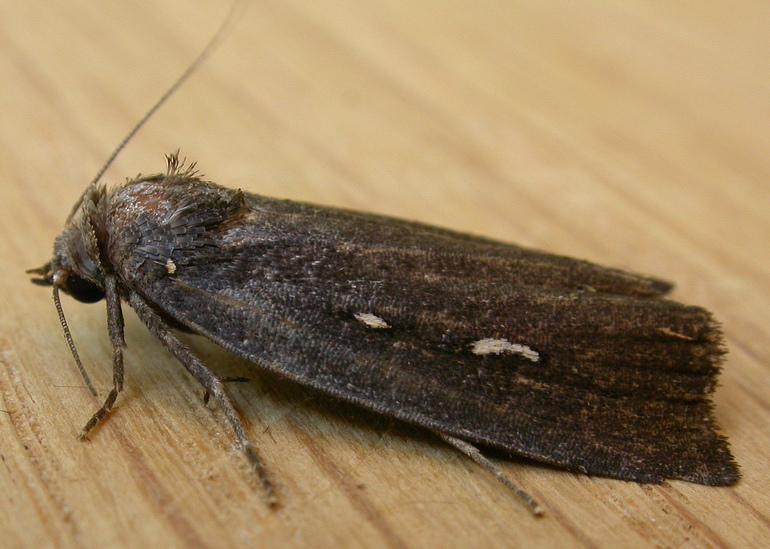
- Egone atrisquamata

Scientific classification
- Kingdom: Animalia
- Phylum: Arthropoda
- Class: Insecta
- Order: Lepidoptera
- Superfamily: Noctuoidea
- Family: Erebidae
- Subfamily: Calpinae
- Genus: Egone; Walker, 1863

Synonyms
- Dnopheropis Turner, 1902; Capelica Turner, 1944

= Egone =

Genus of moths

Egone is a genus of moths of the family Erebidae first described by Francis Walker in 1863.

== Species ==
- Egone atrisquamata Hampson, 1926
- Egone bipunctalis Walker, 1863
