= Diadocis =

Scientific classification
- Kingdom: Animalia
- Phylum: Arthropoda
- Clade: Pancrustacea
- Class: Insecta
- Order: Lepidoptera
- Superfamily: Noctuoidea
- Family: Noctuidae
- Genus: Diadocis; Saalmüller, 1891

Type species
- Diadocis longimacula Saalmüller, 1891

Genus of moths

Diadocis is a genus of moths of the family Noctuidae.

== Species ==
- Diadocis longimacula Saalmüller, 1891
- Diadocis remyi (Viette, 1954)
- Diadocis sarodrano Viette, 1982
