= Drucuma =

Scientific classification
- Domain: Eukaryota
- Kingdom: Animalia
- Phylum: Arthropoda
- Class: Insecta
- Order: Lepidoptera
- Superfamily: Noctuoidea
- Family: Erebidae
- Subfamily: Herminiinae
- Genus: Drucuma; Schaus, 1916
- Species: D. apicata

Binomial name
- Drucuma apicata (H. Druce, 1891)

Genus of insects

Drucuma is a monotypic moth genus of the family Noctuidae described by Schaus in 1916. Its only species, Drucuma apicata, was first described by Herbert Druce in 1891. It is found in Mexico and Guatemala.
