= Drepanophiletis =

Scientific classification
- Kingdom: Animalia
- Phylum: Arthropoda
- Class: Insecta
- Order: Lepidoptera
- Superfamily: Noctuoidea
- Family: Erebidae
- Subfamily: Calpinae
- Genus: Drepanophiletis; Hampson, 1926

Genus of moths

Drepanophiletis is a genus of moths of the family Erebidae. The genus was erected by George Hampson in 1926.

== Species ==
- Drepanophiletis castaneata Hampson, 1926
- Drepanophiletis hypocaloides Holland, 1894
- Drepanophiletis siderosticta Holland, 1894
