= Decticryptis =

Scientific classification
- Kingdom: Animalia
- Phylum: Arthropoda
- Class: Insecta
- Order: Lepidoptera
- Superfamily: Noctuoidea
- Family: Noctuidae
- Subfamily: Acontiinae
- Genus: Decticryptis; Hampson, 1910

Genus of moths

Decticryptis is a genus of moths of the family Noctuidae. The genus was erected by George Hampson in 1910.

== Species ==
- Decticryptis deleta (Moore, [1885]) Sri Lanka
- Decticryptis producta Holloway, 2009 north-eastern Himalaya, Borneo, Bali, Sumbaba, Ambon, New Guinea, Australia
- Decticryptis pulchra Holloway, 2009 Borneo
