= Dusponera =

Scientific classification
- Domain: Eukaryota
- Kingdom: Animalia
- Phylum: Arthropoda
- Class: Insecta
- Order: Lepidoptera
- Superfamily: Noctuoidea
- Family: Erebidae
- Subfamily: Herminiinae
- Genus: Dusponera; Dognin, 1914

Synonyms
- Dusponera Schaus, 1916

Genus of moths

Dusponera is a genus of moths of the family Erebidae. The genus was erected by Paul Dognin in 1914.

== Species ==
- Dusponera fannia Schaus, 1916 French Guiana
- Dusponera semifalcata Dognin, 1914 Ecuador
