= Dolichosomastis =

Scientific classification
- Kingdom: Animalia
- Phylum: Arthropoda
- Class: Insecta
- Order: Lepidoptera
- Superfamily: Noctuoidea
- Family: Erebidae
- Subfamily: Calpinae
- Genus: Dolichosomastis; Hampson, 1924

Genus of moths

Dolichosomastis is a genus of moths of the family Erebidae. The genus was erected by George Hampson in 1924.

== Species ==
- Dolichosomastis archadia Stoll, 1790
- Dolichosomastis dorsilinea Dyar, 1910
- Dolichosomastis hannibal Schaus, 1914
- Dolichosomastis leucogrammica Hampson, 1924
