= Delocoma =

Scientific classification
- Domain: Eukaryota
- Kingdom: Animalia
- Phylum: Arthropoda
- Class: Insecta
- Order: Lepidoptera
- Superfamily: Noctuoidea
- Family: Erebidae
- Subfamily: Calpinae
- Genus: Delocoma; Swinhoe, 1905
- Species: D. marmorea

Binomial name
- Delocoma marmorea Swinhoe, 1905

Genus of moths

Delocoma is a monotypic moth genus of the family Erebidae. Its only species, Delocoma marmorea, is found in Sulawesi. Both the genus and the species were first described by Charles Swinhoe in 1905.
