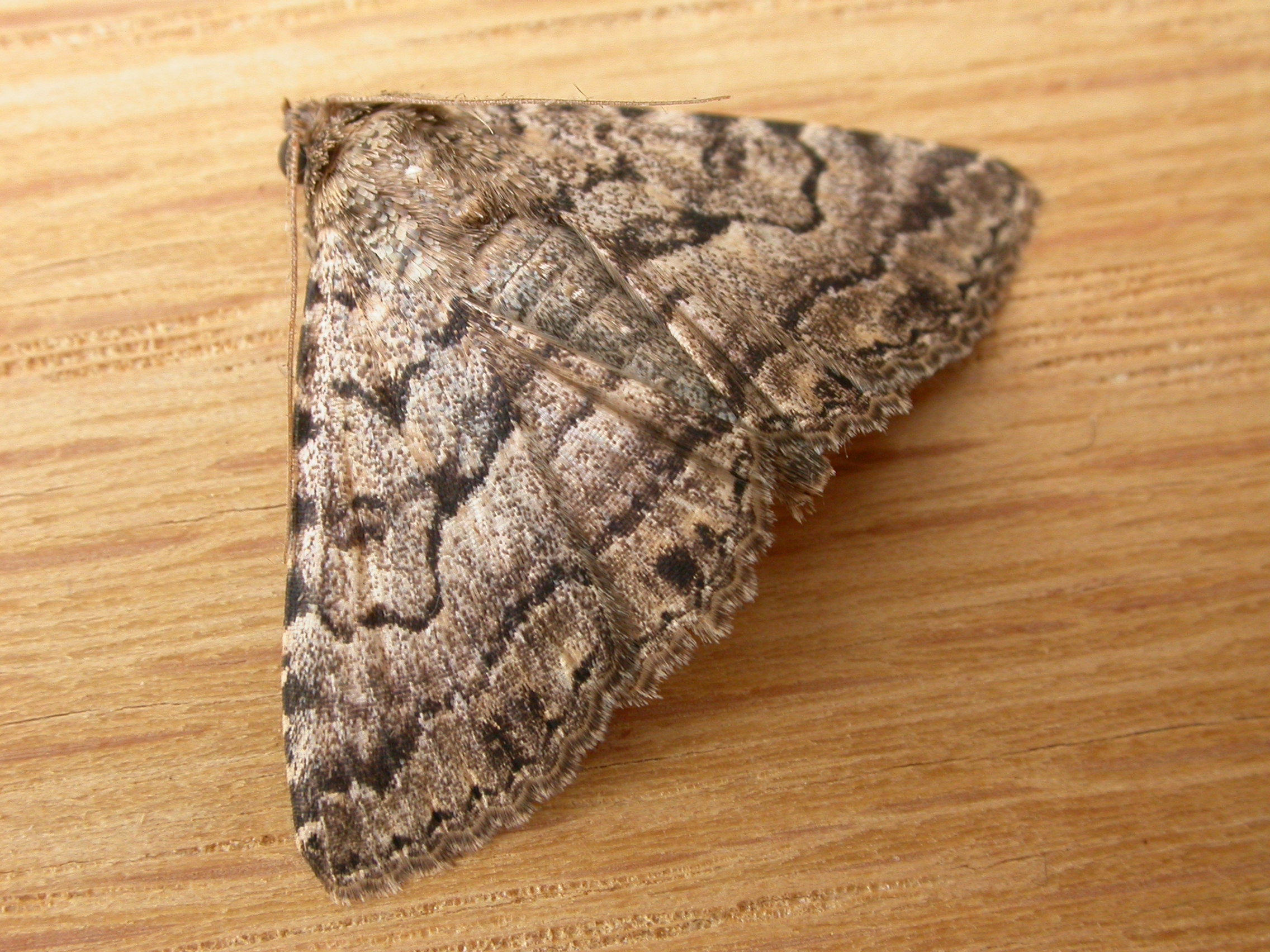

Scientific classification
- Kingdom: Animalia
- Phylum: Arthropoda
- Class: Insecta
- Order: Lepidoptera
- Superfamily: Noctuoidea
- Family: Erebidae
- Subfamily: Calpinae
- Genus: Diatenes; Guenée in Boisduval & Guenée, 1852

Synonyms
- Setida Walker, 1858

= Diatenes =

Genus of moths

Diatenes is a genus of moths of the family Erebidae.

== Species ==
- Diatenes aglossoides Guenée, 1852
- Diatenes chalybescens Guenée, 1852
- Diatenes gerula Guenée, 1852
- Diatenes igneipicta Lower, 1902
