= Hapda =

Scientific classification
- Kingdom: Animalia
- Phylum: Arthropoda
- Class: Insecta
- Order: Lepidoptera
- Superfamily: Noctuoidea
- Family: Erebidae
- Subfamily: Hypeninae
- Genus: Hapda; Nye, 1975
- Species: H. exhibens

Binomial name
- Hapda exhibens (Walker, 1863)

Synonyms
- Genus: Dapha Walker, 1863; Species: Dapha exhibens Walker, 1863; Oglasa opalescens Hampson, 1926

Genus of moths

Hapda is a monotypic moth genus of the family Erebidae described by Nye in 1975. It was first described by Francis Walker in 1863 as Dapha. Its only species, Hapda exhibens, was described by Walker in 1863.
