= Diplonephra =

Scientific classification
- Kingdom: Animalia
- Phylum: Arthropoda
- Class: Insecta
- Order: Lepidoptera
- Superfamily: Noctuoidea
- Family: Noctuidae
- Genus: Diplonephra; Turner, 1920

Genus of moths

Diplonephra is a genus of moths of the family Noctuidae.

== Species ==
- Diplonephra ditata (Lucas, 1892)
