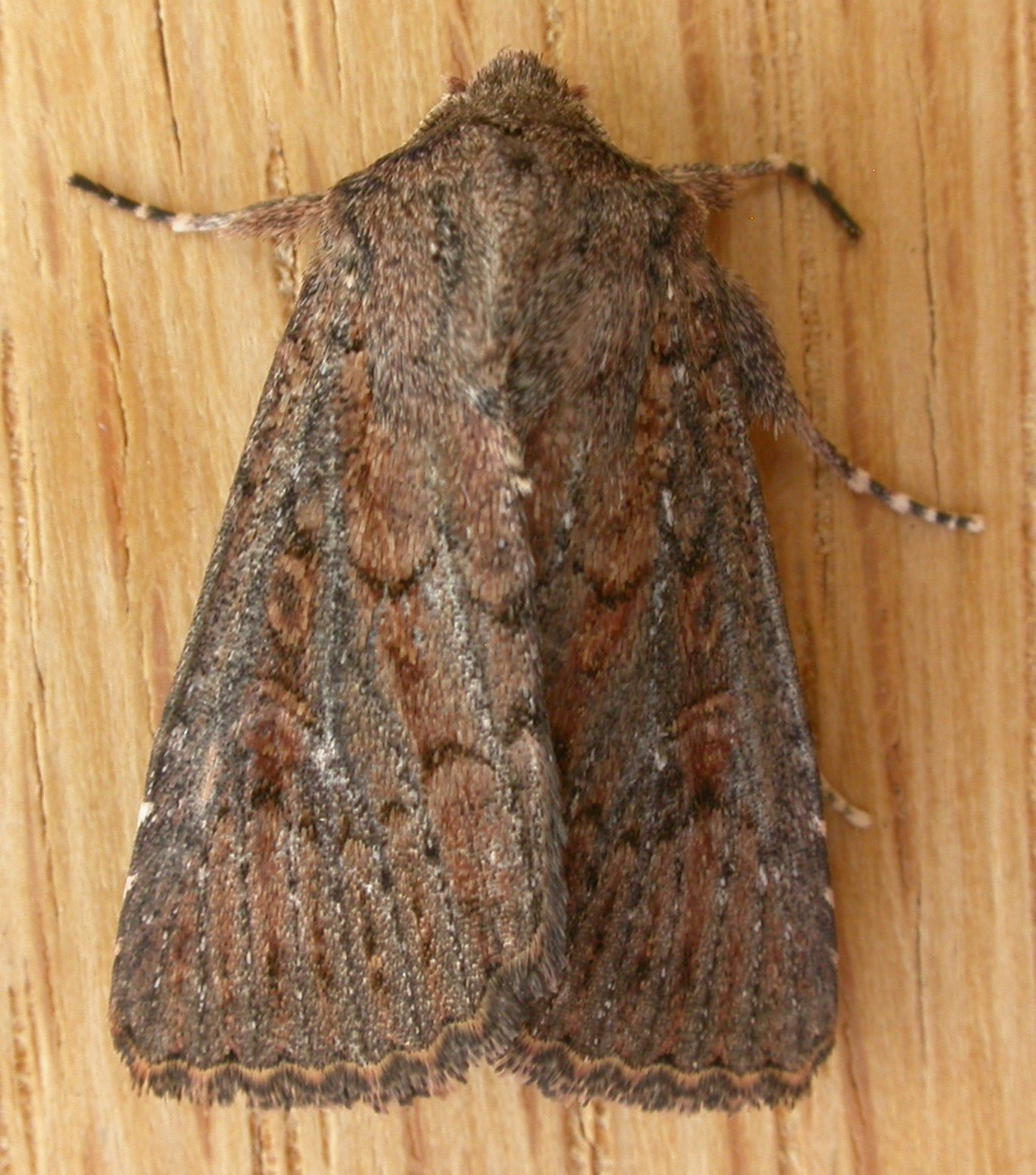
- Dasygaster padockina

Scientific classification
- Kingdom: Animalia
- Phylum: Arthropoda
- Class: Insecta
- Order: Lepidoptera
- Superfamily: Noctuoidea
- Family: Noctuidae
- Genus: Dasygaster; Guenée in Boisduval & Guenée, 1852

= Dasygaster =

Genus of moths

Dasygaster is a genus of moths of the family Noctuidae.

== Species ==
- Dasygaster atrata (Turner, 1931)
- Dasygaster cremnodes (Lower, 1893)
- Dasygaster dictyota (Lower, 1902)
- Dasygaster epipolia (Turner, 1920)
- Dasygaster epundoides (Guenée, 1852)
- Dasygaster eudmeta (Turner, 1939)
- Dasygaster ligniplena (Walker, 1857)
- Dasygaster melambaphes (Turner, 1925)
- Dasygaster obumbrata (Lucas, 1894)
- Dasygaster oressigenes (Turner, 1925)
- Dasygaster padockina (Le Guillou, 1841)
- Dasygaster pammacha (Turner, 1922)
- Dasygaster punctosa (Walker, 1857)
