= Dunira =

Scientific classification
- Domain: Eukaryota
- Kingdom: Animalia
- Phylum: Arthropoda
- Class: Insecta
- Order: Lepidoptera
- Superfamily: Noctuoidea
- Family: Erebidae
- Subfamily: Boletobiinae
- Genus: Dunira; Moore, [1885]

Synonyms
- Eclipsea Hampson, 1926; Sarcopteron Hampson, 1893

Genus of moths

Dunira is a genus of moths of the family Erebidae. The genus was erected by Frederic Moore in 1885.

== Species ==
- Dunira calcara Holloway, 2005 Borneo
- Dunira diplogramma (Hampson, 1912) Sri Lanka
- Dunira fasciata Wileman & South, 1917 Japan
- Dunira luna (Hampson, 1891) Nilgiri
- Dunira lunapex Holloway, 2005 Borneo, Singapore
- Dunira maculapes (Hampson, 1893) Sri Lanka
- Dunira minoralis (Hampson, 1907) Sri Lanka
- Dunira obliquilinea Hampson, 1926 Singapore, Peninsular Malaysia, Borneo, Bali, Andamans, Nicobars, Seram
- Dunira pulchra (Bethune-Baker, 1908) New Guinea
- Dunira punctimargo (Hampson, 1893) Sri Lanka, Taiwan
- Dunira rectilineata (Hampson, 1896) Sri Lanka
- Dunira rubripunctalis (Walker, [1859]) Sri Lanka, Peninsular Malaysia, Borneo, New Guinea, Queensland
- Dunira scitula (Walker, 1865) Sri Lanka, Peninsular Malaysia, Borneo
- Dunira subapicalis (C. Swinhoe, 1905) Assam
