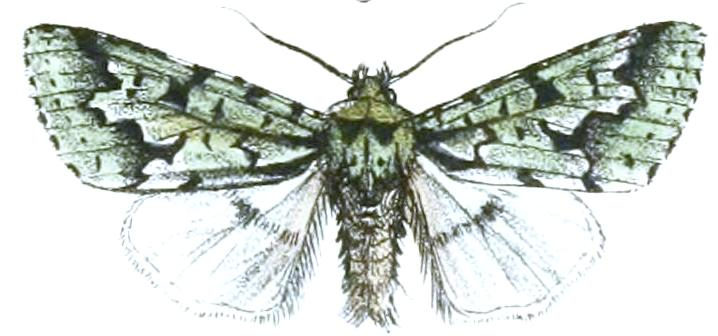
- Diphtherocome pallida

Scientific classification
- Domain: Eukaryota
- Kingdom: Animalia
- Phylum: Arthropoda
- Class: Insecta
- Order: Lepidoptera
- Superfamily: Noctuoidea
- Family: Noctuidae
- Subfamily: Acronictinae
- Genus: Diphtherocome; Warren, 1907

= Diphtherocome =

Genus of moths

Diphtherocome is a genus of moths of the family Noctuidae.

== Species ==
- Diphtherocome autumnalis (Chang, 1991)
- Diphtherocome abbreviata Sugi, 1968
- Diphtherocome brevipennis (Hampson, 1909)
- Diphtherocome burmana Berio, 1973
- Diphtherocome chrysochlora (Hampson, 1898)
- Diphtherocome discibrunnea (Moore, 1867)
- Diphtherocome fasciata (Moore, 1888)
- Diphtherocome marmorea (Leech, 1900)
- Diphtherocome metaphaea (Hampson, 1909)
- Diphtherocome muscosa (Hampson, 1891)
- Diphtherocome pallida (Moore, 1867)
- Diphtherocome pulchra (Wileman, 1912)
- Diphtherocome verbenata (Distant, 1898)
- Diphtherocome vigens (Walker, 1865)
- Diphtherocome vivida (Leech, 1900)
