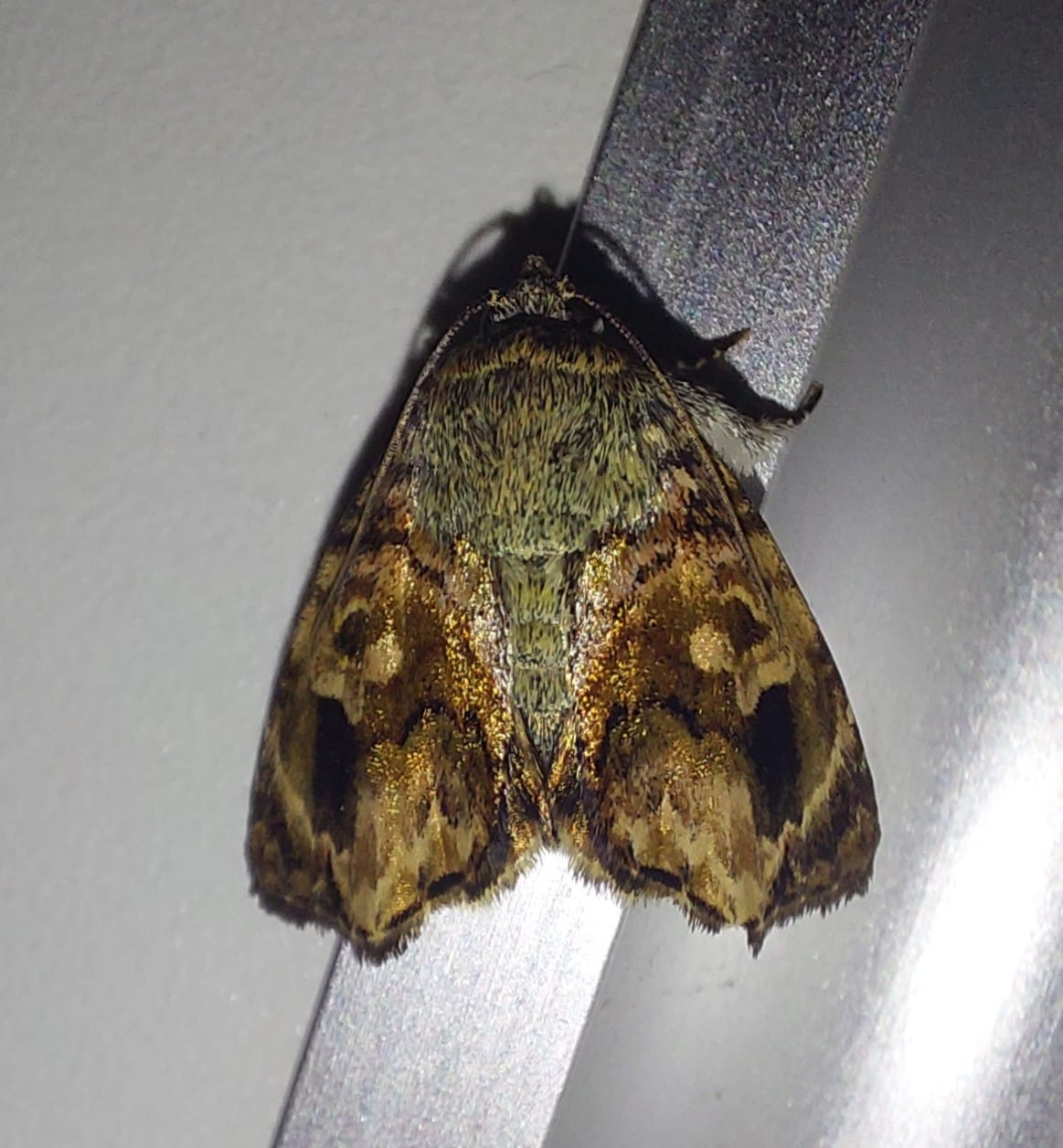

Scientific classification
- Kingdom: Animalia
- Phylum: Arthropoda
- Class: Insecta
- Order: Lepidoptera
- Superfamily: Noctuoidea
- Family: Noctuidae
- Subfamily: Acontiinae
- Genus: Drobeta; Walker, 1858

Synonyms
- Angitia Walker, 1858; Blancharditia Biezanko & Rufinelli, 1963

= Drobeta =

Genus of moths

Drobeta is a genus of moths of the family Noctuidae. The genus was erected by Francis Walker in 1858.

== Species ==
- Drobeta albicauda (Hampson, 1910)
- Drobeta albirufa (Druce, 1909)
- Drobeta andrevia (Schaus, 1921)
- Drobeta atrisigna (Dognin, 1910)
- Drobeta brephus Dyar, 1914
- Drobeta bullata Schaus, 1911
- Drobeta caliginosa (Schaus, 1911)
- Drobeta carneopicta (Hampson, 1910)
- Drobeta crepuscula (Schaus, 1921)
- Drobeta delectans (Walker, 1857)
- Drobeta directa (Walker, 1858)
- Drobeta eriopica (Hampson, 1910)
- Drobeta esmeralda (Hampson, 1914)
- Drobeta esthera (Schaus, 1921)
- Drobeta exscendens Walker, 1858
- Drobeta flavidorsum (Hampson, 1914)
- Drobeta fuscosa (E. D. Jones, 1915/1914)
- Drobeta grandis (Schaus, 1911)
- Drobeta hermione (Schaus, 1914)
- Drobeta ithaca Druce, 1889
- Drobeta ligneola (Schaus, 1911)
- Drobeta medioplica (Hampson, 1918)
- Drobeta melagonia Hampson, 1910
- Drobeta melamera (Hampson, 1910)
- Drobeta mesoscota (Hampson, 1910)
- Drobeta ochriplaga (Hampson, 1910)
- Drobeta onerosa (Schaus, 1914)
- Drobeta orestes (Schaus, 1914)
- Drobeta perplexa (Schaus, 1904)
- Drobeta phaeobasis Hampson, 1910
- Drobeta poliosema (Hampson, 1914)
- Drobeta pulchra (Schaus, 1904)
- Drobeta seminigra (Hampson, 1918)
- Drobeta thacia (Schaus, 1914)
- Drobeta tiresias Druce, 1889
- Drobeta tristigma (Dyar, 1914)
- Drobeta viridans (Schaus, 1904)
