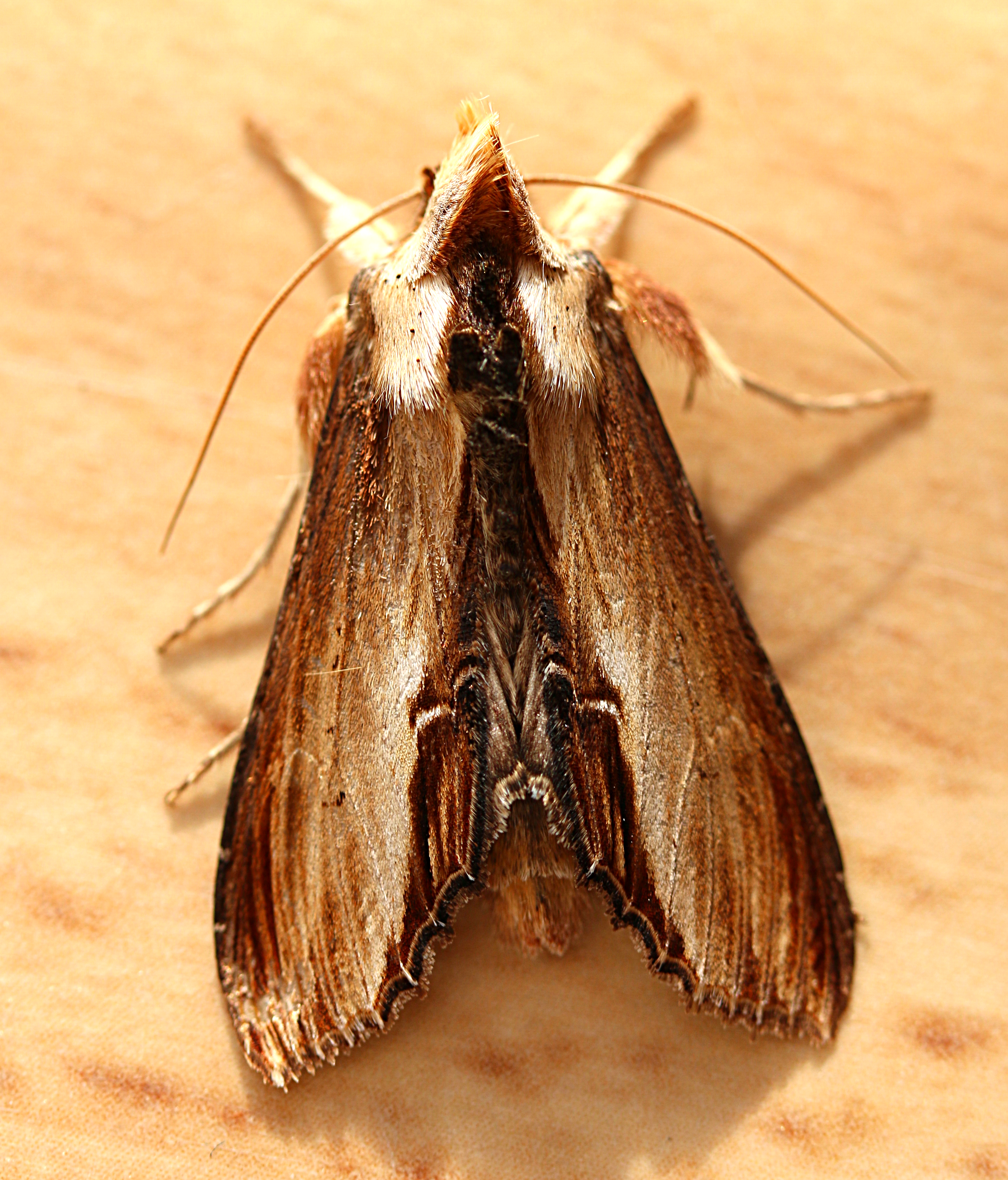
- Cucullia verbasci

Scientific classification
- Kingdom: Animalia
- Phylum: Arthropoda
- Clade: Pancrustacea
- Class: Insecta
- Order: Lepidoptera
- Superfamily: Noctuoidea
- Family: Noctuidae
- Subfamily: Cuculliinae

Genera
- See text

= Cuculliinae =

Subfamily of moths

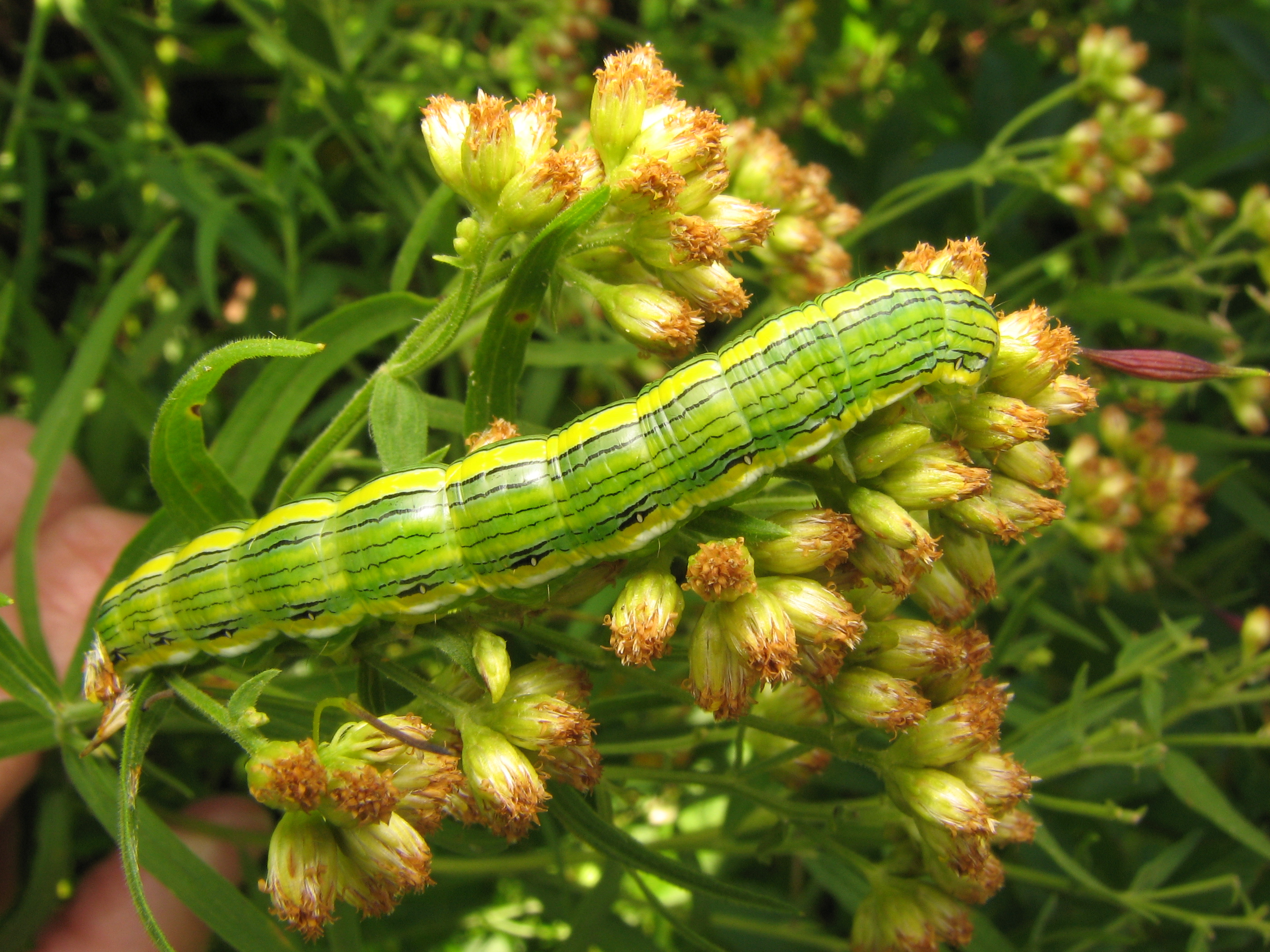
Cucullia asteroides, caterpillar on Euthamia.

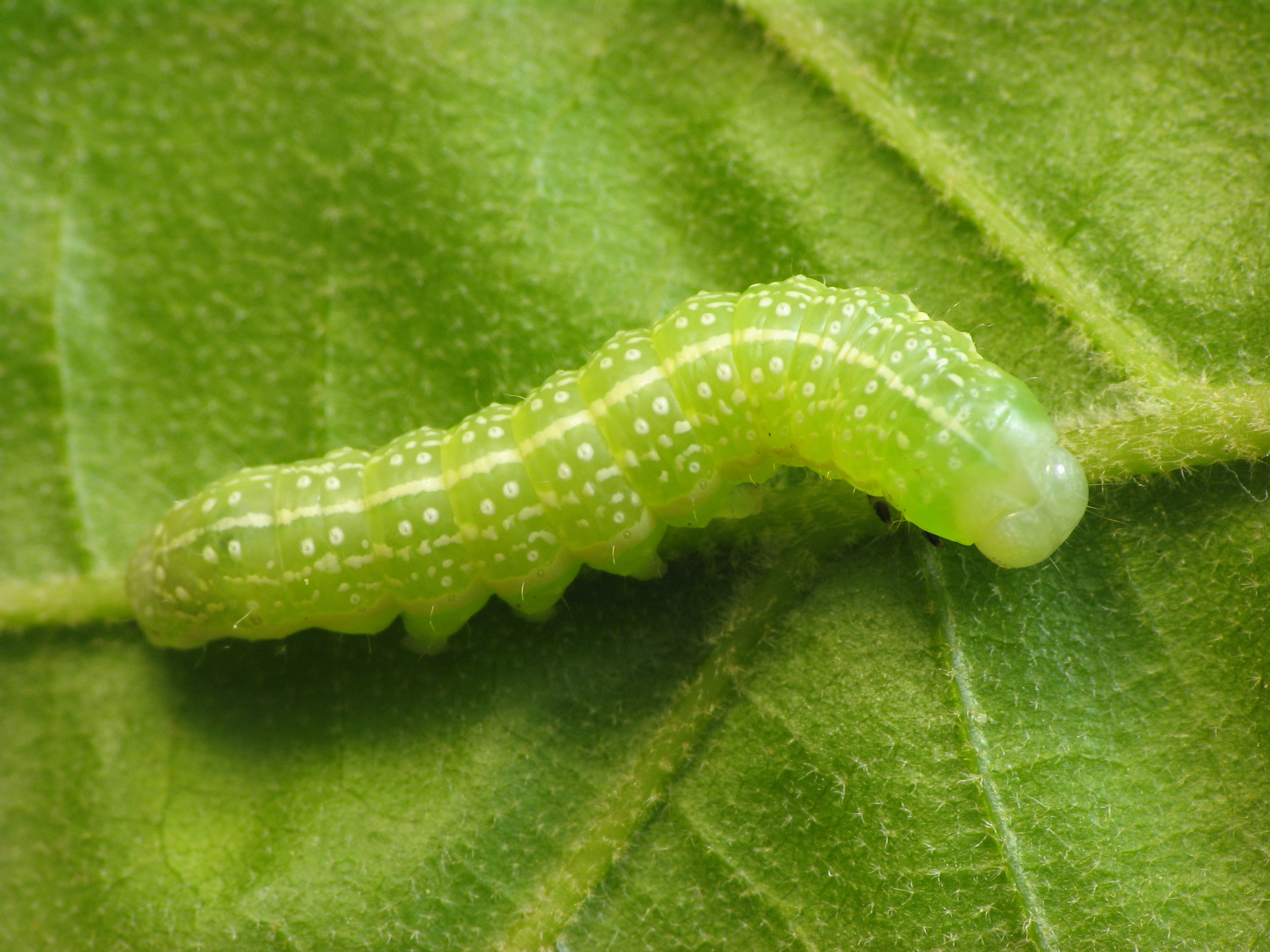
Lithophane antennata, caterpillar on oak leaf.

Cuculliinae is one of the larger subfamilies of moths in the family Noctuidae.

== Genera ==
- Adaphaenura
- Adita
- Agrochola
- Allophyes
- Altiplania
- Altipolia
- Amephana
- Anathix
- Andesia
- Andicola
- Antitype
- Antivaleria
- Apharetra
- Aporophyla
- Apostema
- Apsaphida
- Argyrana
- Atethmia
- Athaumasta
- Aumakua
- Austramathes
- Behrensia
- Blepharita
- Blepharosis
- Bombyciella
- Borsania
- Brachygalea
- Brachylomia
- Bryomima
- Bryopolia
- Caffristis
- Calliergis
- Calocea
- Calophasia
- Catasema
- Cerapoda
- Chaetaglaea
- Charierges
- Chopardiana
- Chubutiana
- Cleonymia
- Comodoria
- Compsotata
- Conistra
- Copanarta
- Copicucullia
- Copiphana
- Copitarsia
- Copitype
- Cotarsina
- Cteipolia
- Cucullia
- Cuculluna
- Daphoenura
- Daseochaeta
- Daseuplexia
- Dasyerges
- Dasypolia
- Dasysternum
- Dasythorax
- Desertullia
- Despumosia
- Dichonia
- Dichoniopsis
- Dryobota
- Dryobotodes
- Dryotype
- Ectochela
- Elwesia
- Epicausis
- Epidemas
- Epiglaea
- Episema
- Eremochlaena
- Eremopola
- Eucirroedia
- Eudaphaenura
- Eumichtis
- Eupsilia
- Euxoullia
- Evanina
- Fishia
- Fletcherea
- Galeana
- Gaurenopsis
- Grammoscelis
- Graptocullia
- Grisana
- Guntia
- Gyroprora
- Harpagophana
- Hemiglaea
- Hillia
- Himachalia
- Homoanarta
- Homoglaea
- Homohadena
- Homonacna
- Homoncocnemis
- Hoplotarsia
- Hyada
- Hyalobole
- Hypnotype
- Hypomecia
- Hypotype
- Hypsophila
- Isolasia
- Isopolia
- Jodia
- Klugeana
- Lamprosticta
- Lathosea
- Lepipolys
- Leucochlaena
- Leucocnemis
- Litholomia
- Lithomoia
- Lithophane
- Lithophasia
- Lomilysis
- Lophoterges
- Lycanades
- Meganephria
- Mendozania
- Mervia
- Mesorhynchaglaea
- Metacullia
- Metalopha
- Metaxaglaea
- Metlaouia
- Metopoceras
- Metopodicha
- Miracavira
- Neocucullia
- Neogalea
- Neperigea
- Neumichtis
- Neuquenioa
- Nycterophaeta
- Nyctycia
- Omia
- Omphalophana
- Omphaloscelis
- Oncocnemis
- Opsigalea
- Orthopha
- Ostheldera
- Oxycnemis
- Pachypolia
- Paracullia
- Parastichtis
- Parosmia
- Platypolia
- Pleromella
- Pleromelloida
- Policocnemis
- Polymixis
- Properigea
- Proseniella
- Provia
- Psectraglaea
- Pseudacontia
- Pseudanarta
- Pseudanthoecia
- Pseudobryomima
- Pseudocerura
- Pseudocopicucullia
- Pseudocopivaleria
- Pseudomecia
- Pyreferra
- Rancora
- Recoropha
- Rhatta
- Rhynchaglaea
- Riagria
- Rileyiana
- Scotochrosta
- Sericaglaea
- Shargacucullia
- Sirioba
- Speidelia
- Spudaea
- Stylopoda
- Sugitania
- Supralathosea
- Sutyna
- Sydiva
- Sympistis
- Taeniosea
- Tarsicopia
- Telorta
- Teratoglaea
- Thecamichtis
- Trichoridia
- Trigonophora
- Tunocaria
- Turanica
- Ulochlaena
- Valeria
- Valerietta
- Valeriodes
- Velazconia
- Xanthia
- Xylena
- Xylinissa
- Xylocampa
- Xylotype
- Xystopeplus
- Zutragum
