= Hypsophila =

Hypsophila is the scientific name of two genera of organisms and may refer to:

- Hypsophila (moth), a genus of insects in the family Noctuidae
- Hypsophila (plant), a genus of plants in the family Celastraceae
