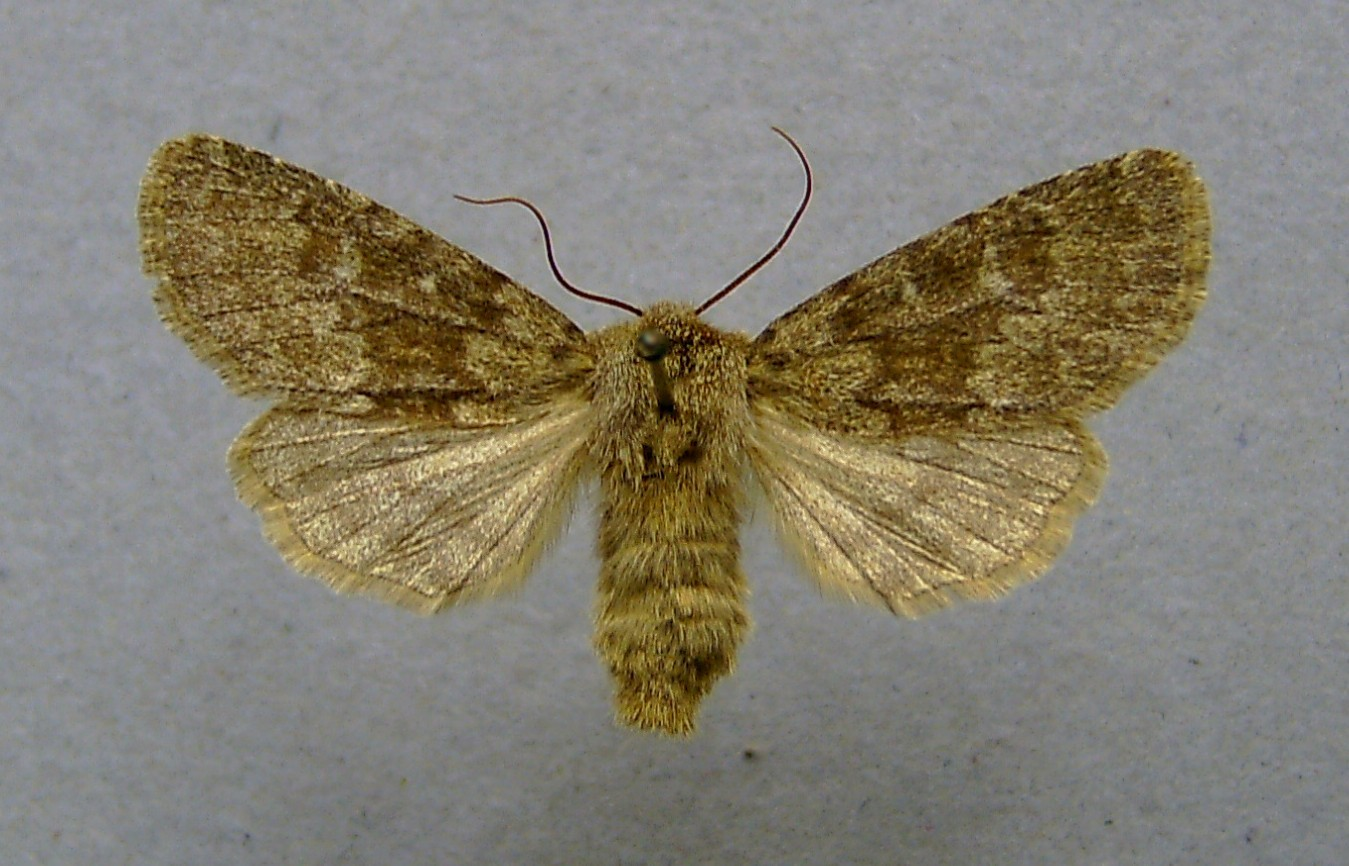
- Dasypolia templi

Scientific classification
- Kingdom: Animalia
- Phylum: Arthropoda
- Class: Insecta
- Order: Lepidoptera
- Superfamily: Noctuoidea
- Family: Noctuidae
- Subfamily: Cuculliinae
- Genus: Dasypolia; Guenée, 1852

Synonyms
- Cteipolia Staudinger, 1896; Hyada Moore, 1882; Dasythorax Staudinger, 1889; Anhausta Hampson, 1907; Tschetwerikovia Bundel, 1966; Dasymixis Ronkay & Varga, 1990; Subgenus Sinipolia (Dasypolia) Ronkay & Zilli, 1993; Auropolia Hreblay & Ronkay, 1999; Subgenus Tatsipolia (Dasypolia) Benedek, Behounek, Floriani & Saldaitis, 2011; Subgenus Chalapolia (Dasypolia) Benedek, Behounek, Floriani & Saldaitis, 2011; Subgenus Kitapolia (Dasypolia) Benedek, Behounek, Floriani & Saldaitis, 2011; Subgenus Yetipolia (Dasypolia) Benedek & Saldaitis, 2014; Subgenus Fumopolia (Dasypolia) Benedek & Saldaitis, 2014; Subgenus Zheduopolia (Dasypolia) Benedek & Saldaitis, 2014; Kapuria (Dasypolia) Benedek, Volynkin & Cernila, 2016

= Dasypolia =

Genus of moths

Dasypolia is a genus of moths of the family Noctuidae. The genus was erected by Achille Guenée in 1852.

== Species ==
- Dasypolia acrophila (Hampson, 1906)
- Dasypolia afghana Boursin, 1968
- Dasypolia akbar Boursin, 1967
- Dasypolia akkeregeshena Ronkay, Ronkay, Gyulai & Pekarsky, 2014 TL: West Kazakhstan, Akkeregeshen Plateau
- Dasypolia alpina (Draudt, 1950)
- Dasypolia altissima Hacker & Moberg, 1988
- Dasypolia anartinus (Püngeler, 1901)
- Dasypolia atrox Hacker & Peks, 1993
- Dasypolia bicolor Hreblay & Ronkay, 1995
- Dasypolia confusa Hreblay & Ronkay, 1995
- Dasypolia conistroides Hreblay & Ronkay, 1995
- Dasypolia delineata Hreblay & Ronkay, 1998
- Dasypolia diva Ronkay & Varga, 1990
- Dasypolia eberti Boursin, 1967
- Dasypolia echinata Hreblay & Ronkay, 1998
- Dasypolia episcopalis Boursin, 1967
- Dasypolia esseri Fibiger, 1993
- Dasypolia exprimata Staudinger, 1896
- Dasypolia fani Staudinger, 1892
- Dasypolia ferdinandi Rühl, 1892
- Dasypolia fibigeri Hacker & Moberg, 1988
- Dasypolia flavitincta Hreblay & Ronkay, 1995
- Dasypolia fraterna Bang-Haas, 1912
- Dasypolia fugitiva Hacker & Peks, 1993
- Dasypolia gerbillus Alphéraky, 1892
- Dasypolia gransoni Ronkay & Nekrasov, 1995
- Dasypolia grisea (Moore, 1882)
- Dasypolia honeyi Ronkay & Zilli, 1993
- Dasypolia informis (Walker, [1857])
- Dasypolia ipaykala Ronkay, Varga & Hreblay, 1998
- Dasypolia isotima (Püngeler, 1914)
- Dasypolia jumla Hreblay & Ronkay, 1999
- Dasypolia khangari Hreblay & Ronkay, 1999
- Dasypolia lama Staudinger, 1896
- Dasypolia leptographa Hreblay & Ronkay, 1995
- Dasypolia leta Hreblay & Ronkay, 1999
- Dasypolia leucocera (Hampson, 1894)
- Dasypolia lithophila (Kapur, 1962)
- Dasypolia magnifica Hacker & Peks, 1993
- Dasypolia melancholica Hacker & Peks, 1993
- Dasypolia mimetica Ronkay, 1995
- Dasypolia minuta Ronkay, Varga & Behounek 1992
- Dasypolia mitis Püngeler, 1906
- Dasypolia monogramma Hreblay & Ronkay, 1995
- Dasypolia monotona Gyulai & Ronkay, 1995
- Dasypolia nebulosa Ronkay & Varga, 1985
- Dasypolia nivalis Hreblay & Ronkay, 1995
- Dasypolia obsoleta Hreblay & Ronkay, 1995
- Dasypolia orogena Hreblay & Ronkay, 1995
- Dasypolia owadai Hreblay & Ronkay, 1998
- Dasypolia peksi Hacker, 1993
- Dasypolia picurka Hreblay & Ronkay, 1995
- Dasypolia polianus (Staudinger, 1889)
- Dasypolia psathyra Boursin, 1967
- Dasypolia puengeleri Hacker & Peks, 1993
- Dasypolia pygmaea Hreblay & Ronkay, 1995
- Dasypolia rasilis (Püngeler, 1900)
- Dasypolia rjabovi (Bundel, 1966)
- Dasypolia ronkaygabori Hreblay & Ronkay, 1999
- Dasypolia rufatrox Hreblay & Ronkay, 1995
- Dasypolia sacelli (Staudinger, 1896)
- Dasypolia sherpa Hreblay & Ronkay, 1999
- Dasypolia shugnana Varga, 1982
- Dasypolia simillima Hacker & Peks, 1993
- Dasypolia templi (Thunberg, 1792)
- Dasypolia tertia Ronkay & Nekrasov, 1995
- Dasypolia timoi Fibiger & K.Nupponen, 2006
- Dasypolia tinsangla Hreblay & Ronkay, 1999
- Dasypolia transcaucasica Ronkay & Varga, 1985
- Dasypolia tsheringi Hreblay & Ronkay, 1995
- Dasypolia unicata Hreblay & Ronkay, 1995
- Dasypolia tuektiensis Zolotarenko, 1993
- Dasypolia ursina Hreblay & Ronkay, 1995
- Dasypolia vargai Ronkay & Plante, 1992
- Dasypolia vera Ronkay & Szabóky, 1995
- Dasypolia vignai Ronkay & Zilli, 1993
- Dasypolia volynkini Ronkay, Ronkay, Gyulai & Pekarsky, 2014 TL: Kazakhstan, Sary-Su river
- Dasypolia yeti (Hacker & Peks, 1993)
- Dasypolia zolotuhini Ronkay, Ronkay, Gyulai & Pekarsky, 2014 TL: Uzbekistan, Prov. Tashkent, Chatkal Reserve
