= Omia =

Omia may refer to:

- Omia (moth), a genus of moth
- Omia District, Peru
- Online Mendelian Inheritance in Animals, an online database of animal phenotypes
- Omia, a minor Enochian angel
