= Caffristis =

Scientific classification
- Kingdom: Animalia
- Phylum: Arthropoda
- Class: Insecta
- Order: Lepidoptera
- Superfamily: Noctuoidea
- Family: Noctuidae
- Subfamily: Cuculliinae
- Genus: Caffristis; Hampson, 1906
- Species: C. ferrogrisea

Binomial name
- Caffristis ferrogrisea (Hampson, 1902)

Synonyms
- Heliophobus ferrogrisea Hampson, 1902

Genus of moths

Caffristis is a monotypic moth genus of the family Noctuidae. Its only species, Caffristis ferrogrisea, is found in South Africa. Both the genus and species was first described by George Hampson, the genus in 1906 and the species four years earlier in 1902.
