= Valerietta =

Scientific classification
- Domain: Eukaryota
- Kingdom: Animalia
- Phylum: Arthropoda
- Class: Insecta
- Order: Lepidoptera
- Superfamily: Noctuoidea
- Family: Noctuidae
- Subfamily: Cuculliinae
- Genus: Valerietta; Draudt, 1938

Genus of moths

Valerietta is a genus of moths of the family Noctuidae.

== Species ==
- Valerietta boursini de Freina & Hacker, 1985
- Valerietta bulgarica (Drenowski, 1953)
