= Argyrana =

Scientific classification
- Domain: Eukaryota
- Kingdom: Animalia
- Phylum: Arthropoda
- Class: Insecta
- Order: Lepidoptera
- Superfamily: Noctuoidea
- Family: Noctuidae
- Subfamily: Cuculliinae
- Genus: Argyrana; Köhler, 1952

Genus of moths

Argyrana is a genus of moths of the family Noctuidae. The genus was erected by Paul Köhler in 1952.

== Species ==
- Argyrana bimorpha Olivares & Angulo, 2010 Chile
- Argyrana excellens Köhler, 1952 Argentina (Chubut, Santa Cruz)
- Argyrana paulokehleri Olivares & Angulo, 2010 Chile
