= Catasema =

Scientific classification
- Domain: Eukaryota
- Kingdom: Animalia
- Phylum: Arthropoda
- Class: Insecta
- Order: Lepidoptera
- Superfamily: Noctuoidea
- Family: Noctuidae
- Subfamily: Cuculliinae
- Genus: Catasema; Staudinger, 1888
- Species: C. vulpina

Binomial name
- Catasema vulpina (Staudinger, 1888)

Synonyms
- Episema ? vulpina Staudinger, 1888

Genus of moths

Catasema is a monotypic moth genus of the family Noctuidae. Its only species, Catasema vulpina, is found in Uzbekistan. Both the genus and species were first described by Otto Staudinger in 1888.
