= Ostheldera =

Scientific classification
- Domain: Eukaryota
- Kingdom: Animalia
- Phylum: Arthropoda
- Class: Insecta
- Order: Lepidoptera
- Superfamily: Noctuoidea
- Family: Noctuidae
- Subfamily: Cuculliinae
- Genus: Ostheldera

Genus of moths

Ostheldera is a genus of moths of the family Noctuidae.

== Species ==
- Ostheldera arne L. Ronkay & Z. Varga, 1994
- Ostheldera minna L. Ronkay & Z. Varga, 1994
- Ostheldera persa L. Ronkay & Z. Varga, 1994
