= Andesia =

Scientific classification
- Kingdom: Animalia
- Phylum: Arthropoda
- Class: Insecta
- Order: Lepidoptera
- Superfamily: Noctuoidea
- Family: Noctuidae
- Subfamily: Cuculliinae
- Genus: Andesia; Hampson, 1906

Genus of moths

Andesia is a genus of moths of the family Noctuidae. The genus was erected by George Hampson in 1906.

== Species ==
- Andesia apicalis (Köhler, 1979) Chile, Argentina
- Andesia barilochensis Angulo & de Bros, 1996 Chile
- Andesia differens (Köhler, 1951) Chile, Argentina
- Andesia lesa (Köhler, 1979) Chile
- Andesia oenistis Hampson, 1906 Argentina (Mendoza)
- Andesia pseudoleucanides Olivares, Angulo & Moreno, 2009 Chile
