= Adaphaenura =

Scientific classification
- Domain: Eukaryota
- Kingdom: Animalia
- Phylum: Arthropoda
- Class: Insecta
- Order: Lepidoptera
- Superfamily: Noctuoidea
- Family: Noctuidae
- Subfamily: Cuculliinae
- Genus: Adaphaenura; Hampson, 1905

Genus of moths

Adaphaenura is a genus of moths of the family Noctuidae. The genus was erected by George Hampson in 1905.

== Species ==
- Adaphaenura minuscula (Butler, 1882) Madagascar
- Adaphaenura ratovosoni Viette, 1973 Madagascar
