= Apostema =

Scientific classification
- Kingdom: Animalia
- Phylum: Arthropoda
- Class: Insecta
- Order: Lepidoptera
- Superfamily: Noctuoidea
- Family: Noctuidae
- Subfamily: Cuculliinae
- Genus: Apostema; Warren in Seitz, 1913

Genus of moths

Apostema is a genus of moths of the family Noctuidae. The genus was described by Warren in 1913.

== Species ==
- Apostema citrina Hreblay & Ronkay, 1998 Nepal
- Apostema distigmata (Hampson, 1906) Punjab
