= Copitarsia =

Scientific classification
- Kingdom: Animalia
- Phylum: Arthropoda
- Class: Insecta
- Order: Lepidoptera
- Superfamily: Noctuoidea
- Family: Noctuidae
- Subfamily: Cuculliinae
- Genus: Copitarsia; Hampson, 1906

Synonyms
- Psectrotarsia (Acronyctinae) Hampson, 1908; Psectrotarsia (Acronyctinae) Hampson, 1910; Allorhodoecia Brèthes, 1923; Cotarsina Köhler, 1952

Genus of moths

Copitarsia is a genus of moths of the family Noctuidae. The genus was erected by George Hampson in 1906.

== Species ==
- Copitarsia anatunca Angulo & Olivares, 1999 Chile
- Copitarsia anguloi Castillo, 1991 Chile
- Copitarsia basilinea Köhler, 1958 Argentina (Mendoza), Chile
- Copitarsia belensis (Köhler, 1973) Argentina
- Copitarsia clavata (Köhler, 1952) Argentina (Chubut)
- Copitarsia consueta (Walker, 1857)
- Copitarsia corruda Pogue & Simmons, 2008 Peru
- Copitarsia decolora (Guenée, 1852) Mexico, Guatemala, Costa Rica, Venezuela, Colombia, Ecuador, Argentina, Chile
- Copitarsia fleissiana (Köhler, 1958) Argentina (Neuquen)
- Copitarsia fuscirena (Hampson, 1910) Argentina (Mendoza)
- Copitarsia gentiliana (Köhler, 1961) Argentina (Neuquen)
- Copitarsia gibberosa Pogue, 2014 Chile, Argentina (Neuquen, Rio Negro)
- Copitarsia gracilis (Köhler, 1961) Argentina
- Copitarsia heydenreichii (Freyer, [1850])
- Copitarsia humilis (Blanchard, 1852) Chile
- Copitarsia incommoda (Walker, 1865) Colombia, Peru, Costa Rica, Argentina
- Copitarsia lacustre Angulo & Olivares, 2009 Chile
- Copitarsia maxima (Köhler, 1961) Argentina (Neuquen)
- Copitarsia mimica Angulo & Olivares, 1999 southern Argentina
- Copitarsia murina Angulo, Olivares & Badilla, 2001 Chile
- Copitarsia naenioides (Butler, 1882) Chile, Argentina
- Copitarsia patagonica Hampson, 1906 Patagonia
- Copitarsia purilinea (Mabille, 1885) Patagonia
- Copitarsia roseofulva (Köhler, 1952) Bolivia, Chile
- Copitarsia sulfurea (Köhler, 1973) Argentina (Neuquen)
- Copitarsia tamsi (Giacomelli, 1922) Argentina
- Copitarsia turbata (Herrich-Schäffer, [1852])
- Copitarsia vivax (Köhler, 1952) Argentina (Chubut)
