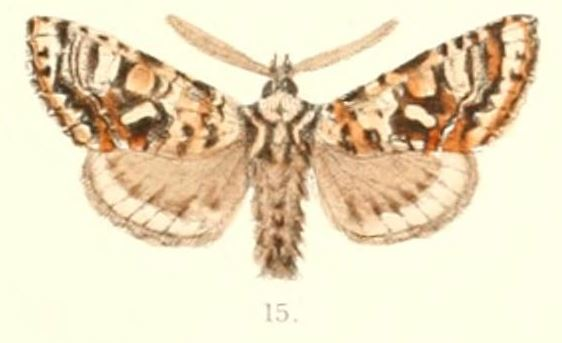
- Valeriodes heterocampa

Scientific classification
- Domain: Eukaryota
- Kingdom: Animalia
- Phylum: Arthropoda
- Class: Insecta
- Order: Lepidoptera
- Superfamily: Noctuoidea
- Family: Noctuidae
- Subfamily: Cuculliinae
- Genus: Valeriodes; Warren in Seitz, 1913

= Valeriodes =

Genus of moths

Valeriodes is a genus of moths of the family Noctuidae.

== Species ==
- Valeriodes cyanelinea (Hampson, 1894)
- Valeriodes heterocampa (Moore, 1882)
- Valeriodes icamba (Swinhoe, 1893)
- Valeriodes viridinigra (Hampson, 1896)
