= Andicola =

- Andicola huallatani

Scientific classification
- Domain: Eukaryota
- Kingdom: Animalia
- Phylum: Arthropoda
- Class: Insecta
- Order: Lepidoptera
- Superfamily: Noctuoidea
- Family: Noctuidae
- Subfamily: Cuculliinae
- Genus: Andicola; Staudinger, 1894
- Species: A. huallatani

Binomial name
- Andicola huallatani Staudinger, 1894

Genus of moths

Andicola is a monotypic moth genus of the family Noctuidae. Its only species, Andicola huallatani, is found in Bolivia. Both the genus and species were first described by Staudinger in 1894.
