= Galeana (moth) =

Scientific classification
- Domain: Eukaryota
- Kingdom: Animalia
- Phylum: Arthropoda
- Class: Insecta
- Order: Lepidoptera
- Superfamily: Noctuoidea
- Family: Noctuidae
- Subfamily: Cuculliinae
- Genus: Galeana; Köhler, 1952

Genus of moths

Galeana is a genus of moths of the family Noctuidae.

== Species ==
- Galeana basilinea
- Galeana midas
