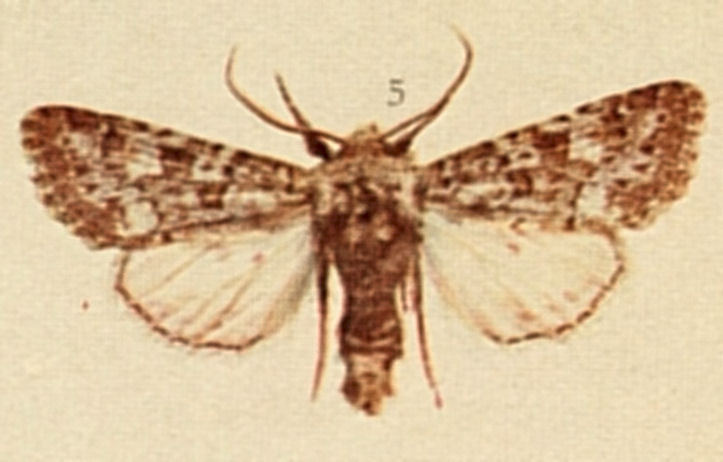
- Polymixis lichenea

Scientific classification
- Domain: Eukaryota
- Kingdom: Animalia
- Phylum: Arthropoda
- Class: Insecta
- Order: Lepidoptera
- Superfamily: Noctuoidea
- Family: Noctuidae
- Subfamily: Cuculliinae
- Genus: Eumichtis

= Eumichtis =

Subgenus of moths

Eumichtis is a subgenus of moths of the genus Polymixis, and the family Noctuidae.
