= Desertullia =

Scientific classification
- Domain: Eukaryota
- Kingdom: Animalia
- Phylum: Arthropoda
- Class: Insecta
- Order: Lepidoptera
- Superfamily: Noctuoidea
- Family: Noctuidae
- Subfamily: Cuculliinae
- Genus: Desertullia; Köhler, 1952
- Species: D. argyrofulva

Binomial name
- Desertullia argyrofulva Köhler, 1952

Genus of moths

Desertullia is a monotypic moth genus of the family Noctuidae. Its only species, Desertullia argyrofulva, is found in the Argentine provinces of Chubut and Mendoza. Both the genus and species were first described by Paul Köhler in 1952.
