= Spudaea =

Scientific classification
- Kingdom: Animalia
- Phylum: Arthropoda
- Class: Insecta
- Order: Lepidoptera
- Superfamily: Noctuoidea
- Family: Noctuidae
- Subfamily: Cuculliinae
- Genus: Spudaea; Snellen, 1867

Genus of moths

Spudaea is a genus of moths of the family Noctuidae.

== Species ==
- Spudaea eucrinita (Turati, 1933)
- Spudaea pontica Kljutschko, 1968
- Spudaea ruticilla (Esper, 1791)
