= Altipolia =

Scientific classification
- Domain: Eukaryota
- Kingdom: Animalia
- Phylum: Arthropoda
- Class: Insecta
- Order: Lepidoptera
- Superfamily: Noctuoidea
- Family: Noctuidae
- Subfamily: Cuculliinae
- Genus: Altipolia; Plante, 1985

Genus of moths

Altipolia is a genus of moths of the family Noctuidae. The genus was erected by Jacques Plante in 1985.

== Species ==
- Altipolia illecebrosa (Püngeler, 1906) Nepal, Qinghai, Sichuan
- Altipolia sonamargensis Plante, 1985 Kashmir
- Altipolia gengda Benedek & Saldaitis, 2014 Sichuan
- Altipolia plantei Hacker & Peks, 1993 Nepal, India (Himachal Pradesh)
- Altipolia purpurea Plante, 1985 Nepal
- Altipolia griseana Hreblay & Plante, 1995 Nepal
- Altipolia ganeshgurungi Hreblay & Ronkay, 1998 Nepal
