= Metopodicha =

Scientific classification
- Domain: Eukaryota
- Kingdom: Animalia
- Phylum: Arthropoda
- Class: Insecta
- Order: Lepidoptera
- Superfamily: Noctuoidea
- Family: Noctuidae
- Subfamily: Cuculliinae
- Genus: Metopodicha; Draudt, 1936

Genus of moths

Metopodicha is a genus of moths of the family Noctuidae.

== Species ==
- Metopodicha antherici (Christoph, 1884)
- Metopodicha ernesti Draudt, 1936
- Metopodicha longicornis Boursin, 1957
