= Calocea =

Scientific classification
- Kingdom: Animalia
- Phylum: Arthropoda
- Class: Insecta
- Order: Lepidoptera
- Superfamily: Noctuoidea
- Family: Noctuidae
- Subfamily: Cuculliinae
- Genus: Calocea; Dyar, 1914
- Species: C. eucraspedica

Binomial name
- Calocea eucraspedica Dyar, 1914

Genus and species of moth

Calocea is a monotypic moth genus of the family Noctuidae. Its only species, Calocea eucraspedica, is found in Mexico. Both the genus and species were first described by Harrison Gray Dyar Jr. in 1914.
