= Pseudacontia =

Scientific classification
- Domain: Eukaryota
- Kingdom: Animalia
- Phylum: Arthropoda
- Class: Insecta
- Order: Lepidoptera
- Superfamily: Noctuoidea
- Family: Noctuidae
- Subfamily: Cuculliinae
- Genus: Pseudacontia; J. B. Smith, 1883

Genus of moths

Pseudacontia is a genus of moths of the family Noctuidae.

== Species ==
- Pseudacontia cansa J.B. Smith, 1908
- Pseudacontia crustaria (Morrison, 1875)
- Pseudacontia louisa J.B. Smith, 1908
