= Altiplania =

Scientific classification
- Domain: Eukaryota
- Kingdom: Animalia
- Phylum: Arthropoda
- Class: Insecta
- Order: Lepidoptera
- Superfamily: Noctuoidea
- Family: Noctuidae
- Subfamily: Cuculliinae
- Genus: Altiplania; Köhler, 1979

Genus of moths

Altiplania is a genus of moths of the family Noctuidae. The genus was erected by Paul Köhler in 1979.

== Species ==
- Altiplania inornata Köhler, 1979 Argentina (Mendoza)
- Altiplania frayjorgensis Olivares & Angulo, 2015 Chile
- Altiplania luetscheri Köhler, 1979 Argentina (Mendoza)
- Altiplania maculata Köhler, 1979 Argentina (Mendoza)
- Altiplania pizarroi Angulo & Olivares, 2005 Chile
