= Elwesia =

Scientific classification
- Kingdom: Animalia
- Phylum: Arthropoda
- Class: Insecta
- Order: Lepidoptera
- Superfamily: Noctuoidea
- Family: Noctuidae
- Subfamily: Cuculliinae
- Genus: Elwesia; Hampson, 1894

Genus of moths

Elwesia is a genus of moths of the family Noctuidae.

== Species ==
- Elwesia diplostigma Hampson, 1894
- Elwesia nigripalpis Warren, 1911
- Elwesia pallida Warren, 1911
