= Blepharosis =

Scientific classification
- Domain: Eukaryota
- Kingdom: Animalia
- Phylum: Arthropoda
- Class: Insecta
- Order: Lepidoptera
- Superfamily: Noctuoidea
- Family: Noctuidae
- Subfamily: Cuculliinae
- Genus: Blepharosis; Boursin, 1964

Genus of moths

Blepharosis is a genus of moths of the family Noctuidae.

== Species ==
- Blepharosis anachoretoides (Alphéraky, 1892)
- Blepharosis bryocharis Boursin, 1964
- Blepharosis dianthoecina (Staudinger, 1895)
- Blepharosis griseirufa (Hampson, 1894)
- Blepharosis illecebrosa (Püngeler, 1906)
- Blepharosis lama (Püngeler, 1900)
- Blepharosis paspa (Püngeler, 1900)
- Blepharosis poecila (Draudt, 1950)
- Blepharosis retracta (Draudt, 1950)
- Blepharosis retrahens (Draudt, 1950)
- Blepharosis smaragdistis (Draudt, 1950)
- Blepharosis sublimbatus (Püngeler, 1899)
- Blepharosis sumbarginata (Bang-Haas 1927)
