= Recoropha =

Scientific classification
- Kingdom: Animalia
- Phylum: Arthropoda
- Class: Insecta
- Order: Lepidoptera
- Superfamily: Noctuoidea
- Family: Noctuidae
- Subfamily: Cuculliinae
- Genus: Recoropha; Nye, 1975

Genus of moths

Recoropha is a genus of moths of the family Noctuidae.

== Species ==
- Recoropha canteneri (Duponchel, 1833)
