= Charierges =

Scientific classification
- Kingdom: Animalia
- Phylum: Arthropoda
- Class: Insecta
- Order: Lepidoptera
- Superfamily: Noctuoidea
- Family: Noctuidae
- Subfamily: Cuculliinae
- Genus: Charierges; Draudt, 1950

Genus of moths

Charierges is a genus of moths of the family Noctuidae. The genus was erected by Max Wilhelm Karl Draudt in 1950. Both species are found in Yunnan, China.

== Species ==
- Charierges nigralba Draudt, 1950
- Charierges brunneomedia Draudt, 1950
