= Tunocaria =

Scientific classification
- Kingdom: Animalia
- Phylum: Arthropoda
- Clade: Pancrustacea
- Class: Insecta
- Order: Lepidoptera
- Superfamily: Noctuoidea
- Family: Noctuidae
- Subfamily: Cuculliinae
- Genus: Tunocaria
- Species: T. rubiginosa

Binomial name
- Tunocaria rubiginosa Viette, 1961

Genus of moths

Tunocaria is a genus of moths of the family Noctuidae. There is only one species in this genus, Tunocaria rubiginosa, that is known from Madagascar.
