= Despumosia =

Scientific classification
- Domain: Eukaryota
- Kingdom: Animalia
- Phylum: Arthropoda
- Class: Insecta
- Order: Lepidoptera
- Superfamily: Noctuoidea
- Family: Noctuidae
- Subfamily: Cuculliinae
- Genus: Despumosia; Nye, 1975
- Species: D. rubescens

Binomial name
- Despumosia rubescens (Köhler, 1952)

Synonyms
- Generic: Pseudosmia Köhler, 1952; Specific: Pseudosmia rubescens Köhler, 1952

Genus of moths

Despumosia is a monotypic moth genus of the family Noctuidae described by Nye in 1975. Its only species, Despumosia rubescens, was first described by Paul Köhler in 1952. It is found in Argentina's Chubut Province.
