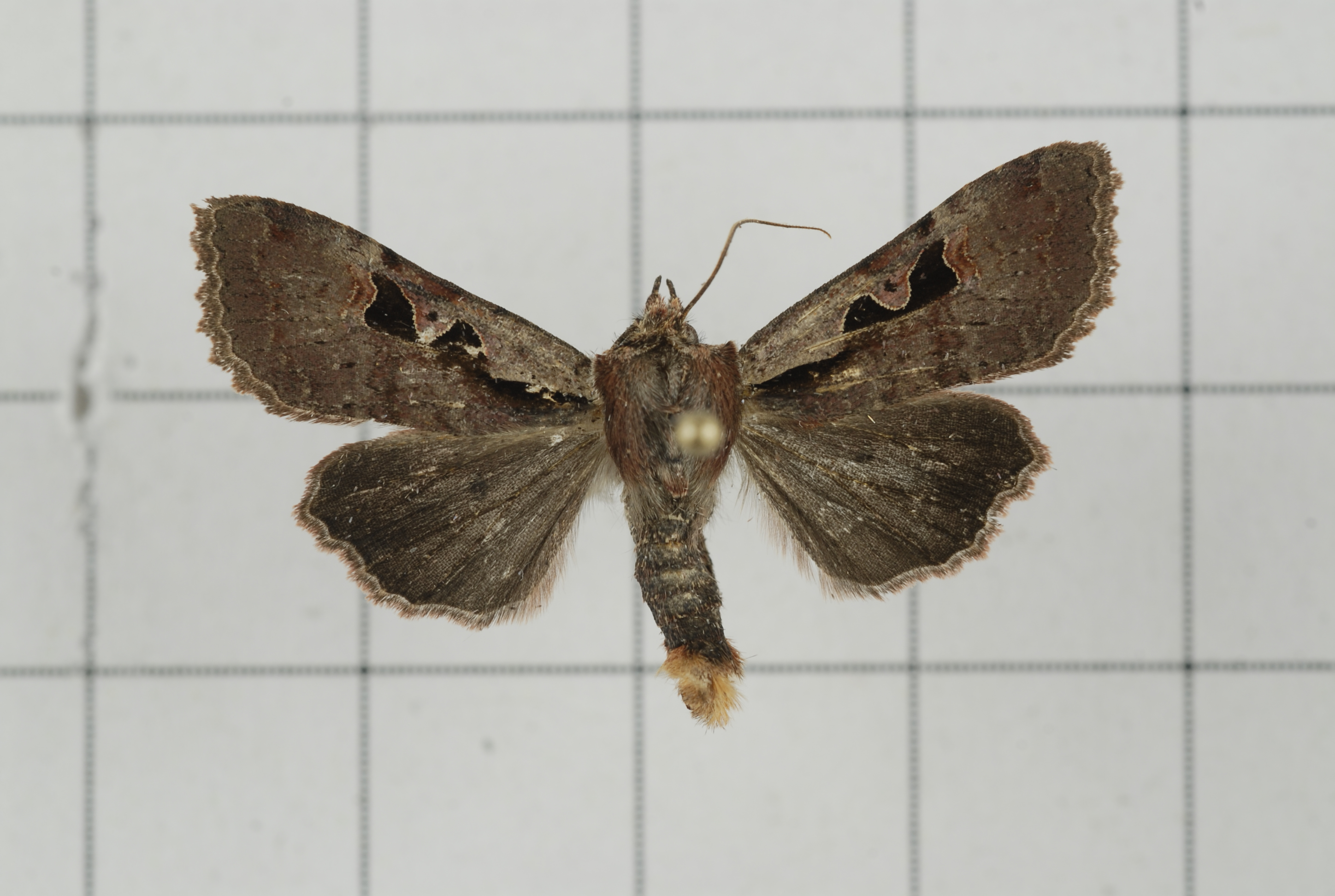

Scientific classification
- Kingdom: Animalia
- Phylum: Arthropoda
- Clade: Pancrustacea
- Class: Insecta
- Order: Lepidoptera
- Superfamily: Noctuoidea
- Family: Noctuidae
- Subfamily: Cuculliinae
- Genus: Sugitania; Matsumura, 1926

= Sugitania =

Genus of moths

Sugitania is a genus of moths of the family Noctuidae.

== Species ==
- Sugitania lepida (Butler, 1879)
