= Turanica =

Scientific classification
- Domain: Eukaryota
- Kingdom: Animalia
- Phylum: Arthropoda
- Class: Insecta
- Order: Lepidoptera
- Superfamily: Noctuoidea
- Family: Noctuidae
- Subfamily: Cuculliinae
- Genus: Turanica; Boursin, 1963

Genus of moths

Turanica is a genus of moths of the family Noctuidae.

== Species ==
- Turanica haeretica (Püngeler, 1902)
