= Bryopolia =

Scientific classification
- Domain: Eukaryota
- Kingdom: Animalia
- Phylum: Arthropoda
- Class: Insecta
- Order: Lepidoptera
- Superfamily: Noctuoidea
- Family: Noctuidae
- Subfamily: Cuculliinae
- Genus: Bryopolia; Boursin, 1954

Genus of moths

Bryopolia is a genus of moths of the family Noctuidae. The genus was erected by Charles Boursin in 1954.

== Species ==
- Bryopolia bryoxenoides Gyulai & Varga, 1998 Kyrgyzstan
- Bryopolia boursini Plante, 1983 Afghanistan
- Bryopolia chamaeleon (Alphéraky, 1887) Turkestan
- Bryopolia chrysospora Boursin, 1954 Turkestan
- Bryopolia holosericea Boursin, 1960 Afghanistan
- Bryopolia monotona Varga, Ronkay & Hacker, 1990 Afghanistan
- Bryopolia orophasma Boursin, 1960 Afghanistan
- Bryopolia ronkayorum Hacker & Kautt, 1996
- Bryopolia tenuicornis (Alphéraky, 1887) Turkestan
- Bryopolia thomasi Varga, Ronkay & Hacker, 1990 Ladakh, Pakistan
- Bryopolia tsvetaevi Varga & Ronkay, 1990 Afghanistan, Pamir
- Bryopolia tribulis Plante, 1983 Afghanistan
- Bryopolia virescens (Hampson, 1894) Kashmir
