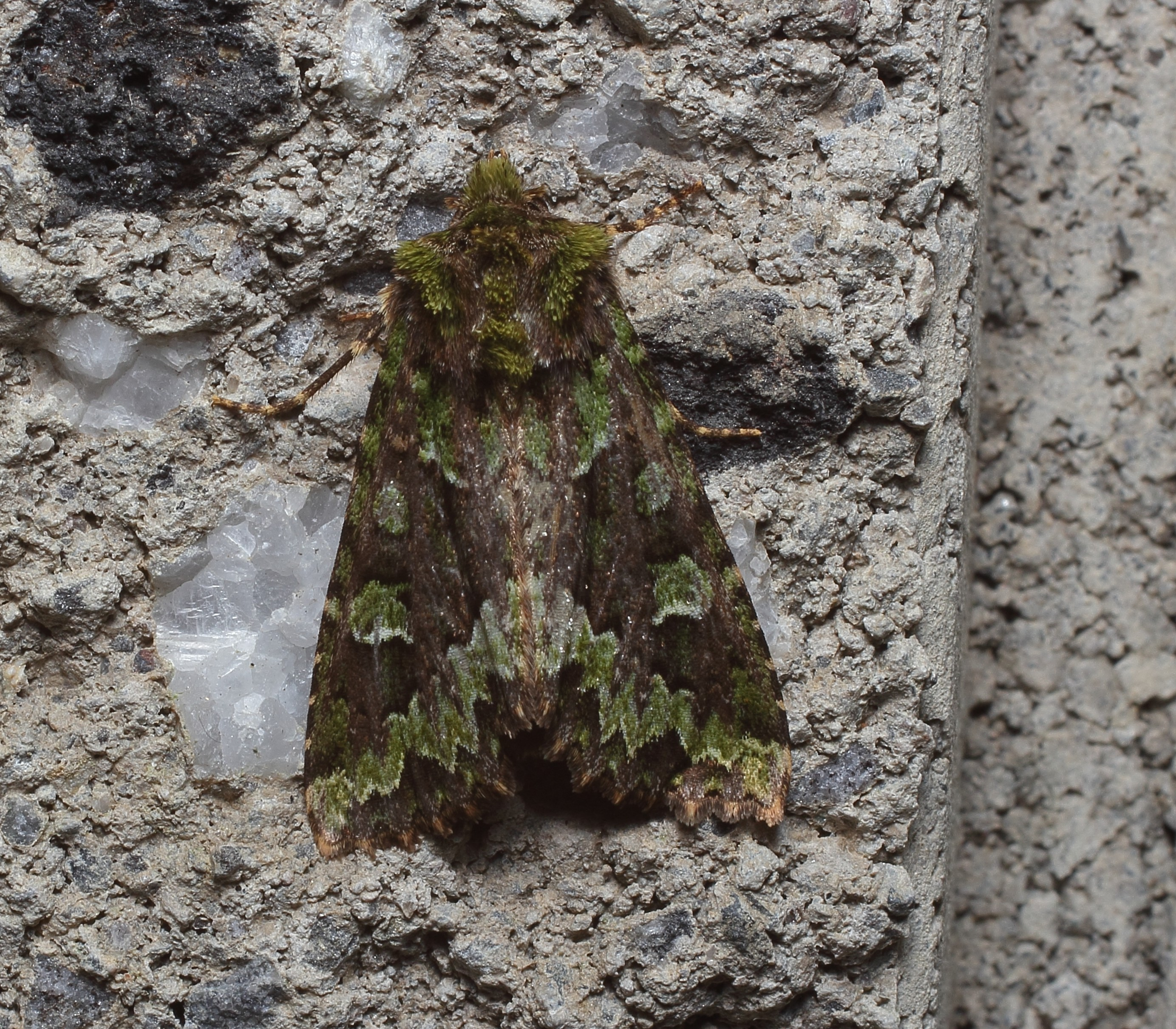
- Antivaleria viridimacula

Scientific classification
- Kingdom: Animalia
- Phylum: Arthropoda
- Clade: Pancrustacea
- Class: Insecta
- Order: Lepidoptera
- Superfamily: Noctuoidea
- Family: Noctuidae
- Subfamily: Cuculliinae
- Genus: Antivaleria; Sugi, 1958

= Antivaleria =

Genus of moths

Antivaleria is a genus of moths of the family Noctuidae. The genus was erected by Shigero Sugi in 1958.

== Species ==
- Antivaleria viridimacula (Graeser, 1889) south-eastern Siberia, Kurile Islands, Japan
- Antivaleria munda (Leech, 1900) western China
- Antivaleria viridentata Hreblay & Ronkay, 1997 Taiwan
- Antivaleria peregovitsi Ronkay, Ronkay, Gyulai & Hacker, 2010
- Antivaleria ronkayorum Zhang & Wang, 2024
