= Chubutiana =

Scientific classification
- Domain: Eukaryota
- Kingdom: Animalia
- Phylum: Arthropoda
- Class: Insecta
- Order: Lepidoptera
- Superfamily: Noctuoidea
- Family: Noctuidae
- Subfamily: Cuculliinae
- Genus: Chubutiana; Köhler, 1952
- Species: C. nigripes

Binomial name
- Chubutiana nigripes Köhler, 1952

Genus of moths

Chubutiana is a monotypic moth genus of the family Noctuidae. Its only species, Chubutiana nigripes, is found in Chubut Province of Argentina. Both the genus and species were first described by Paul Köhler in 1952.
