= Teratoglaea =

Scientific classification
- Kingdom: Animalia
- Phylum: Arthropoda
- Clade: Pancrustacea
- Class: Insecta
- Order: Lepidoptera
- Superfamily: Noctuoidea
- Family: Noctuidae
- Subfamily: Cuculliinae
- Genus: Teratoglaea; Sugi, 1958

Genus of moths

Teratoglaea is a genus of moths of the family Noctuidae.

== Species ==
- Teratoglaea pacifica Sugi, 1958
