= Borsania =

Scientific classification
- Domain: Eukaryota
- Kingdom: Animalia
- Phylum: Arthropoda
- Class: Insecta
- Order: Lepidoptera
- Superfamily: Noctuoidea
- Family: Noctuidae
- Subfamily: Cuculliinae
- Genus: Borsania; Köhler, 1952
- Species: B. mendozina

Binomial name
- Borsania mendozina Köhler, 1952

Genus and species of moth

Borsania is a monotypic moth genus of the family Noctuidae. Its only species, Borsania mendozina, is found in Mendoza Province, Argentina. Both the genus and species were first described by Paul Köhler in 1952.
