= Cuculluna =

Scientific classification
- Domain: Eukaryota
- Kingdom: Animalia
- Phylum: Arthropoda
- Class: Insecta
- Order: Lepidoptera
- Superfamily: Noctuoidea
- Family: Noctuidae
- Subfamily: Cuculliinae
- Genus: Cuculluna; Köhler, 1952

Genus of moths

Cuculluna is a genus of moths of the family Noctuidae. The genus was erected by Paul Köhler in 1952. Both species are known from La Rioja Province, Argentina.

== Species ==
- Cuculluna cristagalli Köhler, 1952
- Cuculluna haywardi Köhler, 1979
