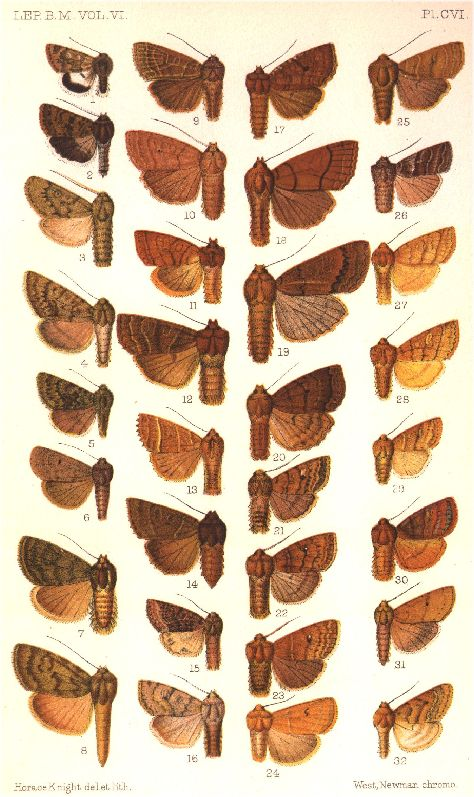

Scientific classification
- Kingdom: Animalia
- Phylum: Arthropoda
- Class: Insecta
- Order: Lepidoptera
- Superfamily: Noctuoidea
- Family: Noctuidae
- Subfamily: Cuculliinae
- Genus: Psectraglaea; Hampson, 1906
- Species: P. carnosa

Binomial name
- Psectraglaea carnosa (Grote, 1877)

= Psectraglaea =

Genus of moths

Psectraglaea is a monotypic moth genus of the family Noctuidae described by George Hampson in 1906. Its only species, Psectraglaea carnosa, the pink sallow, described by Augustus Radcliffe Grote in 1877, is native to North America. It is listed as threatened in Connecticut, and as a species of special concern in Massachusetts.

The larval host plant has not been conclusively documented, but it is likely Vaccinium angustifolium.
