= Comodoria =

Scientific classification
- Domain: Eukaryota
- Kingdom: Animalia
- Phylum: Arthropoda
- Class: Insecta
- Order: Lepidoptera
- Superfamily: Noctuoidea
- Family: Noctuidae
- Subfamily: Cuculliinae
- Genus: Comodoria; Köhler, 1952
- Species: C. splendida

Binomial name
- Comodoria splendida Köhler, 1952

Genus of moths

Comodoria is a monotypic moth genus of the family Noctuidae. Its only species, Comodoria splendida, is found in Chubut Province of Argentina. Both the genus and species were first described by Paul Köhler in 1952.
