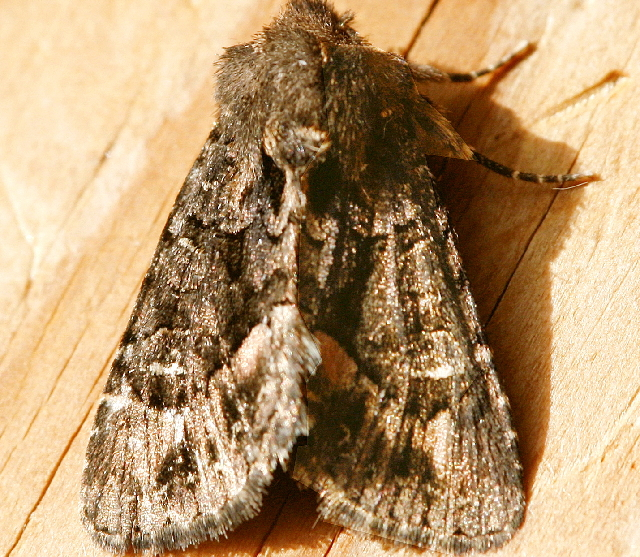

Scientific classification
- Kingdom: Animalia
- Phylum: Arthropoda
- Class: Insecta
- Order: Lepidoptera
- Superfamily: Noctuoidea
- Family: Noctuidae
- Subfamily: Cuculliinae
- Genus: Dryotype; Hampson, 1906

= Dryotype =

Genus of moths

Dryotype is a genus of moths of the family Noctuidae.

== Species ==
- Dryotype opina (Grote, 1878)
