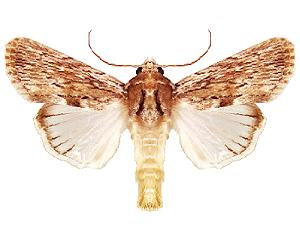

Scientific classification
- Kingdom: Animalia
- Phylum: Arthropoda
- Class: Insecta
- Order: Lepidoptera
- Superfamily: Noctuoidea
- Family: Noctuidae
- Subfamily: Cuculliinae
- Genus: Neogalea; Hampson, 1906
- Species: N. sunia

Binomial name
- Neogalea sunia Guenée, 1852

Synonyms
- Xylopmyges sunia; Xylina esula Druce, 1889; Neogalea braziliensis

= Neogalea =

Genus of moths

Neogalea sunia, the catabena moth or lantana stick moth, is a moth of the family Noctuidae, and the only species in the genus Neogalea. It is found from the southern United States, through the Caribbean (including Guadeloupe and Martinique) to Argentina. Furthermore, it has been introduced in Australia, on Norfolk Island in 1962. Since that time it has increased its range and is now common in Queensland and northern New South Wales. It has also been introduced on Hawaii.

The wingspan is about 33 mm.

The larva feeds on Lantana species.
