= Homonacna =

Scientific classification
- Domain: Eukaryota
- Kingdom: Animalia
- Phylum: Arthropoda
- Class: Insecta
- Order: Lepidoptera
- Superfamily: Noctuoidea
- Family: Noctuidae
- Subfamily: Cuculliinae
- Genus: Homonacna; D. S. Fletcher, 1961

Type species
- Homonacna alpnista D. S. Fletcher, 1961

Synonyms
- Chopardiana Viette, 1963

Genus of moths

Homonacna is a genus of moths of the family Noctuidae described by David Stephen Fletcher in 1961.

Species of this genus are:

- Homonacna alpnista D. S. Fletcher, 1961
- Homonacna cadoreli (Viette, 1968)
- Homonacna duberneti (Viette, 1968)
- Homonacna zebrina (Viette, 1968)
