= Trichoridia =

Scientific classification
- Kingdom: Animalia
- Phylum: Arthropoda
- Class: Insecta
- Order: Lepidoptera
- Superfamily: Noctuoidea
- Family: Noctuidae
- Subfamily: Cuculliinae
- Genus: Trichoridia; Hampson, 1906

Genus of moths

Trichoridia is a genus of moths of the family Noctuidae.

== Species ==
- Trichoridia albiluna Hampson, 1906
- Trichoridia canosparsa (Hampson, 1894)
- Trichoridia cuprescens Hampson, 1906
- Trichoridia dentata (Hampson, 1894)
- Trichoridia endroma (Swinhoe, 1893)
- Trichoridia eristicum (Püngeler, 1906)
- Trichoridia fulminea (Leech, 1900)
- Trichoridia hampsoni (Leech, 1900)
- Trichoridia herchatera (Swinhoe, 1893)
- Trichoridia junctura (Hampson, 1894)
- Trichoridia leuconephra Draudt, 1950
- Trichoridia sikkimensis (Moore, 1881)
