= Compsotata =

Scientific classification
- Kingdom: Animalia
- Phylum: Arthropoda
- Clade: Pancrustacea
- Class: Insecta
- Order: Lepidoptera
- Superfamily: Noctuoidea
- Family: Noctuidae
- Subfamily: Cuculliinae
- Genus: Compsotata; Prout, 1907

Synonyms
- Charidea Guenee, 1852; Timaea Saalmüller, 1891

Genus of moths

Compsotata is a genus of moths of the family Noctuidae. The genus was erected by Louis Beethoven Prout in 1907.

== Species ==
- Compsotata corneliae Behounek & Beck, 2012 Ethiopia
- Compsotata elegantissima (Guenée, 1852) Zaire, Kenya, Mozambique, Zimbabwe, South Africa
- Compsotata janmoullei (Kiriakoff, 1954) Zaire
