= Dasyerges =

Scientific classification
- Domain: Eukaryota
- Kingdom: Animalia
- Phylum: Arthropoda
- Class: Insecta
- Order: Lepidoptera
- Superfamily: Noctuoidea
- Family: Noctuidae
- Subfamily: Cuculliinae
- Genus: Dasyerges; Draudt, 1950

Genus of moths

Dasyerges is a genus of moths of the family Noctuidae. The genus was erected by Max Wilhelm Karl Draudt in 1950.

== Species ==
- Dasyerges perseverans Hreblay & Ronkay, 1998 Nepal
- Dasyerges poliastis Draudt, 1950 Yunnan
