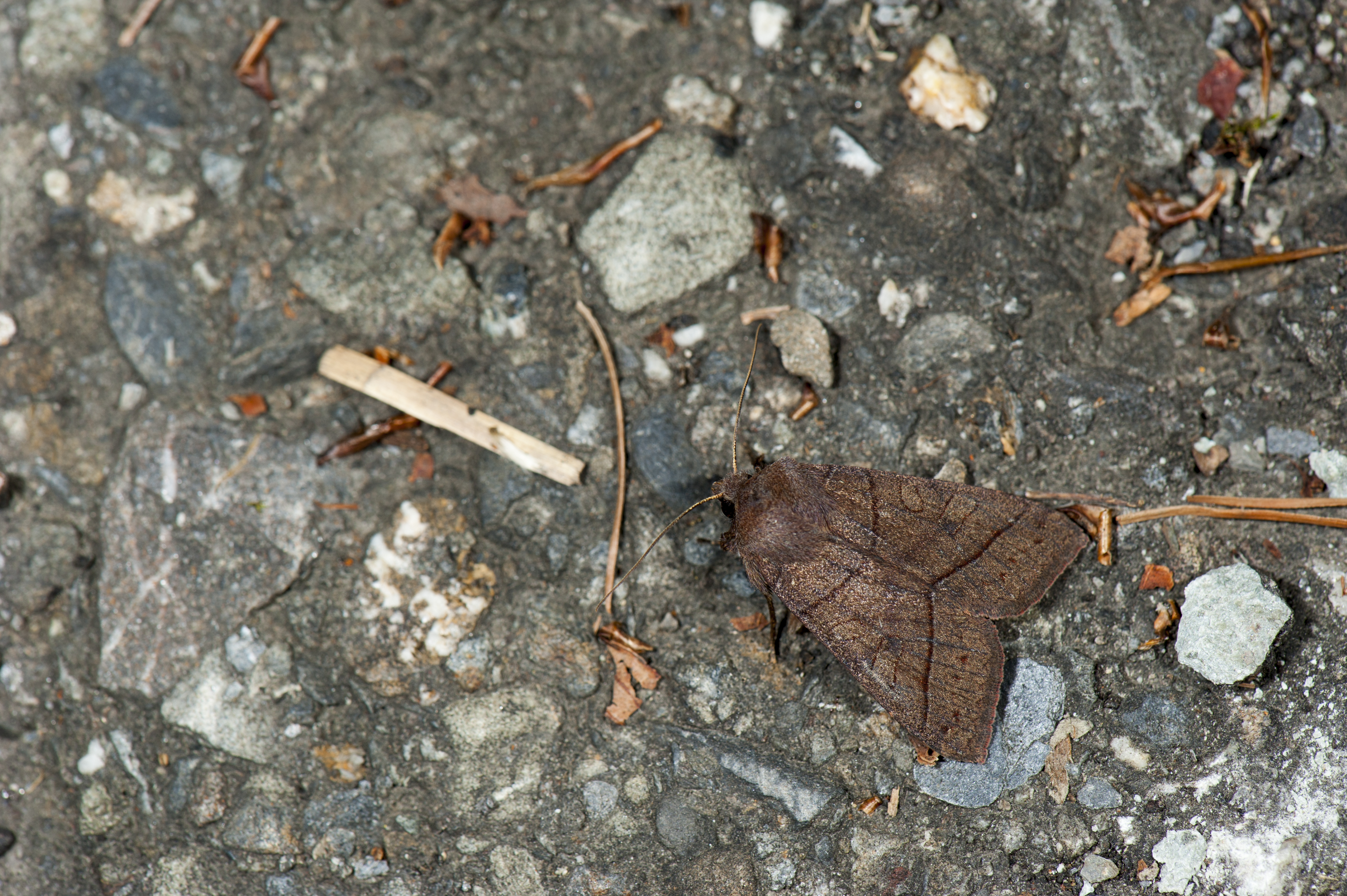
- Telorta yazakii

Scientific classification
- Domain: Eukaryota
- Kingdom: Animalia
- Phylum: Arthropoda
- Class: Insecta
- Order: Lepidoptera
- Superfamily: Noctuoidea
- Family: Noctuidae
- Subfamily: Cuculliinae
- Genus: Telorta; Warren in Seitz, 1910

= Telorta =

Genus of moths

Telorta is a genus of moths of the family Noctuidae.

== Species ==
- Telorta acuminata (Butler, 1878)
- Telorta divergens (Butler, 1879)
- Telorta edentata (Leech, 1889)
- Telorta falcipennis Boursin, 1958
