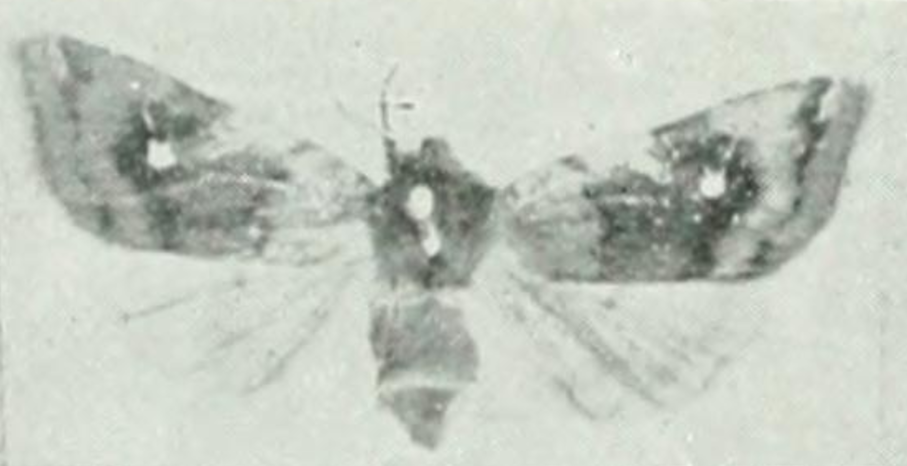
- Photograph of L. pulchella holotype

Scientific classification
- Domain: Eukaryota
- Kingdom: Animalia
- Phylum: Arthropoda
- Class: Insecta
- Order: Lepidoptera
- Superfamily: Noctuoidea
- Family: Noctuidae
- Subfamily: Cuculliinae
- Genus: Lycanades; Franclemont, 1937

Type species
- Xanthia pulchella Smith, 1900

= Lycanades =

Genus of moths

Lycanades is a genus of moths of the family Noctuidae.
