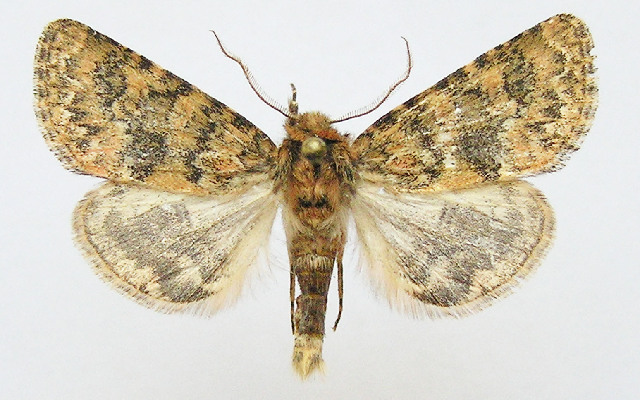
- Athaumasta splendida

Scientific classification
- Kingdom: Animalia
- Phylum: Arthropoda
- Class: Insecta
- Order: Lepidoptera
- Superfamily: Noctuoidea
- Family: Noctuidae
- Subfamily: Cuculliinae
- Genus: Athaumasta; Hampson, 1906

Synonyms
- Oederemia (Acronyctinae) Hampson, 1908; Thaumasta Staudinger, 1871

= Athaumasta =

Genus of moths

Athaumasta is a genus of moths of the family Noctuidae. The genus was erected by George Hampson in 1906.

== Species ==
- Athaumasta alaarcha Pekarsky, 2019 Kyrgyzstan
- Athaumasta argillacea Volynkin & Pekarsky, 2016 eastern Kazakhstan
- Athaumasta arida Volynkin & Saldaitis, 2019 Altai
- Athaumasta dzhungarica Volynkin & Saldaitis, 2019 Altai
- Athaumasta etugen Volynkin & Saldaitis, 2019 Altai
- Athaumasta expressa (Lederer, 1855) Altai
- Athaumasta gracilis (Draudt, 1931) Kirghizia
- Athaumasta kegena Pekarsky, 2018 south-eastern Kazakhstan
- Athaumasta koreana Ronkay & Kononenko, 1998
- Athaumasta kuchinichi Volynkin, Titov & Saldaitis, 2019 north-eastern Kasakhstan
- Athaumasta kurchuma Volynkin & Titov, 2019 eastern Kazakhstan
- Athaumasta kyrkyza Pekarsky, 2017 Kyrgyzstan
- Athaumasta lithoplasta (Hampson, 1908) western Turkestan
- Athaumasta melyakhi Pekarsky, 2017 Kyrgyzstan
- Athaumasta miltina (Püngeler, 1902) Krighizia
- Athaumasta nana (Staudinger, 1896)
- Athaumasta pekarskyi Volynkin, 2012
- Athaumasta siderigera (Christoph, 1893) Sajan
- Athaumasta simplivalva (Hacker & Schreier, 2010) Cape Verde
- Athaumasta splendida Bang-Haas, 1927 Sajan
- Athaumasta tarbagata Volynkin, Titov & Saldaitis, 2019 eastern Kazakhstan
