= Daseuplexia =

Scientific classification
- Kingdom: Animalia
- Phylum: Arthropoda
- Class: Insecta
- Order: Lepidoptera
- Superfamily: Noctuoidea
- Family: Noctuidae
- Subfamily: Cuculliinae
- Genus: Daseuplexia; Hampson, 1906

Genus of moths

Daseuplexia is a genus of moths of the family Noctuidae. The genus was erected by George Hampson in 1906.

== Species ==
- Daseuplexia brevipennata Hreblay, Peregovits & Ronkay, 1999 northern Vietnam
- Daseuplexia chloromagna Hreblay & Ronkay, 1998 Nepal
- Daseuplexia duplicata Hreblay & Ronkay, 1998 Nepal
- Daseuplexia erlangi Benedek, Babics & Saldaitis, 2011
- Daseuplexia inexpecta Ronkay, Ronkay, Gyulai & Hacker, 2010
- Daseuplexia issekutzi Ronkay, Ronkay, Gyulai & Hacker, 2010
- Daseuplexia khami Benedek, Babics & Saldaitis, 2011 Sichuan
- Daseuplexia lagenifera (Moore, 1882) Darjeeling
- Daseuplexia lageniformis (Hampson, 1894) Sikkim
- Daseuplexia majseae Benedek, Babics & Saldaitis, 2013 Sichuan
- Daseuplexia marmorata Hreblay & Ronkay, 1998 Nepal
- Daseuplexia minshana Benedek, Babics & Saldaitis, 2013 northern Sichuan
- Daseuplexia nekrasovi Ronkay, Ronkay, Gyulai & Hacker, 2010
- Daseuplexia oroplexina Ronkay, Ronkay, Gyulai & Hacker, 2010
- Daseuplexia pittergabori Ronkay, Ronkay, Gyulai & Hacker, 2010
- Daseuplexia shangrilai Benedek, Babics & Saldaitis, 2011 Yunnan
- Daseuplexia tertia Hreblay & Ronkay, 1999 Nepal
- Daseuplexia unicata Ronkay, Ronkay, Gyulai & Hacker, 2010
- Daseuplexia viridicincta Hreblay & Ronkay, 1998 Nepal
