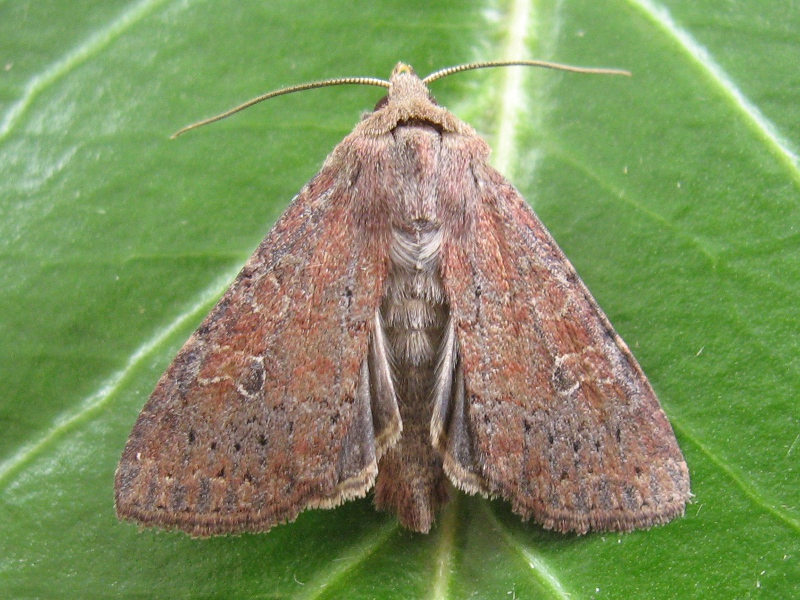

Scientific classification
- Domain: Eukaryota
- Kingdom: Animalia
- Phylum: Arthropoda
- Class: Insecta
- Order: Lepidoptera
- Superfamily: Noctuoidea
- Family: Noctuidae
- Genus: Parastichtis
- Species: P. suspecta

Binomial name
- Parastichtis suspecta (Hübner, 1817)

Synonyms
- Noctua suspecta Hübner, 1817; Caradrina iners German, 1817; Noctua congener Hübner, [1817]; Caradrina iners Treitschke, 1825; Oligia karafutonis Matsumura, 1925; Amathes iners f. tibetica Draudt, 1950; Parastichtis suspecta erythema Henriot, 1960; Bryophila discivaria Walker, 1856; Parastichtis discivaria; Taeniosea perbellis Grote, 1874; Taeniosea gentilis Grote, 1874

= Parastichtis suspecta =

Suspected

Species of moth

Parastichtis suspecta, the suspected, is a species of moth in the family Noctuidae. It is found from most of Europe through Russia and east through the Palearctic to Japan. It is also found in North America.

== Technical description and variation ==
The wingspan is 29–34 mm. Adults are variable with a number of forms ranging from plain to more variegated. Forewing pale luteous grey, with sometimes strong red-brown, rufous or brownish tinge; the lines and shading only slightly darker; the median shade distinct; the upper stigmata large, with distinct whitish outline; submarginal line pale, waved, the terminal area beyond it darker; hindwing dull grey; of this form the very palest specimens with scarcely any markings are ab. pallida Tutt, while the grey examples with no rufous or luteous tinge whatever are grisea Tutt; — suspecta Hbn [type] is more mottled with darker, brownish red, shades; — in nigrescens Tutt these dark shades are intensified and the whole insect becomes blackish red brown; the bright red specimens, with lines and markings clear are rufa Tutt; — while the red brown forms mixed with purplish grey and with paler stigmata are variegata

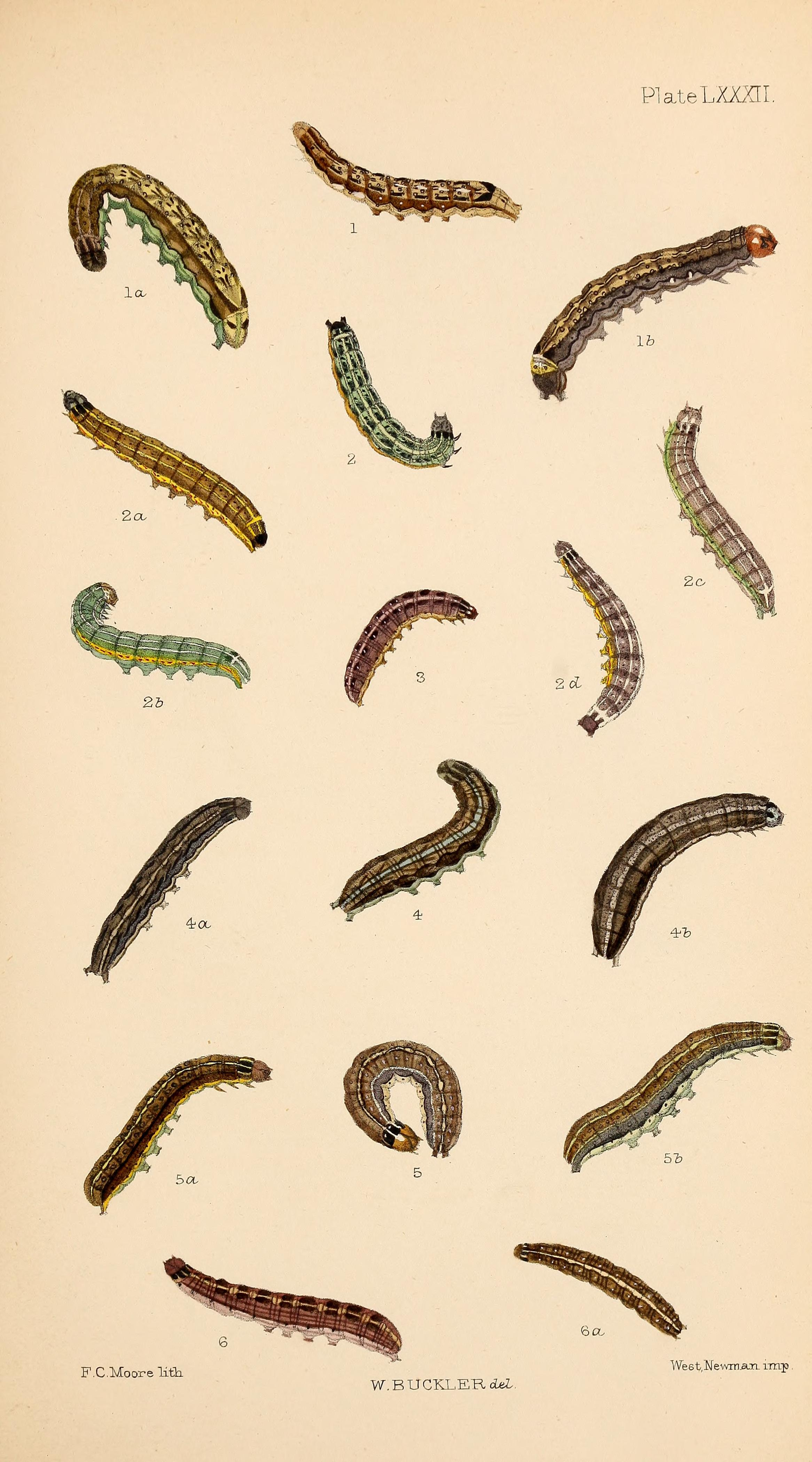
Fig.3 larva

== Biology ==
Adults are on wing from late July to August in one generation in Europe.

Larva purplish brown; dorsal line yellowish white, well-defined; subdorsal lines faint; tubercles prominent; underside pale yellowish. The larvae feed on Salix lapponum, Salix caprea and Salix phylicifolia. The young larvae live in spun shoots of the host plant. When older, they live in spun leaves. Larvae can be found from April to June. Pupation takes place underground. The species overwinters as an egg on the host plant.
