= Bryomima =

Scientific classification
- Domain: Eukaryota
- Kingdom: Animalia
- Phylum: Arthropoda
- Class: Insecta
- Order: Lepidoptera
- Superfamily: Noctuoidea
- Family: Noctuidae
- Subfamily: Cuculliinae
- Genus: Bryomima; Staudinger, 1900

Genus of moths

Bryomima is a genus of moths of the family Noctuidae.

== Species ==
- Bryomima carducha Staudinger, 1900
- Bryomima hakkariensis de Freina & Hacker, 1985
