= Lophoterges =

Scientific classification
- Kingdom: Animalia
- Phylum: Arthropoda
- Class: Insecta
- Order: Lepidoptera
- Superfamily: Noctuoidea
- Family: Noctuidae
- Subfamily: Cuculliinae
- Genus: Lophoterges; Hampson, 1906

Genus of moths

Lophoterges is a genus of moths of the family Noctuidae.

== Species ==
- Lophoterges hoerhammeri (Wagner, 1931)
- Lophoterges millierei (Staudinger, 1871)
