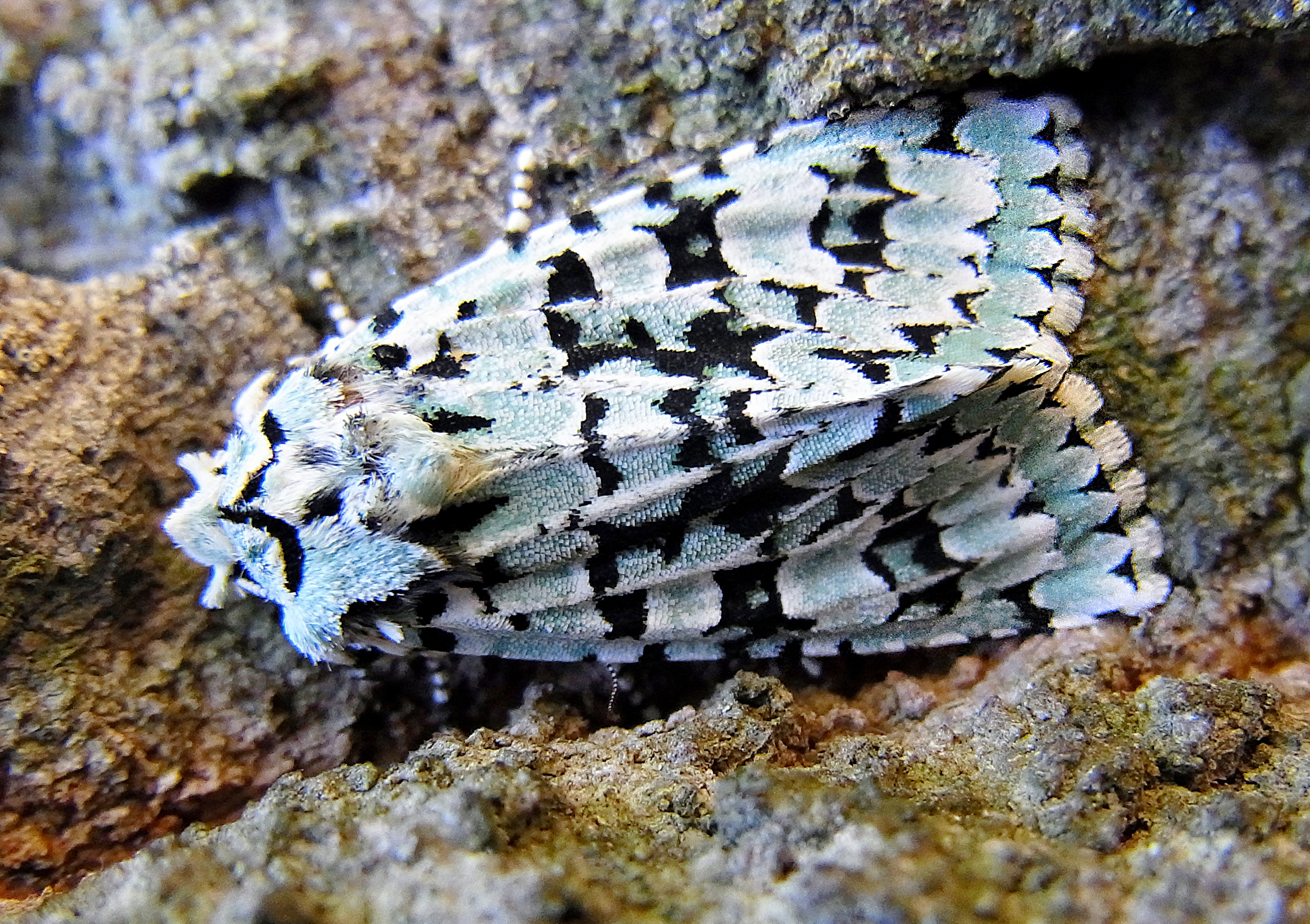
- Dichonia aprilina

Scientific classification
- Kingdom: Animalia
- Phylum: Arthropoda
- Clade: Pancrustacea
- Class: Insecta
- Order: Lepidoptera
- Superfamily: Noctuoidea
- Family: Noctuidae
- Subfamily: Cuculliinae
- Genus: Dichonia; Hübner, 1821

= Dichonia =

Genus of moths

Dichonia is a genus of moths of the family Noctuidae. The genus was erected by Jacob Hübner in 1821.

== Species ==
- Dichonia aeruginea (Hübner, [1808])
- Dichonia aprilina (Linnaeus, 1758) syn Griposia aprilina (Linnaeus, 1758)
- Dichonia chlorata Hampson, 1912
- Dichonia jahannamah (Fibiger, Stangelmaier, Wieser & Zahiri, 2008)
- Dichonia convergens (Denis & Schiffermüller, 1775)
- Dichonia pinkeri (Kobes, 1973)
- Dichonia skyvai (Dvorak & Sumpich, 2010)
- Dichonia wegneri (Kobes & Fibiger, 2003)
