= Eudaphaenura =

Scientific classification
- Kingdom: Animalia
- Phylum: Arthropoda
- Class: Insecta
- Order: Lepidoptera
- Superfamily: Noctuoidea
- Family: Noctuidae
- Subfamily: Cuculliinae
- Genus: Eudaphaenura; Viette, 1963

Type species
- Epicausis splendens Viette, 1954

Genus of moths

Eudaphaenura is a genus of moths of the family Noctuidae. The species of this genus are found in Madagascar.

== Species ==
- Eudaphaenura catalai (Viette, 1954)
- Eudaphaenura griveaudi (Viette, 1961)
- Eudaphaenura splendens (Viette, 1954)
