= Daphoenura =

Scientific classification
- Domain: Eukaryota
- Kingdom: Animalia
- Phylum: Arthropoda
- Class: Insecta
- Order: Lepidoptera
- Superfamily: Noctuoidea
- Family: Noctuidae
- Subfamily: Cuculliinae
- Genus: Daphoenura; Butler, 1878
- Species: D. fasciata

Binomial name
- Daphoenura fasciata Butler, 1878

Genus of moths

Daphoenura is a monotypic moth genus of the family Noctuidae. Its only species, Daphoenura fasciata, is found on Madagascar. Both the genus and species were first described by Arthur Gardiner Butler in 1878.
