= Evanina =

Scientific classification
- Domain: Eukaryota
- Kingdom: Animalia
- Phylum: Arthropoda
- Class: Insecta
- Order: Lepidoptera
- Superfamily: Noctuoidea
- Family: Noctuidae
- Subfamily: Cuculliinae
- Genus: Evanina; Boursin, 1963

Genus of moths

Evanina is a genus of moths of the family Noctuidae.

== Species ==
- Evanina wiltshirei (Boursin, 1957)
