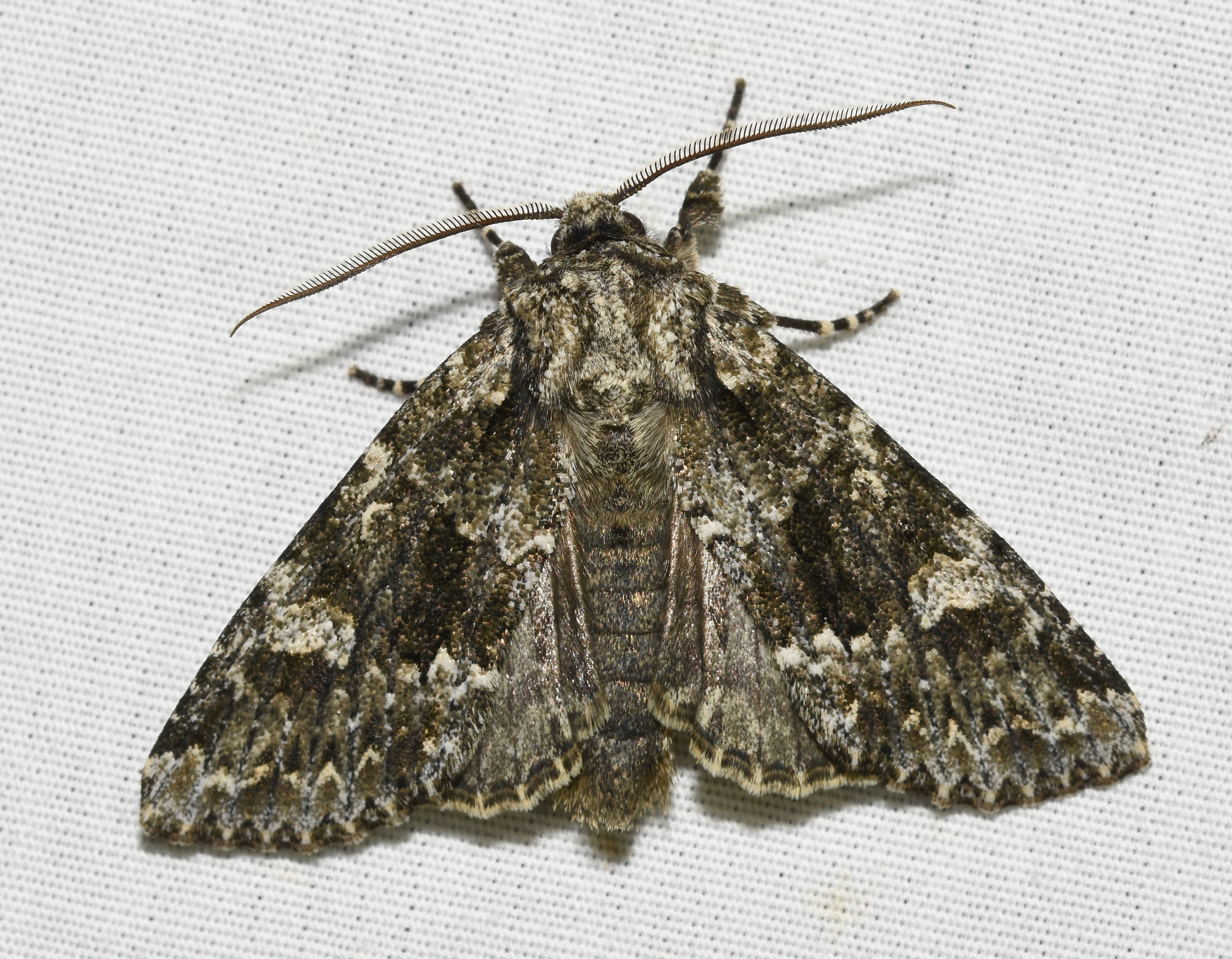
- Pachypolia atricornis

Scientific classification
- Kingdom: Animalia
- Phylum: Arthropoda
- Class: Insecta
- Order: Lepidoptera
- Superfamily: Noctuoidea
- Family: Noctuidae
- Subfamily: Cuculliinae
- Genus: Pachypolia; Grote, 1874

= Pachypolia =

Genus of moths

Pachypolia is a genus of moths in the family Noctuidae.

== Species ==
- Pachypolia atricornis Grote, 1874
