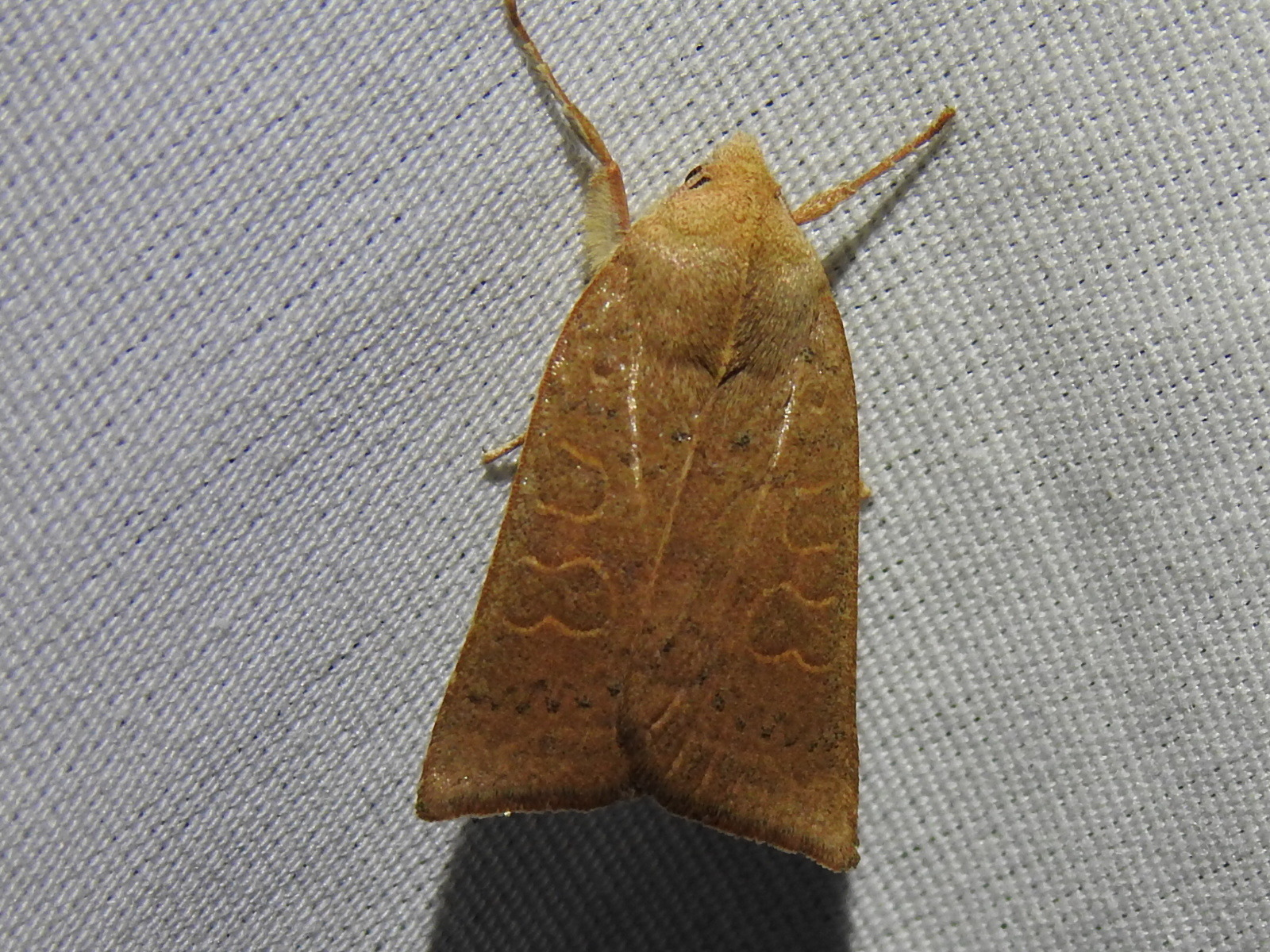
- Xystopeplus rufago

Scientific classification
- Kingdom: Animalia
- Phylum: Arthropoda
- Clade: Pancrustacea
- Class: Insecta
- Order: Lepidoptera
- Superfamily: Noctuoidea
- Family: Noctuidae
- Subtribe: Xylenina
- Genus: Xystopeplus; Franclemont, 1937

= Xystopeplus =

Genus of moths

Xystopeplus is a monotypic genus of moths in the family Noctuidae. Its only species is Xystopeplus rufago, commonly known as the red-winged sallow moth.

== Species ==
- Xystopeplus rufago (Hübner, 1818)
