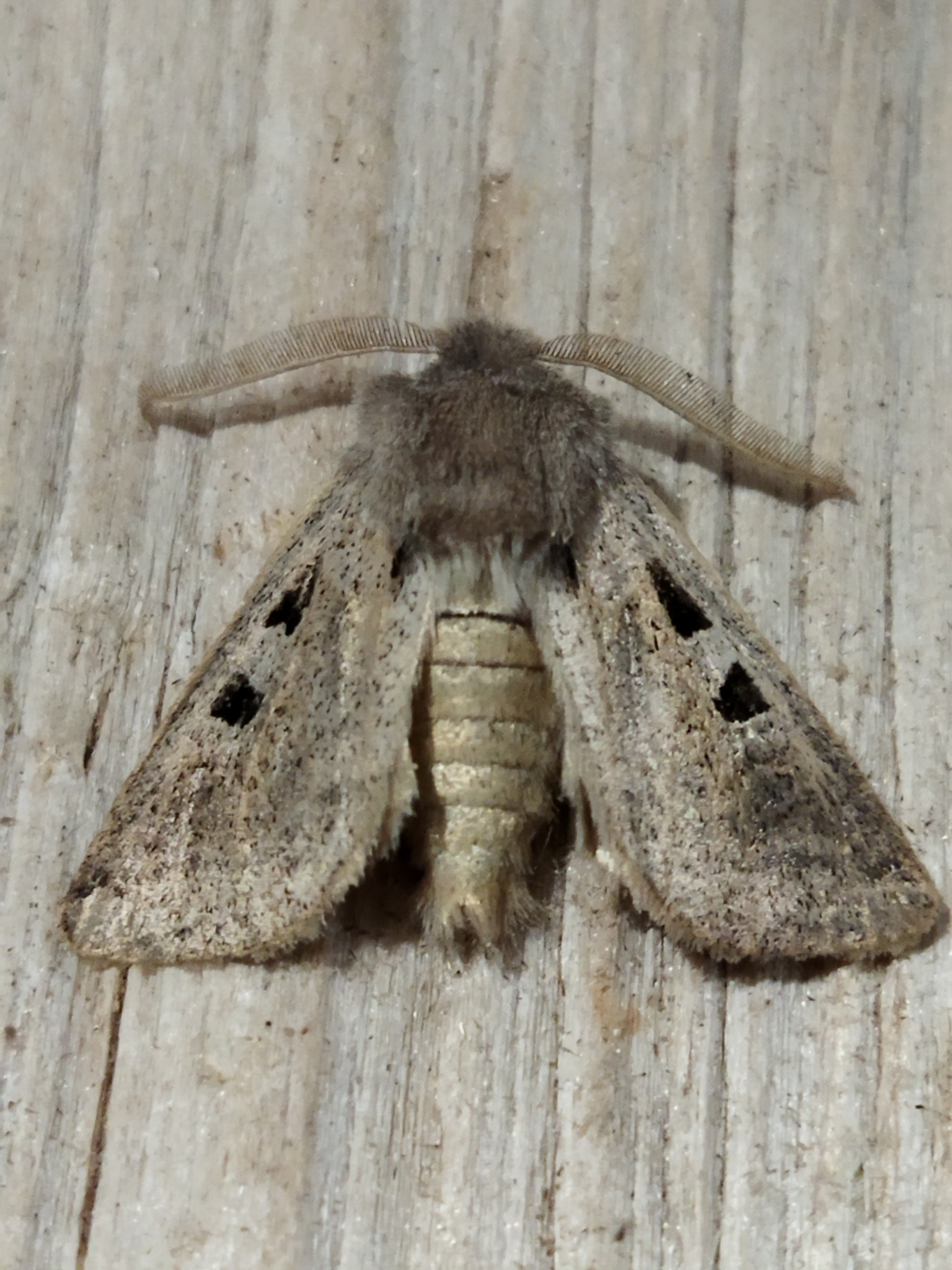
- Episema tersa

Scientific classification
- Domain: Eukaryota
- Kingdom: Animalia
- Phylum: Arthropoda
- Class: Insecta
- Order: Lepidoptera
- Superfamily: Noctuoidea
- Family: Noctuidae
- Genus: Episema; Ochsenheimer, 1816

Synonyms
- Orthogramma Reichenbach, 1817; Episeme Freyer, 1849; Cladocera Rambur, 1858

= Episema (moth) =

Genus of moths

Episema is a genus of moths of the family Noctuidae. The genus was described by Ochsenheimer in 1816.

== Species ==
- Episema amasina (Hampson, 1906) Turkey
- Episema brandbergensis Hacker, 2004 Namibia
- Episema didymogramma (Boursin, 1955) Turkey
- Episema glaucina (Esper, 1789) northern Africa, central and southern Europe, Turkmenistan, Sudan
- Episema gozmanyi Ronkay & Hacker, 1985 Crete
- Episema grueneri Boisduval, [1837] south-western Europe
- Episema haemapasta (Hampson, 1914) Libya
- Episema korsakovi (Christoph, 1885) south-eastern Europe, Caucaus, Transcaucasus
- Episema kourion Nilsson, Svendsen & Fibiger, 1999 Cyprus
- Episema lederi Christoph, 1885 south-eastern Europe, Turkey, Transcaucasus
- Episema lemoniopsis Hacker, 2001
- Episema minuta Boursin & Ebert, 1976 Afghanistan
- Episema minutoides Ronkay, Varga & Hreblay, 1998 Turkmenistan (Kopet Dagh)
- Episema scillae (Chrétien, 1888) Algeria
- Episema tersa (Denis & Schiffermüller, 1775) south-eastern Europe, Sicily, Tunisia, Ukraine
