= Eremochlaena =

Scientific classification
- Domain: Eukaryota
- Kingdom: Animalia
- Phylum: Arthropoda
- Class: Insecta
- Order: Lepidoptera
- Superfamily: Noctuoidea
- Family: Noctuidae
- Genus: Eremochlaena; Boursin, 1953

Type species
- Eremochlaena orana Lucas, 1849

Genus of moths

Eremochlaena is a genus of moths of the family Noctuidae, first described by Charles Boursin in 1953. The type species is Eremochlaena orana Lucas, 1849.

== Species list ==
Species accepted by IRMNG are:

- Eremochlaena orana Lucas, 1849
- Eremochlaena oranoides Boursin, 1953
- Eremochlaena pallidior Rungs, 1972
