= Aumakua omaomao =

Scientific classification
- Kingdom: Animalia
- Phylum: Arthropoda
- Clade: Pancrustacea
- Class: Insecta
- Order: Lepidoptera
- Superfamily: Noctuoidea
- Family: Noctuidae
- Subfamily: Noctuinae
- Genus: Aumakua; Hayes & Sattler, 1980
- Species: A. omaomao

Binomial name
- Aumakua omaomao Hayes & Sattler, 1980

Genus of moths

Aumakua is a genus of moths of the family Noctuidae, consisting of one species, Aumakua omaomao. The genus is endemic to Hawaii. The genus name refers to aumakua, the Hawaiian sprits of ancestors, while the specific name is Hawaiian for "green".

The wingspan is 37–48 mm (1.5–1.9 in).
