= Eremopola =

Scientific classification
- Domain: Eukaryota
- Kingdom: Animalia
- Phylum: Arthropoda
- Class: Insecta
- Order: Lepidoptera
- Superfamily: Noctuoidea
- Family: Noctuidae
- Subfamily: Noctuinae
- Genus: Eremopola; Warren in Seitz, 1911

Type species
- Eremopola lenis (Staudinger, 1891)

Genus of moths

Eremopola is a genus of moths of the family Noctuidae, found in Spain, Portugal, North Africa, and the Mediterranean region. It was first described by William Warren in 1911. The type species is Eremopola lenis (Staudinger, 1891).

== Species ==
- Eremopola faroulti (Rothschild, 1920)
- Eremopola grammoscelis Rothschild
- Eremopola lenis (Staudinger, 1891)
- Eremopola magnifica Rothschild, 1914
- Eremopola marmarides Turati, 1924
- Eremopola orana (Lucas, 1849)
- Eremopola oranoides (Boursin, 1953)
- Eremopola radoti Boursin, 1934
