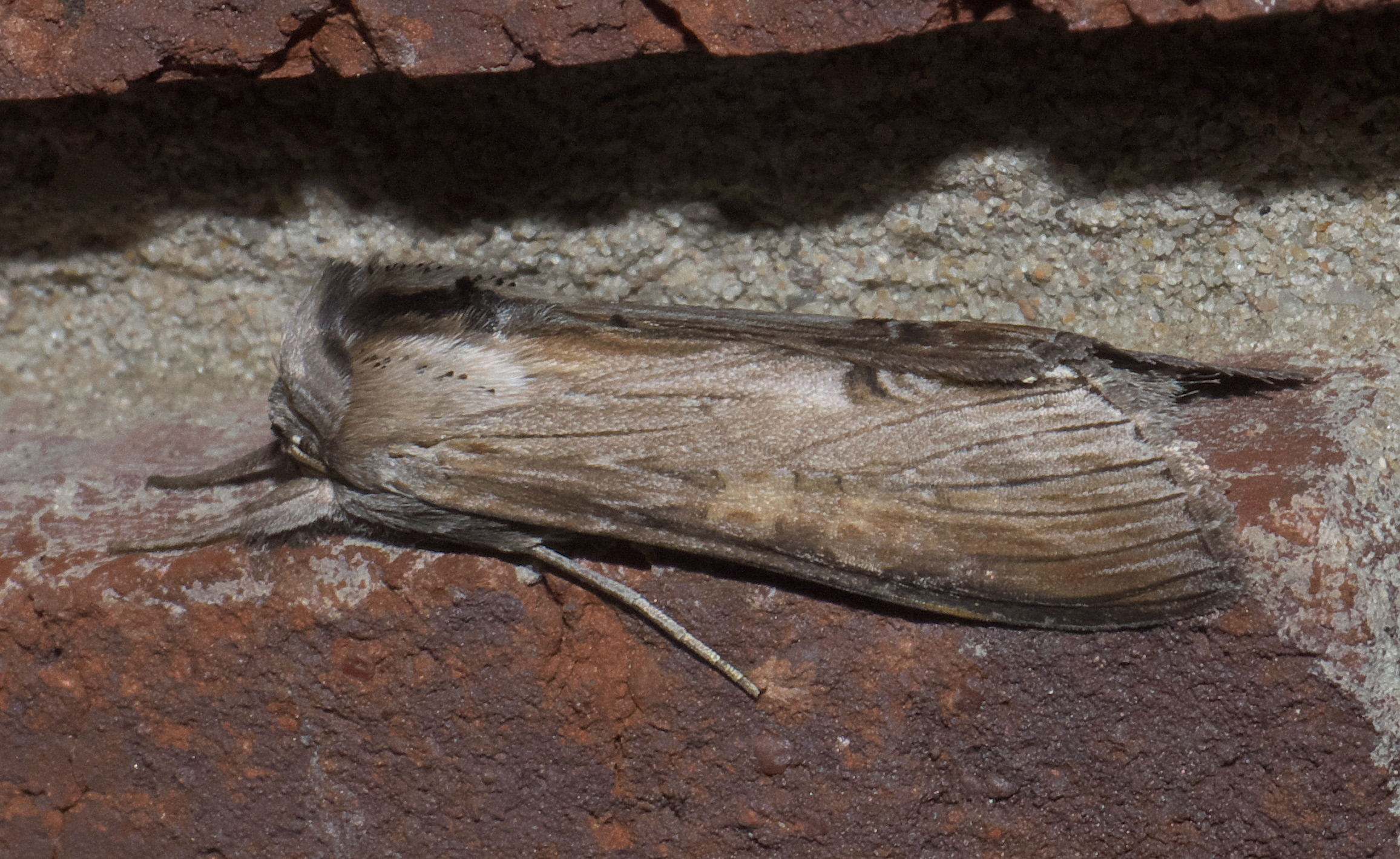

Scientific classification
- Kingdom: Animalia
- Phylum: Arthropoda
- Clade: Pancrustacea
- Class: Insecta
- Order: Lepidoptera
- Superfamily: Noctuoidea
- Family: Noctuidae
- Genus: Cucullia
- Species: C. asteroides

Binomial name
- Cucullia asteroides Guenée, 1852

= Cucullia asteroides =

Species of moth

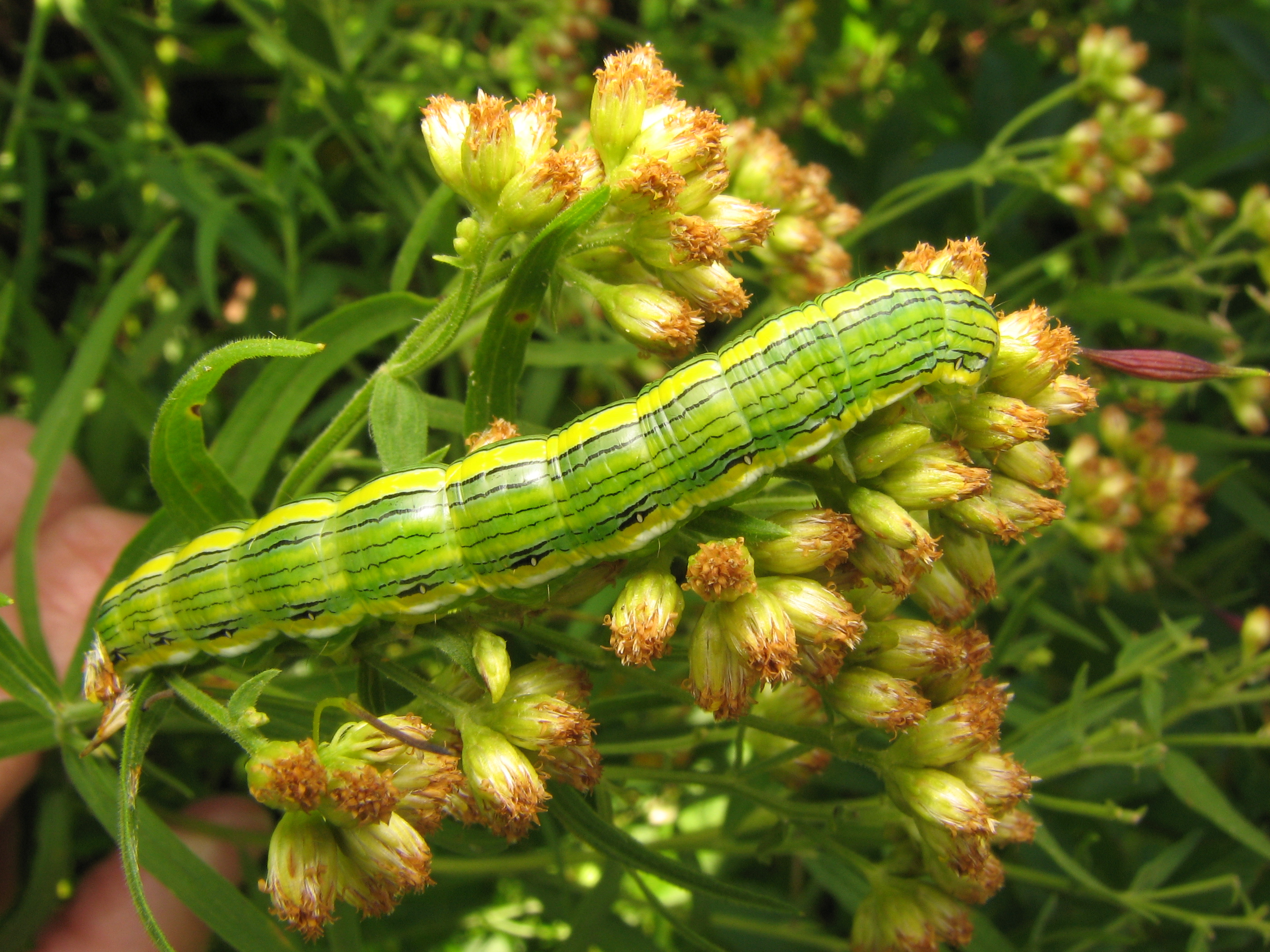
Caterpillar on Euthamia flower

Cucullia asteroides, commonly known as the goldenrod hooded owlet or asteroid moth, is a species of moth in the family Noctuidae (the owlet moths). It is found in North America.

== Biology ==
-being updated-

Asteroid larvae on goldenrod
