= Hypsophila (moth) =

Scientific classification
- Domain: Eukaryota
- Kingdom: Animalia
- Phylum: Arthropoda
- Class: Insecta
- Order: Lepidoptera
- Superfamily: Noctuoidea
- Family: Noctuidae
- Subfamily: Cuculliinae
- Genus: Hypsophila; Staudinger, 1888

Genus of moths

Hypsophila is a genus of moths of the family Noctuidae.

== Species ==
- Hypsophila alpina
- Hypsophila haberhaueri
- Hypsophila jugorum
- Hypsophila klapperichi
- Hypsophila lunulata
- Hypsophila medialis
- Hypsophila meinhardti
- Hypsophila pamira
- Hypsophila postlimbalis
- Hypsophila tamerlana
