= Georgy Zolotarenko =

Russian lepidopterist

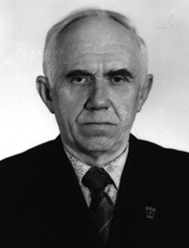
Georgy S. Zolotarenko

Georgy Sergeevich Zolotarenko (August 8, 1922 Kirovograd, Ukraine - April 6, 2002), ScDr., professor, was a Russian entomologist specialized in Lepidoptera, mainly Noctuidae: Noctuinae.

Zolotarenko graduated from the Department of Biology and Pedology, Tomsk State University in 1951. From 1951, he worked in the Biological Institute of West Siberian Branch of the Academy of Science of the U.S.S.R. (now the Institute of Animal Systematics and Ecology, Siberian Branch of the Russian Academy of Sciences) where he was the chief of the Zoological Museum (1983-1987), then the chief scientific worker in the same museum (1987-2002). His main scientific interests were faunal distribution, biology and systematics of Macroheterocera, mainly Noctuidae: Noctuinae. Zolotarenko had many pupils (T.V. Bubnova, N.V. Mastshenko, N.A. Utkin, S.V. Vasilenko, V.V. Dubatolov, V.Yu. Kryukov, etc.).

== Publications ==
- With V. V. Dubatolov see
- Full list under construction at which gives further details and two portrait photographs.

== Most important publications ==
- Yudin, B.S. & Zolotarenko, G.S., 1970: Type collections in Zoological Museum of the Biological Institute, Siberian Branch, AS USSR. In: Fauna Sibiri: 10-17, Novosibirsk (in Russian).
- Zolotarenko, G.S., 1970: Agrotinae (Noctuidae) of West Siberia: 1-436, Novosibirsk (in Russian).
- Zolotarenko, G.S., 1975: Species of the genus Actias Leach (Lepidoptera, Saturniidae) from the USSR fauna. In: Taksonomiya i ekologiya zhivotnykh Sibiri: 53-61, Novosibirsk (in Russian). (Series: New and little known species of Siberian fauna, No 9).
- Zolotarenko, G.S., 1976: For a knowledge of the Noctuidae fauna (Lepidoptera, Noctuidae) of Kamchatka and Sakhalin. In: Fauna gelmintov i chlenistonogikh Sibiri: 366-381, Novosibirsk (in Russian). (Proceedings of Biological Institute, SB AS USSR, No 18).
- Zolotarenko, G.S., Petrova, V.P. & Shiryaev, V.V., 1976: Hawk-moths (Lepidoptera, Sphingidae) of West Siberia. In: Chlenistonogie Sibiri: 192-224, Novosibirsk (in Russian). (Proceedings of Biological Institute, SB AS USSR, No 34).
- Mikkola, K., Ahola, M. & Zolotarenko, G.S., 1987: On the biology and developmental stages of the Palaearctic species of the genus Stamnodes Guenee (Lepidoptera Geometridae). Annales Entomologici Fennici 53: 23-29.
- Zolotarenko, G.S., 1993: A new noctuid species of the genus Dasypolia Gn. (Lepidoptera, Cuculliinae) from Altai. Siberian biological journal 1993 (3): 42-43 (in Russian).
- Dubatolov, V.V., Zolotarenko, G.S. & Utkin, N.A., 1995: Moths from Southern Sakhalin and Kunashir, collected in 1989. Part 6. Noctuidae. Japan Heterocerists' J. 184: 140-150.
- Zolotarenko, G.S. & Dubatolov, V.V., 1995: A new species of the genus Maliattha Walker, 1863 from South Primorye (Russian Far East) (Lepidoptera, Noctuidae). Atalanta 26 (1/2): 299-301.
- Zolotarenko, G.S. & Dubatolov, V.V., 2000: A check-list of Noctuidae (Lepidoptera) of the Russian part of the West Siberian plain. Far Eastern Entomologist 94: 1-23.

=== New taxa of Noctuidae described ===
- Graphiphora obscura Zolotarenko, 1970; New and little known species of the fauna of Siberia 3: 33 (=Xestia vidua (Staudinger, 1892))
- Dasypolia tuektiensis Zolotarenko, 1993; Siberian Biological Journal 1993 (3): 42
- Maliattha khasanica Zolotarenko et Dubatolov, 1995; Atalanta 26 (1/2): 299
- Cryphia reservata Zolotarenko et Dubatolov, 1995 [1996]; Actias 2 (1/2): 33 (=Victrix fabiani Varga & L.Ronkay, 1989)
- Acronicta major atritaigensa Dubatolov et Zolotarenko, 1995 [1996]; Actias 2 (1/2): 34
