= Omia (moth) =

Scientific classification
- Kingdom: Animalia
- Phylum: Arthropoda
- Clade: Pancrustacea
- Class: Insecta
- Order: Lepidoptera
- Superfamily: Noctuoidea
- Family: Noctuidae
- Subfamily: Cuculliinae
- Genus: Omia; Hübner, 1821

Genus of moths

Omia is a genus of moths of the family Noctuidae.

== Species ==
- Omia banghaasi Stauder, 1930
- Omia cyclopea (Graslin, 1837)
- Omia cymbalariae (Hübner, 1809)
