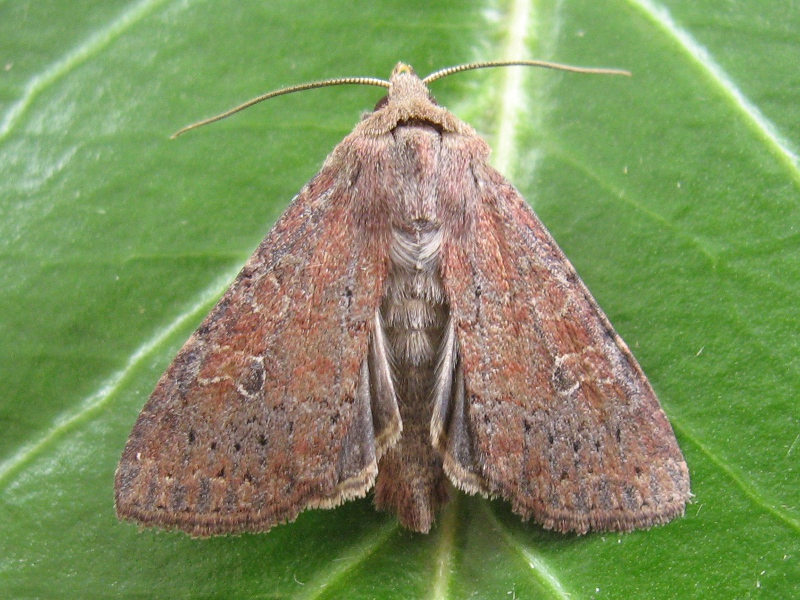

Scientific classification
- Kingdom: Animalia
- Phylum: Arthropoda
- Clade: Pancrustacea
- Class: Insecta
- Order: Lepidoptera
- Superfamily: Noctuoidea
- Family: Noctuidae
- Subfamily: Xyleninae
- Genus: Parastichtis; Hübner, 1821

Synonyms
- Parastictus Agassiz, [1847]; Dyschorista Lederer, 1857; Taeniosea Grote, 1874

= Parastichtis =

Genus of moths

Parastichtis is a genus of moths of the family Noctuidae.

== Species ==
- Parastichtis suspecta (Hübner, [1817]) (syn: Parastichtis discivaria (Walker, 1856))
