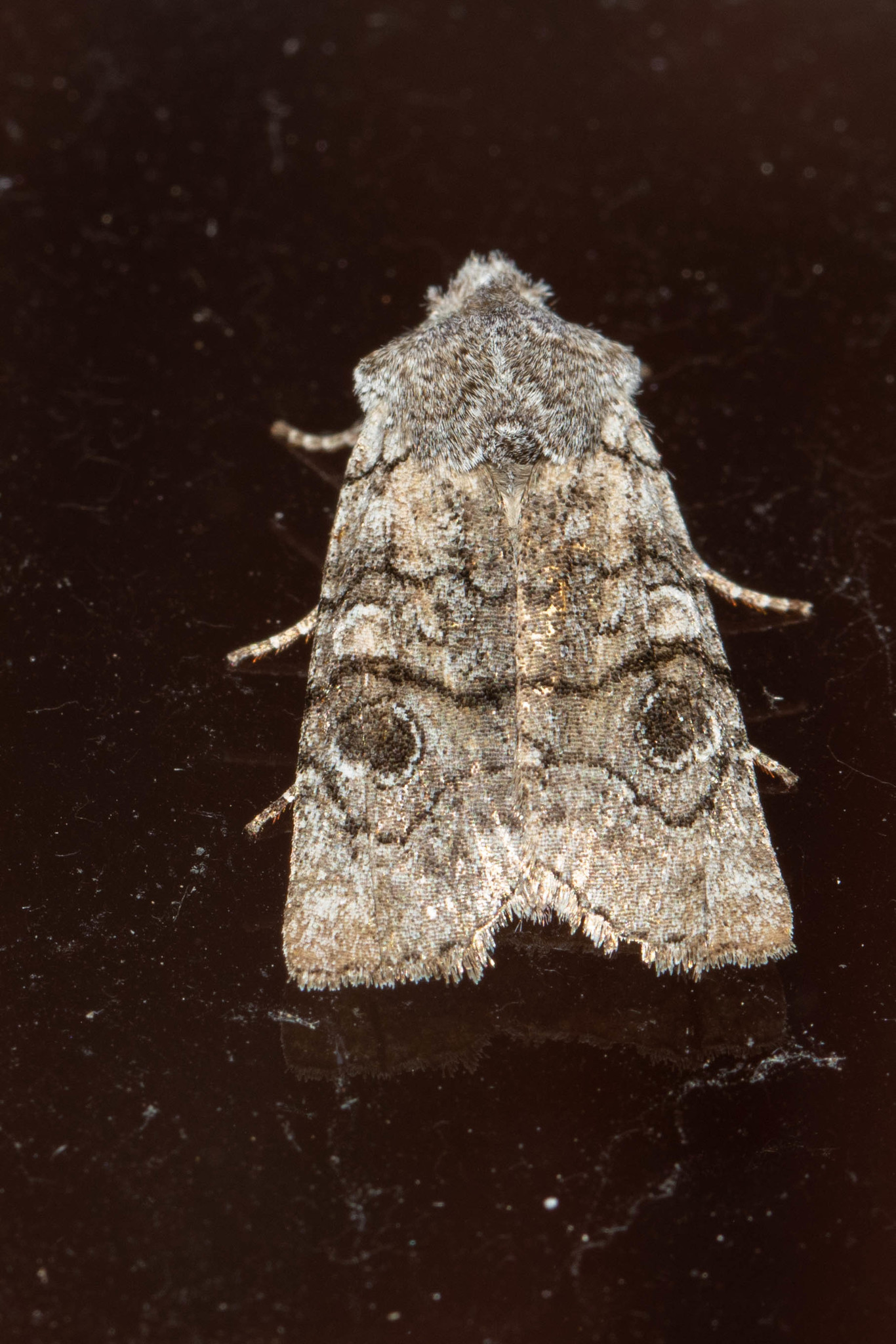
- Litholomia napaea, false pinion moth, Canada

Scientific classification
- Kingdom: Animalia
- Phylum: Arthropoda
- Class: Insecta
- Order: Lepidoptera
- Superfamily: Noctuoidea
- Family: Noctuidae
- Subfamily: Xyleninae
- Tribe: Xylenini
- Genus: Litholomia; Grote, 1875

= Litholomia =

Genus of moths

Litholomia, known commonly as the false pinion moth, is a genus of cutworm or dart moths in the family Noctuidae. There are at least four described species in Litholomia, found in the holarctic.

== Species ==
These four species belong to the genus Litholomia:

- Litholomia gansuana (Kononenko, 2009) (Asia)
- Litholomia napaea (Morrison, 1874) (false pinion moth) (North America)
- Litholomia pacifica (Kononenko, 1978) (east Asia)
- Litholomia umbrifasciata (Kononenko, 2009)
