= List of noctuid genera: N =

The huge moth family Noctuidae contains the following genera:

A B C D E F G H I J K L M N O P Q R S T U V W X Y Z

- Naarda
- Nabartha
- Naboa
- Nacerasa
- Nacna
- Nacopa
- Naenia
- Naesia
- Nagadeba
- Naganoella
- Nagara
- Nagia
- Nahara
- Naharra
- Namangana
- Namanganum
- Nanamonodes
- Nanthilda
- Naranga
- Narangodes
- Narcaea
- Narcotica
- Narthecophora
- Narulla
- Nasaya
- Nazuda
- Neachrostia
- Neathyrma
- Nebrissa
- Nechesia
- Nedra
- Nedroma
- Neeugoa
- Nekrasovia
- Neleucania
- Neoborolia
- Neocalymnia
- Neocerynea
- Neochera
- Neochrostis
- Neocleptria
- Neocodia
- Neocomia
- Neocucullia
- Neoerastria
- Neogabara
- Neogalea
- Neogrotella
- Neoherminia
- Neolaphygma
- Neolita
- Neomanobia
- Neomilichia
- Neomonodes
- Neopalthis
- Neopangrapta
- Neophaenis
- Neophaeus
- Neopistria
- Neoplusia
- Neoptista
- Neoptodes
- Neosema
- Neostichtis
- Neostrotia
- Neotarache
- Neothripa
- Neotuerta
- Nepaloridia
- Neperigea
- Nephelemorpha
- Nephelina
- Nephelistis
- Nephelodes
- Nerastria
- Nereisana
- Nesaegocera
- Nesamiptis
- Netrocerocora
- Neumichtis
- Neumoegenia
- Neuquenioa
- Neuranethes
- Neurois
- Neuronia
- Neustrotia
- Neviasca
- Nezonycta
- Niaboma
- Niaccaba
- Niaccabana
- Nicetas
- Nicevillea
- Nigetia
- Nigramma
- Nigryigoga
- Niguza
- Nikara
- Nimasia
- Niphonyx
- Niphosticta
- Nipista
- Nocloa
- Noctasota
- Nocthadena
- Noctua
- Noctubourgognea
- Noctuites
- Noctulizeria
- Nodaria
- Nolaphana
- Nolasena
- Nolaseniola
- Nolasodes
- Nonagria
- Noropsis
- Noshimea
- Notioplusia
- Notocyma
- Nubiothis
- Nudifrons
- Numeniastes
- Nychioptera
- Nyctennomos
- Nycterophaeta
- Nyctipolia
- Nyctobrya
- Nyctodryas
- Nyctycia
- Nyctyciomorpha
- Nyeanella
- Nymbis
- Nyodes
- Nyssocnemis
- Nytorga
