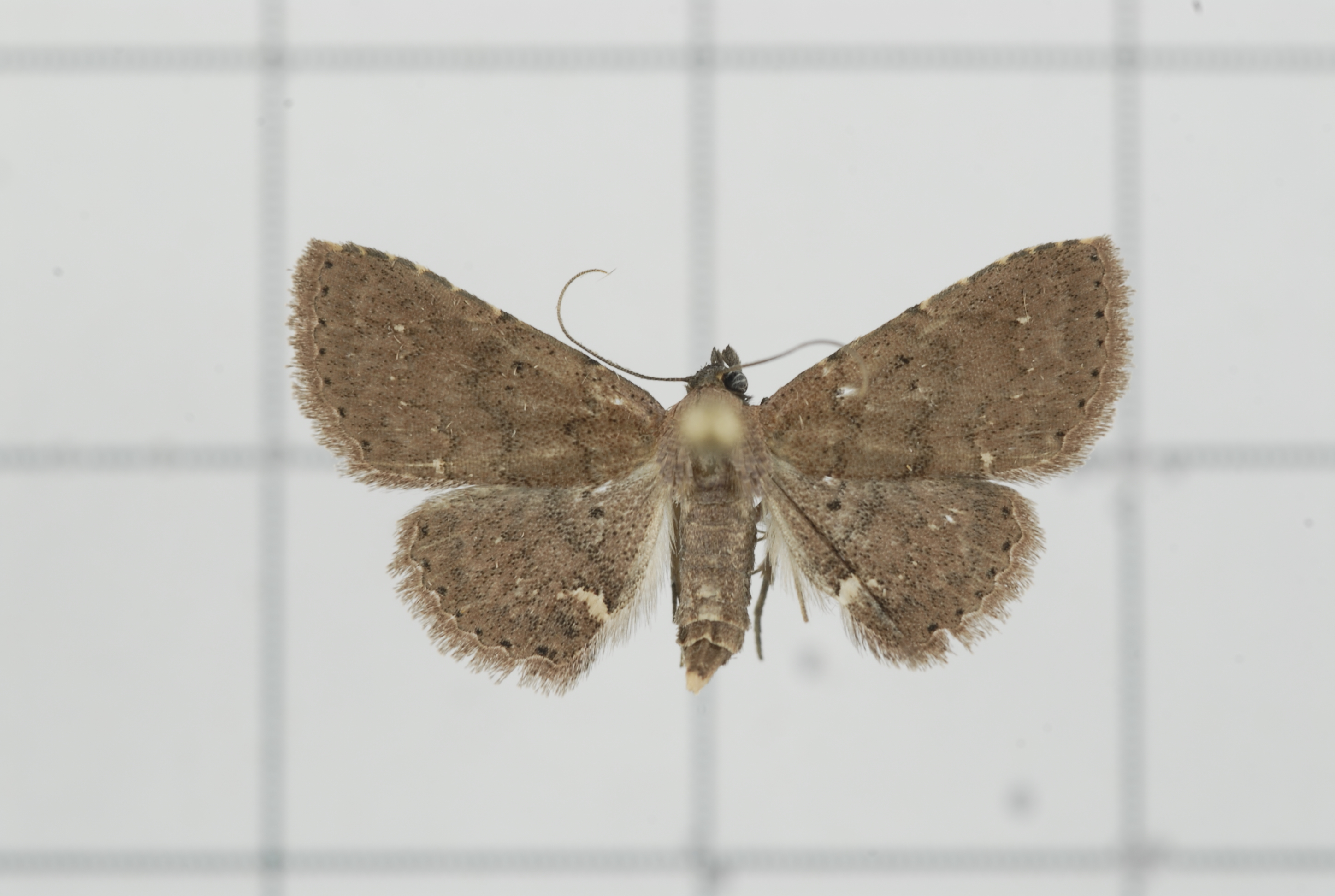

Scientific classification
- Kingdom: Animalia
- Phylum: Arthropoda
- Class: Insecta
- Order: Lepidoptera
- Superfamily: Noctuoidea
- Family: Noctuidae
- Subfamily: Acontiinae
- Genus: Carmara; Walker, [1863]
- Species: C. subcervina

Binomial name
- Carmara subcervina (Walker, 1864)

Synonyms
- Generic: Gyrognatha Hampson, 1893; Zagira Walker, 1866; Specific: Zagira acidaliaria Walker, 1866; Gyrognatha atriceps Hampson, 1893

= Carmara =

Genus of moths

Carmara is a monotypic moth genus of the family Noctuidae. Its only species, Carmara subcervina, is found in Sri Lanka, Japan, Taiwan, Borneo and Australia. Both the genus and species were first described by Francis Walker in 1864.

Lepidoptera and Some Other Life Forms gives Carmara as a synonym of Nechesia Walker, 1862.Savela, Markku, ed. (August 30, 2019). "Nechesia Walker, 1862". Lepidoptera and Some Other Life Forms.
