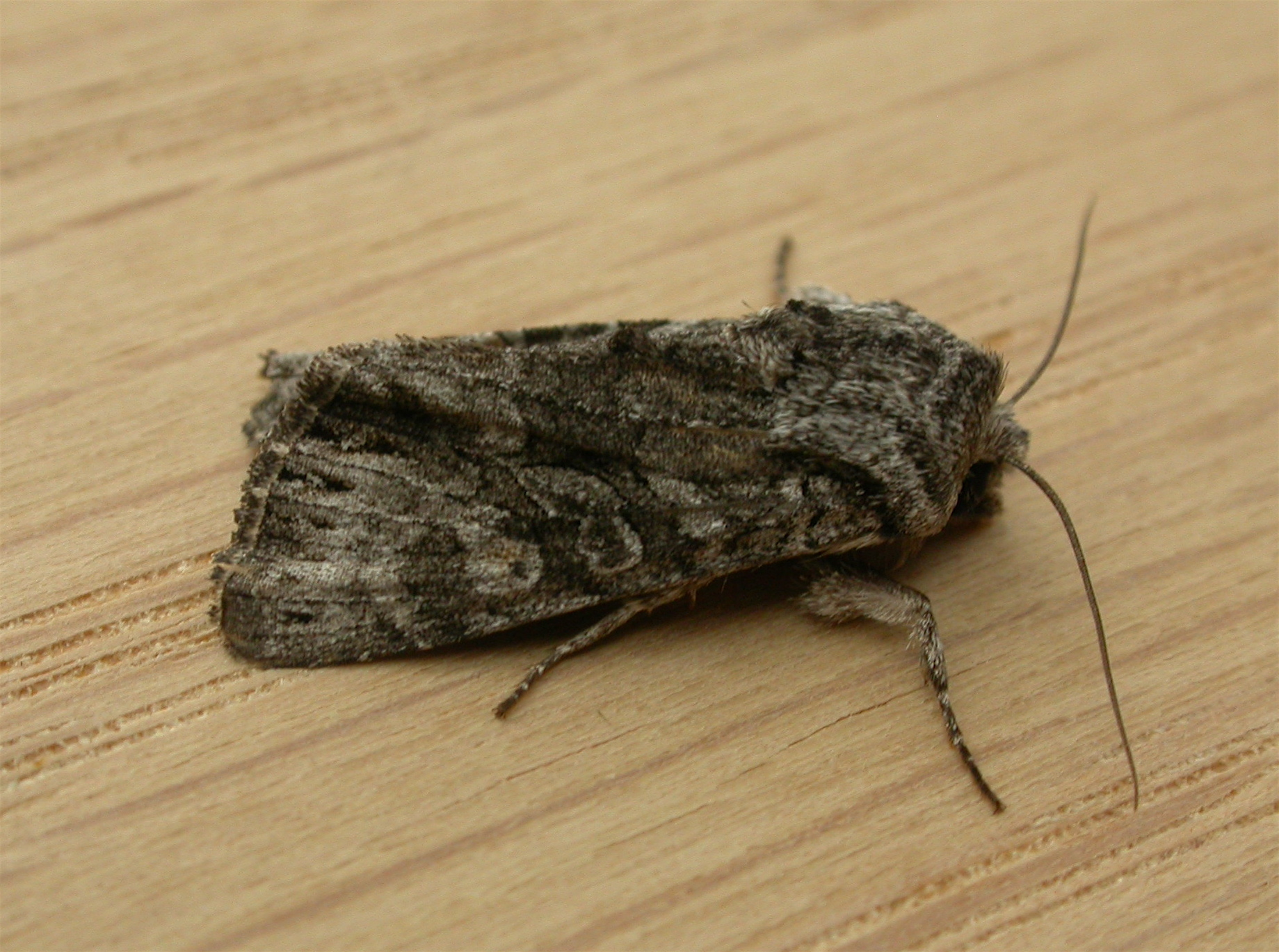

Scientific classification
- Kingdom: Animalia
- Phylum: Arthropoda
- Class: Insecta
- Order: Lepidoptera
- Superfamily: Noctuoidea
- Family: Noctuidae
- Genus: Neumichtis
- Species: N. expulsa

Binomial name
- Neumichtis expulsa Guenée, 1852

Synonyms
- Hadea trijuncta

= Neumichtis expulsa =

Species of moth

Neumichtis expulsa is a moth of the family Noctuidae. It is found in Australia, including Tasmania.

The wingspan is about 30 mm.
