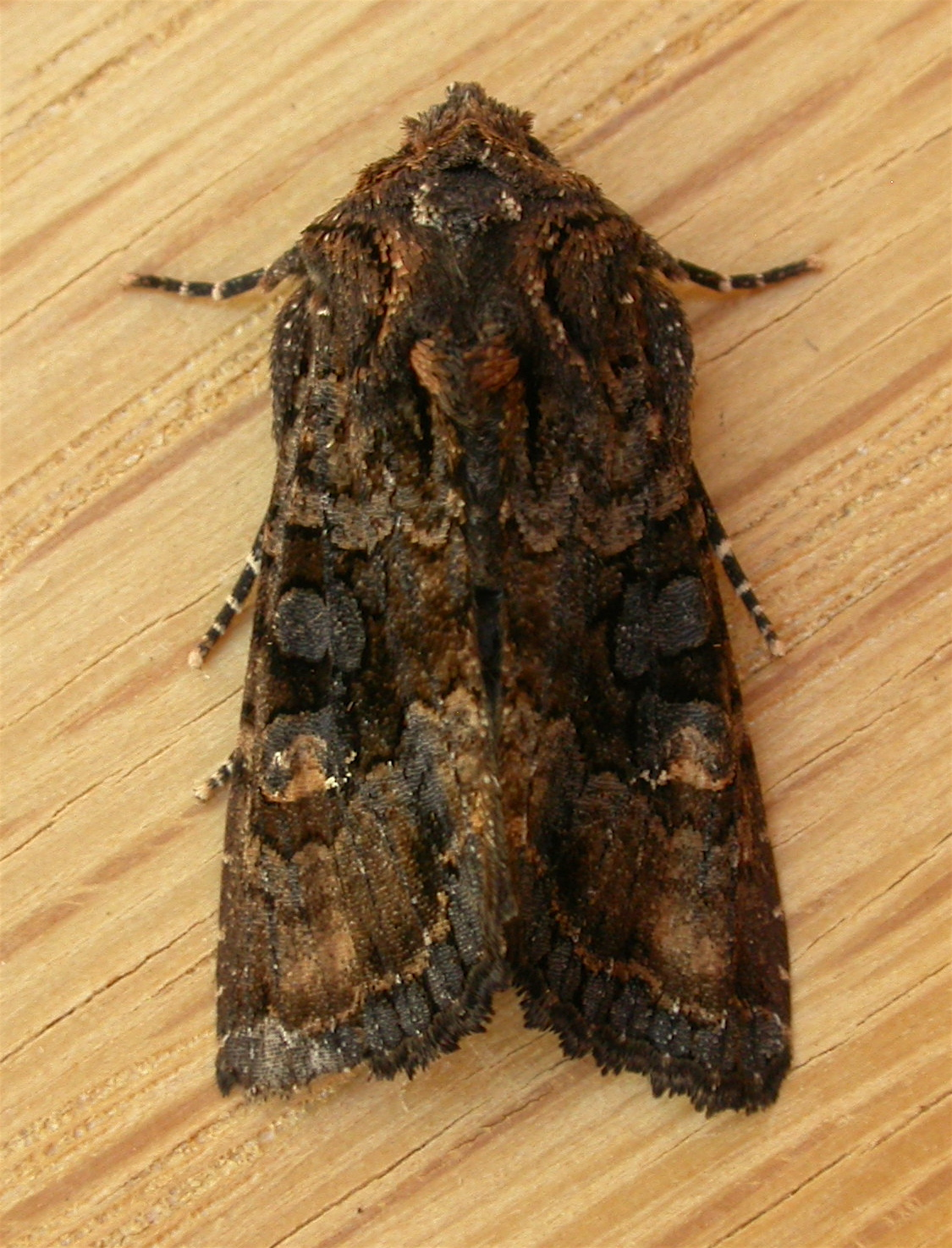

Scientific classification
- Kingdom: Animalia
- Phylum: Arthropoda
- Clade: Pancrustacea
- Class: Insecta
- Order: Lepidoptera
- Superfamily: Noctuoidea
- Family: Noctuidae
- Genus: Neumichtis
- Species: N. archephanes

Binomial name
- Neumichtis archephanes Turner, 1920

= Neumichtis archephanes =

Species of moth

Neumichtis archephanes is a moth of the family Noctuidae. It is found in Australia, including Tasmania. The adult moth of this species has dark brown forewings, each with a complex subtle pattern. The hindwings are plain brown. The wingspan is about 5 cm.
