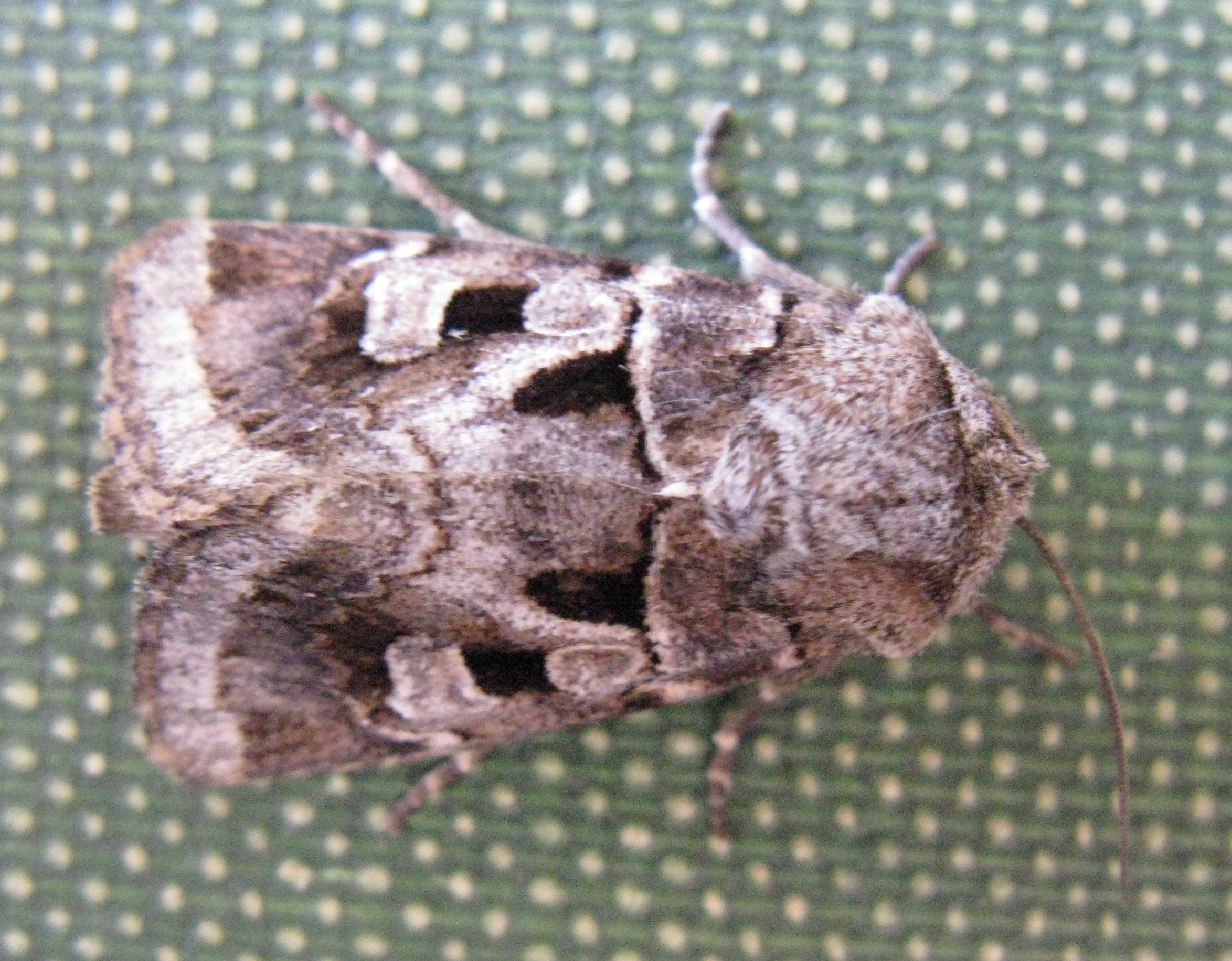
- Neuranethes spodopterodes (Hampson, 1908), comb. nov. Female, dorsal aspect

Scientific classification
- Kingdom: Animalia
- Phylum: Arthropoda
- Clade: Pancrustacea
- Class: Insecta
- Order: Lepidoptera
- Superfamily: Noctuoidea
- Family: Noctuidae
- Genus: Neuranethes
- Species: N. spodopterodes

Binomial name
- Neuranethes spodopterodes (Hampson, 1908)

Synonyms
- Sidemia spodopterodes Hampson 1908

= Neuranethes spodopterodes =

Species of moth

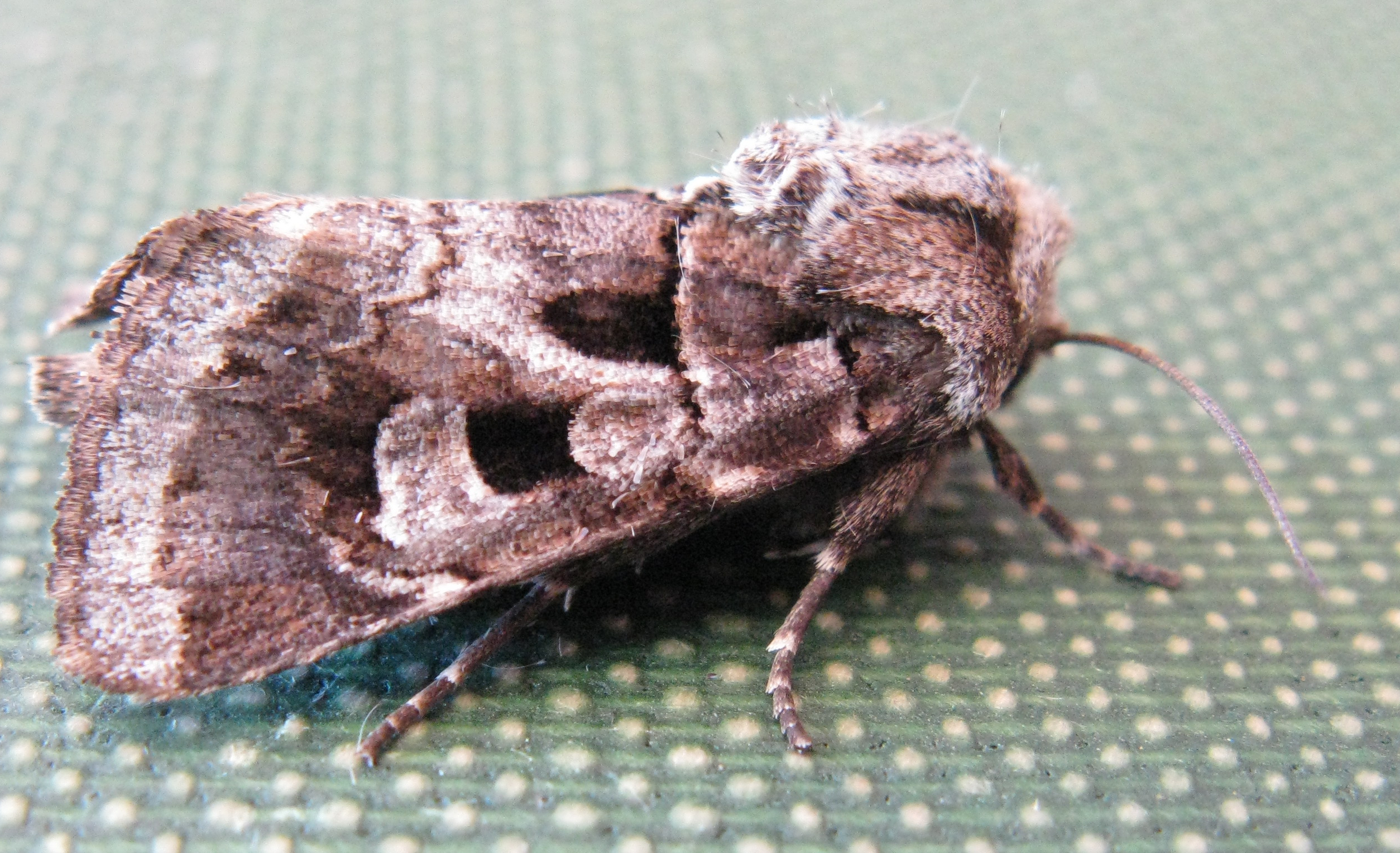
Neuranethes spodopterodes lateral aspect

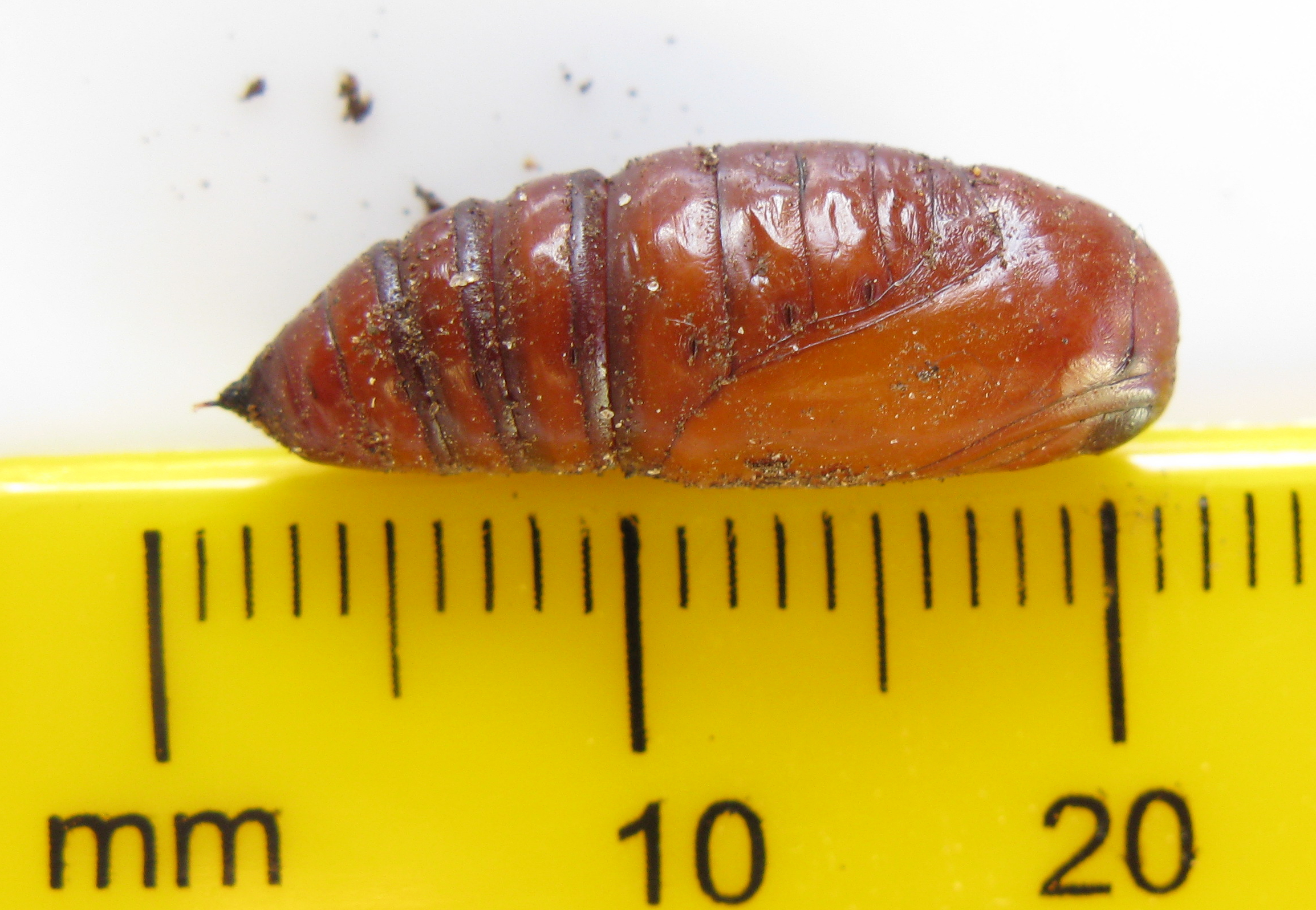
Pupa of Neuranethes spodopterodes

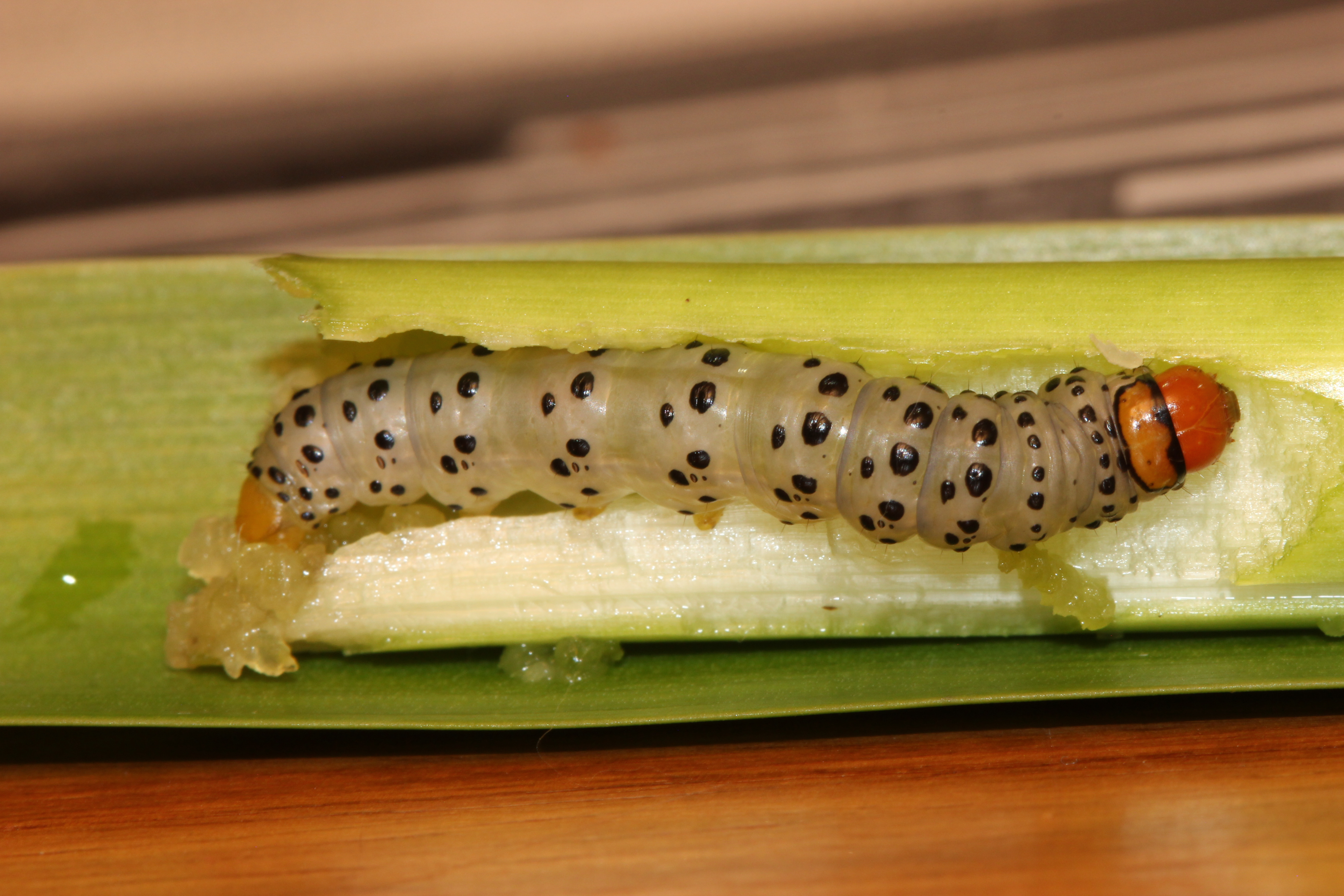
Neuranethes spodopterodes larva in tunnel

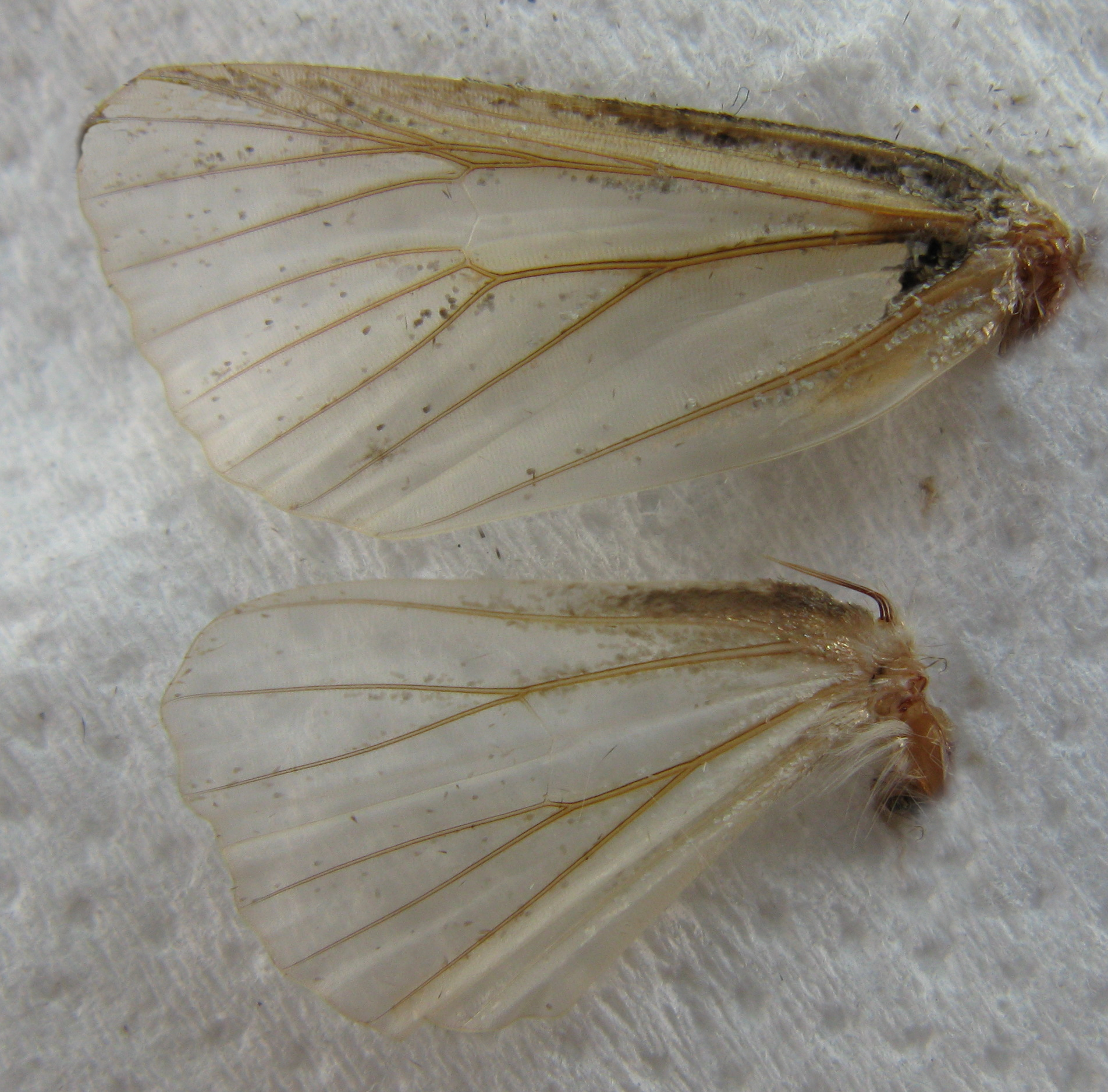
Neuranethes spodopterodes wing venation

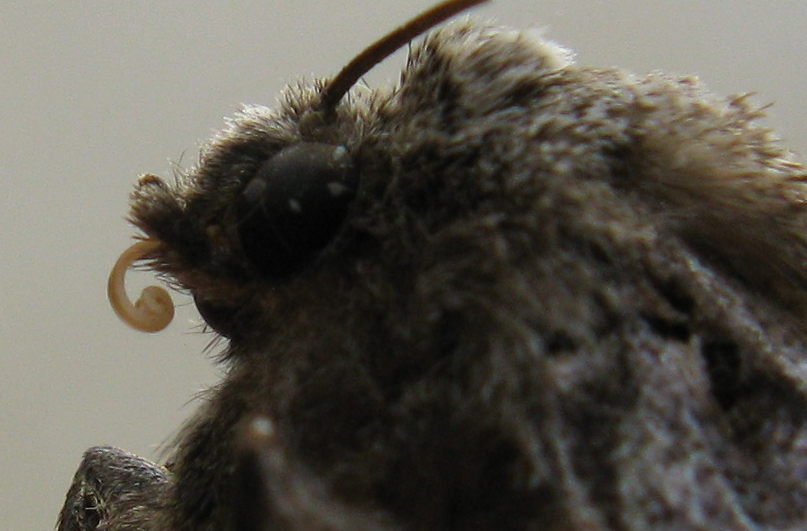
Adult Neuranethes spodopterodes have vestigial mouthparts

Neuranethes spodopterodes is a moth in the family Noctuidae, subfamily Hadeninae.

Although it was described at the start of the 20th century, the moth and its habits were little known. It turns out that the adults have vestigial mouthparts and do not feed before they die, but the larvae fed on species of Agapanthus.

However, although the larvae are voracious feeders, the species seems to have done so little harm as to have escaped notice, presumably because of natural control by parasitoids. Early in the 21st century however, it emerged as a serious horticultural pest of popular species of Agapanthus in regions where neither the moth nor the plants occurred spontaneously.

It seems that the moth had been translocated accidentally in horticultural stock and that the natural enemies had not been imported at the same time. Its very voracity combined with its monophagous feeding habits have however suggested that it might prove to be a valuable biological control of invasive Agapanthus in countries such as New Zealand.
