= Cobubatha megaplaga =

Scientific classification
- Kingdom: Animalia
- Phylum: Arthropoda
- Class: Insecta
- Order: Lepidoptera
- Superfamily: Noctuoidea
- Family: Noctuidae
- Genus: Cobubatha
- Species: C. megaplaga

Binomial name
- Cobubatha megaplaga (Dyar, 1912)

Species of moth

Cobubatha megaplaga is a moth in the family Noctuidae (the owlet moths). It was described by Harrison Gray Dyar Jr. in 1912 and is found in Central and North America.

The MONA or Hodges number for Cobubatha megaplaga is 9019.2.
