= Nagadeba polia =

Scientific classification
- Kingdom: Animalia
- Phylum: Arthropoda
- Clade: Pancrustacea
- Class: Insecta
- Order: Lepidoptera
- Superfamily: Noctuoidea
- Family: Erebidae
- Genus: Nagadeba
- Species: N. polia

Binomial name
- Nagadeba polia Hampson, 1891

Species of moth

Nagadeba polia is a moth of the family Noctuidae first described by George Hampson in 1891. It is found in Sri Lanka.
