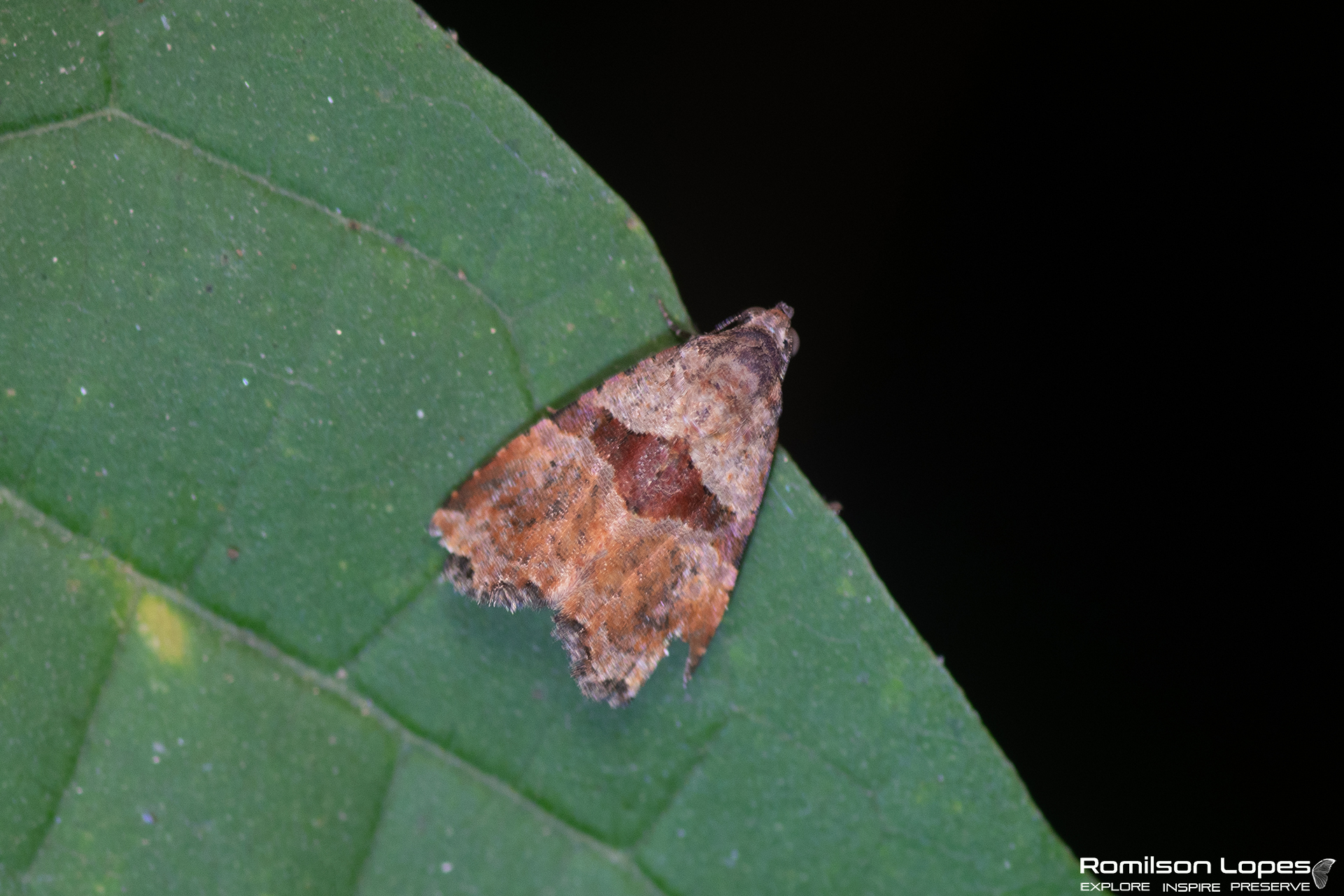

Scientific classification
- Kingdom: Animalia
- Phylum: Arthropoda
- Clade: Pancrustacea
- Class: Insecta
- Order: Lepidoptera
- Superfamily: Noctuoidea
- Family: Noctuidae
- Genus: Cobubatha
- Species: C. metaspilaris

Binomial name
- Cobubatha metaspilaris (Walker, 1863)

Synonyms
- Erastria minima Herrich-Schäffer, 1868; Agrophila signiferana Walker, 1865; Cobubatha punctifinis Hampson, 1910

= Cobubatha metaspilaris =

Species of moth

Cobubatha metaspilaris is a moth of the family Noctuidae, described by Francis Walker in 1863. It is found in the southern United States (from Florida to Texas), British Virgin Islands and Cuba.

Its wingspan is about 14 mm.
