= Neophaenis boucheri =

Scientific classification
- Domain: Eukaryota
- Kingdom: Animalia
- Phylum: Arthropoda
- Class: Insecta
- Order: Lepidoptera
- Superfamily: Noctuoidea
- Family: Noctuidae
- Tribe: Dypterygiini
- Genus: Neophaenis
- Species: N. boucheri

Binomial name
- Neophaenis boucheri Barbut & Lalanne-Cassou, 2004

Species of moth

Neophaenis boucheri is a species of cutworm or dart moth in the family Noctuidae. It is found in North America.

The MONA or Hodges number for Neophaenis boucheri is 9628.
