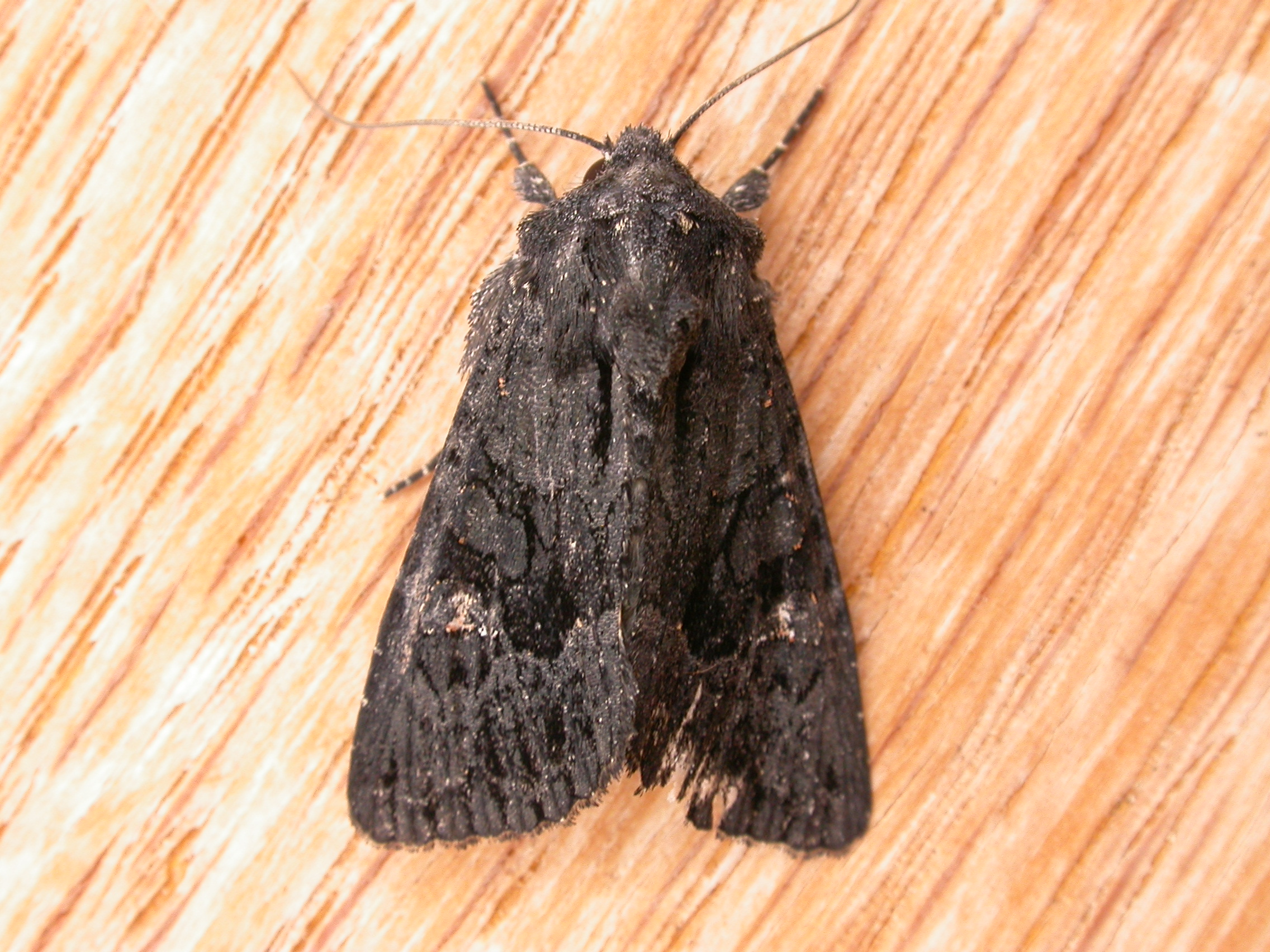

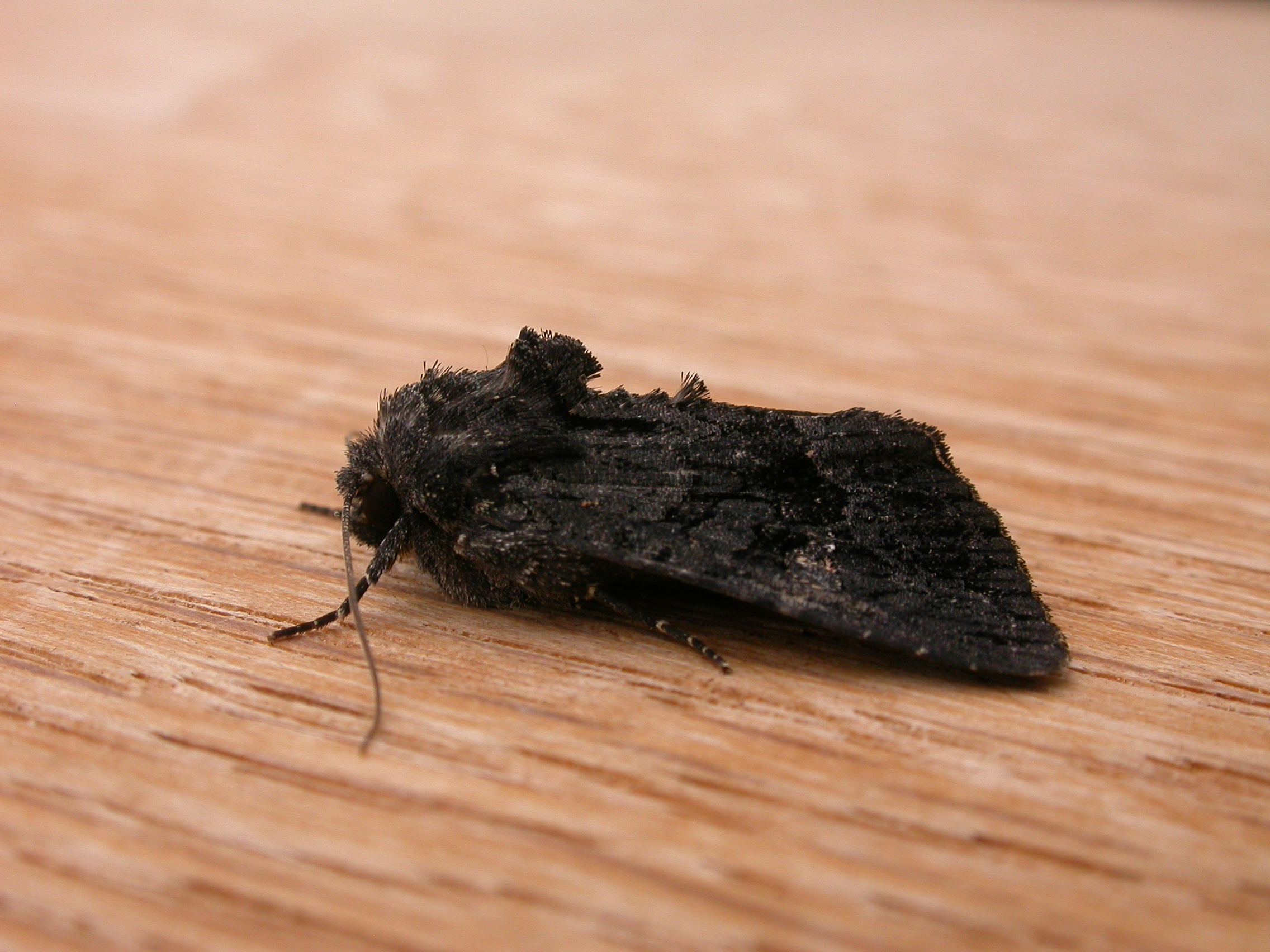

Scientific classification
- Kingdom: Animalia
- Phylum: Arthropoda
- Class: Insecta
- Order: Lepidoptera
- Superfamily: Noctuoidea
- Family: Noctuidae
- Genus: Neumichtis
- Species: N. nigerrima

Binomial name
- Neumichtis nigerrima (Guenée, 1852)

Synonyms
- Mamestra nigerrima Guenée, 1852; Hadena extima Walker, 1857; Mamestra insignata Walker, 1857; Hadena dilucesceus T.P. Lucas, 1895; Euplexia asbolodes Turner, 1911

= Neumichtis nigerrima =

Species of moth

Neumichtis nigerrima (the black noctuid) is a moth of the family Noctuidae. It is known from the Australian Capital Territory, New South Wales, Queensland, South Australia, Tasmania, Victoria and Western Australia.

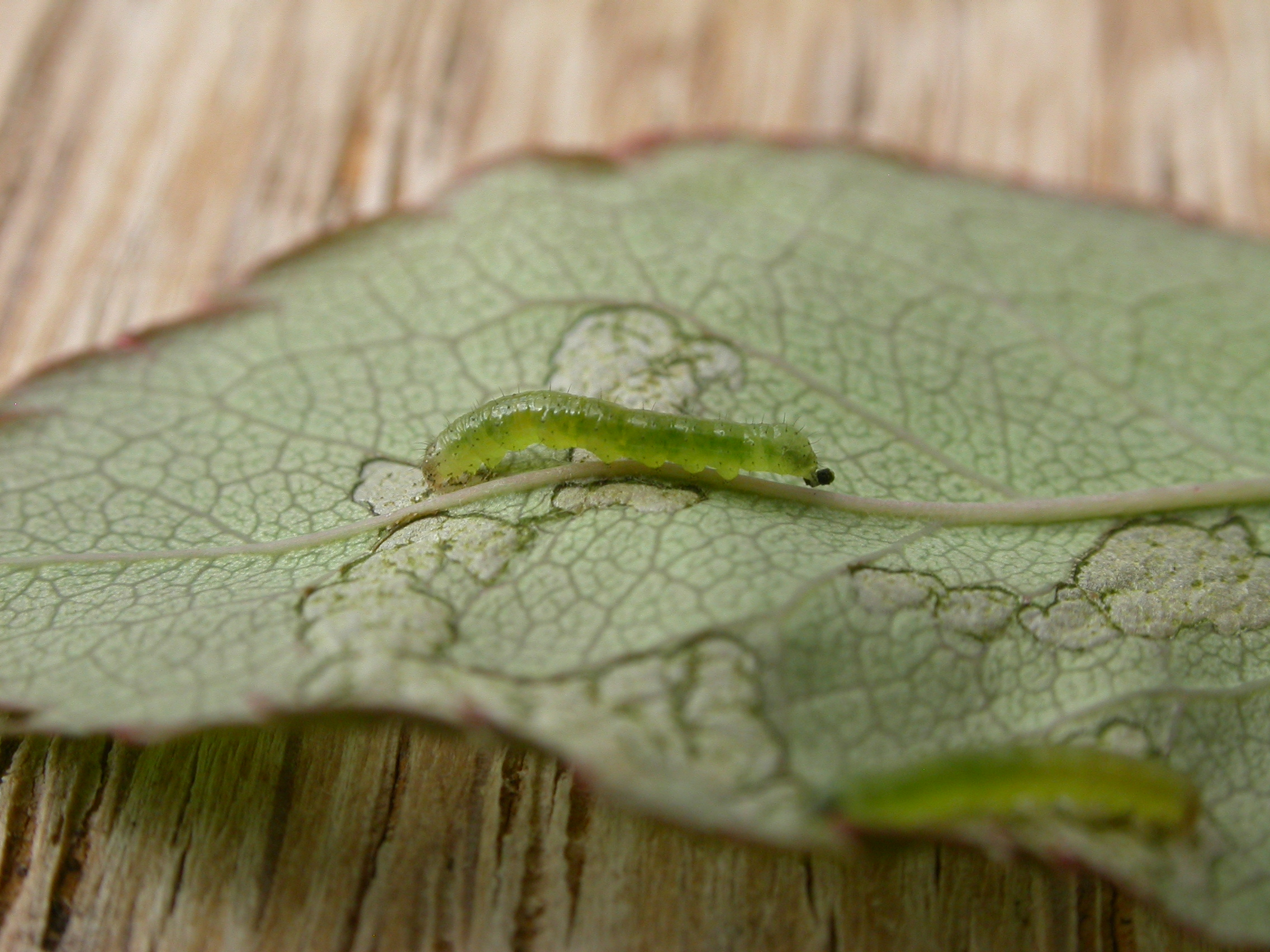
Larva

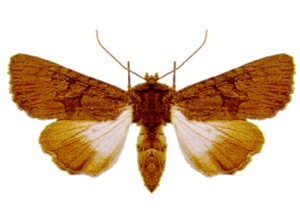
Mounted

The wingspan is about 40 mm.

Larvae have been recorded as feeding on Saccharum, Solanum tuberosum, Beta vulgaris, Brassica rapa, Trifolium, Petrorhagia and Mentha.
