= Nephelodes demaculata =

Scientific classification
- Domain: Eukaryota
- Kingdom: Animalia
- Phylum: Arthropoda
- Class: Insecta
- Order: Lepidoptera
- Superfamily: Noctuoidea
- Family: Noctuidae
- Genus: Nephelodes
- Species: N. demaculata

Binomial name
- Nephelodes demaculata Barnes & McDunnough, 1918

Species of moth

Nephelodes demaculata is a species of cutworm or dart moth in the family Noctuidae first described by William Barnes and James Halliday McDunnough in 1918. It is found in North America.

The MONA or Hodges number for Nephelodes demaculata is 10525.
