= Cobubatha ochrocraspis =

Scientific classification
- Kingdom: Animalia
- Phylum: Arthropoda
- Clade: Pancrustacea
- Class: Insecta
- Order: Lepidoptera
- Superfamily: Noctuoidea
- Family: Noctuidae
- Genus: Cobubatha
- Species: C. ochrocraspis

Binomial name
- Cobubatha ochrocraspis Hampson, 1910

Species of moth

Cobubatha ochrocraspis is a species of moth in the family Noctuidae (the owlet moths). It is found in North America.

The MONA or Hodges number for Cobubatha ochrocraspis is 9012.1.
