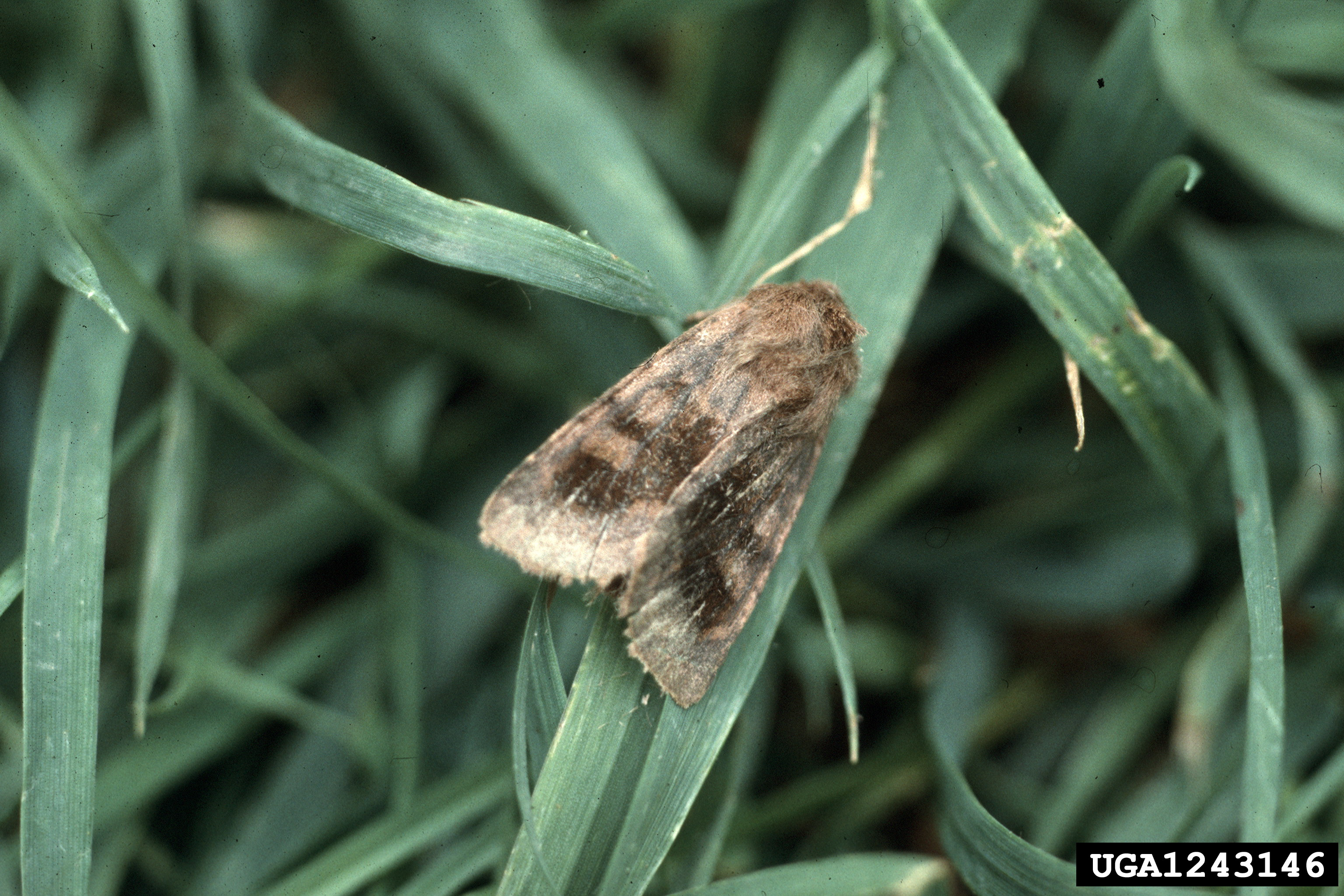

Scientific classification
- Kingdom: Animalia
- Phylum: Arthropoda
- Clade: Pancrustacea
- Class: Insecta
- Order: Lepidoptera
- Superfamily: Noctuoidea
- Family: Noctuidae
- Genus: Nephelodes
- Species: N. minians

Binomial name
- Nephelodes minians Guenée, 1852

Synonyms
- Nephelodes violans; Nephelodes rubeolans; Graphiphora subdolens; Graphiphora expansa; Monosca subnotata

= Nephelodes minians =

Species of moth

Nephelodes minians, the bronzed cutworm or shaded umber moth, is a moth of the family Noctuidae. It is found in most of North America, except Florida and adjacent states.

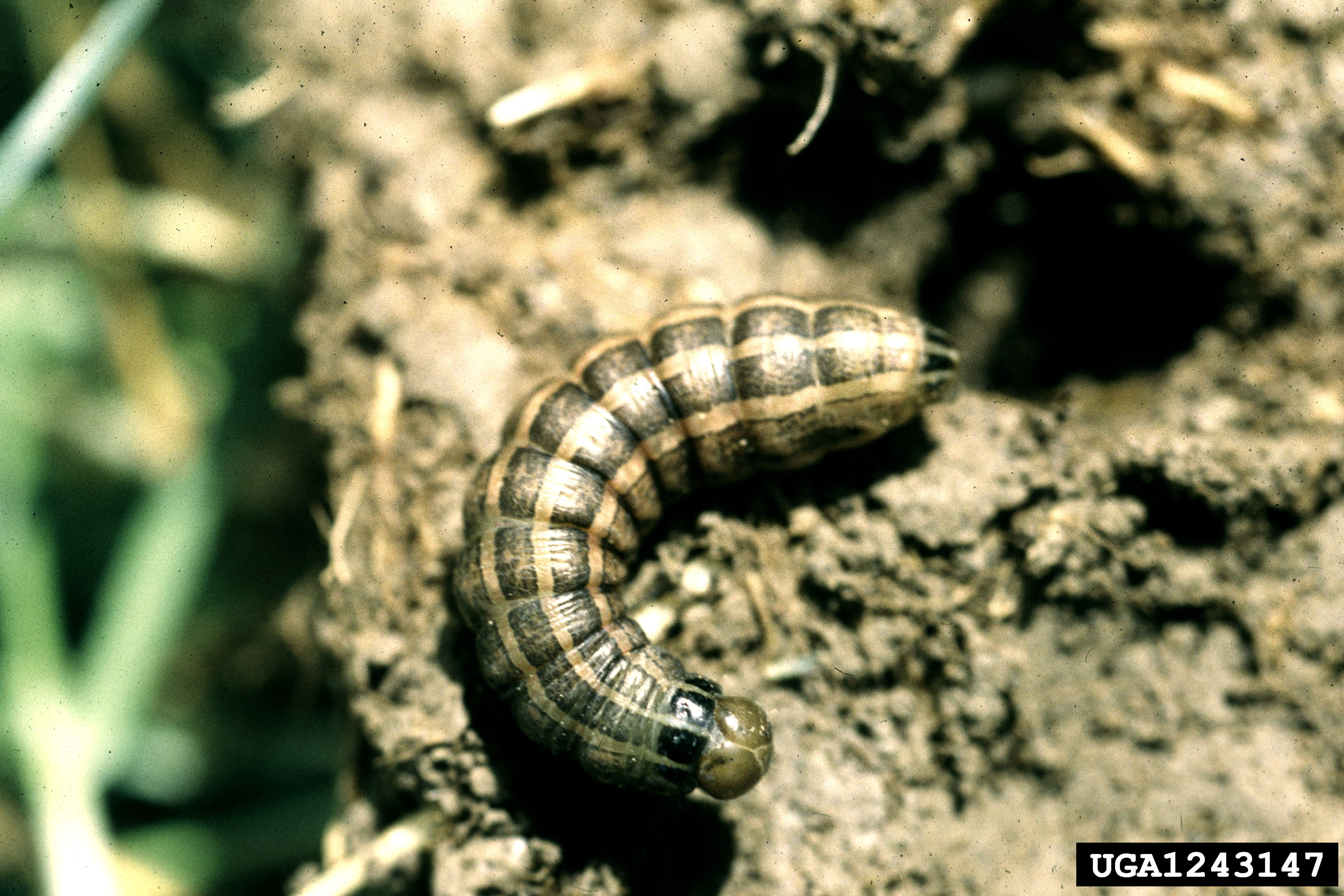
Caterpillar

This wingspan is about 40 mm. The moth flies from July to October depending on the location.

The larva feeds on various grasses, including cereal crops and corn.

== Subspecies ==
There are three recognised subspecies:

- Nephelodes minians minians
- Nephelodes minians tertialis
- Nephelodes minians pectinata
