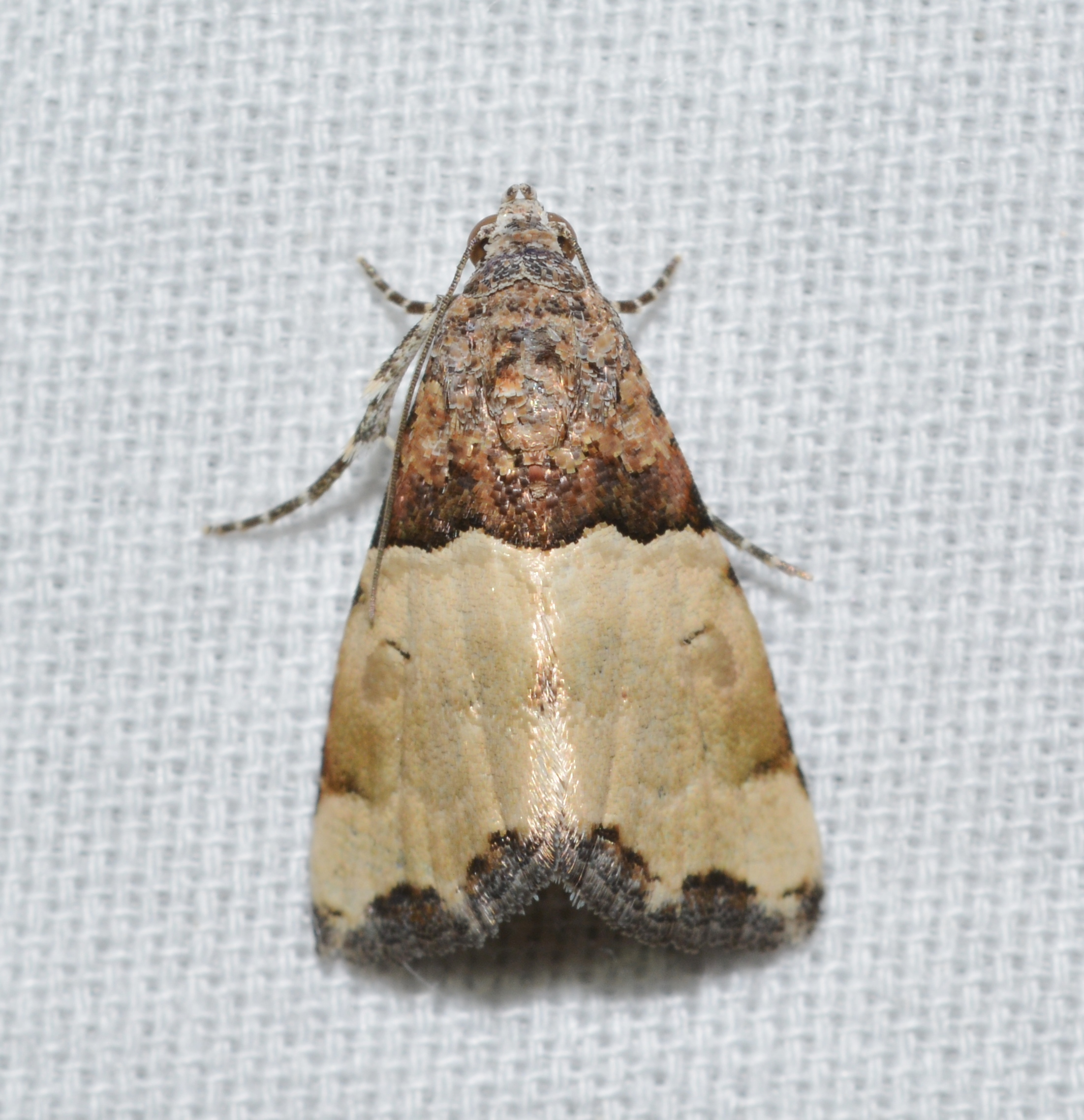

Scientific classification
- Kingdom: Animalia
- Phylum: Arthropoda
- Class: Insecta
- Order: Lepidoptera
- Superfamily: Noctuoidea
- Family: Noctuidae
- Genus: Cobubatha
- Species: C. dividua

Binomial name
- Cobubatha dividua (Grote, 1879)

= Cobubatha dividua =

Species of moth

Cobubatha dividua is a species of moth in the family Noctuidae (the owlet moths). It is found in North America.

The MONA or Hodges number for Cobubatha dividua is 9018.
