= Nephelodes carminata =

Scientific classification
- Domain: Eukaryota
- Kingdom: Animalia
- Phylum: Arthropoda
- Class: Insecta
- Order: Lepidoptera
- Superfamily: Noctuoidea
- Family: Noctuidae
- Tribe: Tholerini
- Genus: Nephelodes
- Species: N. carminata

Binomial name
- Nephelodes carminata (Smith, 1890)

Species of moth

Nephelodes carminata is a species of cutworm or dart moth in the family Noctuidae. It is found in North America.

The MONA or Hodges number for Nephelodes carminata is 10528.
