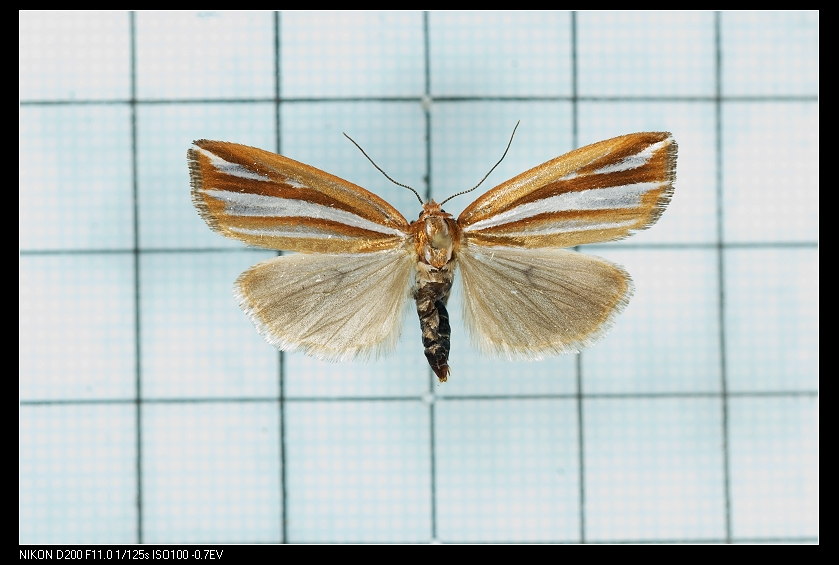

Scientific classification
- Kingdom: Animalia
- Phylum: Arthropoda
- Clade: Pancrustacea
- Class: Insecta
- Order: Lepidoptera
- Superfamily: Noctuoidea
- Family: Noctuidae
- Genus: Narangodes
- Species: N. argyrostrigatus

Binomial name
- Narangodes argyrostrigatus Sugi, 1990

= Narangodes argyrostrigatus =

Species of moth

Narangodes argyrostrigatus is a moth of the family Noctuidae. It is found in Taiwan.
