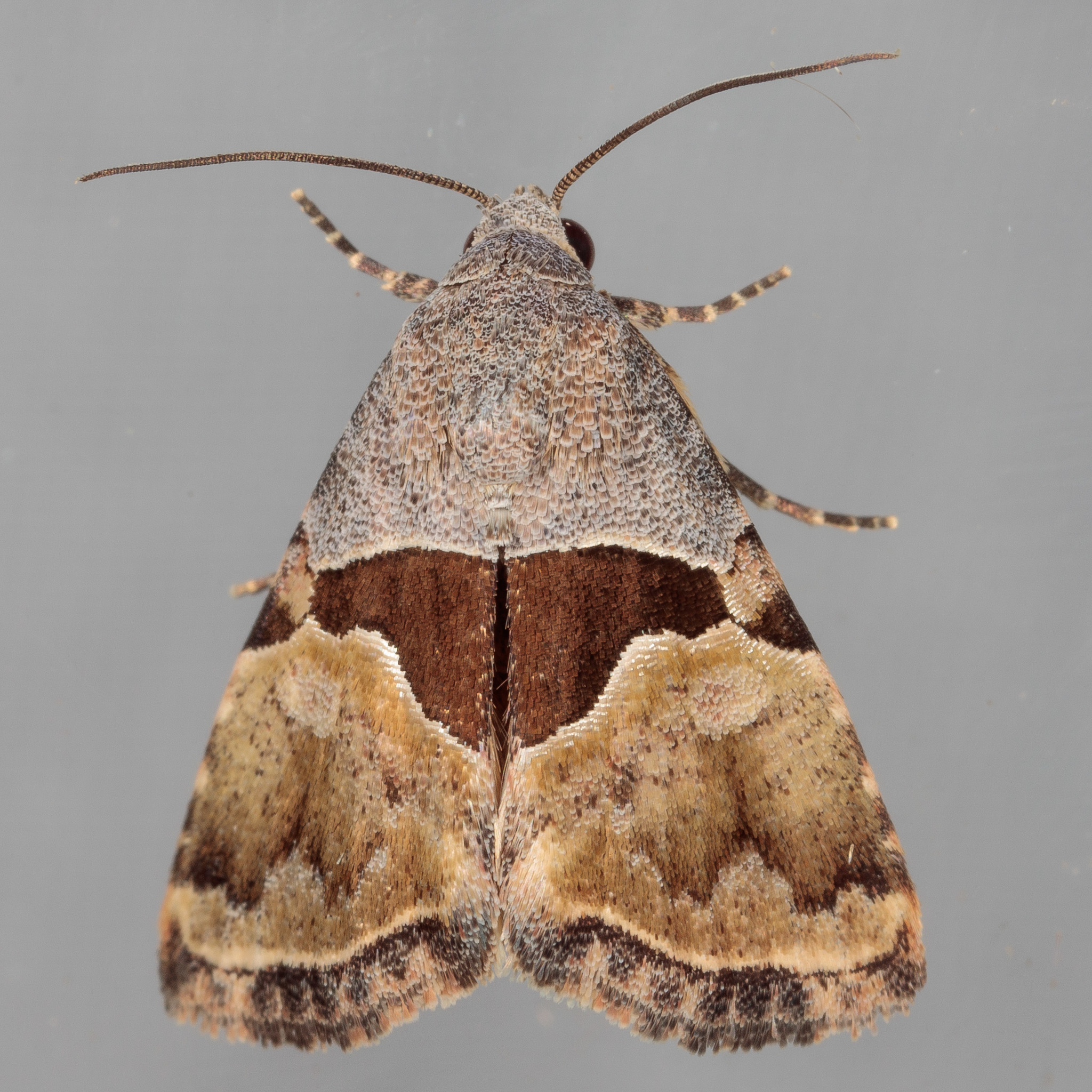

Scientific classification
- Kingdom: Animalia
- Phylum: Arthropoda
- Class: Insecta
- Order: Lepidoptera
- Superfamily: Noctuoidea
- Family: Noctuidae
- Genus: Cobubatha
- Species: C. lixiva

Binomial name
- Cobubatha lixiva (Grote, 1882)

Synonyms
- Cobubatha basicinerea (Grote, 1882); Cobubatha lixinites (Dyar, 1912)

= Cobubatha lixiva =

Species of moth

Cobubatha lixiva is a species of moth in the family Noctuidae (the owlet moths).
