= Cobubatha numa =

Scientific classification
- Kingdom: Animalia
- Phylum: Arthropoda
- Class: Insecta
- Order: Lepidoptera
- Superfamily: Noctuoidea
- Family: Noctuidae
- Genus: Cobubatha
- Species: C. numa

Binomial name
- Cobubatha numa (H. Druce, 1889)

Species of moth

Cobubatha numa is a species of moth in the family Noctuidae (the owlet moths). It is found in North America.

The MONA or Hodges number for Cobubatha numa is 9013.
