= Cobubatha orthozona =

Scientific classification
- Kingdom: Animalia
- Phylum: Arthropoda
- Class: Insecta
- Order: Lepidoptera
- Superfamily: Noctuoidea
- Family: Noctuidae
- Genus: Cobubatha
- Species: C. orthozona

Binomial name
- Cobubatha orthozona (Hampson, 1910)

Synonyms
- Cobubatha antonita (Dyar, 1911); Cobubatha victrix (Dyar, 1912)

Species of moth

Cobubatha orthozona is a species of moth in the family Noctuidae (the owlet moths).

The MONA or Hodges number for Cobubatha orthozona is 9017.
