= Neachrostia undulata =

Scientific classification
- Kingdom: Animalia
- Phylum: Arthropoda
- Class: Insecta
- Order: Lepidoptera
- Superfamily: Noctuoidea
- Family: Erebidae
- Genus: Neachrostia
- Species: N. undulata

Binomial name
- Neachrostia undulata Hampson, 1893

Species of moth

Neachrostia undulata is a moth of the family Erebidae first described by George Hampson in 1893. It is found in Sri Lanka and China.
