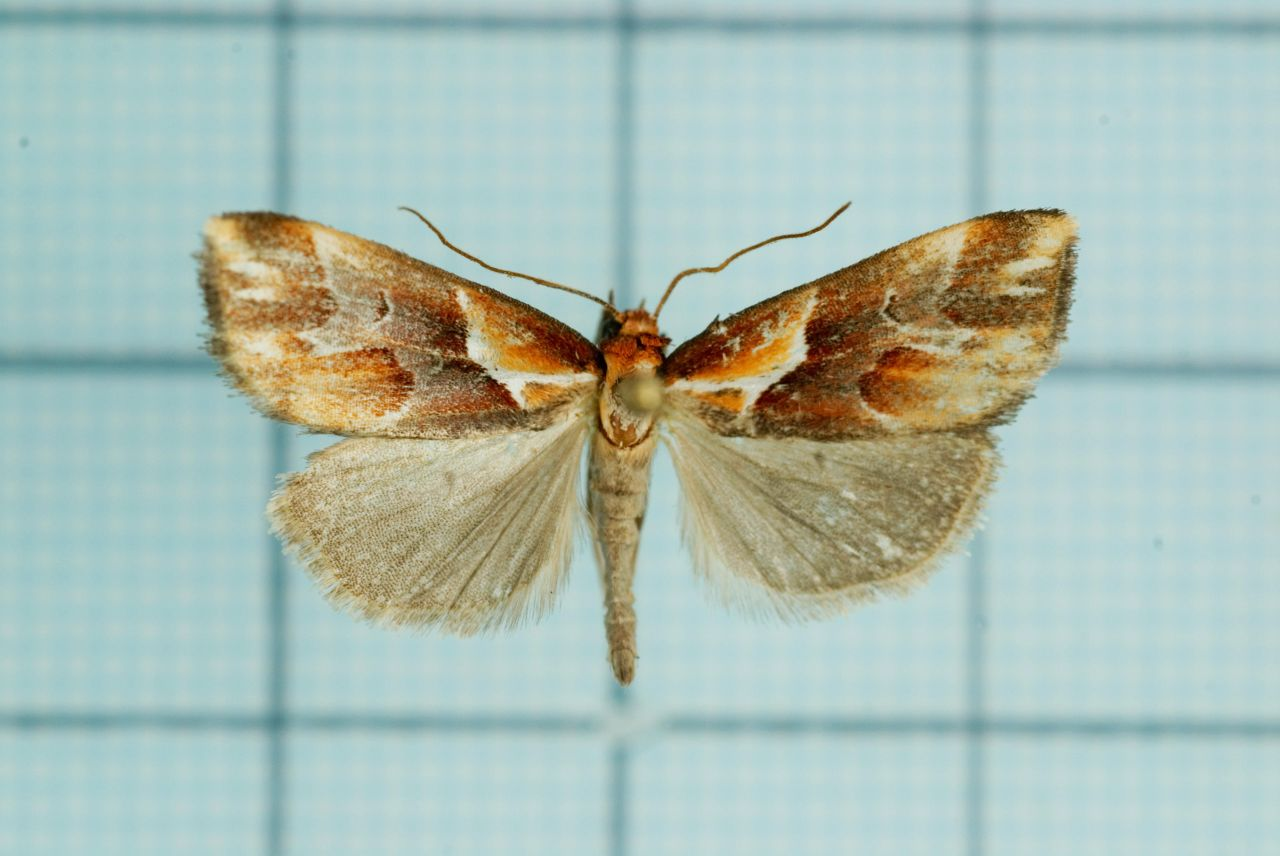

Scientific classification
- Kingdom: Animalia
- Phylum: Arthropoda
- Clade: Pancrustacea
- Class: Insecta
- Order: Lepidoptera
- Superfamily: Noctuoidea
- Family: Noctuidae
- Genus: Narangodes
- Species: N. confluens

Binomial name
- Narangodes confluens Sugi, 1990

= Narangodes confluens =

Species of moth

Narangodes confluens is a moth in the family Noctuidae first described by Shigero Sugi in 1990. It is found in Taiwan.
