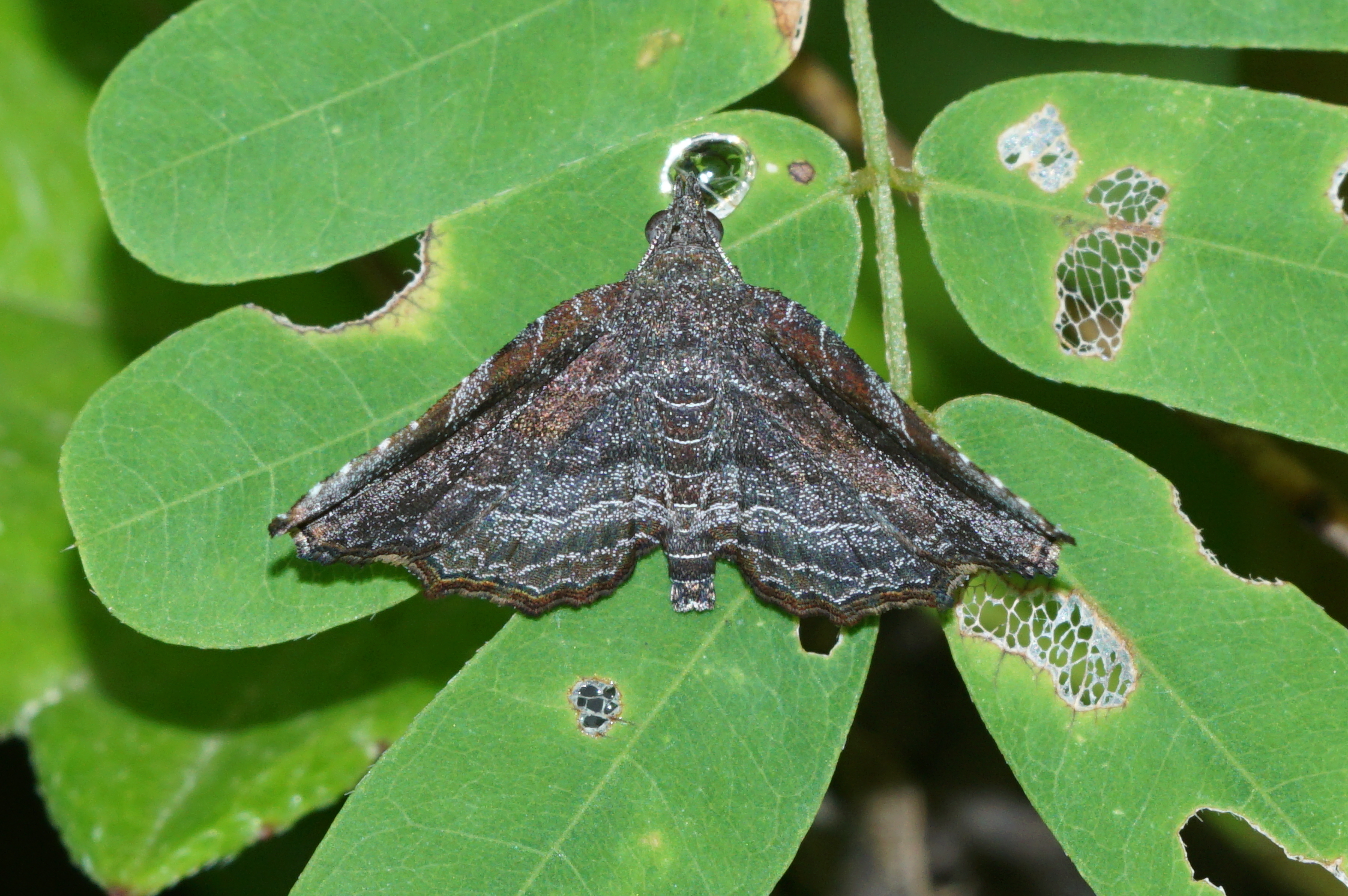

Scientific classification
- Kingdom: Animalia
- Phylum: Arthropoda
- Clade: Pancrustacea
- Class: Insecta
- Order: Lepidoptera
- Superfamily: Noctuoidea
- Family: Erebidae
- Genus: Nagadeba
- Species: N. indecoralis

Binomial name
- Nagadeba indecoralis Walker, 1865

= Nagadeba indecoralis =

Species of moth

Nagadeba indecoralis is a moth of the family Noctuidae first described by Francis Walker in 1865. It is found in Sri Lanka, Java, India, Myanmar, India's Andaman Islands, Japan and Taiwan.
