= Cobubatha hippotes =

Scientific classification
- Domain: Eukaryota
- Kingdom: Animalia
- Phylum: Arthropoda
- Class: Insecta
- Order: Lepidoptera
- Superfamily: Noctuoidea
- Family: Noctuidae
- Genus: Cobubatha
- Species: C. hippotes

Binomial name
- Cobubatha hippotes (H. Druce, 1889)

Species of moth

Cobubatha hippotes is a species of moth in the family Noctuidae (the owlet moths). It is found in North America.

The MONA or Hodges number for Cobubatha hippotes is 9019.
