= Neachrostia =

Scientific classification
- Kingdom: Animalia
- Phylum: Arthropoda
- Class: Insecta
- Order: Lepidoptera
- Superfamily: Noctuoidea
- Family: Erebidae
- Subfamily: Calpinae
- Genus: Neachrostia; Hampson, 1907

Genus of moths

Neachrostia is a genus of moths of the family Erebidae. The genus was erected by George Hampson in 1907.

== Species ==
- Neachrostia brunneiplaga Swinhoe, 1905
- Neachrostia diapera Hampson, 1926
- Neachrostia hypomelas Hampson, 1895
- Neachrostia inconstans Moore, 1888
- Neachrostia nigripunctalis Wileman, 1911
- Neachrostia undulata Hampson, 1893
