= Nicetas (moth) =

Scientific classification
- Domain: Eukaryota
- Kingdom: Animalia
- Phylum: Arthropoda
- Class: Insecta
- Order: Lepidoptera
- Superfamily: Noctuoidea
- Family: Erebidae
- Subfamily: Herminiinae
- Genus: Nicetas; H. Druce in Godman & Salvin, 1891

Genus of moths

Nicetas is a genus of moths of the family Erebidae. The genus was erected by Herbert Druce in 1891.

== Species ==
- Nicetas annon H. Druce, 1891 Mexico
- Nicetas antonialis Schaus, 1916 Jamaica
- Nicetas bathalis Schaus, 1916 Jamaica
- Nicetas biciliata (Warren, 1889) Brazil (Amazonas)
- Nicetas lycon H. Druce, 1891 Panama
- Nicetas panamensis H. Druce, 1891 Costa Rica, Panama
