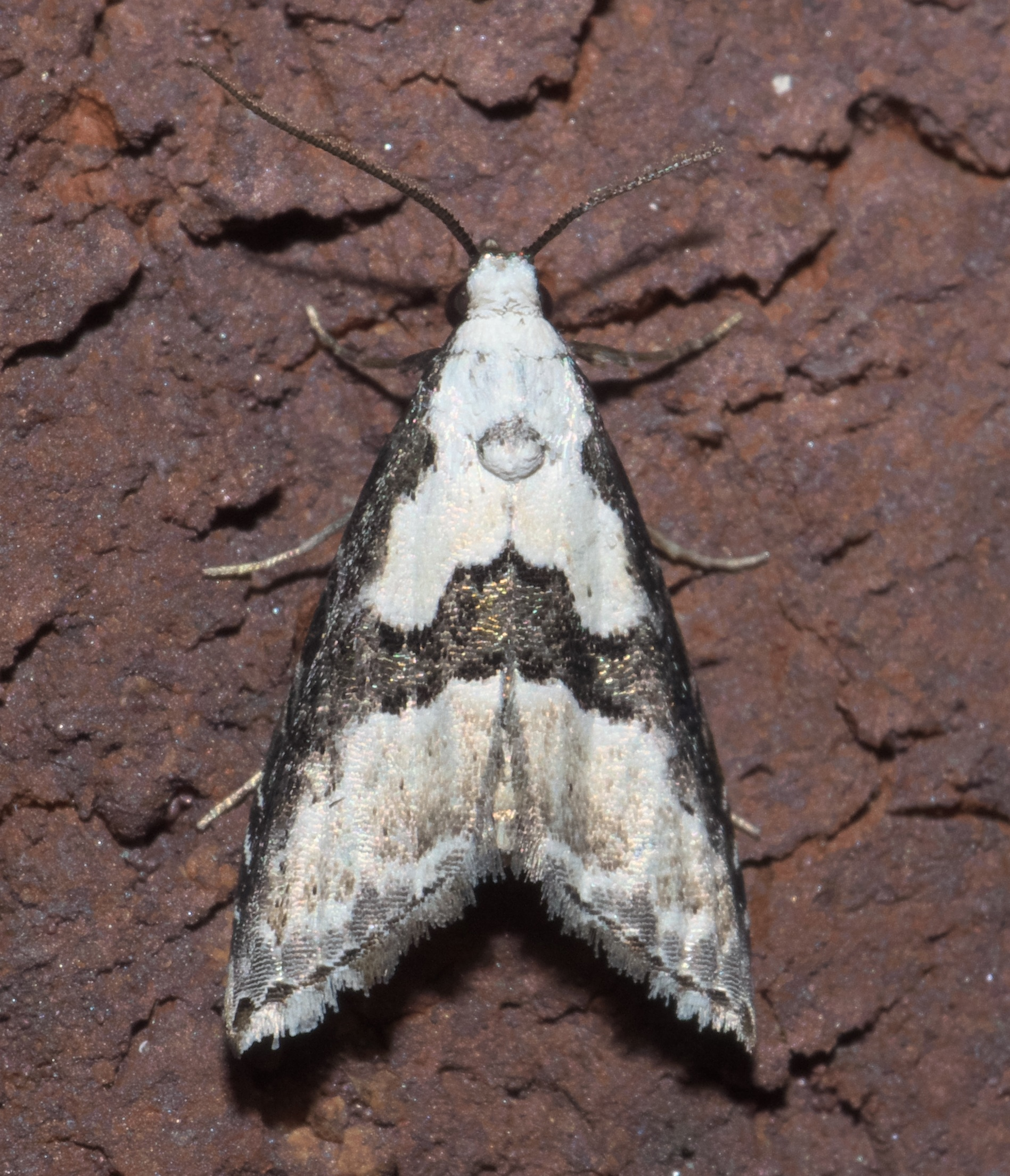

Scientific classification
- Kingdom: Animalia
- Phylum: Arthropoda
- Clade: Pancrustacea
- Class: Insecta
- Order: Lepidoptera
- Superfamily: Noctuoidea
- Family: Erebidae
- Genus: Nigetia; Walker, [1866]
- Species: N. formosalis

Binomial name
- Nigetia formosalis Walker, [1866]

Synonyms
- Nola melanopa Zeller, 1872

= Nigetia =

Genus of moths

Nigetia is a monotypic genus of moths in the family Erebidae. Its only species, Nigetia formosalis, the thin-winged algibelle or thin-winged owlet moth, has a scattered distribution in eastern North America from Ontario to Connecticut, south to Florida and Texas. Both the genus and the species were first described by Francis Walker in 1866.

The wingspan is about 19 mm. There is one generation in the northern parts and two or more in the southern parts of its range.

Larvae have been reared on Protococcus species but probably also feed on lichens.

== Taxonomy ==
The genus was previously classified in the subfamily Acontiinae of the family Noctuidae.
