= Neopangrapta =

Scientific classification
- Kingdom: Animalia
- Phylum: Arthropoda
- Class: Insecta
- Order: Lepidoptera
- Superfamily: Noctuoidea
- Family: Erebidae
- Subfamily: Calpinae
- Genus: Neopangrapta; Hampson, 1926
- Species: N. stenothyris

Binomial name
- Neopangrapta stenothyris Hampson, 1926

Genus of moths

Neopangrapta is a monotypic moth genus of the family Erebidae. Its only species, Neopangrapta stenothyris, is found in Belize. Both the genus and species were first described by George Hampson in 1926.
