= Neopalthis =

Scientific classification
- Domain: Eukaryota
- Kingdom: Animalia
- Phylum: Arthropoda
- Class: Insecta
- Order: Lepidoptera
- Superfamily: Noctuoidea
- Family: Erebidae
- Subfamily: Herminiinae
- Genus: Neopalthis; H. Druce in Godman & Salvin, 1891
- Species: N. madates

Binomial name
- Neopalthis madates H. Druce, 1891

Genus of moths

Neopalthis is a monotypic moth genus of the family Erebidae. Its only species, Neopalthis madates, is known from Mexico and Panama. Both the genus and the species were first described by Herbert Druce in 1891.
