= Sinocharis =

Scientific classification
- Kingdom: Animalia
- Phylum: Arthropoda
- Class: Insecta
- Order: Lepidoptera
- Superfamily: Noctuoidea
- Family: Noctuidae
- Subfamily: Acontiinae
- Genus: Sinocharis; Püngeler in Korb, 1912
- Species: S. korbae

Binomial name
- Sinocharis korbae Püngeler, 1912

Synonyms
- Generic: Noshimea Matsumura, 1931; Specific: Noshimea fulgularis Matsumura, 1931

Genus of moths

Sinocharis is a monotypic moth genus of the family Noctuidae. Its only species, Sinocharis korbae, is found in south-eastern Siberia and Japan. Both the genus and species were first described by Püngeler in 1912.
