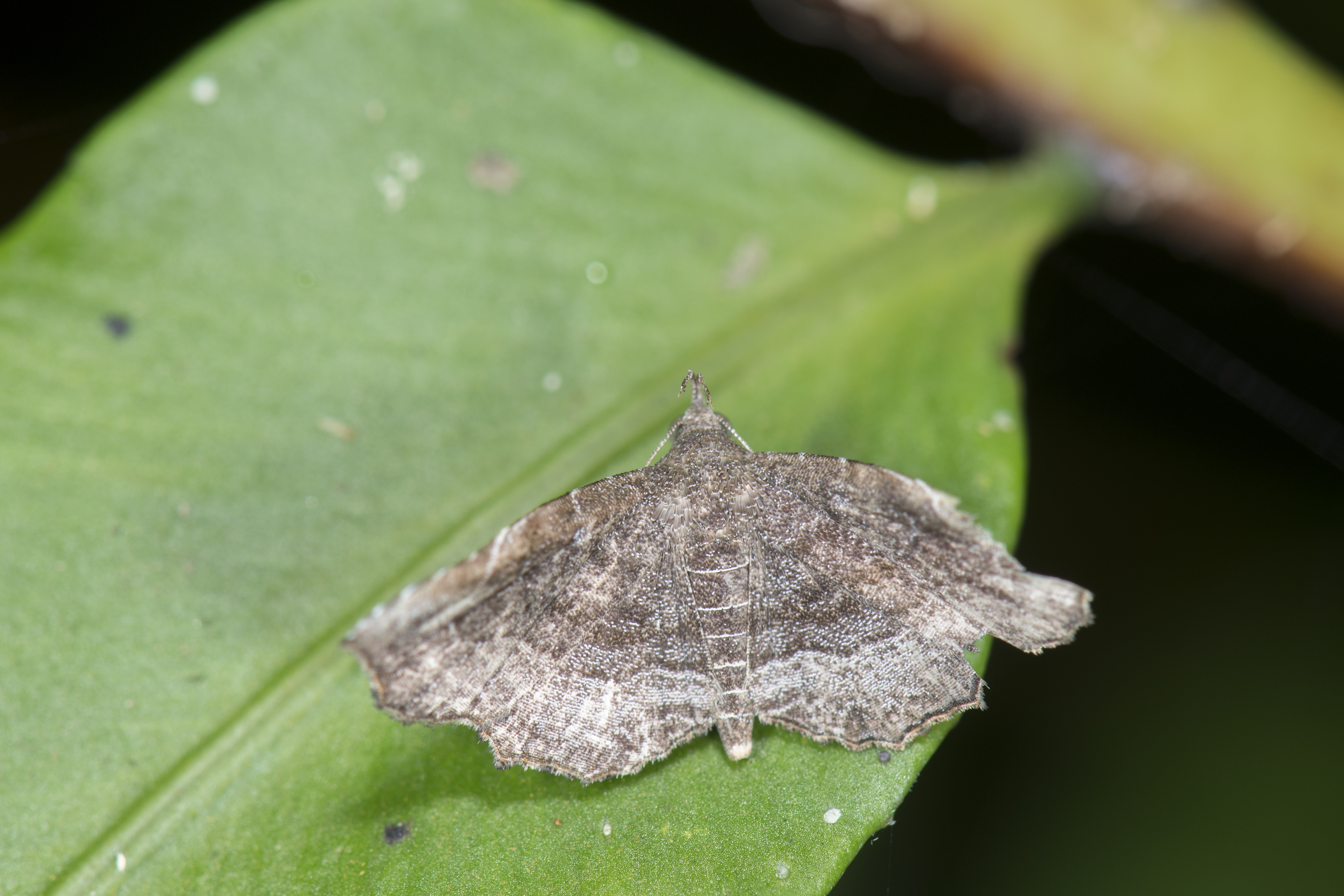

Scientific classification
- Kingdom: Animalia
- Phylum: Arthropoda
- Class: Insecta
- Order: Lepidoptera
- Superfamily: Noctuoidea
- Family: Erebidae
- Subfamily: Calpinae
- Genus: Nagadeba; Walker, 1866

= Nagadeba =

Genus of moths

Nagadeba is a genus of moths of the family Noctuidae first described by Francis Walker in 1866.

== Description ==
Palpi very long and slender. Second joint reaching far above vertex of head. Third joint long with a tuft of hair on inner side. Antennae minutely ciliated. Thorax and abdomen smoothly scaled. Tibia naked. Forewings with acute apex. The outer margin angled at middle. Hindwings with produced outer margin to points at veins 4 and 7. Cilia crenulate. Vein 5 from middle of discocellulars.

== Species ==
- Nagadeba indecoralis Walker, 1865
- Nagadeba polia (Hampson, 1891)
