= Narulla =

Scientific classification
- Kingdom: Animalia
- Phylum: Arthropoda
- Class: Insecta
- Order: Lepidoptera
- Superfamily: Noctuoidea
- Family: Erebidae
- Subfamily: Calpinae
- Genus: Narulla; Walker, 1861
- Species: N. infixaria

Binomial name
- Narulla infixaria Walker, 1862

Genus of moths

Narulla is a monotypic moth genus of the family Erebidae. Its only species, Narulla infixaria, is found in Venezuela. Both the genus and species were first described by Francis Walker, the genus in 1861 and the species a year later in 1862.
