= Niaccabana =

Scientific classification
- Domain: Eukaryota
- Kingdom: Animalia
- Phylum: Arthropoda
- Class: Insecta
- Order: Lepidoptera
- Superfamily: Noctuoidea
- Family: Erebidae
- Subfamily: Hypeninae
- Genus: Niaccabana; Strand, 1920
- Species: N. siculipalpis

Binomial name
- Niaccabana siculipalpis Strand, 1920

Genus of moths

Niaccabana is a monotypic moth genus of the family Erebidae. Its only species, Niaccabana siculipalpis, is found in Taiwan. Both the genus and the species were first described by Strand in 1920.
