= Neoptodes =

Scientific classification
- Domain: Eukaryota
- Kingdom: Animalia
- Phylum: Arthropoda
- Class: Insecta
- Order: Lepidoptera
- Superfamily: Noctuoidea
- Family: Erebidae
- Subfamily: Calpinae
- Genus: Neoptodes; Schaus, 1914
- Species: N. caicus

Binomial name
- Neoptodes caicus Schaus, 1914

Genus of moths

Neoptodes is a monotypic moth genus of the family Erebidae. Its only species, Neoptodes caicus, is found in French Guiana. Both the genus and the species were first described by William Schaus in 1914.
