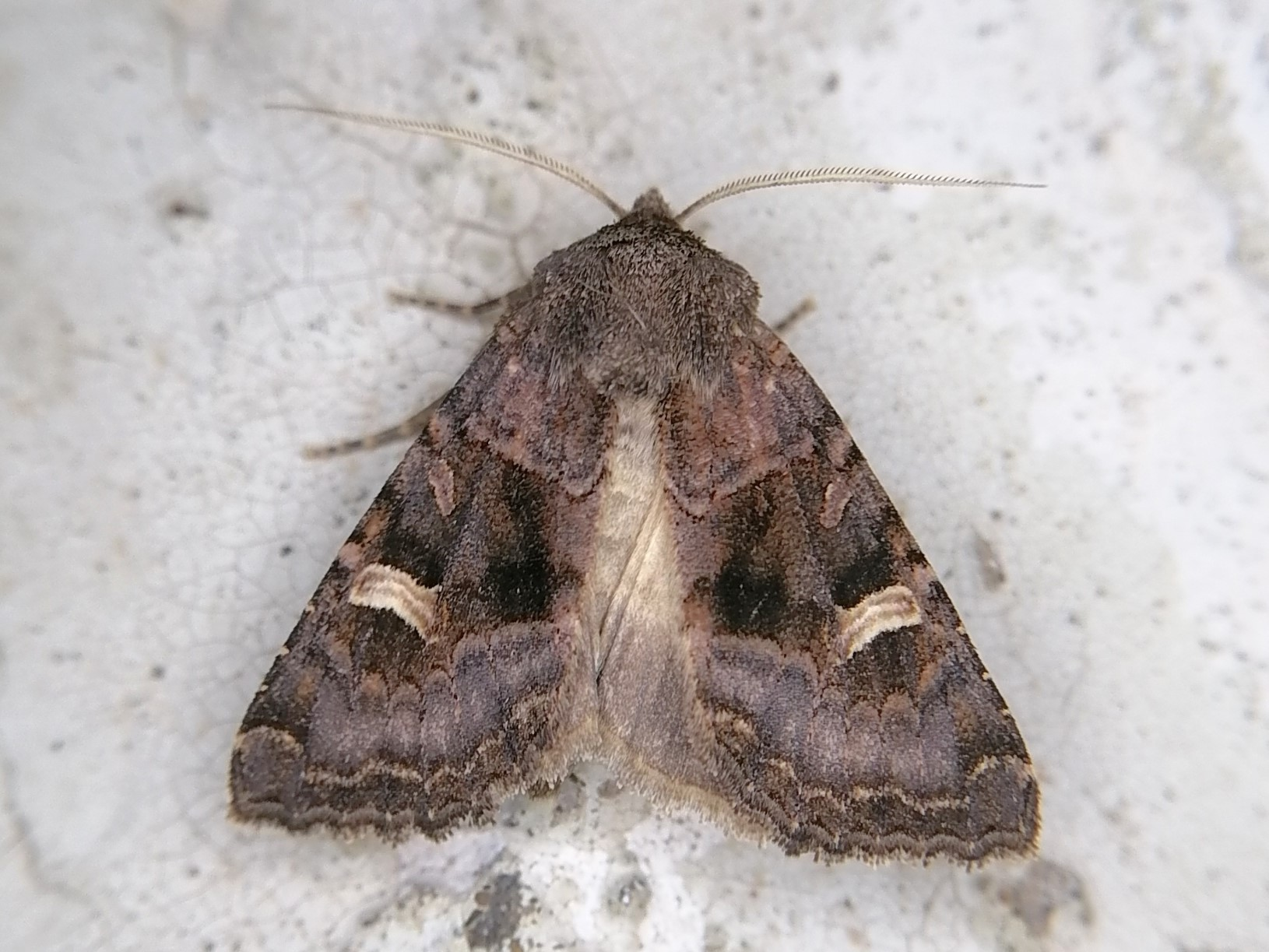

Scientific classification
- Kingdom: Animalia
- Phylum: Arthropoda
- Class: Insecta
- Order: Lepidoptera
- Superfamily: Noctuoidea
- Family: Noctuidae
- Genus: Nyssocnemis; Lederer, 1857
- Species: N. eversmanni

Binomial name
- Nyssocnemis eversmanni (Lederer, 1853)

= Nyssocnemis =

Genus of moths

Nyssocnemis is a genus of moths in the family Noctuidae. It is monotypic, being represented by the single species Nyssocnemis eversmanni.
