= Neotarache =

Scientific classification
- Domain: Eukaryota
- Kingdom: Animalia
- Phylum: Arthropoda
- Class: Insecta
- Order: Lepidoptera
- Superfamily: Noctuoidea
- Family: Noctuidae
- Subfamily: Condicinae
- Genus: Neotarache; Barnes & Benjamin, 1922
- Species: N. deserticola

Binomial name
- Neotarache deserticola Barnes & Benjamin, 1922

Genus of moths

Neotarache is a monotypic moth genus of the family Noctuidae. Its only species, Neotarache deserticola, is found in the US state of Nevada. Both the genus and species were first described by William Barnes and Foster Hendrickson Benjamin in 1922.
