= Neocerynea =

Scientific classification
- Kingdom: Animalia
- Phylum: Arthropoda
- Class: Insecta
- Order: Lepidoptera
- Superfamily: Noctuoidea
- Family: Noctuidae
- Subfamily: Acontiinae
- Genus: Neocerynea; Hampson, 1918
- Species: N. sabulosa

Binomial name
- Neocerynea sabulosa (Schaus, 1901)

Synonyms
- Capnodes sabulosa Schaus, 1901

Genus of moths

Neocerynea is a monotypic moth genus of the family Noctuidae erected by George Hampson in 1918. Its only species, Neocerynea sabulosa, was first described by Schaus in 1901. It is found in Mexico.
