= Neoborolia =

Scientific classification
- Kingdom: Animalia
- Phylum: Arthropoda
- Class: Insecta
- Order: Lepidoptera
- Superfamily: Noctuoidea
- Family: Noctuidae
- Genus: Neoborolia

Genus of moths

Neoborolia is a genus of moths of the family Noctuidae. They were discovered by Japanese entomologist Shōnen Matsumura in 1926. The genus was definied to include the species Neoborolia nohirae.
