= Naboa =

Scientific classification
- Domain: Eukaryota
- Kingdom: Animalia
- Phylum: Arthropoda
- Class: Insecta
- Order: Lepidoptera
- Superfamily: Noctuoidea
- Family: Erebidae
- Subfamily: Hypeninae
- Genus: Naboa; Nye, 1975

Genus of moths

Naboa is a genus of moths of the family Erebidae. The genus was described by Nye in 1975.

== Species ==
- Naboa cataleuca (Herrich-Schäffer, [1858]) - Amazon River
- Naboa semialba (Walker, 1862) - Brazil
