= Nyctennomos =

Scientific classification
- Kingdom: Animalia
- Phylum: Arthropoda
- Class: Insecta
- Order: Lepidoptera
- Superfamily: Noctuoidea
- Family: Erebidae
- Subfamily: Calpinae
- Genus: Nyctennomos; Hampson, 1926

Type species
- Nyctennomos peratosema Hampson, 1926

Genus of moths

Nyctennomos is a genus of moths of the family Erebidae. The genus was erected by George Hampson in 1926. All species of this genus are known from Madagascar.

Species in this genus are:

- Nyctennomos ambitsha Viette, 1976
- Nyctennomos catalai (Viette, 1954)
- Nyctennomos decaryi (Viette, 1954)
- Nyctennomos descarpentriesi (Viette, 1954)
- Nyctennomos peratosema Hampson, 1926
- Nyctennomos subpurpurascens (Viette, 1954)
- Nyctennomos ungulata Berio, 1956
