= Neeugoa =

Scientific classification
- Domain: Eukaryota
- Kingdom: Animalia
- Phylum: Arthropoda
- Class: Insecta
- Order: Lepidoptera
- Superfamily: Noctuoidea
- Family: Erebidae
- Subfamily: Calpinae
- Genus: Neeugoa; Wileman & South, 1916
- Species: N. kanshireiensis

Binomial name
- Neeugoa kanshireiensis Wileman & South, 1916

Genus of moths

Neeugoa is a monotypic moth genus of the family Erebidae. Its only species, Neeugoa kanshireiensis, is found in Taiwan. Both the genus and species were first described by Wileman and South in 1916.
