= Neostrotia =

Scientific classification
- Missing taxonomy template (fix): Neostrotia

Genus of moths

Neostrotia is a genus of moths of the family Noctuidae.
