= Nyctipolia =

Scientific classification
- Domain: Eukaryota
- Kingdom: Animalia
- Phylum: Arthropoda
- Class: Insecta
- Order: Lepidoptera
- Superfamily: Noctuoidea
- Family: Erebidae
- Subfamily: Herminiinae
- Genus: Nyctipolia; Schaus, 1916
- Species: N. incondita

Binomial name
- Nyctipolia incondita Schaus, 1916

Genus of moths

Nyctipolia is a monotypic moth genus of the family Erebidae. Its only species, Nyctipolia incondita, is found in French Guiana. Both the genus and species were first described by William Schaus in 1916.
