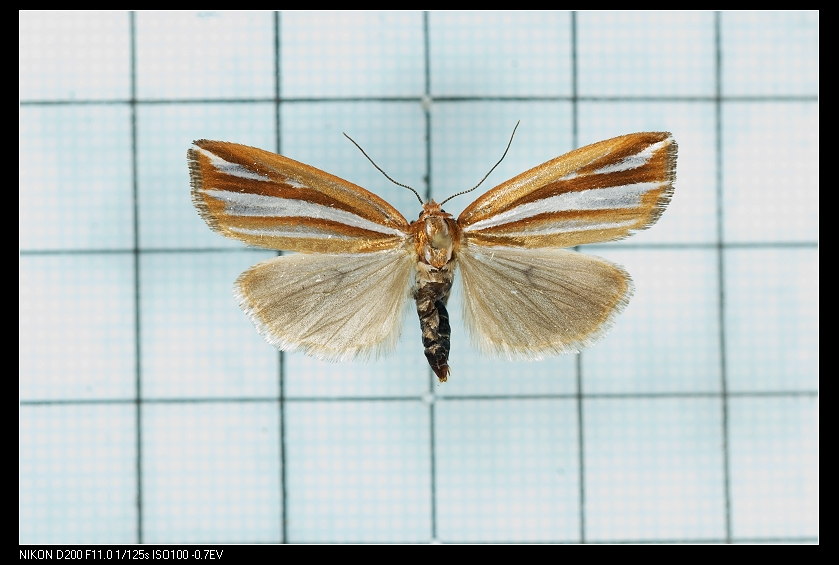
- Narangodes argyrostrigatus

Scientific classification
- Kingdom: Animalia
- Phylum: Arthropoda
- Class: Insecta
- Order: Lepidoptera
- Superfamily: Noctuoidea
- Family: Noctuidae
- Subfamily: Acontiinae
- Genus: Narangodes; Hampson, 1910

= Narangodes =

Genus of moths

Narangodes is a genus of moths of the family Noctuidae. The genus was erected by George Hampson in 1910.

== Species ==
- Narangodes argyrostrigatus Sugi, 1990
- Narangodes confluens Sugi, 1990
- Narangodes flavibasis Sugi, 1990
- Narangodes haemorranta Hampson, 1910
- Narangodes nigridiscata Swinhoe, 1901
- Narangodes nudariodes Hampson, 1918
