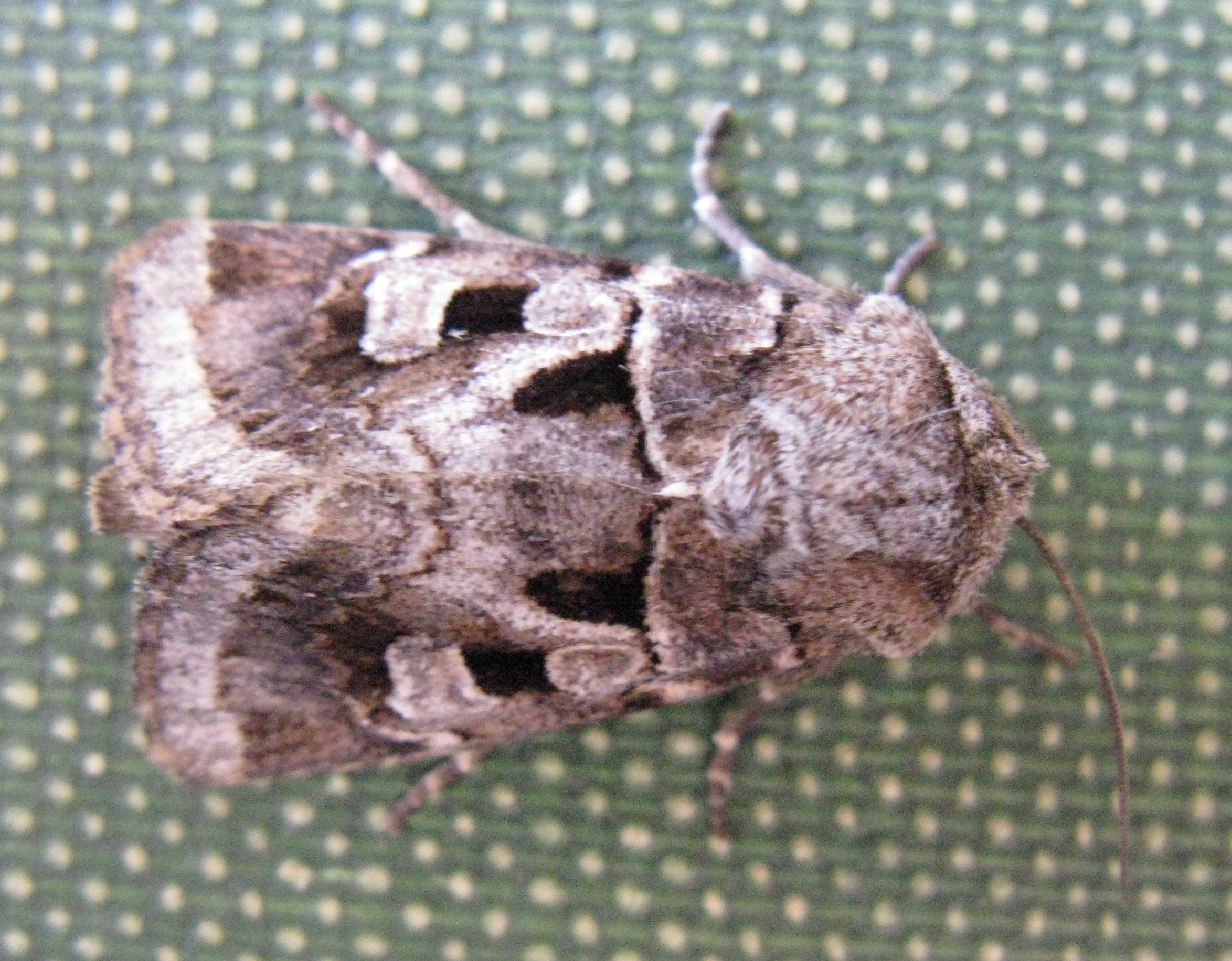
- Neuranethes spodopterodes

Scientific classification
- Domain: Eukaryota
- Kingdom: Animalia
- Phylum: Arthropoda
- Class: Insecta
- Order: Lepidoptera
- Superfamily: Noctuoidea
- Family: Noctuidae
- Genus: Neuranethes

= Neuranethes =

Genus of moths

Neuranethes is a small genus of herbivorous African moths in the family Noctuidae. Species include:

- Neuranethes angola Bethune-Baker 1911
- Neuranethes avitta Fawcett 1917
- Neuranethes spodopterodes Hampson 1908
