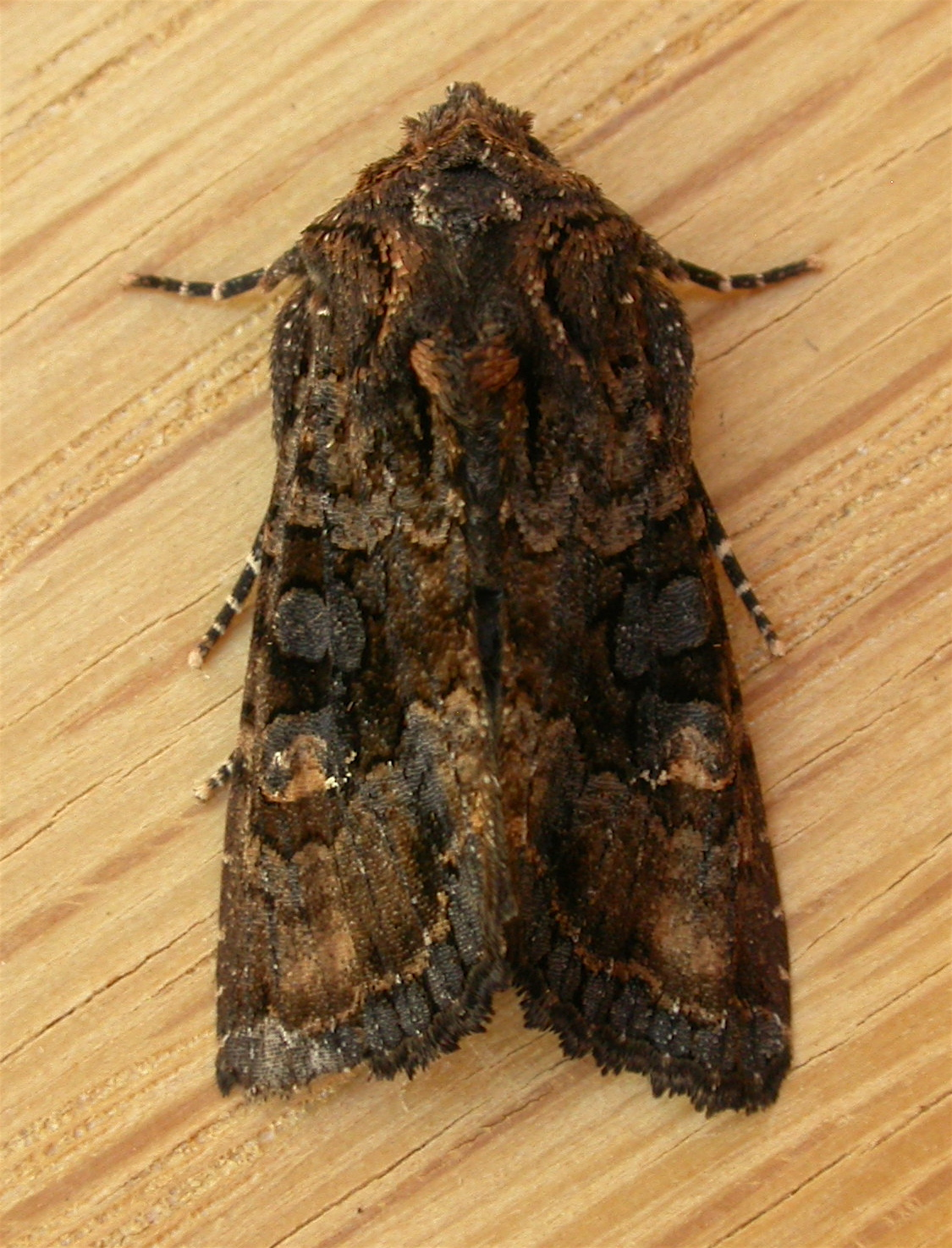
- Neumichtis archephanes Turner, 1920, to MV light, Aranda, ACT, 3/4 November 2008

Scientific classification
- Kingdom: Animalia
- Phylum: Arthropoda
- Class: Insecta
- Order: Lepidoptera
- Superfamily: Noctuoidea
- Family: Noctuidae
- Subfamily: Noctuinae
- Genus: Neumichtis; Hampson, 1906

= Neumichtis =

Genus of moths

Neumichtis is a genus of moths of the family Noctuidae.

== Species ==
- Neumichtis adamantina (Turner, 1906)
- Neumichtis archephanes Turner, 1920
- Neumichtis callisina (Turner, 1902)
- Neumichtis expulsa (Guenée, 1852)
- Neumichtis iorrhoa (Meyrick, 1902)
- Neumichtis mesophaea (Hampson, 1906)
- Neumichtis nigerrima (Guenée, 1852)
- Neumichtis prolifera (Walker, 1856)
- Neumichtis saliaris (Guenée, 1852)
- Neumichtis sepultrix (Guenée, 1852)
- Neumichtis signata (Lower, 1905)
- Neumichtis spumigera (Guenée, 1852)
