= Neocodia =

Scientific classification
- Domain: Eukaryota
- Kingdom: Animalia
- Phylum: Arthropoda
- Class: Insecta
- Order: Lepidoptera
- Superfamily: Noctuoidea
- Family: Noctuidae
- Subfamily: Acontiinae
- Genus: Neocodia; Schaus, 1911

Genus of moths

Neocodia is a genus of moths of the family Noctuidae. The genus was described by William Schaus in 1911.

== Species ==
- Neocodia albidivisa Dognin, 1914 Ecuador
- Neocodia asna Schaus, 1911 Costa Rica
