= Nolaphana =

Scientific classification
- Kingdom: Animalia
- Phylum: Arthropoda
- Class: Insecta
- Order: Lepidoptera
- Superfamily: Noctuoidea
- Family: Noctuidae
- Genus: Nolaphana

Genus of moths

Nolaphana is a genus of moths of the family Noctuidae. Features of the genus are rounded wings.

== General References ==
- Natural History Museum Lepidoptera genus database
