= Neathyrma =

Scientific classification
- Kingdom: Animalia
- Phylum: Arthropoda
- Class: Insecta
- Order: Lepidoptera
- Superfamily: Noctuoidea
- Family: Erebidae
- Subfamily: Calpinae
- Genus: Neathyrma; Hampson, 1926
- Species: N. iridescens

Binomial name
- Neathyrma iridescens (Dognin, 1914)

Synonyms
- Baniana iridescens Dognin, 1914

Genus of moths

Neathyrma is a monotypic moth genus of the family Erebidae erected by George Hampson in 1926. Its only species, Neathyrma iridescens, was first described by Paul Dognin in 1914. It is found in Colombia.
