= Neophaenis =

Scientific classification
- Kingdom: Animalia
- Phylum: Arthropoda
- Class: Insecta
- Order: Lepidoptera
- Superfamily: Noctuoidea
- Family: Noctuidae
- Tribe: Dypterygiini
- Genus: Neophaenis; Hampson, 1908

Genus of moths

Neophaenis is a genus of moths of the family Noctuidae.

== Species ==
- Neophaenis aedemon Dyar, 1909
- Neophaenis boucheri Barbut & Lalanne-Cassou, 2004
- Neophaenis catocala Hampson, 1911
- Neophaenis frauenfeldi (Felder & Rogenhofer, 1874)
- Neophaenis lichenea Hampson, 1918
- Neophaenis meterythra Hampson, 1908
- Neophaenis psittacea (Schaus, 1898)
- Neophaenis respondens (Walker, 1858)
