= Naganoella =

Scientific classification
- Kingdom: Animalia
- Phylum: Arthropoda
- Clade: Pancrustacea
- Class: Insecta
- Order: Lepidoptera
- Superfamily: Noctuoidea
- Family: Erebidae
- Subfamily: Boletobiinae
- Genus: Naganoella; Sugi in Inoue, Sugi, Kuroko, Moriuti & Kawabe, 1982
- Species: N. timandra

Binomial name
- Naganoella timandra (Alphéraky, 1897)

Synonyms
- Dierna timandra Alphéraky, 1897; Perynea pvilcherina Nagano, 1918

Genus of moths

Naganoella is a monotypic moth genus of the family Erebidae erected by Shigero Sugi in 1982. Its only species, Naganoella timandra, was first described by Sergei Alphéraky in 1897. It is found in Korea and Japan.
