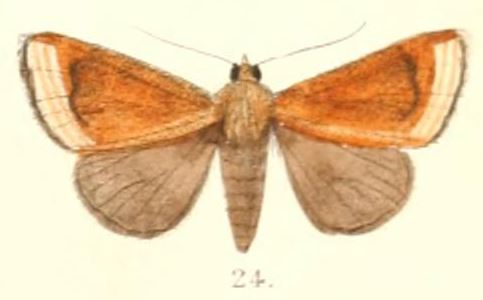
- Nikara castanea

Scientific classification
- Domain: Eukaryota
- Kingdom: Animalia
- Phylum: Arthropoda
- Class: Insecta
- Order: Lepidoptera
- Superfamily: Noctuoidea
- Family: Noctuidae
- Genus: Nikara; Moore, 1882

Type species
- *Nikara castanea

Synonyms
- Nicara Hampson, 1908 & 1910

= Nikara =

Genus of moths

Nikara is a genus of moths of the family Noctuidae described by Frederic Moore in 1882.

== Species ==
- Nikara castanea Moore, 1882 (from India)
- Nikara plusiodes de Joannis, 1914 (Yunnan, China)
