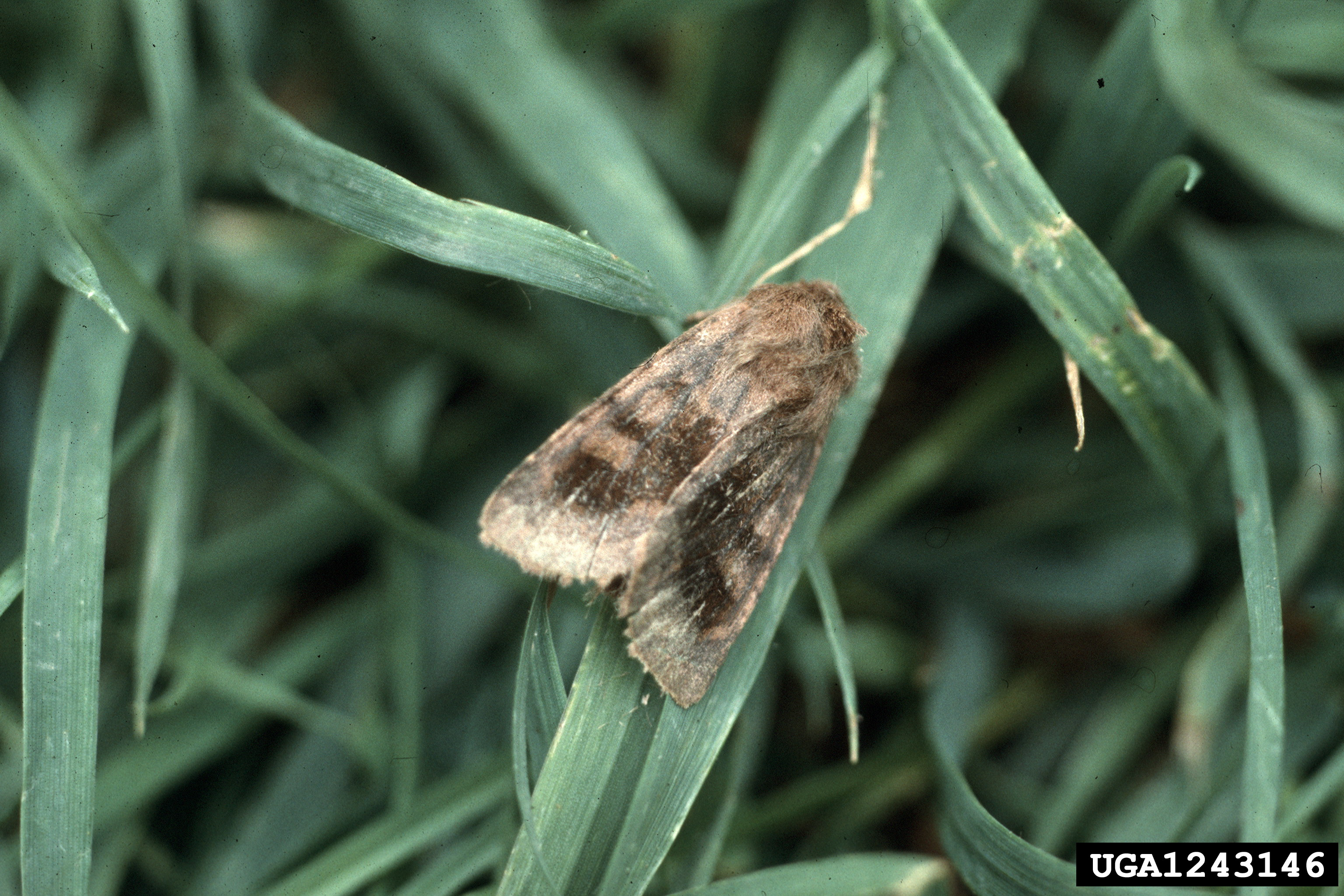
- Nephelodes minians

Scientific classification
- Kingdom: Animalia
- Phylum: Arthropoda
- Class: Insecta
- Order: Lepidoptera
- Superfamily: Noctuoidea
- Family: Noctuidae
- Tribe: Tholerini
- Genus: Nephelodes; Guenée, 1852

= Nephelodes =

Genus of moths

Nephelodes is a genus of moths of the family Noctuidae.

== Selected species ==
- Nephelodes adusta Buckett, 1972, [1973]
- Nephelodes carminata (Smith, 1890)
- Nephelodes carminea Dognin, 1912
- Nephelodes demaculata Barnes & McDunnough, 1918
- Nephelodes mendica Barnes & Lindsey, 1921
- Nephelodes minians - Bronzed Cutworm or Shaded Umber Moth Guenée, 1852
