= Nephelistis =

Scientific classification
- Kingdom: Animalia
- Phylum: Arthropoda
- Class: Insecta
- Order: Lepidoptera
- Superfamily: Noctuoidea
- Family: Noctuidae
- Genus: Nephelistis; Hampson, 1905

Genus of moths

Nephelistis is a genus of moths of the family Noctuidae.

== Species ==
- Nephelistis congenitalis Hampson, 1905
- Nephelistis differens (Druce, 1889)
