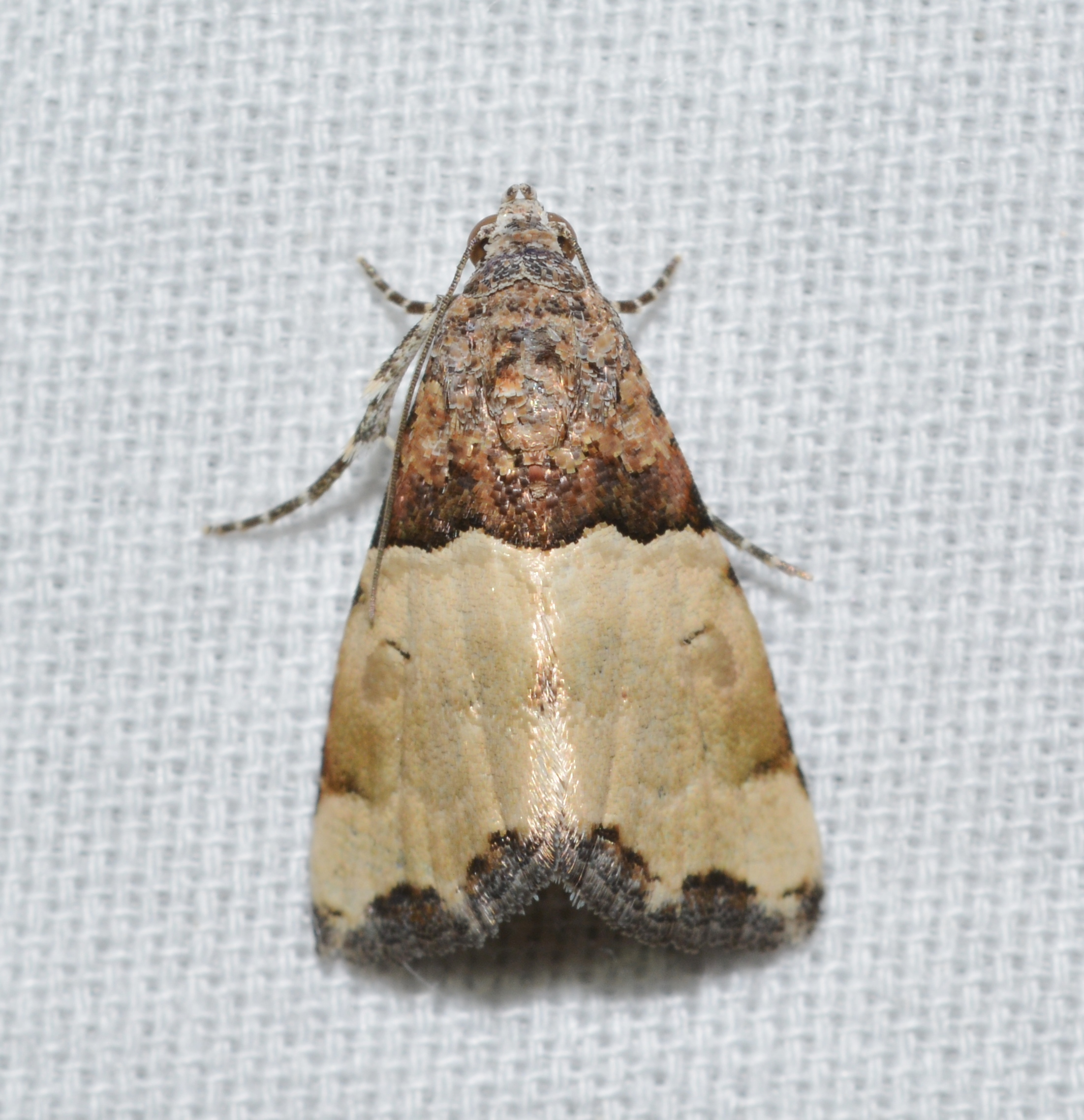
- Cobubatha dividua

Scientific classification
- Kingdom: Animalia
- Phylum: Arthropoda
- Class: Insecta
- Order: Lepidoptera
- Superfamily: Noctuoidea
- Family: Noctuidae
- Subfamily: Cobubathinae
- Genus: Cobubatha; Walker, 1863

Type species
- Cobubatha metaspilaris Walker, 1863

Synonyms
- Nerastria McDunnough, 1937

= Cobubatha =

Genus of moths

Cobubatha is a genus of moths of the family Noctuidae. It was erected by Francis Walker in 1863.

== Species ==
- Cobubatha albiciliatus Smith, 1903
- Cobubatha dissociata Dyar, 1912
- Cobubatha dividua Grote, 1879
- Cobubatha hippotes Druce, 1889
- Cobubatha inveterata Dyar, 1914
- Cobubatha ipilla Dyar, 1916 (syn: Cobubatha rustica Dyar, 1918)
- Cobubatha lixiva Grote, 1882 (syn: Cobubatha basicinerea Grote, 1882, Cobubatha lixinites Dyar, 1912)
- Cobubatha megaplaga Dyar, 1912
- Cobubatha melor Dyar, 1912
- Cobubatha melorista Dyar, 1912
- Cobubatha metaspilaris Walker, 1863 (syn: Cobubatha punctifinis Hampson, 1910)
- Cobubatha numa Druce, 1889
- Cobubatha ochrocraspis Hampson, 1910
- Cobubatha orthozona Hampson, 1910 (syn: Cobubatha antonita Dyar, 1911, Cobubatha victrix Dyar, 1912)
- Cobubatha plumbifusa Dyar, 1912
