= Nanamonodes =

Scientific classification
- Kingdom: Animalia
- Phylum: Arthropoda
- Class: Insecta
- Order: Lepidoptera
- Superfamily: Noctuoidea
- Family: Noctuidae
- Subfamily: Acontiinae
- Genus: Nanamonodes; Hampson, 1914

Genus of moths

Nanamonodes is a genus of moths of the family Noctuidae. The genus was erected by George Hampson in 1914.

== Species ==
- Nanamonodes albilinea Hampson, 1914 Venezuela
- Nanamonodes trilineata Schaus, 1914 French Guiana
