= Nicevillea =

Scientific classification
- Kingdom: Animalia
- Phylum: Arthropoda
- Class: Insecta
- Order: Lepidoptera
- Superfamily: Noctuoidea
- Family: Erebidae
- Subfamily: Calpinae
- Genus: Nicevillea; Hampson, 1895
- Species: N. epiplemoides

Binomial name
- Nicevillea epiplemoides Hampson, 1895

Genus of moths

Nicevillea is a monotypic moth genus of the family Erebidae. Its only species, Nicevillea epiplemoides, is found in Myanmar, Thailand, Peninsular Malaysia, Sumatra and Borneo. Both the genus and the species were first described by George Hampson in 1895.
