= Niaccaba =

Scientific classification
- Kingdom: Animalia
- Phylum: Arthropoda
- Class: Insecta
- Order: Lepidoptera
- Superfamily: Noctuoidea
- Family: Noctuidae
- Subfamily: Acontiinae
- Genus: Niaccaba; Walker, 1866
- Species: N. sumptualis

Binomial name
- Niaccaba sumptualis Walker, 1865

Genus of moths

Niaccaba is a monotypic moth genus of the family Noctuidae first described by Francis Walker in 1866. Its single species, Niaccaba sumptualis, described by the same author one year earlier, is found in Sri Lanka, the Ryukyu Islands and Borneo.

== Description ==
Palpi sickle shaped and reaching above vertex of head, with minute third joint. Antennae of male ciliated. Forewings with acute apex. The outer margin excurved at vein 4, then very oblique to outer angle. Veins 3 and 4 stalked and vein 6 from below angle of cell. Vein 7 arises from angle and veins 8 and 9 stalked from before angle. Vein 10 absent. Hindwings with excised outer margin between veins 6 and 4. Veins 3 and 4 stalked and vein 5 arises from near middle of discocellulars. Veins 6 and 7 from upper angle of cell.
