= Nolasena =

Scientific classification
- Kingdom: Animalia
- Phylum: Arthropoda
- Class: Insecta
- Order: Lepidoptera
- Superfamily: Noctuoidea
- Family: Erebidae
- Subfamily: Calpinae
- Genus: Nolasena; Walker, [1858]
- Species: N. ferrifervens

Binomial name
- Nolasena ferrifervens Walker, [1858]

Synonyms
- Generic: Banassa Walker, 1863; Specific: Nolasena ferrifervens Walker, [1858] 1857; Banassa rutilans Walker, 1863

Genus of moths

Nolasena is a monotypic moth genus of the family Erebidae. Its only species, Nolasena ferrifervens, is found in India, Sri Lanka, Borneo and the Philippines. Both the genus and species were first described by Francis Walker in 1858.

== Description ==
Palpi porrect (extending forward), where the second joint fringed with hair above, and third acute at apex. Antennae minutely ciliated. Forewings with slightly acute apex. Veins 8 and 9 anastomosing (fusing) to form an areole.

The species' wingspan is 18–21 mm.
