= Nechesia =

Scientific classification
- Kingdom: Animalia
- Phylum: Arthropoda
- Class: Insecta
- Order: Lepidoptera
- Superfamily: Noctuoidea
- Family: Erebidae
- Subfamily: Hypeninae
- Genus: Nechesia; Walker, 1862
- Species: N. albotentata

Binomial name
- Nechesia albotentata Walker, 1862

Genus of moths

Nechesia is a monotypic moth genus of the family Erebidae. Its only species, Nechesia albotentata, is found in Borneo. Both the genus and the species were first described by Francis Walker in 1862.
