= List of noctuid genera: R =

The huge moth family Noctuidae contains the following genera:

A B C D E F G H I J K L M N O P Q R S T U V W X Y Z

- Rabila
- Rachiplusia
- Raclia
- Radara
- Raddea
- Radinacra
- Radinocera
- Radinogoes
- Radinotia
- Radosa
- Ragana
- Raghuva
- Ramadasa
- Ramesodes
- Ramopia
- Ramphia
- Rancora
- Raparna
- Raphia
- Raphiscopa
- Rasihia
- Reabotis
- Recoropha
- Rectangulipalpus
- Rectipalpula
- Redectis
- Redingtonia
- Rejectaria
- Rema
- Remigia
- Remigiodes
- Renia
- Renisania
- Renodes
- Renyigoga
- Resapamea
- Resperdrina
- Rethma
- Reticcala
- Reticulana
- Retusia
- Rhabdophera
- Rhabdotina
- Rhabinogana
- Rhabinopteryx
- Rhaesena
- Rhamnocampa
- Rhangena
- Rhanidophora
- Rhapsa
- Rhatta
- Rhazunda
- Rhesala
- Rhesalides
- Rhesalistis
- Rhescipha
- Rhiscipha
- Rhiza
- Rhizagrotis
- Rhizedra
- Rhizolitha
- Rhizotype
- Rhodina
- Rhodochlaena
- Rhododactyla
- Rhododipsa
- Rhodoecia
- Rhodophora
- Rhodosea
- Rhodotarache
- Rhopalognatha
- Rhoptrotrichia
- Rhosologia
- Rhosus
- Rhubuna
- Rhyacia
- Rhynchaglaea
- Rhynchagrotis
- Rhynchina
- Rhynchodia
- Rhynchodina
- Rhynchodontodes
- Rhyncholita
- Rhynchoplexia
- Rhypagla
- Rhytia
- Riadhia
- Riaga
- Riagria
- Richia
- Ricla
- Rictonis
- Rileyiana
- Rimulia
- Ripagrotis
- Ripogenus
- Ripolia
- Ristra
- Rivula
- Rivulana
- Roborbotodes
- Rodriguesia
- Rolua
- Ronania
- Roperua
- Rororthosia
- Roseoblemma
- Rostrypena
- Rothia
- Rotoa
- Rougeotia
- Rougeotiana
- Rowdenia
- Ruacodes
- Rubarsia
- Rufachola
- Rugofrontia
- Rungsianea
- Rusicada
- Rusidrina
- Rusina
