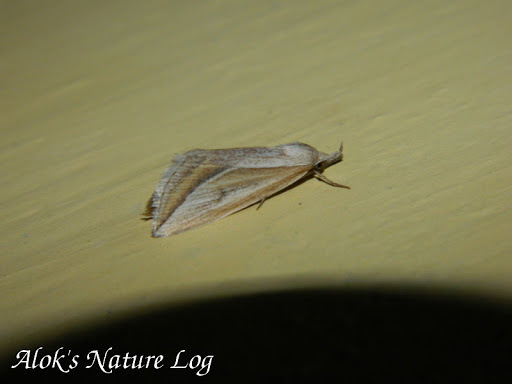

Scientific classification
- Kingdom: Animalia
- Phylum: Arthropoda
- Class: Insecta
- Order: Lepidoptera
- Superfamily: Noctuoidea
- Family: Erebidae
- Genus: Rhynchina
- Species: R. obliqualis

Binomial name
- Rhynchina obliqualis (Kollar, 1844)

Synonyms
- Hypena obliqualis Kollar, 1844; Hypena masurialis Guenée, 1854; Rhynchina cramboides Butler, 1879

= Rhynchina obliqualis =

Species of moth

Rhynchina obliqualis is a moth of the family Erebidae first described by Vincenz Kollar in 1844. The type locality is Mussoorie, in the Indian Himalayas.

R. obliqualis had been widely confused with Hypena obacerralis in the past. Hypena masurialis was an unnecessary replacement name for R. obliqualis but most observations under this species name are probably Hypena obacerralis.

== Distribution and habitat ==
The moth is found across Africa and in parts of the Middle East.
