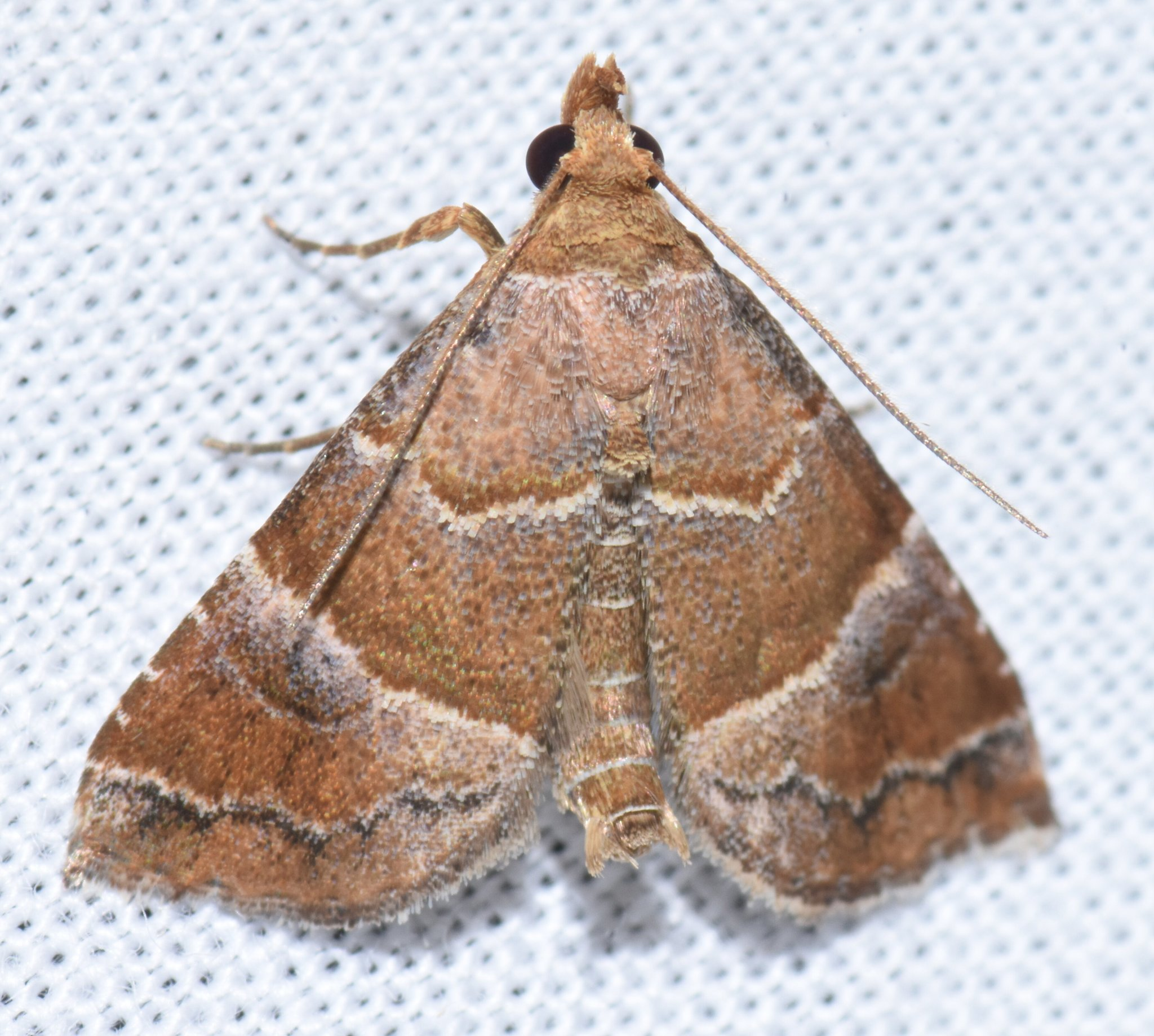

Scientific classification
- Domain: Eukaryota
- Kingdom: Animalia
- Phylum: Arthropoda
- Class: Insecta
- Order: Lepidoptera
- Superfamily: Noctuoidea
- Family: Erebidae
- Genus: Cecharismena
- Species: C. cara

Binomial name
- Cecharismena cara Moschler, 1890

= Cecharismena cara =

Species of moth

Cecharismena cara is a species of moth in the family Erebidae. It is found in North America.
