= Metria bilineata =

Scientific classification
- Domain: Eukaryota
- Kingdom: Animalia
- Phylum: Arthropoda
- Class: Insecta
- Order: Lepidoptera
- Superfamily: Noctuoidea
- Family: Erebidae
- Tribe: Omopterini
- Genus: Metria
- Species: M. bilineata

Binomial name
- Metria bilineata (Smith, 1899)

Species of moth

Metria bilineata is a species of moth in the family Erebidae.

The MONA or Hodges number for Metria bilineata is 8667.
