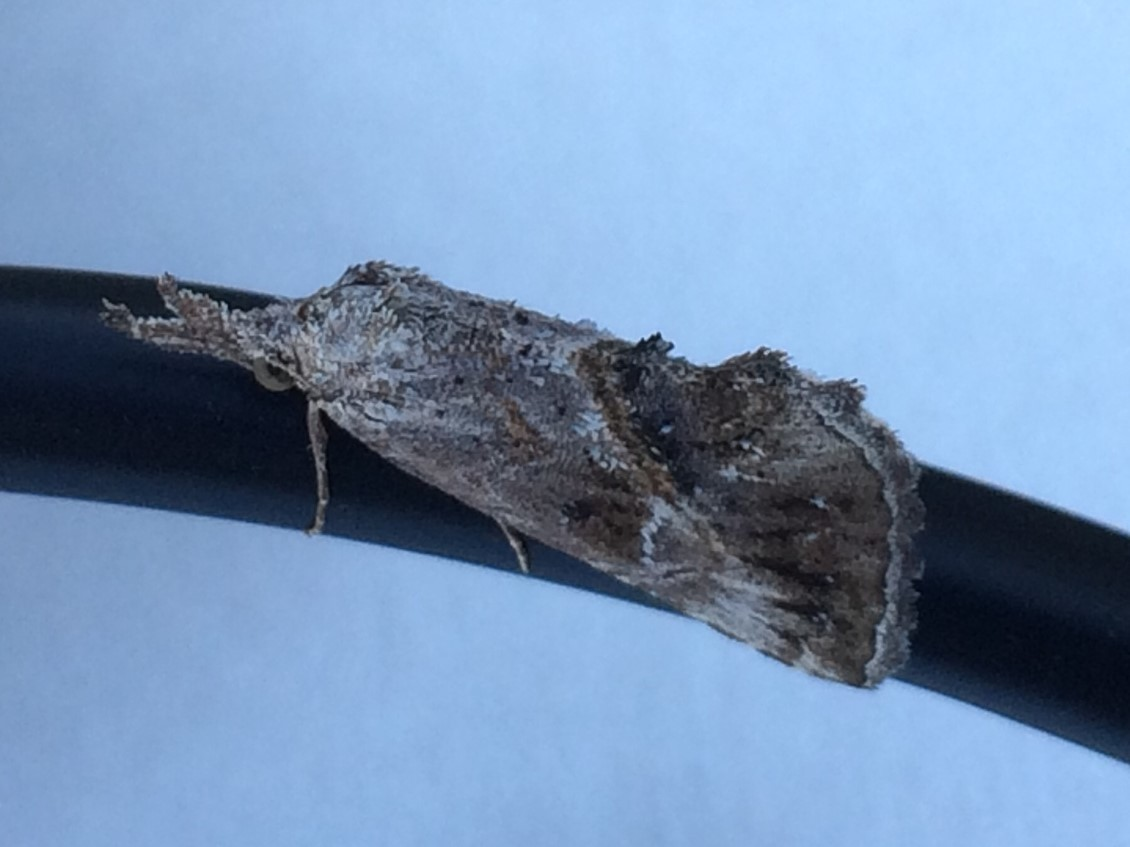

Scientific classification
- Kingdom: Animalia
- Phylum: Arthropoda
- Clade: Pancrustacea
- Class: Insecta
- Order: Lepidoptera
- Superfamily: Noctuoidea
- Family: Erebidae
- Genus: Zekelita
- Species: Z. antiqualis

Binomial name
- Zekelita antiqualis (Hübner, [1809])

Synonyms
- Ravalita antiqualis

= Zekelita antiqualis =

Species of moth

Zekelita antiqualis is a moth of the family Erebidae first described by Jacob Hübner in 1809. It is found in the Balkans, the Near East, the Caucasian region and in the Levant in Lebanon, Israel and Jordan.

Adults are on wing from March to April and in October. There are probably multiple generations per year.

The larvae feed on Salvia officinalis and other Labiatae species.
