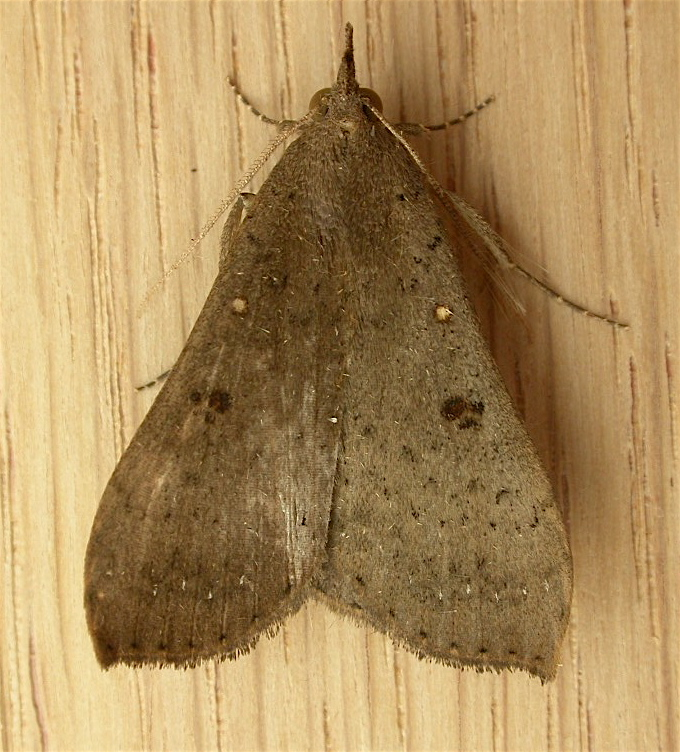

Scientific classification
- Kingdom: Animalia
- Phylum: Arthropoda
- Class: Insecta
- Order: Lepidoptera
- Superfamily: Noctuoidea
- Family: Erebidae
- Genus: Rhapsa
- Species: R. suscitatalis

Binomial name
- Rhapsa suscitatalis Walker, 1859

= Rhapsa suscitatalis =

Species of moth

Rhapsa suscitatalis, the wedged rhapsa, is a moth of the family Noctuidae first described by Francis Walker in 1859. It is found in Australia in New South Wales, the Australian Capital Territory, Victoria, Tasmania and South Australia.
