= Radara subcupralis =

Scientific classification
- Kingdom: Animalia
- Phylum: Arthropoda
- Clade: Pancrustacea
- Class: Insecta
- Order: Lepidoptera
- Superfamily: Noctuoidea
- Family: Erebidae
- Genus: Radara
- Species: R. subcupralis

Binomial name
- Radara subcupralis (Walker, 1866)

Synonyms
- Bertula ? subcupralis Walker, [1866]; Rhaesena transcissa Walker, [1866]; Rhaesena oblquifasciata Moore, 1882; Symplusia frequens Holland, 1894

Species of moth

Radara subcupralis is a moth of the family Noctuidae first described by Francis Walker in 1866.

== Distribution ==
It is found in African countries such as Botswana, Cameroon, the Comoros, the Democratic Republic of the Congo, Eritrea, Eswatini, the Gambia, Ghana, Kenya, Madagascar, Malawi, Mozambique, Namibia, Réunion, Somalia, South Africa, Tanzania, Zambia and Zimbabwe. In Asian regions, it is found in India and Sri Lanka.

== Description ==
Male antennae fasciculate serrate. Adults with characteristic reddish-brown forewings. Fasciae are well separated at the costa. Hindwings are medium brown. Caterpillars are known to feed on Tragia brevipes, Asystasia and Tragia durbanensis species.
