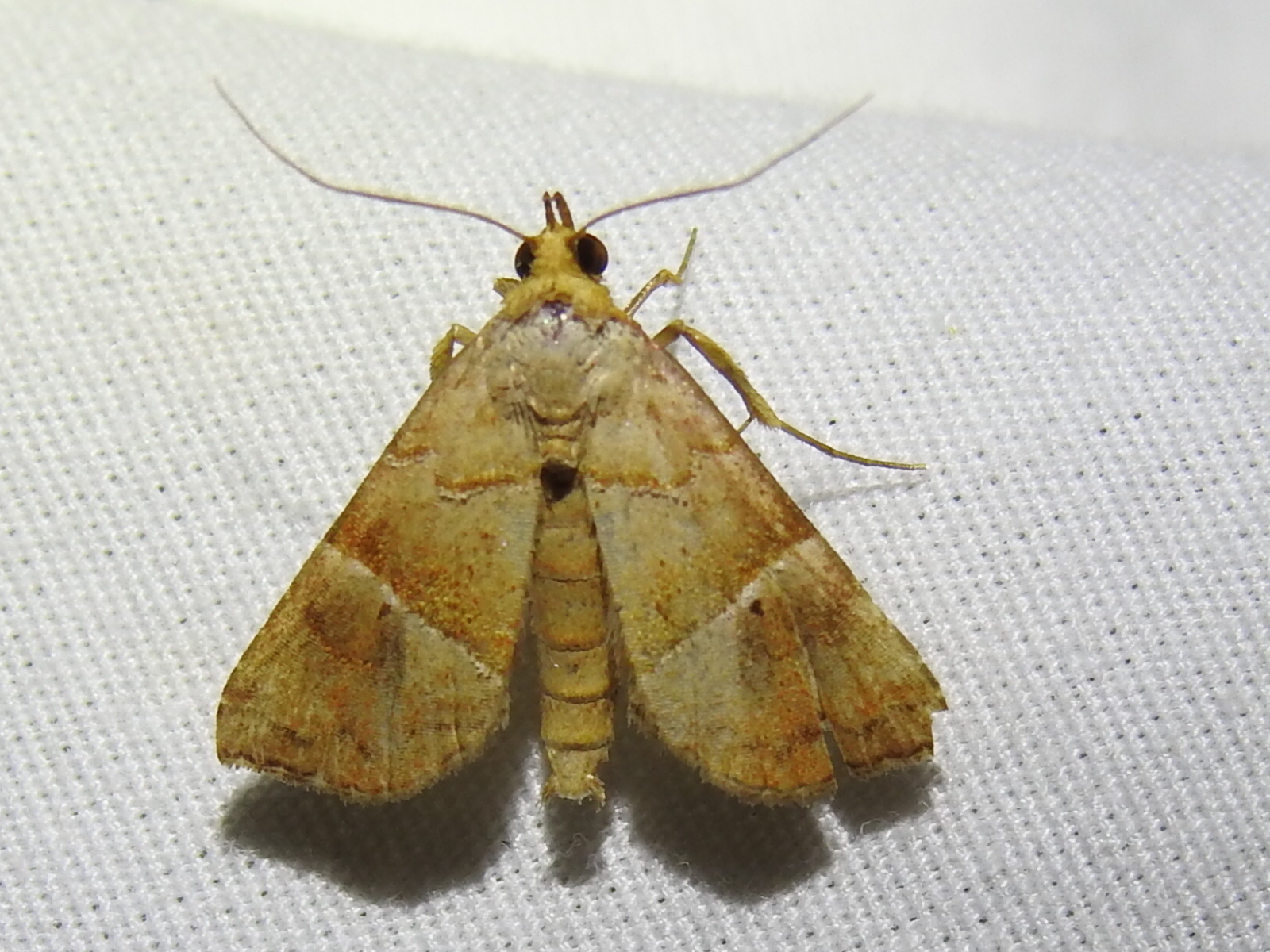

Scientific classification
- Domain: Eukaryota
- Kingdom: Animalia
- Phylum: Arthropoda
- Class: Insecta
- Order: Lepidoptera
- Superfamily: Noctuoidea
- Family: Erebidae
- Genus: Cecharismena
- Species: C. jalapena

Binomial name
- Cecharismena jalapena (Schaus, 1906)

= Cecharismena jalapena =

Species of moth

Cecharismena jalapena is a species of moth in the family Erebidae.
