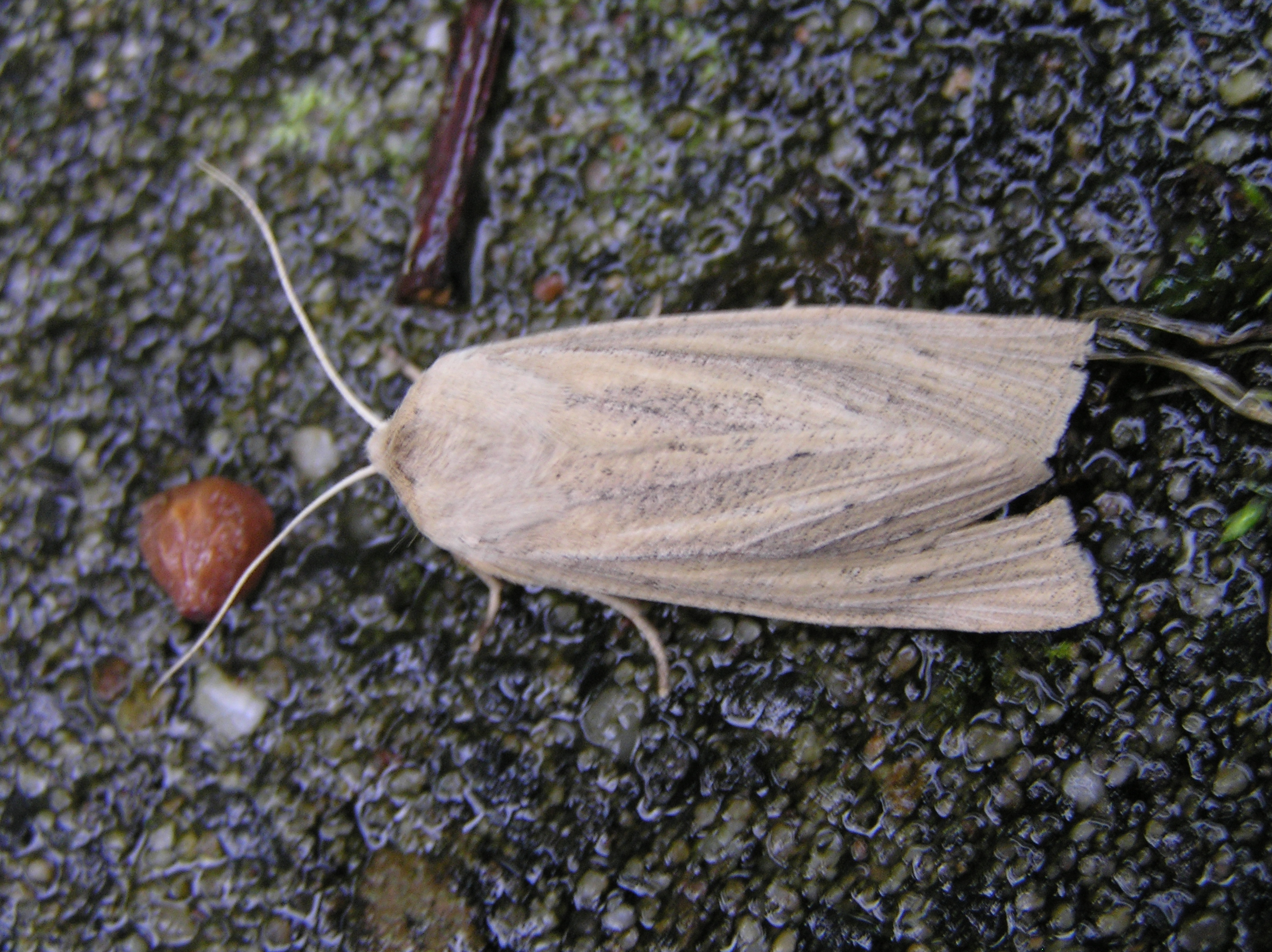

Scientific classification
- Domain: Eukaryota
- Kingdom: Animalia
- Phylum: Arthropoda
- Class: Insecta
- Order: Lepidoptera
- Superfamily: Noctuoidea
- Family: Noctuidae
- Genus: Rhizedra
- Species: R. lutosa

Binomial name
- Rhizedra lutosa (Hübner, 1803)

= Rhizedra lutosa =

Species of moth

Rhizedra lutosa, the large wainscot or Isle of Wight wainscot, is a species of moth of the family Noctuidae. It is native to the Palearctic realm (Ireland to Japan including the Russian Far East and Siberia). It has been introduced into eastern North America and is spreading.

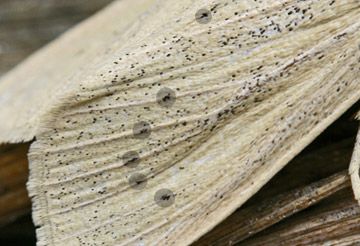
Detail of the wing, showing spots

== Technical description and variation ==
The wingspan is 42–50 mm. The length of the forewings is 16–23 mm. "Forewing dull white, finely dusted with blackish in the intervals, sometimes slightly rufous-tinged; outer line represented by a row of blackish dots, often obsolete: hindwing whitish washed with grey; sometimes with an outer series of dark spots; — the ab. crassicornis Haw.has the black dusting intensified on both wings, forming, in some instances, dark horizontal streaks in the forewing; the rows of spots in both wings strongly expressed; — ab. rufescens Tutt is the red form corresponding to lutosa Hbn. sometimes with, at others without, the rows of spots; for the more dusted red form, corresponding to ab. crassicornis Haw., Tutt has used the name rufescens-suffusa. The form occurring in Japan must be separated as a subspecies griseata subsp. nov [Warren]: in the males of this (I have not seen a female) the hindwings are dark grey beyond middle with the fringe pale: the forewings also are greyer ochreous with the pale veins more distinctly defined by dark scaling.2 males in Tring Museum from Ichikishiri, Yezo, August 1890, (Dr. Fritze)".

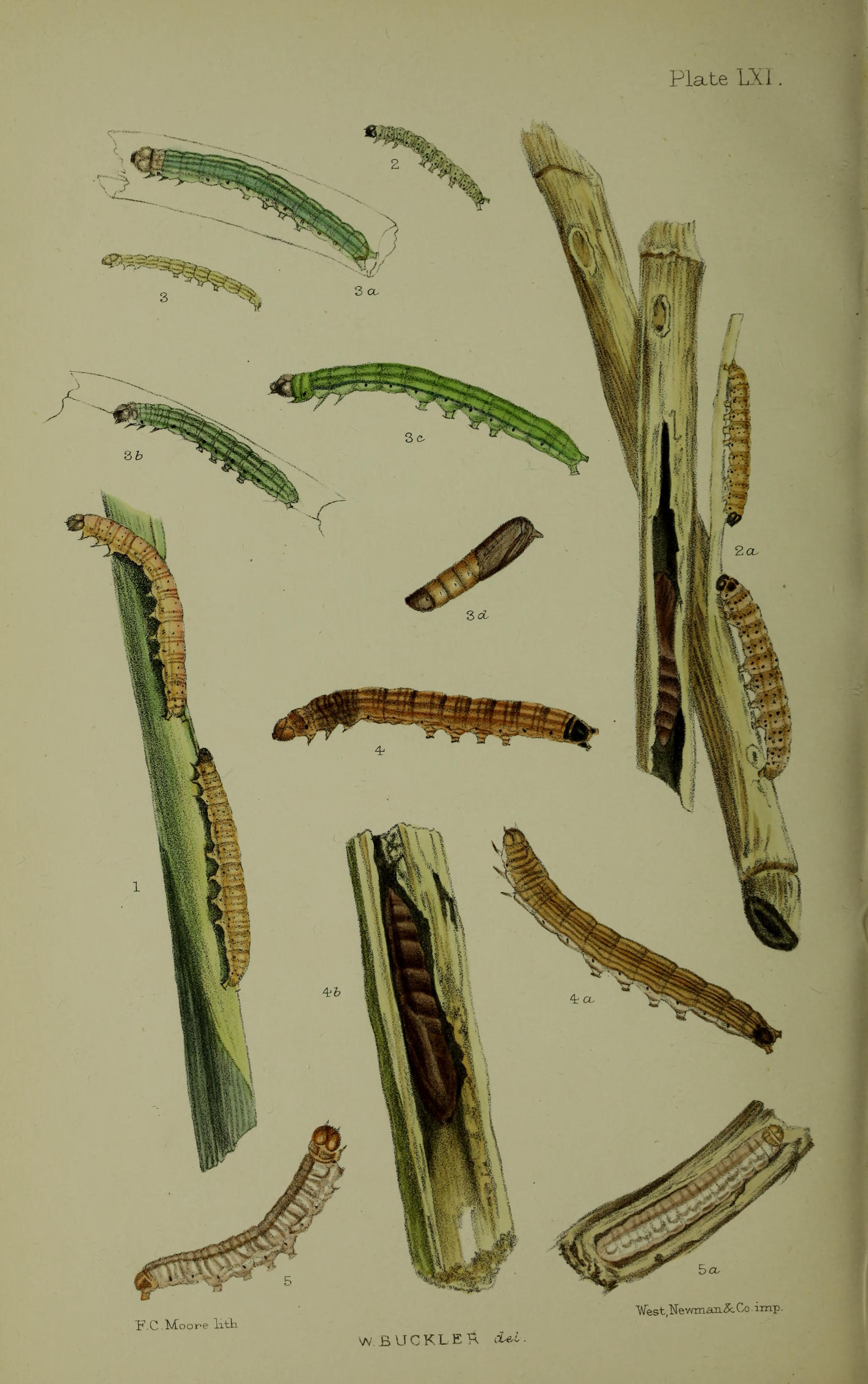
Figs 5, 5a larvae after final moult in lower parts of stems of Arundo phragmites

== Biology ==
The moth flies from July to November depending on the location.

Larva bone-colour with a pinkish tinge; head light brown: feeding underground in the roots of reeds (Phragmites species).
