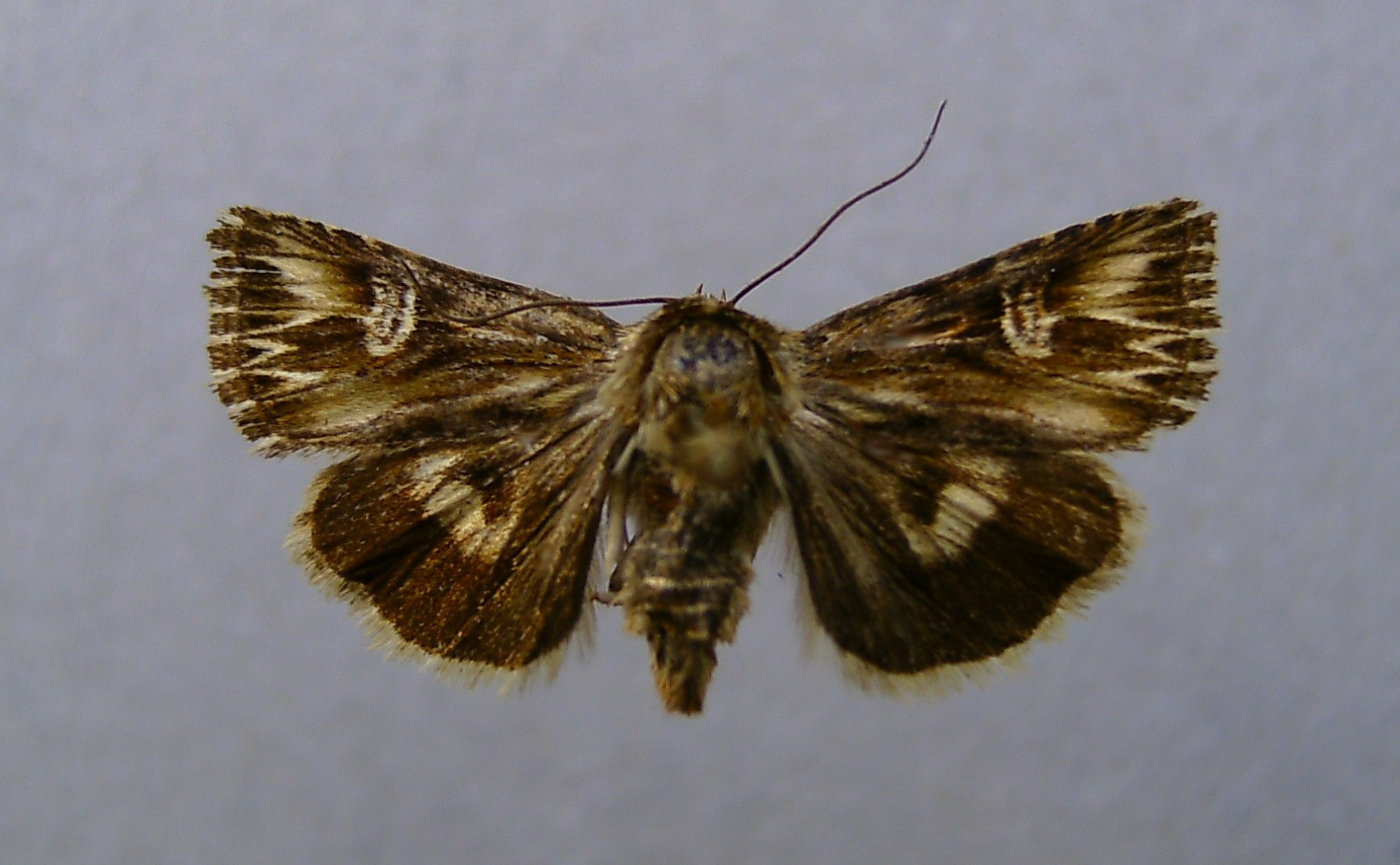

Scientific classification
- Domain: Eukaryota
- Kingdom: Animalia
- Phylum: Arthropoda
- Class: Insecta
- Order: Lepidoptera
- Superfamily: Noctuoidea
- Family: Noctuidae
- Genus: Actinotia
- Species: A. radiosa

Binomial name
- Actinotia radiosa (Esper, 1804)

Synonyms
- Phalaena (Noctua) radiosa Esper, 1804; Noctua lyncea Hübner, [1809]

= Actinotia radiosa =

Species of moth

Actinotia radiosa is a moth in the family Noctuidae. It is found in southern Europe and the southern parts of central Europe, Anotolia, southern Russia, and the Caucasus region. In mountainous areas it is found up to heights of 1,800 m (5,900 ft).

The wingspan is 28–36 mm (1.1–1.4 in). Adults are on wing from April to May and from July to August in two generations. There are mostly day active. Adults have been recorded feeding on flower nectar of various plants, including Vicia cracca, Salvia pratensis, Echium, Onobrychis, and Thymus. The larvae feed on the flowers and fruit of Hypericum species. They hide during the day.

== Description from Seitz ==
A. radiosa Esp. (= lyncea Hbn.) (15 d). Forewing olive brown; some pale horizontal streaks from base: orbicular stigma elongate, horizontal, narrow, pale-edged; reniform large, vertical, brown with white linear centre and outline; veins towards margin black, defined by pale olive and whitish, forming sharp wedge shaped markings separated by dark intervals, and produced as fine white pencils through the dark brown fringe; an interrupted pale outer fascia; hindwing black with a whitish outer fascia from costa to vein 2, crossed by black veins; cell lunule large, black: fringe white. -- Throughout southern Europe, and in Asia Minor and Armenia. — Larva reddish greybrown; dorsal and subdorsal lines dark with oblique streaks between them; lateral lines pale-yellow with a reddish tinge along centre, with an elongate blackish mark on each segment above it; thoracic and anal plates brown; head yellowish-brown; on Hypericum.
