= Metria cades =

Scientific classification
- Kingdom: Animalia
- Phylum: Arthropoda
- Class: Insecta
- Order: Lepidoptera
- Superfamily: Noctuoidea
- Family: Erebidae
- Genus: Metria
- Species: M. cades

Binomial name
- Metria cades (Druce, 1898)

Species of moth

Metria cades is a species of moth of the genus Metria in the family Erebidae, native to Central America.

== Habitat ==
Metria cades range includes Volcán Atitlán, Guatemala.
