= Radara =

Scientific classification
- Kingdom: Animalia
- Phylum: Arthropoda
- Class: Insecta
- Order: Lepidoptera
- Superfamily: Noctuoidea
- Family: Erebidae
- Subfamily: Calpinae
- Genus: Radara; Walker, 1862

Synonyms
- Rhaesena Walker, 1866; Chabora Walker, 1866; Symplusia Holland, 1894; Mecynoptera Schaus, 1913; Chirconia Schaus, 1916; Diodines Schaus, 1916; Matiloxis Schaus, 1916; Duriga Schaus, 1940

Genus of moths

Radara is a genus of moths of the family Erebidae. The genus was erected by Francis Walker in 1862.

== Species ==
- Radara helcida (Viette, 1961) Madagascar
- Radara infundens (Walker, [1863]) Borneo
- Radara prunescens (Hampson, 1902) southern Africa
- Radara subcupralis (Walker, [1866]) southern and western Africa to India
- Radara thermeola Hampson, 1926 southern Africa
- Radara vacillans Walker, 1862 southern Africa

== Former species ==
- Radara anartoides is now known as Cecharismena anartoides (Walker, 1865)
