= Rhynchina =

Scientific classification
- Kingdom: Animalia
- Phylum: Arthropoda
- Class: Insecta
- Order: Lepidoptera
- Superfamily: Noctuoidea
- Family: Erebidae
- Subfamily: Hypeninae
- Genus: Rhynchina; Guenée in Boisduval & Guenée, 1854

Synonyms
- Ceraptila Guenée, 1854; Rhabinogana Draudt, 1950

Genus of moths

Rhynchina is a genus of moths of the family Erebidae, that was formerly placed in the Noctuidae. The genus was erected by Achille Guenée in 1854.

== Species ==
- Rhynchina albidula Warren, 1913 Kashmir
- Rhynchina albiluna Hampson, 1902 Sikkim
- Rhynchina albiscripta Hampson, 1916 Somalia
- Rhynchina angustalis (Warren, 1888) India
- Rhynchina aroa Bethune-Baker, 1908 New Guinea
- Rhynchina buchanani Rothschild, 1921 Niger
- Rhynchina canariensis Pinker, 1962 Canary Islands
- Rhynchina canestriata Hacker, 2004
- Rhynchina columbaris (Butler, 1889) Dharmsala
- Rhynchina comias Meyrick, 1902 New Guinea
- Rhynchina coniodes Vari, 1962 South Africa
- Rhynchina cramboides (Butler, 1879) Japan
- Rhynchina crassisquamata Hampson, 1910 Rhodesia
- Rhynchina deflexa (Saalmüller, 1891)
- Rhynchina desquammata Strand, 1920 Formosa
- Rhynchina endoleuca Hampson, 1916
- Rhynchina equalisella (Walker, 1863)
- Rhynchina ethiopica Hacker, 2011
- Rhynchina ferreipars Hampson, 1907 Ichang, India (Mumbai)
- Rhynchina herbuloti Viette, 1965 Madagascar
- Rhynchina innotata Warren, 1913 Kashmir
- Rhynchina inornata (Butler, 1886) Australia
- Rhynchina leucodonia Hampson, 1912 Madras
- Rhynchina leucodonta Hampson, 1910 Rhodesia
- Rhynchina lithinata Wileman & West, 1930 Philippines
- Rhynchina martonhreblayi Lödl, 1999
- Rhynchina obliqualis (Kollar, 1844)
- Rhynchina paliscia Bethune-Baker, 1911 Nigeria
- Rhynchina pallidinota Hampson, 1907 Sikkim
- Rhynchina perangulata Hampson, 1916 Somalia
- Rhynchina pervulgaris C. Swinhoe, 1885 India (Poona, Bombay, Mhow)
- Rhynchina pionealis Guenée, 1854 Dharmsala
- Rhynchina plusioides Butler, 1889 Dharmsala
- Rhynchina poecilopa Vari, 1962 South Africa
- Rhynchina poliopera Hampson, 1902
- Rhynchina reniferalis (Guenée, 1854) South Africa
- Rhynchina revolutalis (Zeller, 1852)
- Rhynchina sagittalis (Rebel, 1948)
- Rhynchina sahariensis Rothschild, 1921 Niger
- Rhynchina striga (Felder & Rogenhofer, 1874) Himalaya
- Rhynchina talhamica Wiltshire, 1982 Arabia, Kenya
- Rhynchina taruensis Butler, 1898 Kenya
- Rhynchina tenuipalpis Hampson, 1891 Nilgiri
- Rhynchina tinctalis (Zeller, 1852) Sierra Leone, South Africa
- Rhynchina tripunctigera Berio, 1977 Formosa
- Rhynchina yemenitica Hacker, 2011
