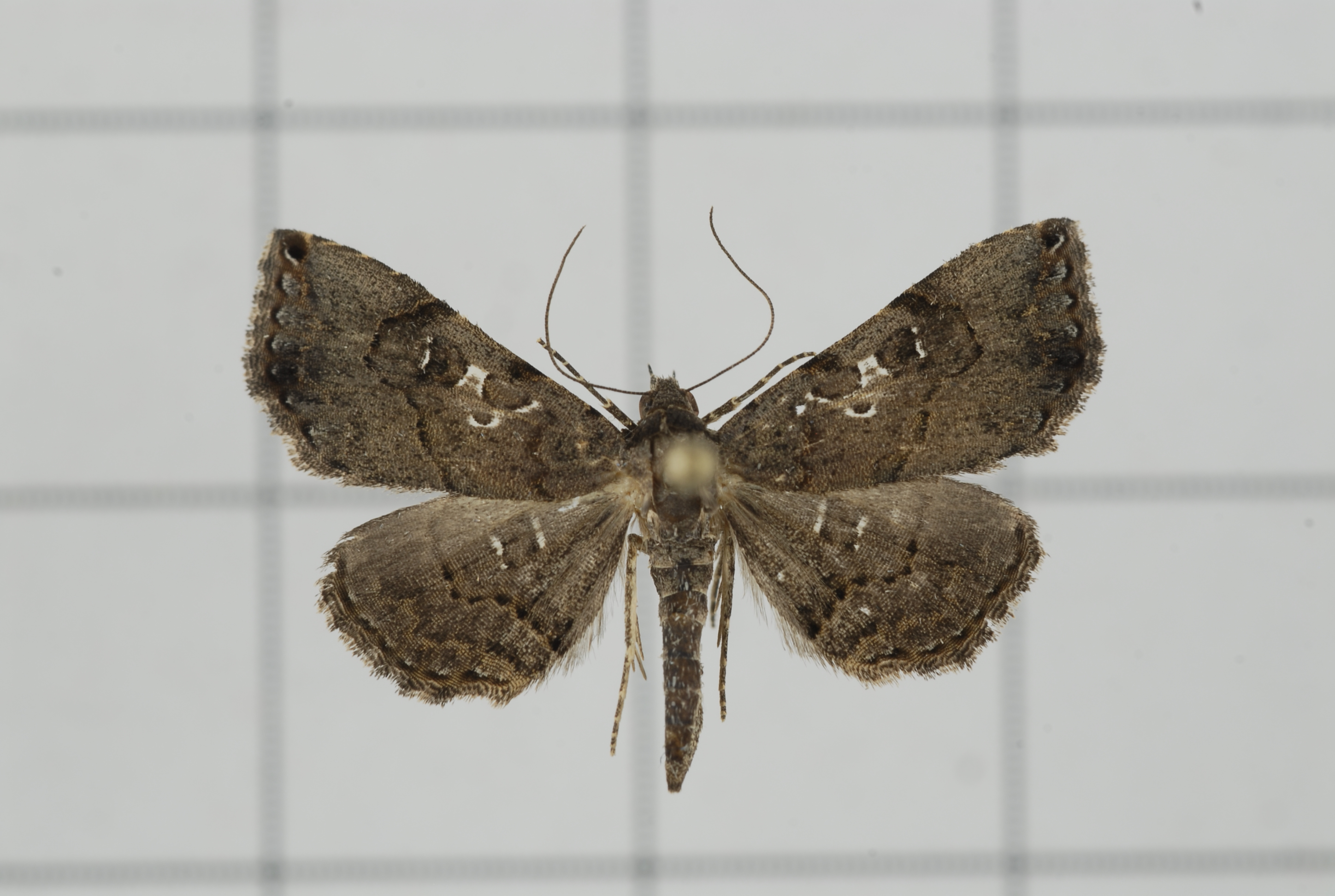

Scientific classification
- Kingdom: Animalia
- Phylum: Arthropoda
- Clade: Pancrustacea
- Class: Insecta
- Order: Lepidoptera
- Superfamily: Noctuoidea
- Family: Erebidae
- Genus: Rhesala
- Species: R. imparata

Binomial name
- Rhesala imparata Walker, 1865

Synonyms
- Rhesala imparata Walker, 1858; Homoptera diminutiva Walker, 1865

= Rhesala imparata =

Species of moth

Rhesala imparata is a moth of the family Erebidae first described by Francis Walker in 1865. It is sometimes referred to as an Albizia defoliator. It is found in Sri Lanka, India, Taiwan, Singapore and Borneo.

The wingspan of the adult is 10–11 mm. The body of the caterpillar is cylindrical, slightly wider centrally and a dull, wrinkled, a plain watery grass greenish. Head shining light orange, with long brown setae. Pupation takes place in a close, ovoid silk cocoon. Pupa lack a bloom. Caterpillars are known to feed on Acacia, Albizia, Delonix, Tamarindus and Samanea species. The moth was newly discovered as a pest on Boswellia serrata from India.
