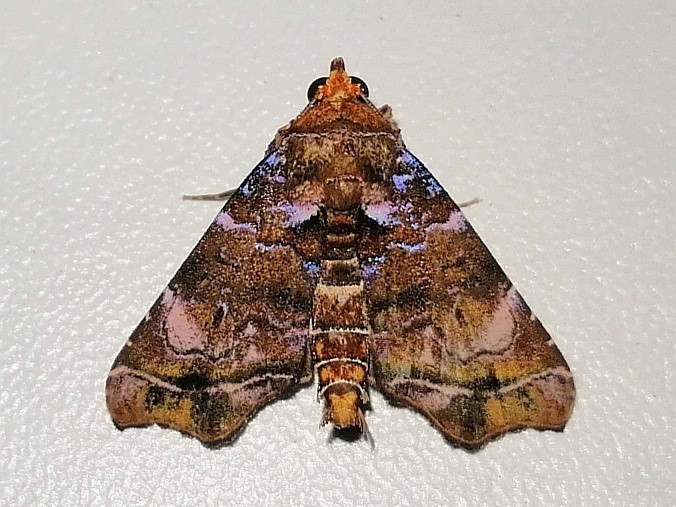
- Cecharismena melicerta

Scientific classification
- Domain: Eukaryota
- Kingdom: Animalia
- Phylum: Arthropoda
- Class: Insecta
- Order: Lepidoptera
- Superfamily: Noctuoidea
- Family: Erebidae
- Subfamily: Boletobiinae
- Genus: Cecharismena; Möschler, 1890

Synonyms
- List: Chabora Walker, [1866]; Mecynoptera Schaus, 1913; Zagorista Schaus, 1916; Chirconia Schaus, 1916; Diodines Schaus, 1916; Duriga Schaus, 1916; Matiloxis Schaus, 1916

= Cecharismena =

Genus of moths

Cecharismena is a genus of moths in the family Erebidae. The genus was erected by Möschler in 1890.

== Taxonomy ==
The genus has previously been classified in the subfamily Phytometrinae within Erebidae or in the subfamily Calpinae of the family Noctuidae.

=== Species ===
The following species are recognised in the genus Cecharismena:

- Cecharismena abarusalis Walker, 1859
- Cecharismena anartoides (Walker, 1865)
- Cecharismena aquilalis (Schaus, 1916)
- Cecharismena byrsopa (Hampson, 1926)
- Cecharismena cara Möschler, 1890
- Cecharismena convergens (Schaus, 1913)
- Cecharismena defecta (Dyar, 1912)
- Cecharismena erythrolopha (Hampson, 1926)
- Cecharismena flaviceps (Hampson, 1926)
- Cecharismena guianalis (Schaus, 1916)
- Cecharismena incerta (Sepp, [1840])
- Cecharismena inoa (Schaus, 1916)
- Cecharismena jalapena (Schaus, 1906)
- Cecharismena josealis (Schaus, 1916)
- Cecharismena lilaceata (Dognin, 1914)
- Cecharismena melicerta (Schaus, 1913)
- Cecharismena nealcesalis (Walker, 1859)
- Cecharismena nectarea Möschler, 1890
- Cecharismena nezeila (Schaus, 1906)
- Cecharismena phaenoceps (Hampson, 1926)
- Cecharismena rubromarginata (Schaus, 1906)
- Cecharismena rufinalis (Walker, [1866])
- Cecharismena tauralis (Walker, [1866])
- Cecharismena tepetlalis (Schaus, 1916)
- Cecharismena tincturalis (Kaye, 1925)
- Cecharismena tortola (Felder & Rogenhofer, 1874)
- Cecharismena trilinea (Schaus, 1916)
- Cecharismena zoum (Dyar, 1914)
