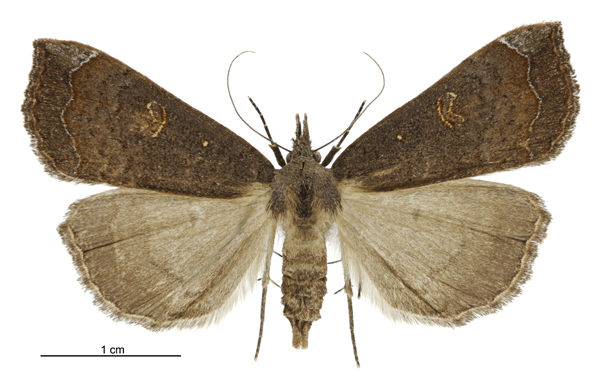
- Female
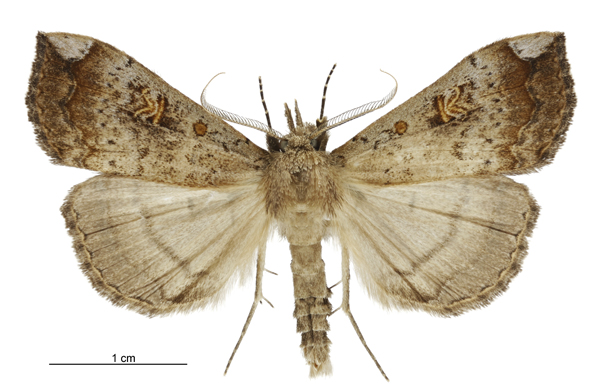
- Male

Scientific classification
- Kingdom: Animalia
- Phylum: Arthropoda
- Clade: Pancrustacea
- Class: Insecta
- Order: Lepidoptera
- Superfamily: Noctuoidea
- Family: Erebidae
- Genus: Rhapsa
- Species: R. scotosialis

Binomial name
- Rhapsa scotosialis Walker, 1866

Synonyms
- Herminia lilacina Butler, 1877

= Rhapsa scotosialis =

Species of moth endemic to New Zealand

Rhapsa scotosialis, the slender owlet moth, is a moth of the family Erebidae under the superfamily Noctuoidea. This species is endemic to New Zealand and is found throughout the country. It is regarded as one of the most common forest moths found in New Zealand. The larval host species for R. scotosialis is Piper excelsum.

== Taxonomy ==
This species was first described by Francis Walker in 1866 from specimens collected in Nelson by T. R. Oxley. It was also described by Arthur Gardiner Butler in 1877 using the name Herminia lilacina. This latter name was subsequently synonymised by Edward Meyrick in 1887. In both 1898 and 1928 George Hudson discussed and illustrated this species in his books New Zealand moths and butterflies (Macro-lepidoptera) and The butterflies and moths of New Zealand. The male holotype specimen is held at the Natural History Museum, London.

== Description ==
The adults of this species were described by George Hudson as follows:

The expansion of the wings is 1 3/8 inches. The fore-wings have the costa considerably arched towards the apex, and the termen is bowed outwards in the middle; the colour is pale brown in the male and dark brown in the female; there are several obscure black marks near the base; the orbicular is very small, orange or pale grey outlined in black, the claviform is absent, the reniform is conspicuous, the outer edge is much indented, the inner edge is outlined with dull orange-red, there is a black blotch between the orbicular and the reniform; beyond the reniform there is a carved transverse line enveloping a series of minute black dots, then a very conspicuous wavy transverse line shaded towards the base of the wing; there is a pale triangular area at the apex, and a series of small crescentic dark brown markings on the termen; the cilia are dark brown. The hind-wings are greyish-ochreous; there is a rather faint line across the middle, followed by a broad shade; a series of small crescentic marks is situated on the termen; the cilia are dark greyish-ochreous. The antenna of the male are strongly bipectinated. The female is considerably darker, the markings are less distinct and numerous, and there is no black blotch between the orbicular and the reniform.

Both the male and female are variable in the depth of colour and newly emerged specimens can have a purplish tinge to their forewings.

== Distribution and habitat ==
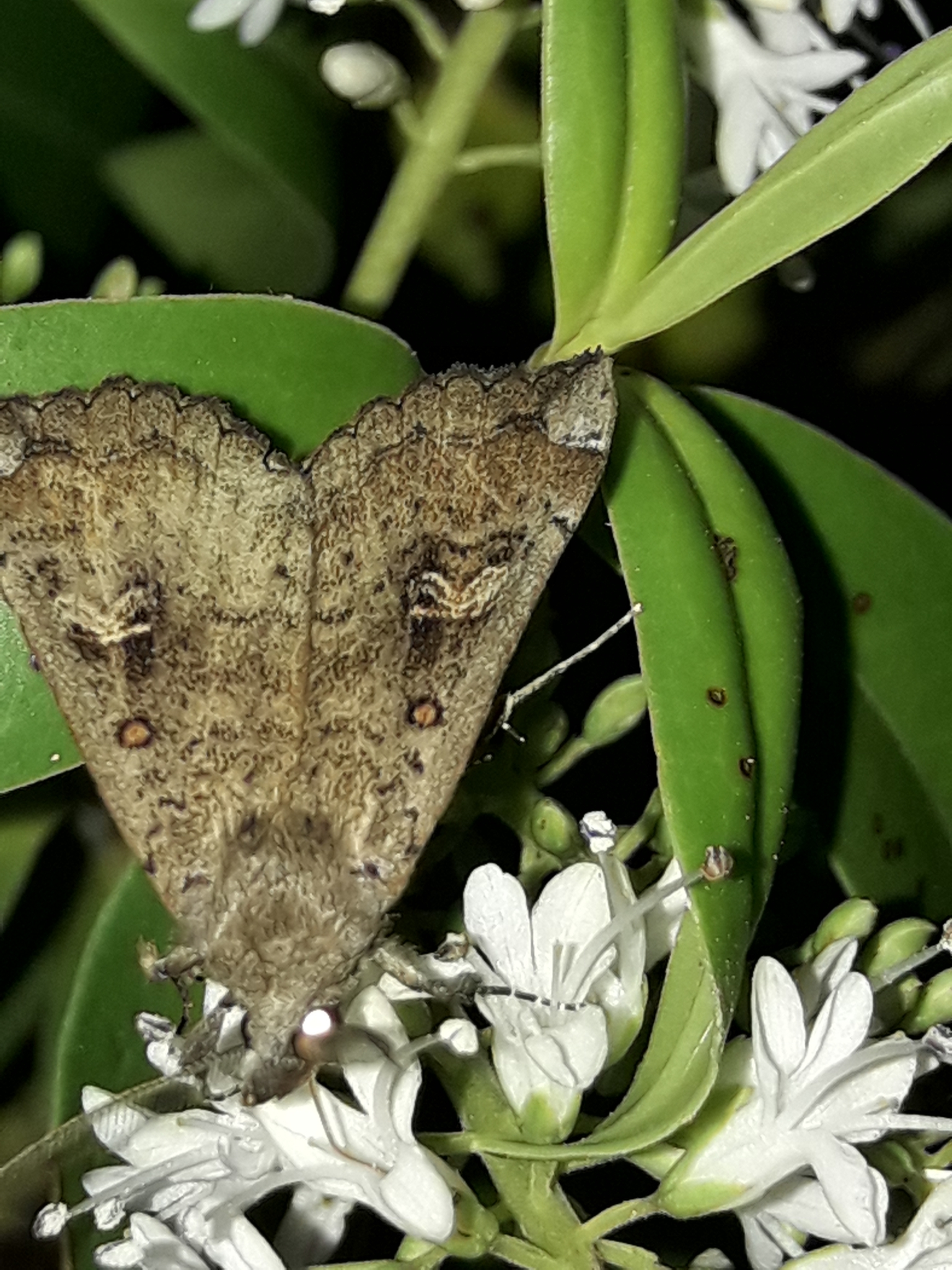
Observation of Rhapsa scotosialis

This species is endemic to New Zealand and can be found throughout the country. It inhabits native forest and is one of the most common forest moths found in New Zealand.

== Life stages ==
The eggs of R. scotosialis are round and slightly flattened on their underside and are either grey blue or yellow when freshly laid and turn a dull purple colour after a couple of days. It takes approximately 20 days before the larvae emerge. The caterpillar has a brown head and a white body. When fully grown the larva is a deep brown colour and is slightly over 1 inch in length. Each segment of the body of the caterpillar has a small round protuberance from which come a tuft of hairs. The larva pupates in a cocoon hidden in leaf litter on soil.

== Behaviour ==
The larvae of this species are difficult to observe as they move infrequently during the day. Adults are on the wing throughout the year. They are night flying but can be disturbed during the day by beating the dead fronds of tree ferns. They are attracted to light and can be observed at night feeding on white rata blossoms. They have been collected via a mercury vapour light trap.

== Host species ==
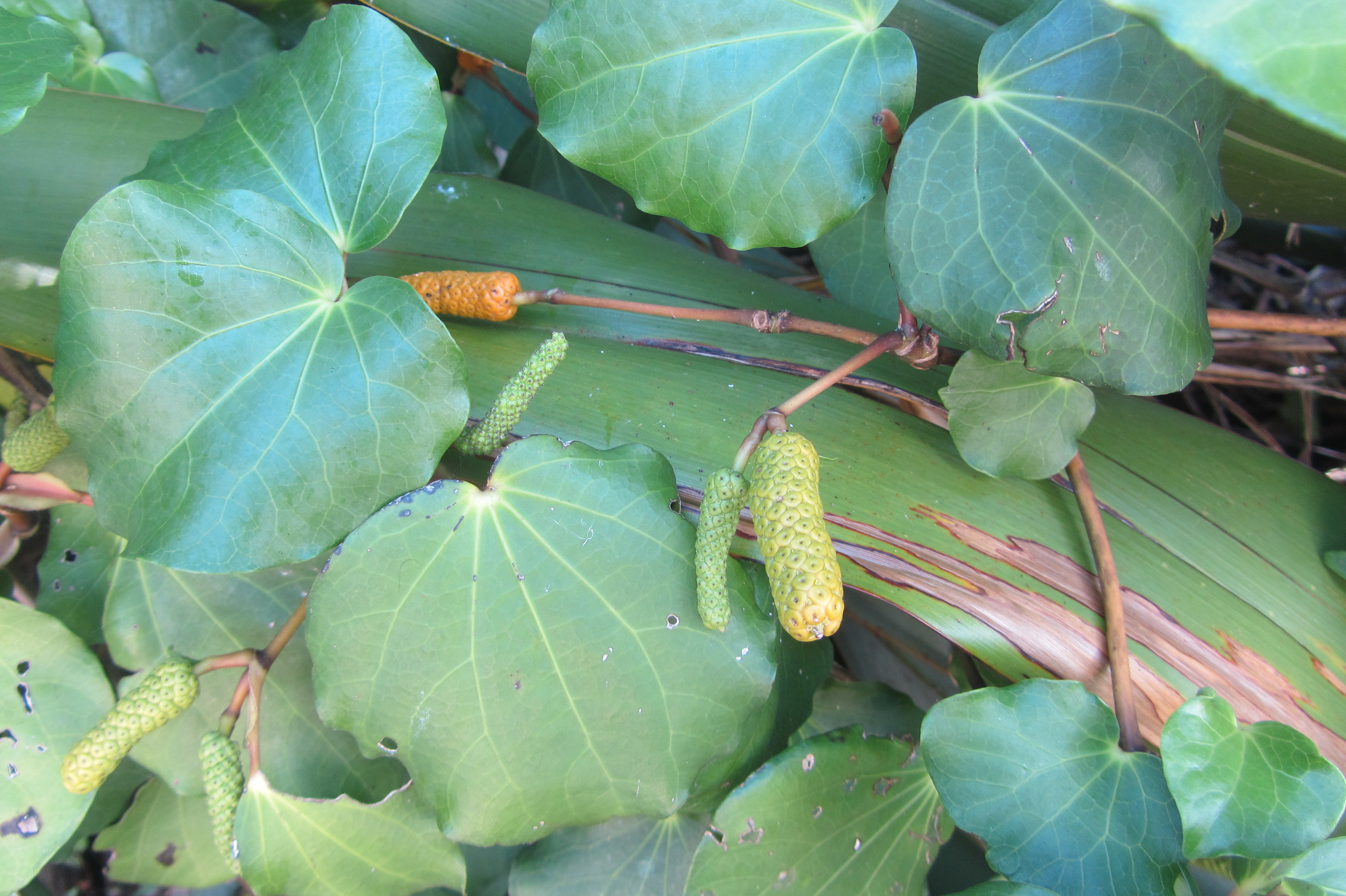
Larval host species, Piper excelsum.

A host species for the larvae of R. scotosialis is Piper excelsum. The larvae are also known to feed on fallen leaves of various native trees as well as on Pinus radiata.
