= Rhabinopteryx subtilis =

Scientific classification
- Domain: Eukaryota
- Kingdom: Animalia
- Phylum: Arthropoda
- Class: Insecta
- Order: Lepidoptera
- Superfamily: Noctuoidea
- Family: Noctuidae
- Genus: Rhabinopteryx
- Species: R. subtilis

Binomial name
- Rhabinopteryx subtilis (Mabille, 1888)

Synonyms
- Epimecia subtilis Mabille, 1888

Species of moth

Rhabinopteryx subtilis is a moth of the family Noctuidae. The species was first described by Paul Mabille in 1888. It is found from Morocco along the northern African coast of the Mediterranean Sea (including Malta) to Egypt, the Arabian Peninsula, Iraq, Iran and Israel.

Adults are on wing from February to April. There is one generation per year.

The larvae feed on Plantago albicans.
