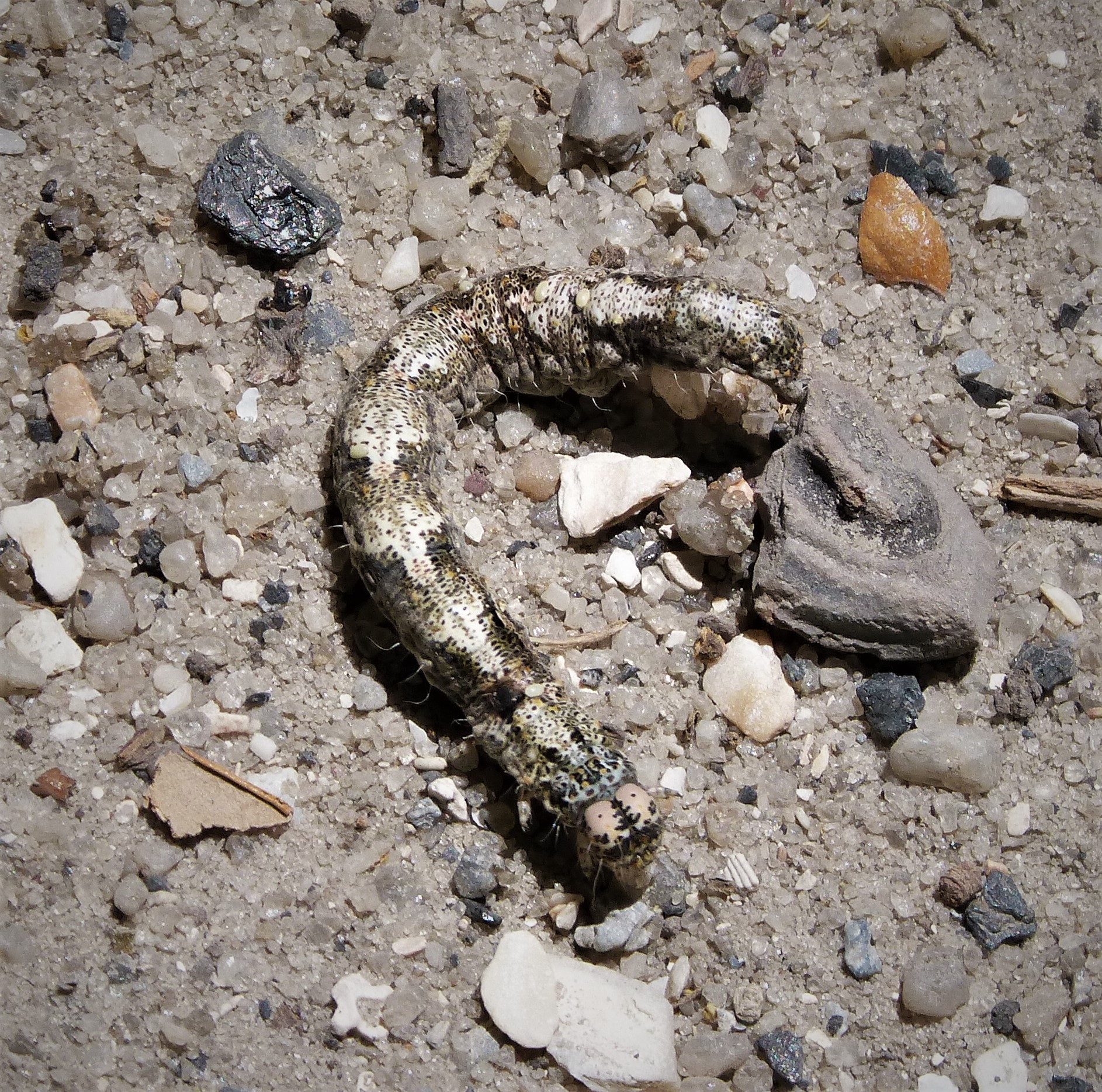

Scientific classification
- Kingdom: Animalia
- Phylum: Arthropoda
- Class: Insecta
- Order: Lepidoptera
- Superfamily: Noctuoidea
- Family: Erebidae
- Genus: Metria
- Species: M. amella

Binomial name
- Metria amella (Guenée, 1852)

= Metria amella =

Species of moth

Metria amella, the live oak metria moth, is a species of moth in the family Erebidae.

The MONA or Hodges number for Metria amella is 8666.
