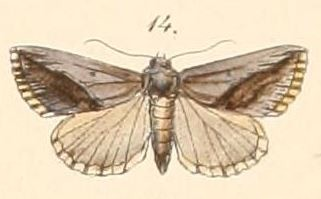

Scientific classification
- Domain: Eukaryota
- Kingdom: Animalia
- Phylum: Arthropoda
- Class: Insecta
- Order: Lepidoptera
- Superfamily: Noctuoidea
- Family: Erebidae
- Genus: Zekelita
- Species: Z. equalisella

Binomial name
- Zekelita equalisella Walker, 1863

Synonyms
- Rhynchina equalisella (Walker, 1863); Rhynchina caesa Distant, 1898; Thalpochares squamilinea Felder & Rogenhofer, 1874; Eublemma squamilinea (Felder & Rogenhofer, 1874); Zekelita squamilinea (Felder & Rogenhofer, 1874)

= Zekelita equalisella =

Species of moth

Zekelita equalisella is a species of moth in the family Erebidae. It is found in Southern Africa (South Africa, Lesotho, Zimbabwe).
