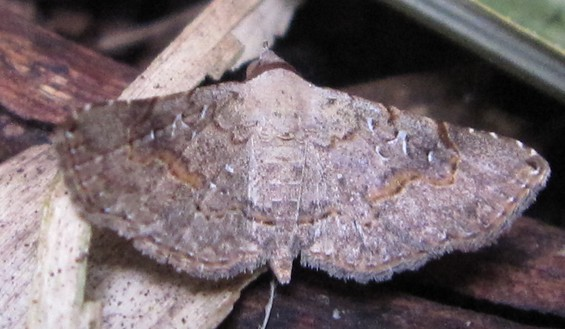

Scientific classification
- Kingdom: Animalia
- Phylum: Arthropoda
- Class: Insecta
- Order: Lepidoptera
- Superfamily: Noctuoidea
- Family: Erebidae
- Genus: Rhesala
- Species: R. moestalis

Binomial name
- Rhesala moestalis (Walker, 1866)

Synonyms
- Magulaba moestalis Walker, 1866; Hingula figurata Moore, 1885; Rimulia malgassica von Heyden, 1891; Cerynea ragazzii Berio, 1937

= Rhesala moestalis =

Species of moth

Rhesala moestalis is a species of moth of the family Erebidae first described by Francis Walker in 1866. It is found throughout subtropical Africa, from Sierra Leone in the west to Somalia in the east and South Africa in the south. It is also found on most of the African Indian Ocean islands. and in South and South-East Asia.

They have a wingspan of 14–20 mm.

The larvae feed on Fabaceae species, such as Acacia mellifera, Acacia tortilis and Albizia lebbeck. In India they have been recorded as a pest of nursery and young shade trees in tea plantations with a preference for Albizia odoratissima, Albizia procera as well as Albizia lebbeck.

== Original description ==
George Hampson described them in The Fauna of British India, Including Ceylon and Burma in 1894 as follows:

Dark fuscous brown with a greyish tinge; the head and collar dark red- brown. Fore wing with some dark specks on costa; waved ante- and postmedial lines, the latter excurved round cell; the orbicular and reniform large and indistinct and more or less prominently defined by hyaline lines; a dark spot at apex; a marginal series of black specks. Hind wing with a cell-spot with hyaline specks on its edges; a sinuous medial line with dark specks on it; traces of a pale submarginal lunulate line; an indistinct lunulate red-brown marginal band. Some specimens have a dark patch on disk of fore wing; others have the black-speckled medial line of hind wing double towards inner margin. Hab. W.Africa; Japan; throughout India and Ceylon. Exp. 18-24 millim.
