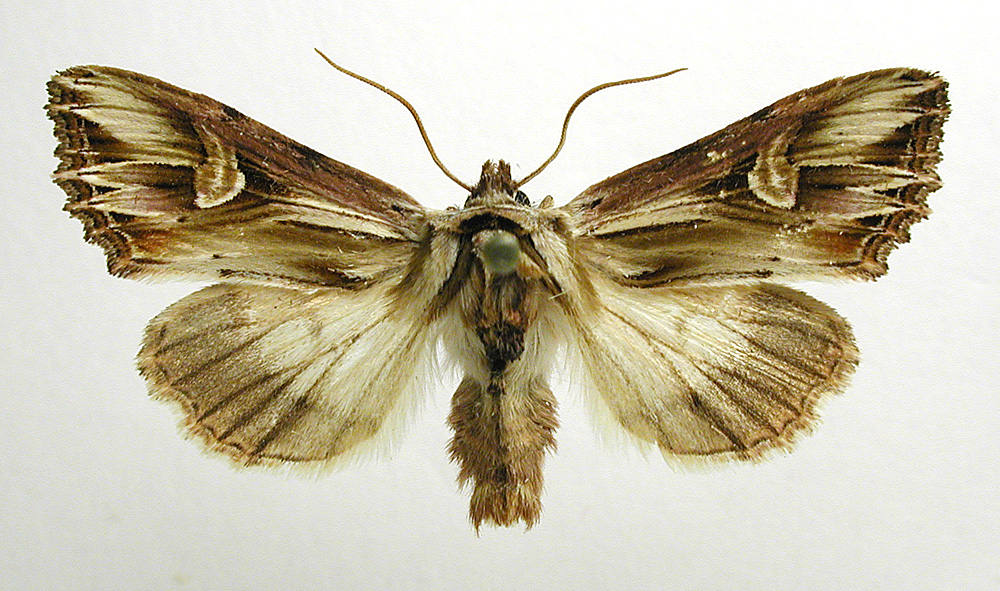

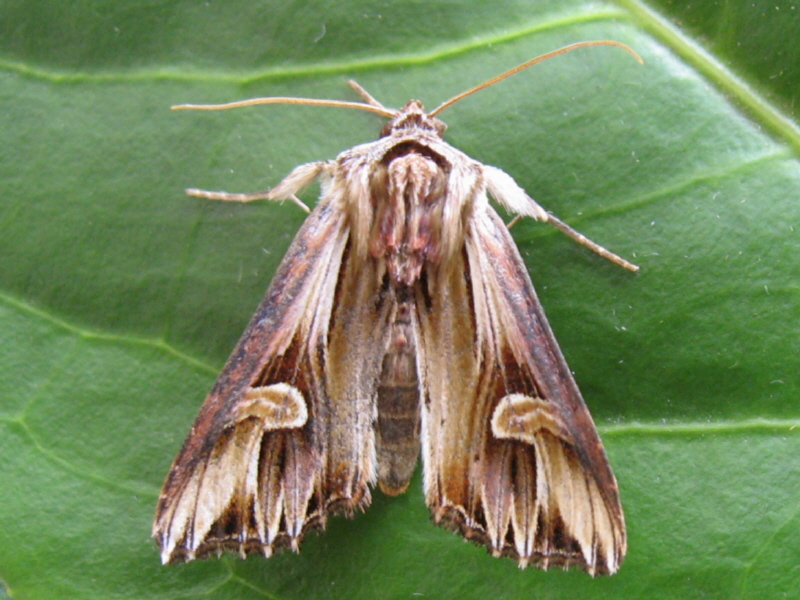

Scientific classification
- Kingdom: Animalia
- Phylum: Arthropoda
- Class: Insecta
- Order: Lepidoptera
- Superfamily: Noctuoidea
- Family: Noctuidae
- Genus: Actinotia
- Species: A. polyodon

Binomial name
- Actinotia polyodon (Clerck, 1759)

Synonyms
- Phalaena polyodon Clerck, 1759; Phalaena perspicillaris Linnaeus, 1761

= Actinotia polyodon =

Species of moth

Actinotia polyodon, the purple cloud, is a moth of the family Noctuidae. It is found in much of the Palearctic realm, from Europe to Russia and Japan.

A. polyodon Cl. (= perspicillaris L.) (15 d). Forewing bone-colour suffused with olive brown along costa and inner margin and interrupted along termen; the reniform stigma also placed on an olive brown cloud: costa and space between veins 2 and 4 tinged with purplish pink; a black streak from base in submedian fold and a double one from inner margin near base; reniform stigma large, pale olive with linear centre and outline creamy white; veins towards margin dark, forming centre of wedgeshaped marks, 3, 4 and 7, 8 broadly edged with ground colour and cutting the dark fringe; outer line marked by dark dots on veins: hindwing bone-colour with broad brownish margin and blackish veins. - Larva red-brown, dotted with black; a subdorsal row of oblique brown marks; dorsal and spiracular lines yellow; head brown. The wingspan is 31–36 mm.

== Biology ==
Adults are on wing from May to August in two generations. At times there is a partial third generation from September to October.

The larvae feed on perforate St John's-wort (Hypericum perforatum) and liquorice milkvetch (Astragalus glycyphyllos).
