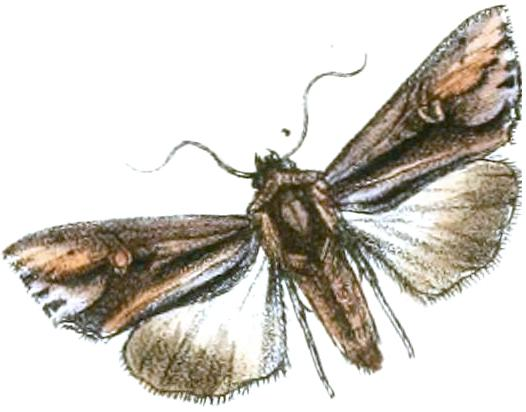

Scientific classification
- Kingdom: Animalia
- Phylum: Arthropoda
- Class: Insecta
- Order: Lepidoptera
- Superfamily: Noctuoidea
- Family: Noctuidae
- Genus: Actinotia
- Species: A. intermediata

Binomial name
- Actinotia intermediata (Bremer, 1861)

Synonyms
- Chloantha intermediata Bremer, 1861; Auchmis sikkimensis Moore, 1867

= Actinotia intermediata =

Species of moth

Actinotia intermediata is a species of moth of the family Noctuidae. It is found in Asia, including India, Sri Lanka and Taiwan.

== Description ==
Its wingspan is about 38 mm. Head and thorax whitish, marked with red brown and dark brown. Abdomen pale with a pinkish-ochreous tinge. Forewings whitish, where the costal area suffused with brown and pinkish. Cell with fine dark streaks in it. A prominent black fascia found below the cell and another above inner margin. The inner area and its surrounding the lower part of the reniform, which is white and ochreous, suffused with chestnut and olive browns. Some black streaks can be seen on the oblique apical fascia, and some on outer margin below the middle. Cilia chestnut coloured, which intersected by pale teeth. Hindwings are white, where the veins and outer are fuscous suffused.
