= Rhynchodia mesophaea =

Scientific classification
- Kingdom: Animalia
- Phylum: Arthropoda
- Class: Insecta
- Order: Lepidoptera
- Superfamily: Noctuoidea
- Family: Noctuidae
- Subfamily: Acontiinae
- Genus: Rhynchodia; Hampson, 1910
- Species: R. mesophaea

Binomial name
- Rhynchodia mesophaea Hampson, 1910

Species of moth

Rhynchodia mesophaea is the only species in the monotypic moth genus Rhynchodia of the family Noctuidae. It is found in the Indian state of Kerala. Both the genus and species were first described by George Hampson in 1910.
