= Rufachola =

Scientific classification
- Domain: Eukaryota
- Kingdom: Animalia
- Phylum: Arthropoda
- Class: Insecta
- Order: Lepidoptera
- Superfamily: Noctuoidea
- Family: Noctuidae
- Subfamily: Cuculliinae
- Genus: Rufachola

Genus of moths

Rufachola is a genus of moths of the family Noctuidae.

== Notes ==
- Natural History Museum Lepidoptera genus database
