= Reticulana =

Scientific classification
- Domain: Eukaryota
- Kingdom: Animalia
- Phylum: Arthropoda
- Class: Insecta
- Order: Lepidoptera
- Superfamily: Noctuoidea
- Family: Erebidae
- Subfamily: Calpinae
- Genus: Reticulana; Bethune-Baker, 1906
- Species: R. costilinea

Binomial name
- Reticulana costilinea Bethune-Baker, 1906

Genus of moths

Reticulana is a monotypic moth genus of the family Erebidae. Its only species, Reticulana costilinea, is found on New Guinea. Both the genus and species were first described by George Thomas Bethune-Baker in 1906.
