= Zekelita =

Scientific classification
- Kingdom: Animalia
- Phylum: Arthropoda
- Class: Insecta
- Order: Lepidoptera
- Superfamily: Noctuoidea
- Family: Erebidae
- Subfamily: Hypeninae
- Genus: Zekelita; Walker, 1863

Synonyms
- Rhynchodontodes Warren, 1913; Ravalita Lödl & Mayerl, 1997

Genus of moths

Zekelita is a genus of moths of the family Erebidae. The genus was erected by Francis Walker in 1863.

- Zekelita amseli (Wiltshire, 1961) Afghanistan
- Zekelita angulalis (Mabille, 1880) Madagascar
- Zekelita angulata (Walker, 1862) northern India, Kashmir, Dharmsala
- Zekelita antiqualis (Hübner, [1809]) south-eastern Europe, Turkey, Syria, Lebanon, Afghanistan
- Zekelita antistropha (Vari, 1962) southern Africa
- Zekelita biformatalis (Leech, 1900)
- Zekelita chalcias (T. P. Lucas, 1894) Queensland
- Zekelita cretacea (Warren, 1913) Kashmir
- Zekelita curvatula (Warren, 1913) Kashmir
- Zekelita diagonalis (Alphéraky, 1882) Tian-Shan
- Zekelita endoleuca (Hampson, 1916) Somalia
- Zekelita equalisella Walker, 1863 southern Africa
- Zekelita larseni (Wiltshire, 1983) Oman
- Zekelita mandarinalis (Leech, 1900)
- Zekelita orientis (Brandt, 1938) Iran
- Zekelita plusioides (Butler, 1879) Japan
- Zekelita poliopera (Hampson, 1902) southern Africa
- Zekelita ravalis (Herrich-Schäffer, [1851]) Cyprus, Turkey, Levant, Arabia, south-west Asia, India, southern Africa, Madagascar
- Zekelita ravulalis (Staudinger, 1878) southern Urals, Iraq, Iran, Israel, Tajikistan, Kazakhstan, Turkmenistan
- Zekelita sagittalis (Rebel, 1948) Egypt
- Zekelita sagittata (Butler, 1889) Dharmsala
- Zekelita schwingenschussi (Wagner, 1913) Ili
- Zekelita soricalis (Püngeler, 1909)
- Zekelita vartianae (Wiltshire, 1971) Afghanistan
