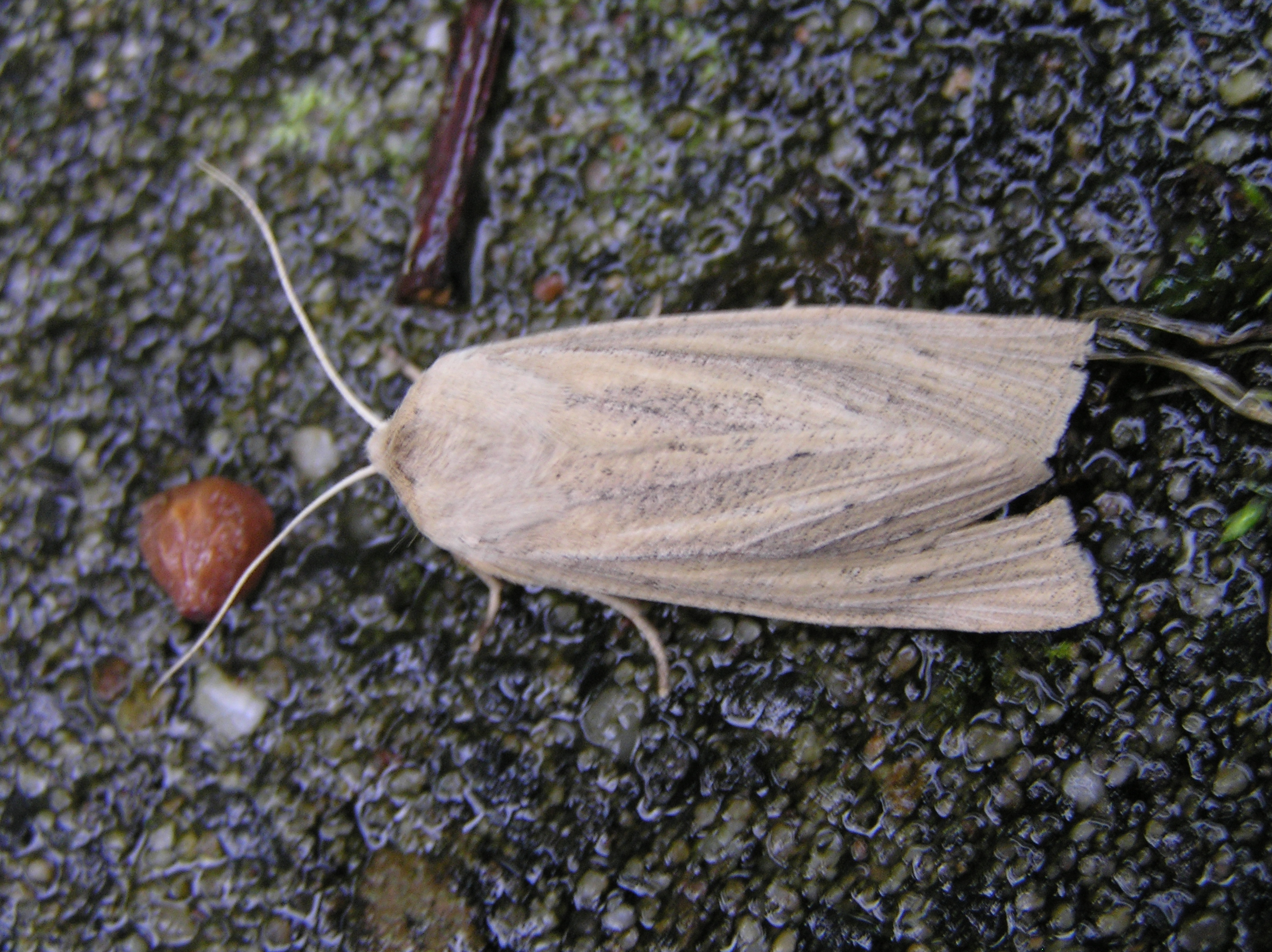

Scientific classification
- Domain: Eukaryota
- Kingdom: Animalia
- Phylum: Arthropoda
- Class: Insecta
- Order: Lepidoptera
- Superfamily: Noctuoidea
- Family: Noctuidae
- Tribe: Apameini
- Genus: Rhizedra; Warren, 1911

= Rhizedra =

Genus of moths

Rhizedra is a genus of moths of the family Noctuidae.

== Species ==
- Rhizedra lutosa (Hübner, [1803])
