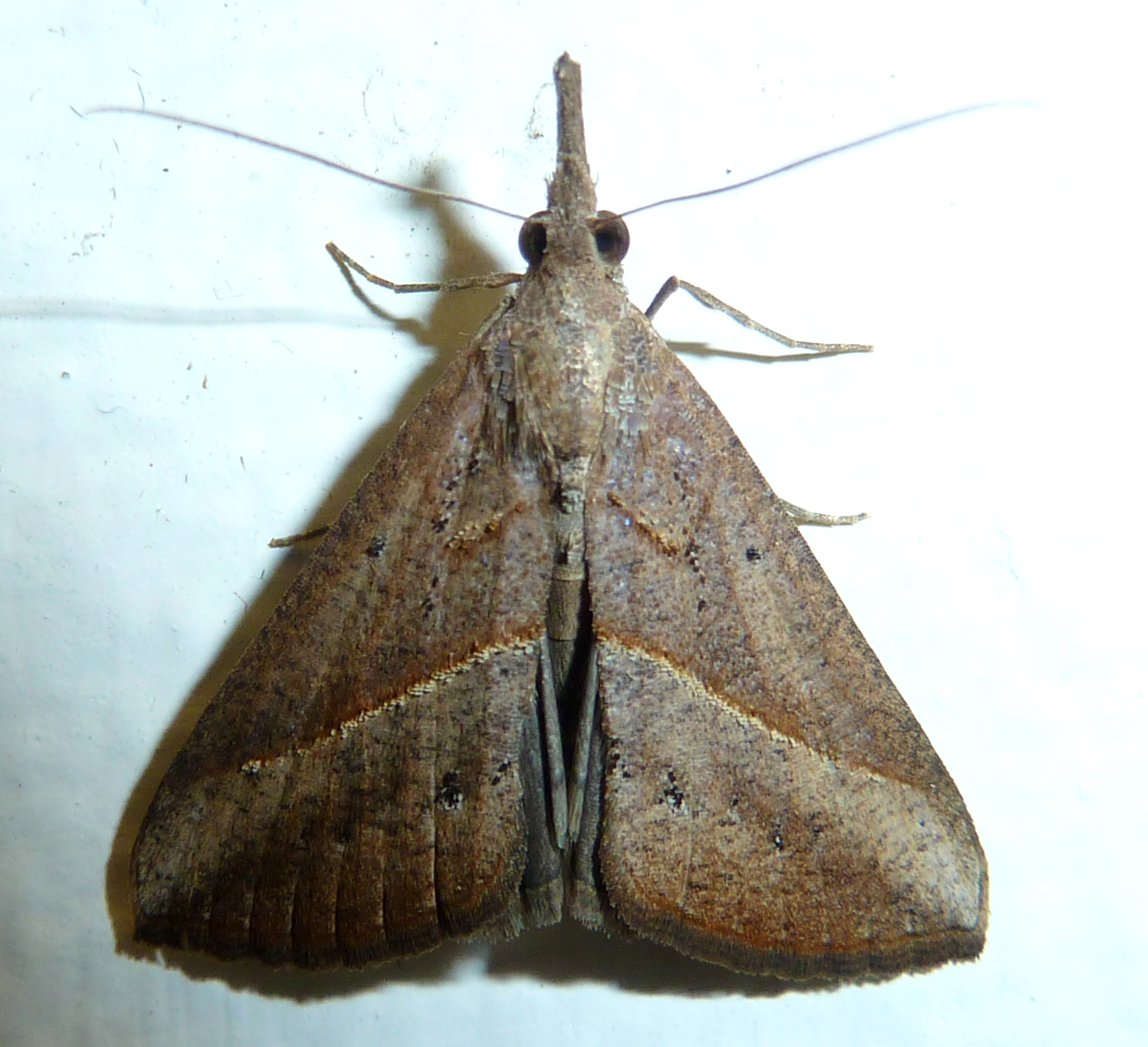

Scientific classification
- Kingdom: Animalia
- Phylum: Arthropoda
- Class: Insecta
- Order: Lepidoptera
- Superfamily: Noctuoidea
- Family: Erebidae
- Genus: Hypena
- Species: H. obacerralis

Binomial name
- Hypena obacerralis Walker, 1859

Synonyms
- Hypena longipalpalis Guenée, 1862; Hypena comes Butler, 1882; Rhynchina eremialis Swinhoe, 1889; Hypena invenustalis Swinhoe, 1890; Hypena ferriscitalis Walker, [1866] 1865; Hypena sordida Rothschild, 1921

= Hypena obacerralis =

Species of moth

Hypena obacerralis is a moth of the family Erebidae. It is found throughout Africa, the Middle East and South Asia (India, Sri Lanka) and Malaysia.

== Description ==
Its wingspan is about 24–30 mm. Forewings much broader. The outer margin less oblique. Raised tufts are slight. Body pale or dark greyish reddish brown. Forewings slightly irrorated (speckled) with dark scales. There are traces of an antemedial waved line and a dark speck in the cell present. An oblique slightly sinuous rusty line runs from the costa before apex to middle of inner margin. Traces of an oblique dark line can be seen from the apex, often with a more or less complete dark specks series found on it. Abdomen and hindwings fuscous. Body color slightly paler or darker according to the region.

Larva known to feed on Commelina pacifica plants.
