= Rhabinopteryx =

Scientific classification
- Kingdom: Animalia
- Phylum: Arthropoda
- Class: Insecta
- Order: Lepidoptera
- Superfamily: Noctuoidea
- Family: Noctuidae
- Genus: Rhabinopteryx; Christoph, 1889

Genus of moths

Rhabinopteryx is a genus of moths of the family Noctuidae.

== Species ==
- Rhabinopteryx subtilis (Mabille, 1888)
- Rhabinopteryx turanica (Erschoff, 1874)
