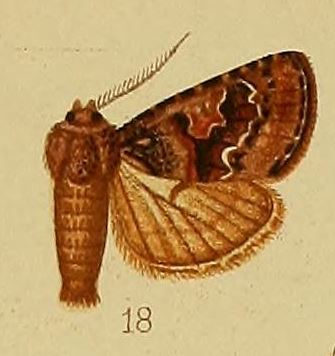
- Rhodochlaena cuneifera

Scientific classification
- Kingdom: Animalia
- Phylum: Arthropoda
- Class: Insecta
- Order: Lepidoptera
- Superfamily: Noctuoidea
- Family: Noctuidae
- Subfamily: Cuculliinae
- Genus: Rhodochlaena; Hampson, 1906

= Rhodochlaena =

Genus of moths

Rhodochlaena is a genus of moths of the family Noctuidae.

== Species ==
Some of the known species of this genus are:

- Rhodochlaena albidior Krüger, 2005 (from Lesotho)
- Rhodochlaena botonga (Felder & Rogenhofer, 1874) (from South Africa)
- Rhodochlaena cuneifera Hampson, 1910 (from Congo)
- Rhodochlaena dinshoense (Laporte, 1984) (from Ethiopia)
- Rhodochlaena hadenaeformis Krüger, 2005 (from Lesotho)
