= Radosa =

Scientific classification
- Domain: Eukaryota
- Kingdom: Animalia
- Phylum: Arthropoda
- Class: Insecta
- Order: Lepidoptera
- Superfamily: Noctuoidea
- Family: Erebidae
- Subfamily: Calpinae
- Genus: Radosa; Nye, 1975

Synonyms
- Osdara Walker, 1865

Genus of moths

Radosa is a genus of moths of the family Erebidae. The genus was described by Nye in 1975.

== Species ==
- Radosa albicosta (Hampson, 1924) Panama
- Radosa ordinata (Walker, 1865) Brazil (Amazonas)
