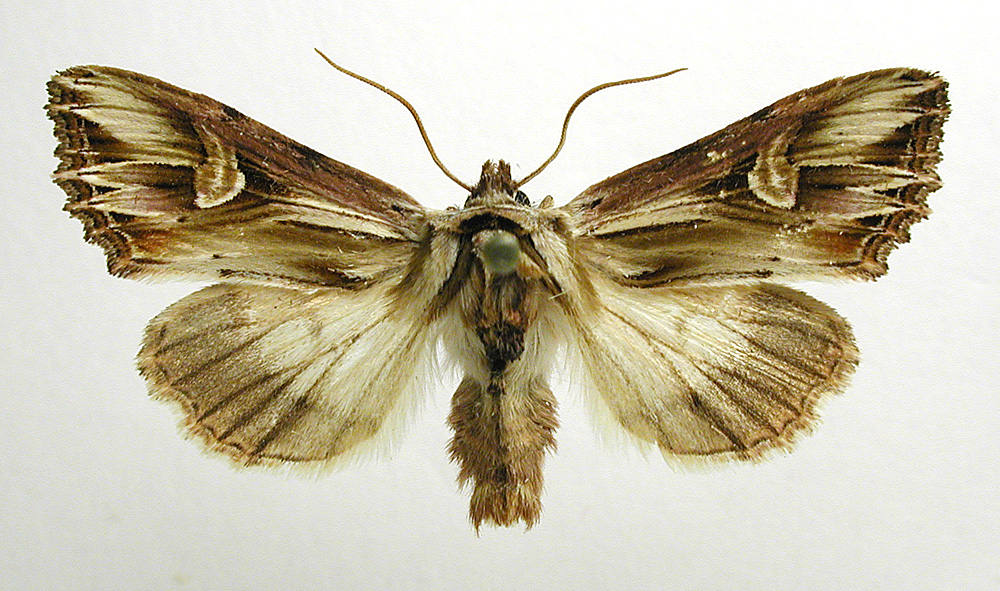
- Actinotia polyodon

Scientific classification
- Domain: Eukaryota
- Kingdom: Animalia
- Phylum: Arthropoda
- Class: Insecta
- Order: Lepidoptera
- Superfamily: Noctuoidea
- Family: Noctuidae
- Subfamily: Hadeninae
- Genus: Actinotia; Hübner, [1821]

Synonyms
- Radinotia Beck, 1996

= Actinotia =

Genus of moths

Actinotia is a genus of moths of the family Noctuidae.

The name Actinotia is derived from the Greek words akte (important or high place) and noton (backside), referring to the plume at the back of the body.

== Species ==
- Actinotia australis Holloway, 1989
- Actinotia conjuncta (Püngeler, 1900)
- Actinotia gnorima (Püngeler, 1907)
- Actinotia intermediata (Bremer, 1861)
- Actinotia polyodon – purple cloud (Clerck, 1759)
- Actinotia radiosa (Esper, [1804])
- Actinotia stevenswani Hreblay, Peregovits & Ronkay, 1999
