= Zekelita ravalis =

Scientific classification
- Kingdom: Animalia
- Phylum: Arthropoda
- Class: Insecta
- Order: Lepidoptera
- Superfamily: Noctuoidea
- Family: Erebidae
- Genus: Zekelita
- Species: Z. ravalis

Binomial name
- Zekelita ravalis (Herrich-Schäffer, 1851)

Synonyms
- Ravalita ravalis; Rhynchodontodes transcaspica Brandt, 1941; Hypena syriacalis Staudinger, 1892; Rhynchodontodes separata Warren, 1913; Hypena revolutalis Zeller, 1852; Rhynchodontodes pallida Draudt, 1936; Rhynchodontodes extorris Warren, 1913; Rhynchina eremialis Swinhoe, 1890; Hypena centralis Staudinger, 1892

Species of moth

Zekelita ravalis is a moth of the family Erebidae first described by Gottlieb August Wilhelm Herrich-Schäffer in 1851. It is found in the Near East and Middle East, Kazakhstan, Kirghizia, Pakistan, Afghanistan, Egypt, Oman, Saudi Arabia, Yemen, Bahrain and the Levant, Ethiopia, Kenya, Ghana, Madagascar, Somalia, South Africa and Zambia.
