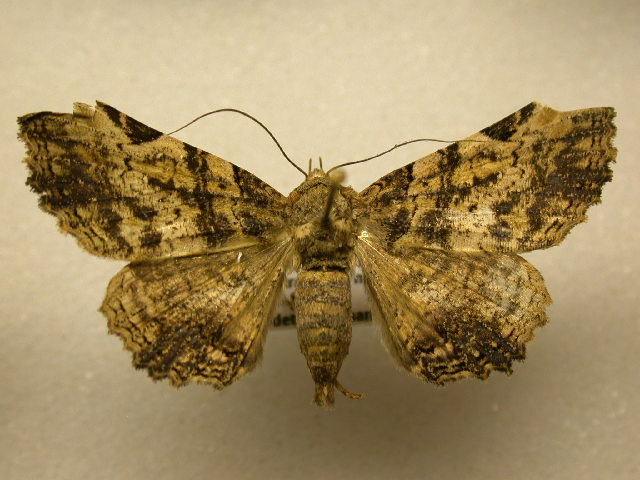

Scientific classification
- Kingdom: Animalia
- Phylum: Arthropoda
- Clade: Pancrustacea
- Class: Insecta
- Order: Lepidoptera
- Superfamily: Noctuoidea
- Family: Erebidae
- Tribe: Omopterini
- Genus: Metria; Hübner, [1823]

Synonyms
- Safia Guenée, 1852; Campometra Guenée, 1852; Yrias Guenée, 1852; Rhubuna Walker, 1858; Placonia Möschler, 1880

= Metria =

Genus of moths

Metria is a genus of moths in the family Erebidae. The genus was erected by Jacob Hübner in 1823.

== Species ==
The following species are recognised in the genus Metria:

- Metria amella Guenée, 1852 – live oak metria moth
- Metria bilineata Smith, 1899
- Metria binea Druce
- Metria cades (Druce, 1898)
- Metria celia Cramer
- Metria endopolia
- Metria euristea Stoll, 1780
- Metria hyalina Prout, 1921
- Metria minor
- Metria pascali Barbut, 2016
- Metria phaeochroa (Hampson, 1913)
- Metria subvaria (Schaus, 1906)
