= Cecharismena anartoides =

Scientific classification
- Kingdom: Animalia
- Phylum: Arthropoda
- Class: Insecta
- Order: Lepidoptera
- Superfamily: Noctuoidea
- Family: Erebidae
- Genus: Cecharismena
- Species: C. anartoides

Binomial name
- Cecharismena anartoides (Walker, 1865)

Species of moth

Cecharismena anartoides is a species of moth in the family Erebidae.

The MONA or Hodges number for Cecharismena anartoides is 8533.
