= Rhododactyla =

Scientific classification
- Domain: Eukaryota
- Kingdom: Animalia
- Phylum: Arthropoda
- Class: Insecta
- Order: Lepidoptera
- Superfamily: Noctuoidea
- Family: Erebidae
- Subfamily: Calpinae
- Genus: Rhododactyla; Warren, 1889

Genus of moths

Rhododactyla is a genus of moths of the family Erebidae. The genus was described by Warren in 1889.

== Species ==
- Rhododactyla elicrina (Felder & Rogenhofer, 1874) Brazil (Amazonas)
- Rhododactyla micra Hampson, 1926 Peru
- Rhododactyla semirosea (Herrich-Schäffer, [1858])
