= Raclia =

Scientific classification
- Kingdom: Animalia
- Phylum: Arthropoda
- Class: Insecta
- Order: Lepidoptera
- Superfamily: Noctuoidea
- Family: Erebidae
- Subfamily: Calpinae
- Genus: Raclia; Walker, 1869
- Species: R. cervina

Binomial name
- Raclia cervina Walker, 1869

Genus of moths

Raclia is a monotypic moth genus of the family Erebidae. Its only species, Raclia cervina, is found in the Democratic Republic of the Congo. Both the genus and species were first described by Francis Walker in 1869.

The Global Lepidoptera Names Index gives this name as a synonym of Scambina Walker, 1865.
