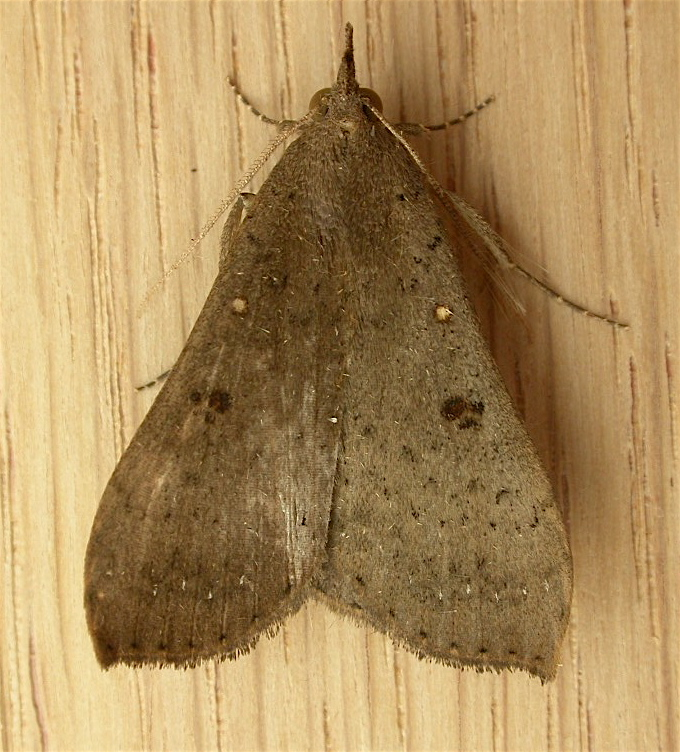
- Rhapsa suscitatalis

Scientific classification
- Kingdom: Animalia
- Phylum: Arthropoda
- Class: Insecta
- Order: Lepidoptera
- Superfamily: Noctuoidea
- Family: Erebidae
- Subfamily: Calpinae
- Genus: Rhapsa; Walker, 1866

= Rhapsa =

Genus of moths

Rhapsa is a genus of moths of the family Noctuidae. The genus was erected by Francis Walker in 1866.

== Species ==
- Rhapsa eretmophora Turner, 1932
- Rhapsa occidentalis Turner, 1944
- Rhapsa scotosialis Walker, 1866
- Rhapsa suscitatalis Walker, 1859
