= Riaga =

Scientific classification
- Domain: Eukaryota
- Kingdom: Animalia
- Phylum: Arthropoda
- Class: Insecta
- Order: Lepidoptera
- Superfamily: Noctuoidea
- Family: Noctuidae (?)
- Subfamily: Catocalinae
- Genus: Riaga; Wileman & West, 1928
- Species: R. radiata

Binomial name
- Riaga radiata Wileman & West, 1928

Genus of moths

Riaga is a genus of moths of the family Noctuidae. Its only species, Riaga radiata, is found in the Philippines. Both the genus and the species were first described by Wileman and West in 1928.
