= Rhesalistis =

Scientific classification
- Kingdom: Animalia
- Phylum: Arthropoda
- Class: Insecta
- Order: Lepidoptera
- Superfamily: Noctuoidea
- Family: Erebidae
- Subfamily: Calpinae
- Genus: Rhesalistis; Hampson, 1926
- Species: R. rotundata

Binomial name
- Rhesalistis rotundata (Rothschild, 1915)

Genus of moths

Rhesalistis is a monotypic moth genus of the family Erebidae erected by George Hampson in 1926. Its only species, Rhesalistis rotundata, was first described by Rothschild in 1915. It is found on New Guinea.
