= Rhopalognatha =

Scientific classification
- Kingdom: Animalia
- Phylum: Arthropoda
- Class: Insecta
- Order: Lepidoptera
- Superfamily: Noctuoidea
- Family: Erebidae
- Subfamily: Calpinae
- Genus: Rhopalognatha; Hampson, 1926

Genus of moths

Rhopalognatha is a genus of moths of the family Erebidae. The genus was erected by George Hampson in 1926.

== Species ==
- Rhopalognatha anterosticta (Dognin, 1914) Colombia
- Rhopalognatha chota (Dognin, 1897) Ecuador
- Rhopalognatha cyanescens (Dognin, 1914) Colombia
- Rhopalognatha molybdota (Dognin, 1914) Colombia
- Rhopalognatha purpureofusca (Dognin, 1914) Colombia
