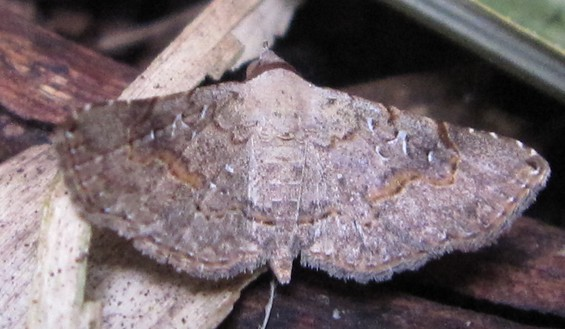

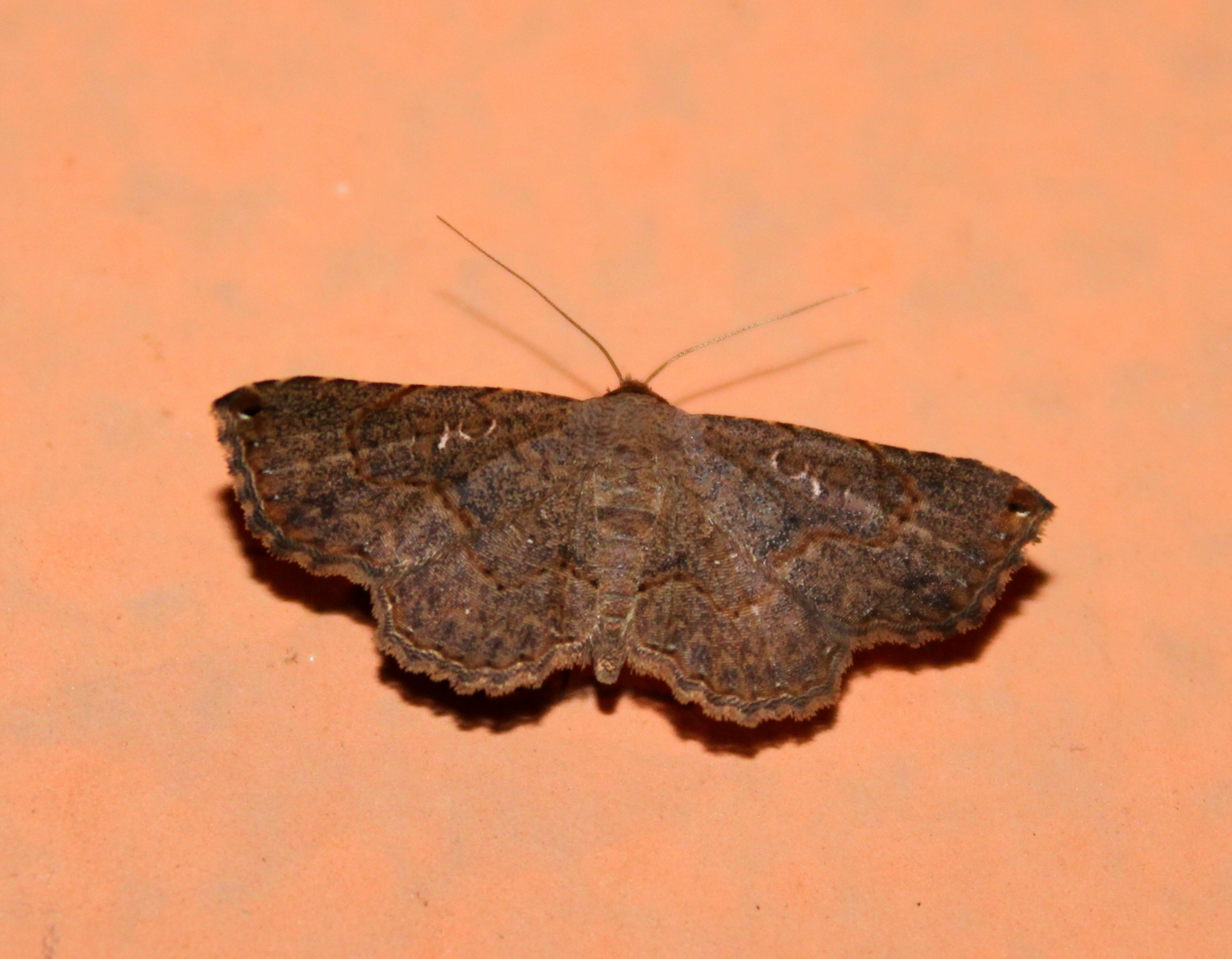

Scientific classification
- Kingdom: Animalia
- Phylum: Arthropoda
- Class: Insecta
- Order: Lepidoptera
- Superfamily: Noctuoidea
- Family: Erebidae
- Subfamily: Calpinae
- Genus: Rhesala; Walker, 1858

Synonyms
- Hingula Moore 1882; Magulaba Walker 1866; Rimulia Saalmuller 1891; Pyralomorpha Rebel, 1917

= Rhesala =

Genus of moths

Rhesala is a genus of moths of the family Erebidae. The genus was erected by Francis Walker in 1858.

== Species ==
- Rhesala albolunata (Moore, 1882) southern India
- Rhesala biagi (Bethune-Baker, 1908) New Guinea
- Rhesala cervina (Moore, 1882) Manipur
- Rhesala cineribasis de Joannis, 1929 Vietnam
- Rhesala costiplaga (Holland, 1900) Buru
- Rhesala falcata Holloway, 2005 Borneo
- Rhesala fusiformis Holloway, 2005 Borneo, Singapore
- Rhesala goleta (Felder & Rogenhofer, 1874) Ghana, Cameroon, Ethiopia, Uganda, Kenya, Tanzania, Malawi, Mozambique, Zimbabwe, South Africa
- Rhesala grisea (Hampson, 1916) Somalia
- Rhesala imparata Walker, 1858 India (Nilgiris, Meghalaya, Manipuri, Kolkata), Sri Lanka, Buru, Celebes, Taiwan, Japan
- Rhesala inconcinnalis (Walker, [1866]) Ceram, Amboina
- Rhesala irregularis Holloway, 1979 New Caledonia, Fiji
- Rhesala moestalis (Walker, [1866]) Sierra Leone, Ivory Coast, Ghana, Nigeria, Gabon, Arabia, Sudan, Somalia, Ethiopia, Kenya, Malawi, Tanzania, Botswana, Mozambique, Zambia, Zimbabwe, Angola, Namibia, South Africa, Comoros, Madagascar, Seychelles, Sri Lanka, Malaysia, New Guinea
- Rhesala nigricans (Snellen, 1880) Borneo, Sulawesi
- Rhesala nigriceps (Hampson, 1895) Simla, Poona, Bombay
- Rhesala nyasica Hampson, 1926
- Rhesala punctisigna Hampson, 1926 Kenya
