= Rungsianea =

Scientific classification
- Domain: Eukaryota
- Kingdom: Animalia
- Phylum: Arthropoda
- Class: Insecta
- Order: Lepidoptera
- Superfamily: Noctuoidea
- Family: Noctuidae
- Tribe: Hadenini
- Genus: Rungsianea; Viette, 1963

Genus of moths

Rungsianea is a genus of moths of the family Noctuidae erected by Pierre Viette in 1963. Both species are known from Madagascar.

== Species ==
- Rungsianea fontainei Viette, 1967
- Rungsianea hecate (Viette, 1960)
