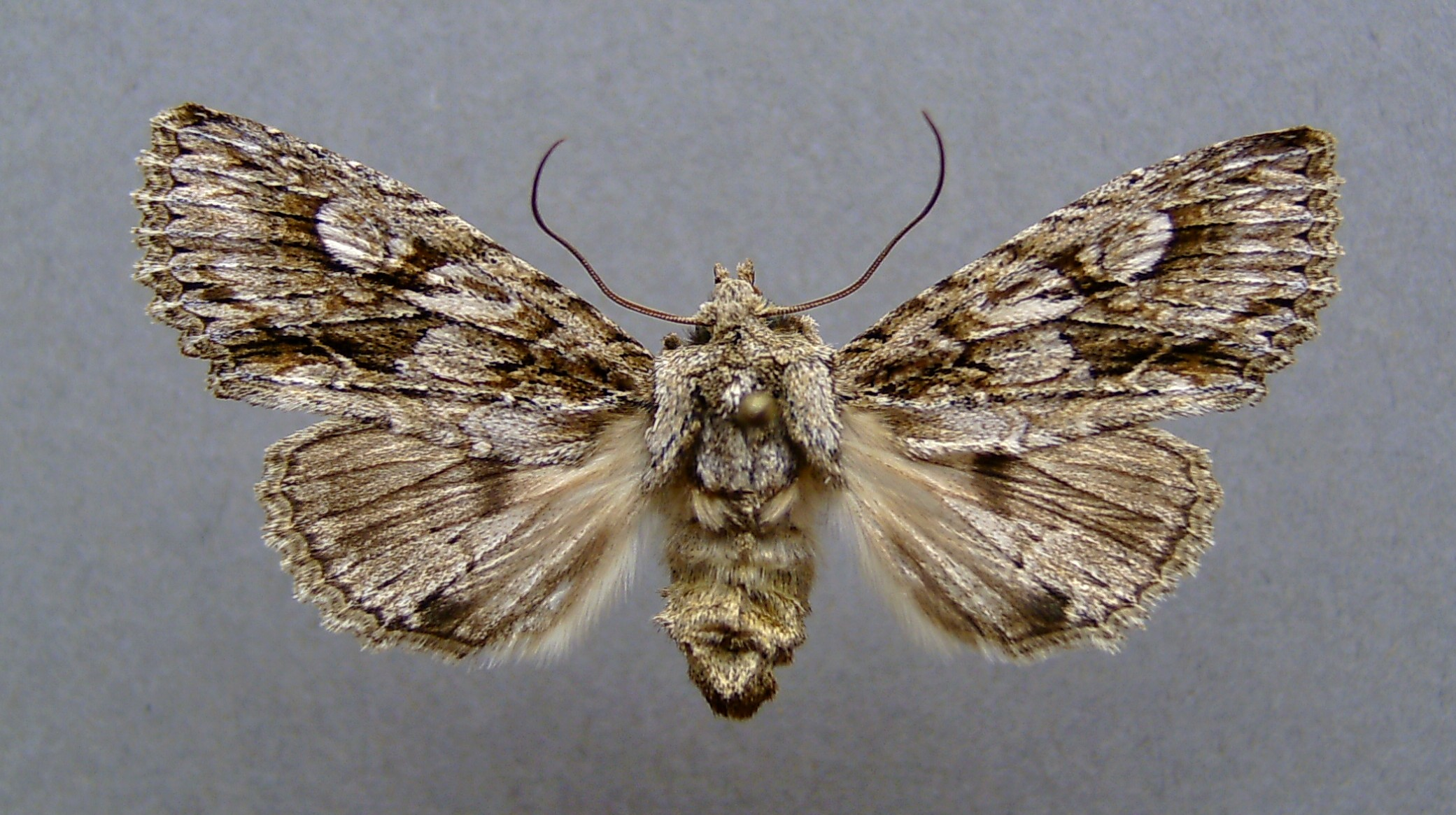

Scientific classification
- Kingdom: Animalia
- Phylum: Arthropoda
- Class: Insecta
- Order: Lepidoptera
- Superfamily: Noctuoidea
- Family: Noctuidae
- Genus: Meganephria
- Species: M. bimaculosa

Binomial name
- Meganephria bimaculosa (Linnaeus, 1767)

Synonyms
- Phalaena bimaculosa Linnaeus, 1767; Miselia bimaculosa

= Meganephria bimaculosa =

Species of moth

Meganephria bimaculosa, the double-spot brocade, is a species of moth of the family Noctuidae. It is found in most of Europe (mainly Southern and Eastern Europe), in Turkey and the west of Iran. In Anatolia it is represented by the subspecies Meganephria bimaculosa pontica.

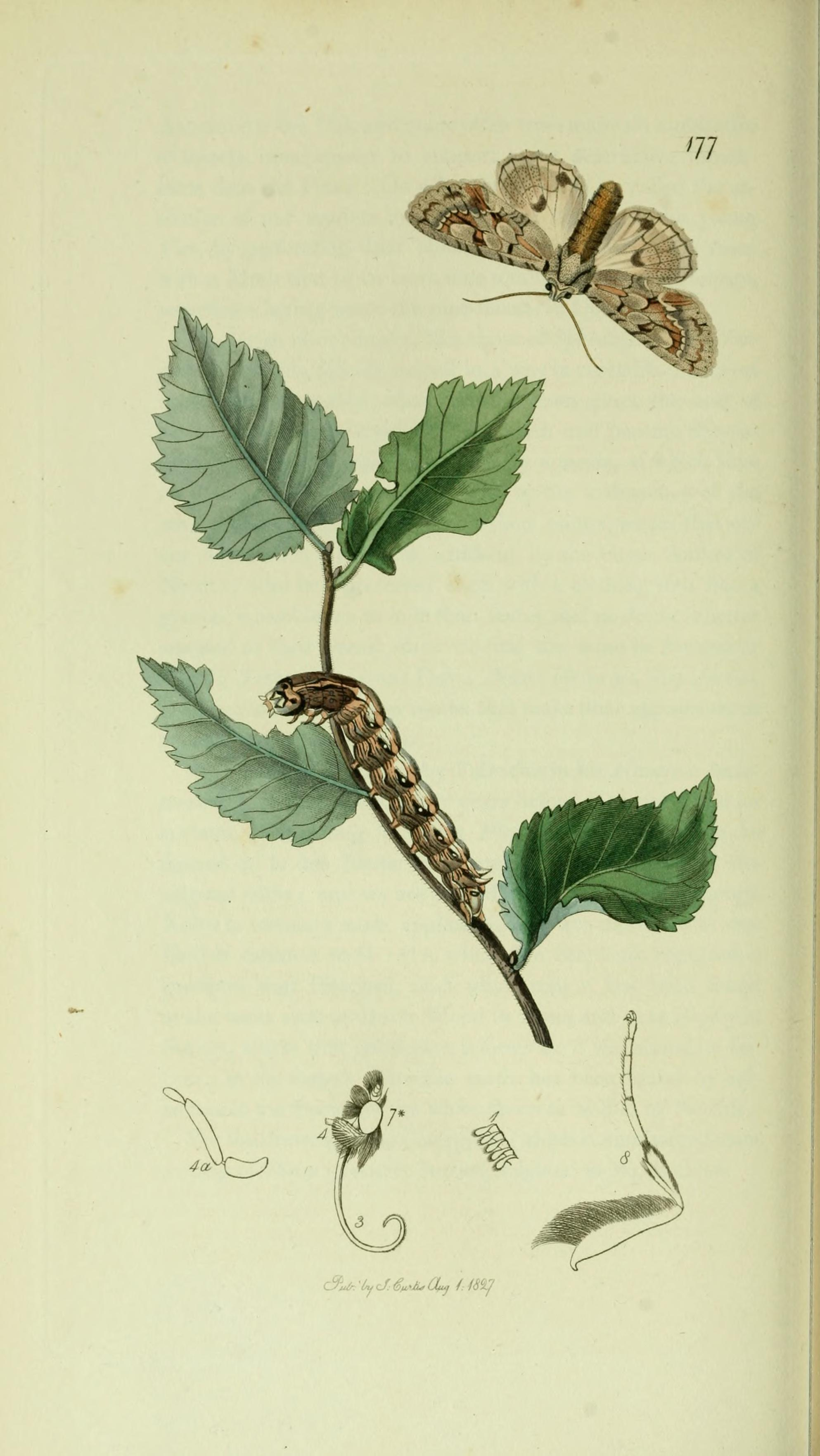
Illustration from John Curtis's British Entomology Volume 5

== Description in Seitz ==
Forewing whitish grey, speckled with darker scales, the shadings olive brownish, this colour filling up the outer half of median area between subcostal vein and submedian fold; a thick dark streak from base below cell; inner line double, oblique and angulated, darker externally; outer line lunulate-dentate, double; stigmata all large, rounded, pale grey with darker dusting, the reniform externally white, with a black line along its base above the median. vein; veins towards termen black-dotted, the intervals on margin with redbrown dentate markings, the submarginal line with a rufous dentate shade before it, crossed by a diffuse dark shade on submedian fold; hindwing pale and darker grey; a large cell blotch and blotch at margin on submedian fold blackish; an obscure darker outer line; marginal area pale grey. Larva brown, darker in front; dorsal line narrow, pale, with 4 white tubercles on each side; lateral lines waved, darkedged above, paler below; 11th segment with a two-pointed hump. The wingspan is 50–58 mm.

== Biology ==
Adults are on wing from August to October.

The larvae feed on Ulmus species.
