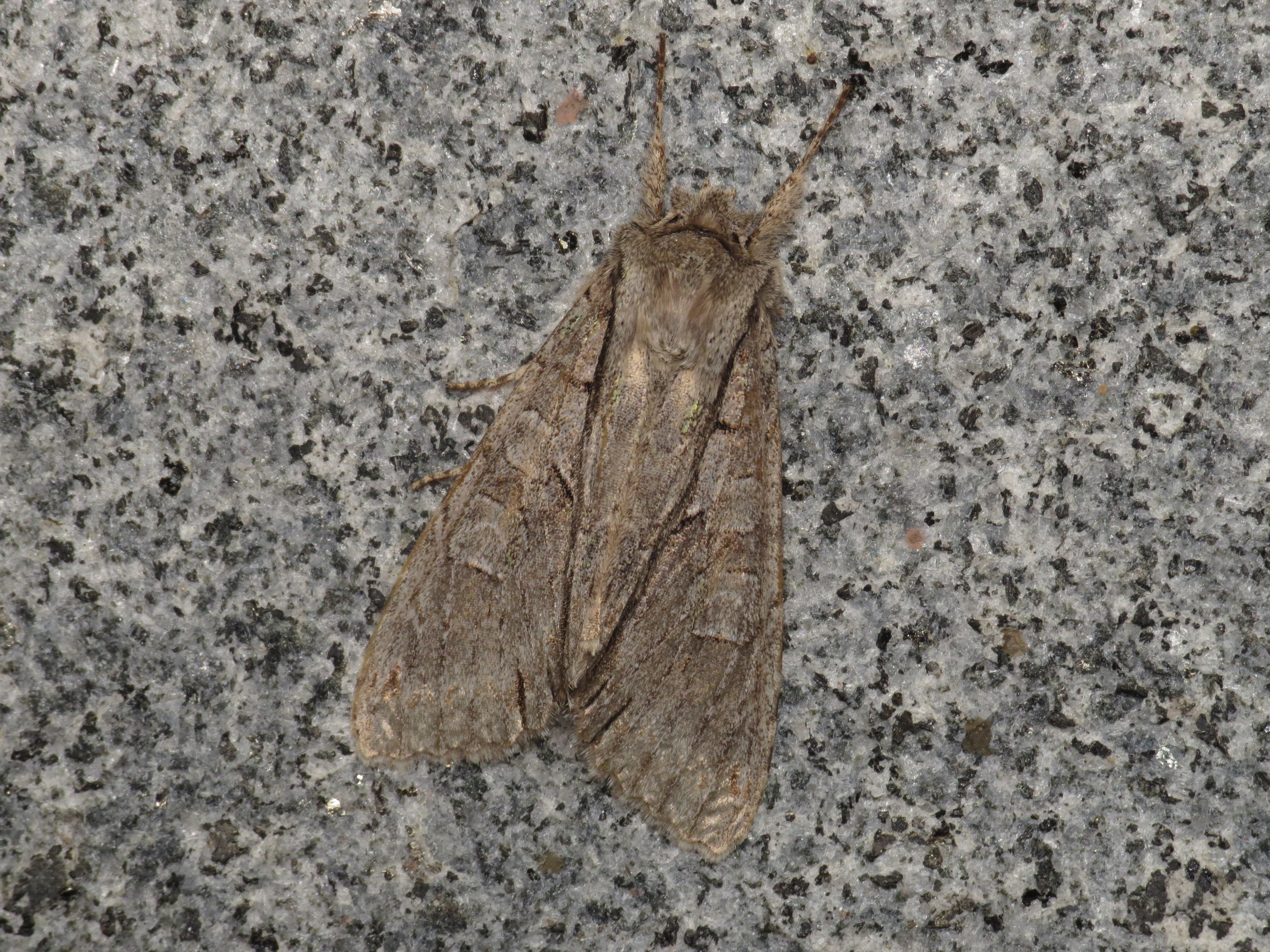
- Meganephria extensa

Scientific classification
- Kingdom: Animalia
- Phylum: Arthropoda
- Clade: Pancrustacea
- Class: Insecta
- Order: Lepidoptera
- Superfamily: Noctuoidea
- Family: Noctuidae
- Subfamily: Cuculliinae
- Genus: Meganephria; Hübner, 1820

= Meganephria =

Genus of moths

Meganephria is a genus of moths of the family Noctuidae.

== Species ==
- Meganephria bimaculosa (Linnaeus, 1767)
- Meganephria cinerea (Butler, 1881)
- Meganephria crassa Kobayashi & Owada, 1996
- Meganephria extensa (Butler, 1879)
- Meganephria funesta (Leech, 1889)
- Meganephria kononenkoi Poole, 1989
- Meganephria laxa Kobayashi & Owada, 1996
- Meganephria parki Kononenko & Ronkay, 1998
- Meganephria retinea Gyulai & Ronkay, 1999
- Meganephria splendida Yoshimoto, 1993
- Meganephria tancrei (Graeser, 1888)
- Meganephria weixleri Hreblay & Ronkay, 1997
