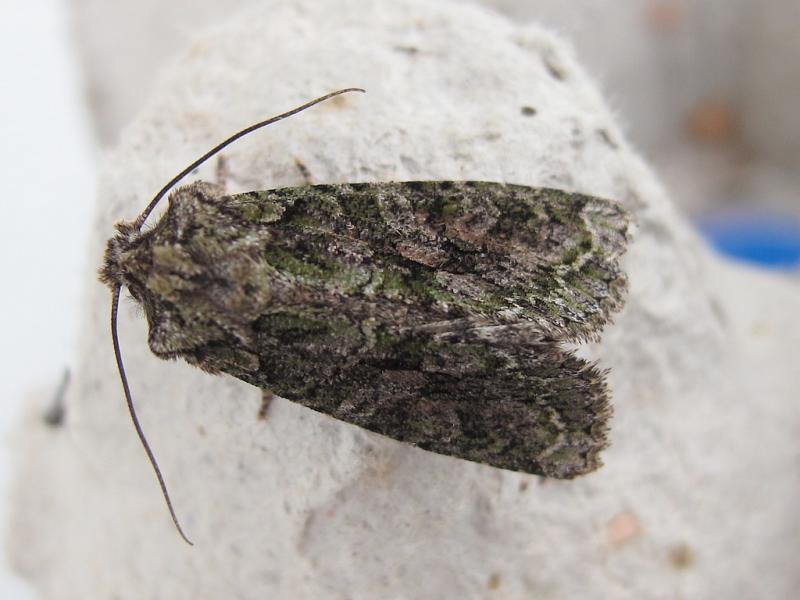

Scientific classification
- Domain: Eukaryota
- Kingdom: Animalia
- Phylum: Arthropoda
- Class: Insecta
- Order: Lepidoptera
- Superfamily: Noctuoidea
- Family: Noctuidae
- Genus: Dryobotodes
- Species: D. eremita

Binomial name
- Dryobotodes eremita (Fabricius, 1775)

Synonyms
- Noctua eremita Fabricius, 1775; Noctua seladonia Fabricius, 1794; Dryobota protea var. corsica Spuler, 1908; Dryobotodes protea f. dejecta Warren, 1910; Dryobotodes protea f. grisea Warren, 1910; Noctua protea Denis & Schiffermüller, 1775

= Dryobotodes eremita =

Species of moth

Dryobotodes eremita, the brindled green, is a moth of the family Noctuidae. The species was first described by Johan Christian Fabricius in 1775. It is found in most of Europe, east to Turkey.

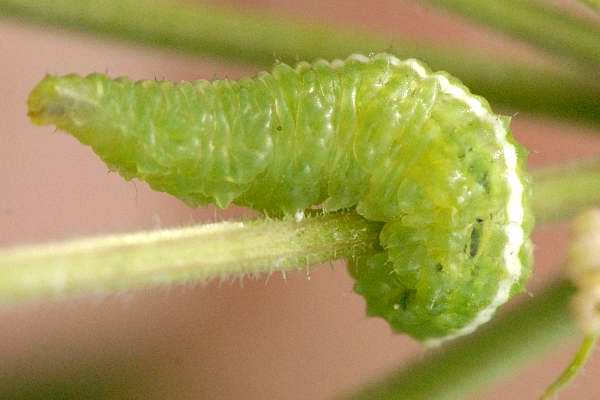
Larva

== Description ==
The wingspan is 32–39 mm. Forewing olive green mixed with light or dark grey, varied in places with pale brown or reddish, the latter tints appearing along the two folds, the whole wing having a mossy appearance; lines blackish, indistinct; a black streak between inner and outer lines, below the claviform which is followed by a rufous patch; upper stigmata slightly paler grey, tinged with green or reddish; submarginal line pale, followed by blackish scaling on each fold; hindwing dull grey, with darker cellspot, outer line, and submarginal diffuse band; - variegata Tutt is much brighter and gayer; the dark shades, especially in the median area, being intensified, and the paler areas, — viz, the stigmata, the inner margin on each side of the median area, and the space between outer and submarginal lines, lightened; the apex also is prominently paler and the terminal area more largely blackened; - corsica Spul., from the island of that name, is a rough brownish-olive-green form; from Amasia comes a form, which may be called grisea nov. [Warren] in which the tints are merely dark and light grey, with only the least touch of green or brown, and a second form, dejecta nov. [Warren] decidedly smaller, and uniformly dark grey with the markings all more or less obscured and the hindwing darker, whereas in grisea the pale areas are conspicuous and the hindwing whitish; ab. incolorata ab. nov. [Warren] has the ground colour pale or dark grey, without coloured tints except a faint rufous flush along the two folds and the course of the submarginal line.

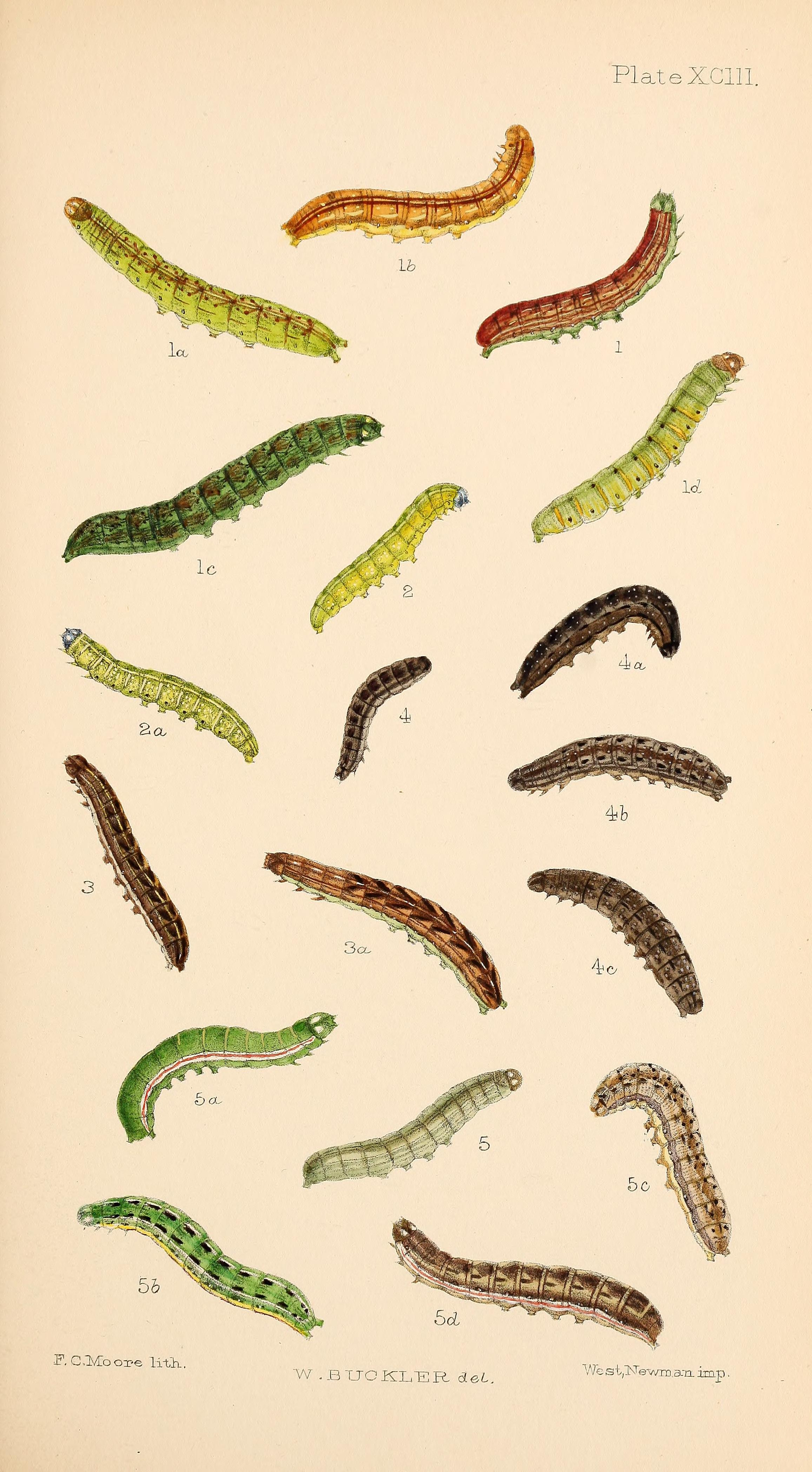
2, 2a larvae after final moult

== Biology ==
Adults are on wing in August and September. There is one generation per year.

The larvae feed on Quercus species, initially on the buds and later on the leaves.
