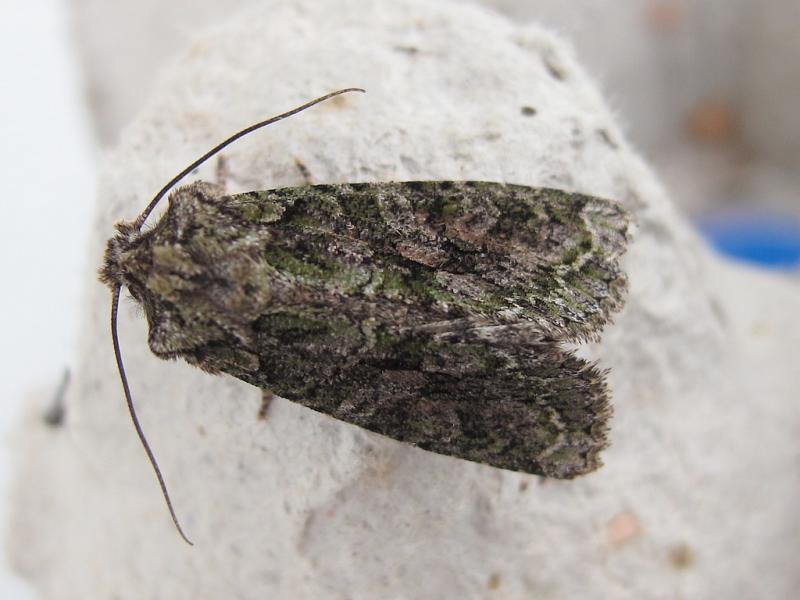
- Dryobotodes eremita

Scientific classification
- Kingdom: Animalia
- Phylum: Arthropoda
- Class: Insecta
- Order: Lepidoptera
- Superfamily: Noctuoidea
- Family: Noctuidae
- Subtribe: Antitypina
- Genus: Dryobotodes; Warren, 1911

= Dryobotodes =

Genus of moths

Dryobotodes is a genus of moths of the family Noctuidae raised by the English entomologist, William Warren in 1911.

== Species ==
- Dryobotodes angusta Sugi, 1980
- Dryobotodes banghaasi Draeseke, 1928
- Dryobotodes carbonis (Wagner, 1931)
- Dryobotodes cerriformis Hreblay & Ronkay, 1998
- Dryobotodes chlorota (Hampson, 1909)
- Dryobotodes contermina (Graeser, 1892)
- Dryobotodes eremita (Fabricius, 1775) – brindled green
- Dryobotodes formosanus Hreblay & Ronkay, 1998
- Dryobotodes glaucus L.Ronkay & Gyulai, 2006
- Dryobotodes hampsoni (Hacker & Peks, 1993)
- Dryobotodes himalayensis Hreblay, Peregovits & Ronkay, 1999
- Dryobotodes intermissa (Butler, 1886)
- Dryobotodes lubrica (Butler, 1889)
- Dryobotodes monochroma (Esper, 1790)
- Dryobotodes obliquisigna (Hampson, 1902)
- Dryobotodes praetermissa (Draudt, 1950)
- Dryobotodes pryeri (Leech, 1900)
- Dryobotodes roboris (Boisduval, [1828]) – southern brindled green
- Dryobotodes servadeii Parenzan, 1981
- Dryobotodes tenebrosa (Esper, 1789) – sombre brocade
