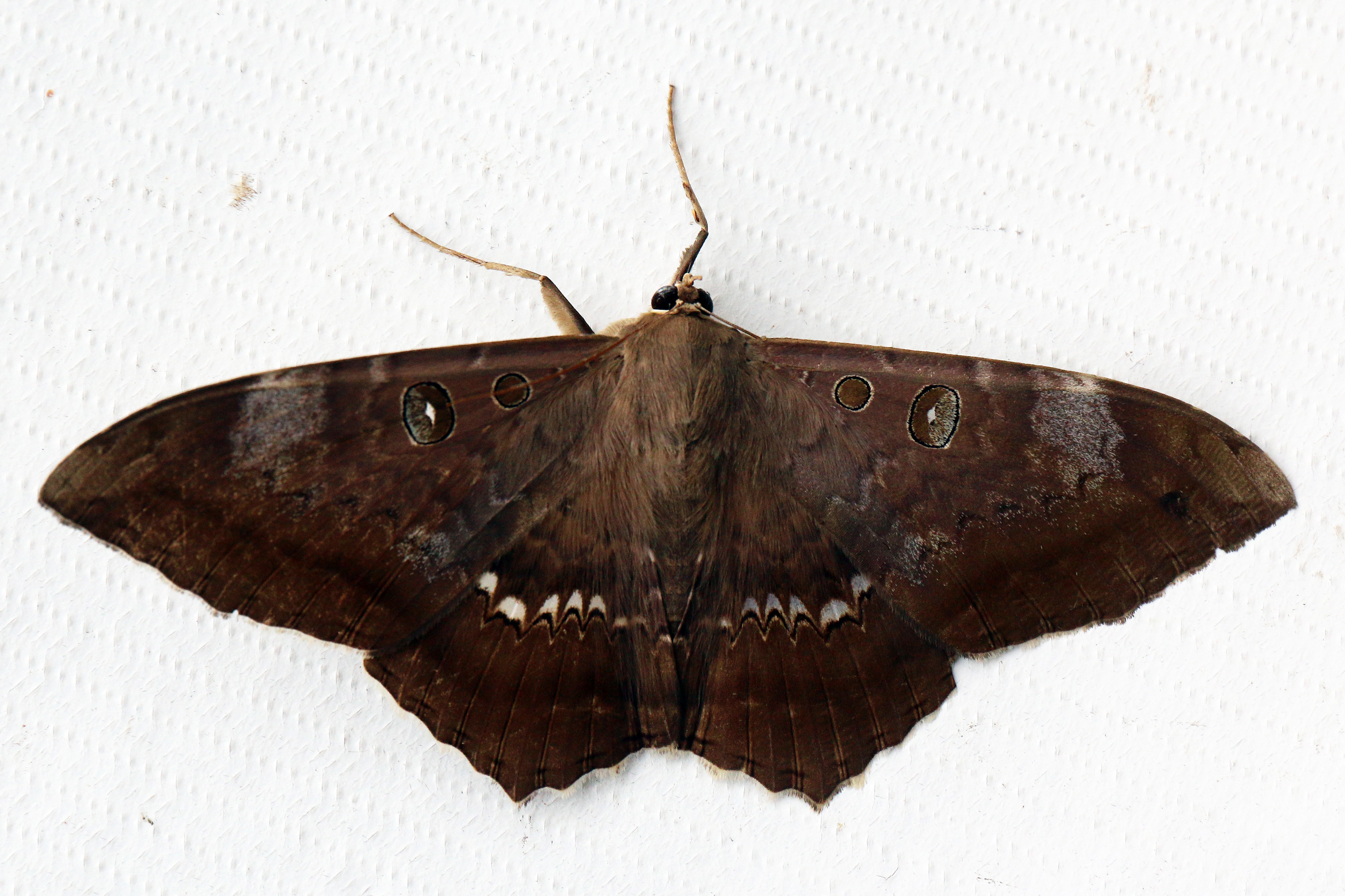
- Cyclopis caecutiens from Brazil

Scientific classification
- Kingdom: Animalia
- Phylum: Arthropoda
- Clade: Pancrustacea
- Class: Insecta
- Order: Lepidoptera
- Superfamily: Noctuoidea
- Family: Erebidae
- Subfamily: Calpinae; Boisduval, 1840

Synonyms
- Ophiderinae

= Calpinae =

Subfamily of moths

The Calpinae are a subfamily of moths in the family Erebidae described by Jean Baptiste Boisduval in 1840. This subfamily includes many species of moths that have a pointed and barbed proboscis adapted to piercing the skins of fruit to feed on juice, and in the case of the several Calyptra species of vampire moths, to piercing the skins of mammals to feed on blood. The subfamily contains some large moths with wingspans longer than 5 cm (2 in).

== Taxonomy ==
Recent phylogenetic studies have greatly revised this subfamily. The subfamily was previously classified within the Noctuidae, but the redefinition of that family has reclassified many of that family's subfamilies, including Calpinae, into the family Erebidae. The Calpinae are most closely related to a clade including the subfamilies Eulepidotinae and Hypocalinae, which are also among the Erebidae. The tribes Anomini and Scoliopterygini, previously included in the Calpinae, were found to be distantly related and were reclassified into a separate subfamily as the Scoliopteryginae.

=== Tribes ===
The Calpinae consist of three monophyletic tribes.

- Calpini
- Ophiderini
- Phyllodini

=== Previous taxonomy ===
The status of the former composition of the Calpinae was somewhat disputed; it was sometimes merged into the Catocalinae. Most of the calpine genera were not further classified. The phylogenetic structure of this group was essentially unresolved, and in many cases it was even doubtful whether the genera were indeed correctly placed in this subfamily.

Tribe Calpini

- Africalpe Krüger, 1939
- Calyptra Ochsenheimer, 1816
- Eudocima Billberg, 1820
- Ferenta Walker, 1858
- Gonodonta Hübner, 1818
- Graphigona Walker, 1858
- Oraesia Boisduval & Guenée, 1852
- Plusiodonta Boisduval & Guenée, 1852
- Tetrisia Walker, 1867

Tribe Gonopterini

- Scoliopteryx

Genera incertae sedis

- Cecharismena Möschler, 1890
- Culasta Moore, 1881
- Euryschema Turner, 1925
- Epicyrtica Turner, 1908
- Goniapteryx Perty, 1833
- Hemiceratoides Strand, 1911
- Pharga Walker, 1863
- Phyprosopus Grote, 1872
- Psammathodoxa Dyar, 1921
- Radara Walker, 1862

Genera provisionally placed here (incomplete list); includes taxa sometimes separated in Ophiderinae

- Abriesa
- Acanthoprora
- Agamana
- Alabama
- Amphigonia
- Anachrostis
- Anoba
- Anomis
- Antiblemma
- Anticarsia
- Arcte
- Armana
- Arthisma
- Arugisa
- Ascalapha
- Avitta
- Azeta
- Baniana
- Belciana
- Bematha
- Bendisodes (Catocalinae: Ophiusina?)
- Boryzops
- Brachycyttara
- Brachyona
- Brana
- Brevipecten
- Brontypena
- Bulia
- Calymniops
- Cephena
- Chilkasa
- Chodda
- Cissusa
- Cola
- Concana
- Condate
- Conosema
- Corcobara
- Coxina (Catocalinae: Ophiusina?)
- Crithote
- Crypsiprora
- Cultripalpa
- Cyclodes
- Cyclopis
- Daddala
- Dahlia
- Daona
- Diascia
- Diatenes
- Diphthera
- Dunira
- Dyops
- Eclipsea
- Egnasia
- Egnasides
- Egone
- Ephyrodes
- Epidromia
- Episparis
- Episparina
- Episparonia
- Epitausa
- Eporectis
- Erebus (Catocalinae?)
- Ericeia
- Eubryopterella
- Eudesmeola
- Eulepidotis
- Eurythmus
- Facidina
- Falana
- Fodina
- Forsebia
- Gabara
- Gloriana
- Goniocarsia
- Gracillina
- Helia (Catocalinae: Ophiusina?)
- Hemipsectra
- Heteranassa (Catocalinae: Ophiusina?)
- Hemeroblemma
- Heterormista
- Heterospila
- Hirsutopalpis
- Hopetounia
- Hulodes
- Hypocala
- Hyperlopha
- Hypoprora
- Hyposemansis
- Hypospila
- Hypsoropha
- Ianius
- Isogona
- Itomia (Catocalinae: Ophiusina?)
- Kakopoda (Catocalinae: Ophiusina?)
- Latebraria
- Ledaea
- Leptotroga
- Lesmone (Catocalinae: Ophiusina?)
- Lignicida
- Lineopalpa
- Litocala
- Litoprosopus
- Lophozancla
- Lyncestoides Hacker & Saldaitis, 2010
- Maguda
- Malatrogia
- Manbuta
- Marapana
- Masca
- Massala
- Matella
- Mecodina
- Melipotis (Catocalinae: Ophiusina?)
- Meranda
- Mesosciera
- Metalectra
- Metallata
- Metaphoenia
- Mimophisma (Catocalinae: Ophiusina?)
- Mithila
- Neogabara
- Neostichtis
- Obrima
- Oglasa
- Olulis
- Olyssa
- Ophyx
- Orodesma
- Orthozancla
- Ortopla
- Ossonoba
- Oxygonitis
- Oxyodes
- Palpidia
- Pangrapta
- Panopoda
- Panula
- Parachabora
- Parapadna
- Parolulis
- Perciana
- Perinaenia
- Pilipectus
- Phyllodes
- Phytometra
- Pleurona
- Polydesma (Catocalinae: Ophiusina?)
- Polydesmiola
- Praxis
- Prolyncestis
- Propatria
- Prorocopis
- Pseudorgyia
- Pseudogyrtona
- Ramadasa
- Raparna
- Rema
- Rhapsa
- Rhesala
- Rhesalides
- Rhosologia
- Rhynchodina
- Saroba
- Savara
- Schistorhynx
- Selenisa (Catocalinae: Ophiusina?)
- Selenoperas
- Spectrophysa
- Sphingomorpha
- Stenocarsia
- Stenoprora
- Sundwarda
- Syllectra
- Synalissa
- Sypna
- Sypnoides
- Talmala
- Tamba
- Thiacidas
- Thoracolophotos
- Throana
- Thyrostipa
- Thysania
- Tinolius
- Tipasa
- Tiruvaca
- Tolpia
- Tolpiodes
- Toxonprucha (Catocalinae: Ophiusina?)
- Trigonochrostia
- Trisula
- Tropidtamba
- Tyrissa (Catocalinae: Ophiusina?)
- Ugia
- Veia
- Vestura
- Xanthanomis
- Zaleops (Catocalinae: Ophiusina?)
