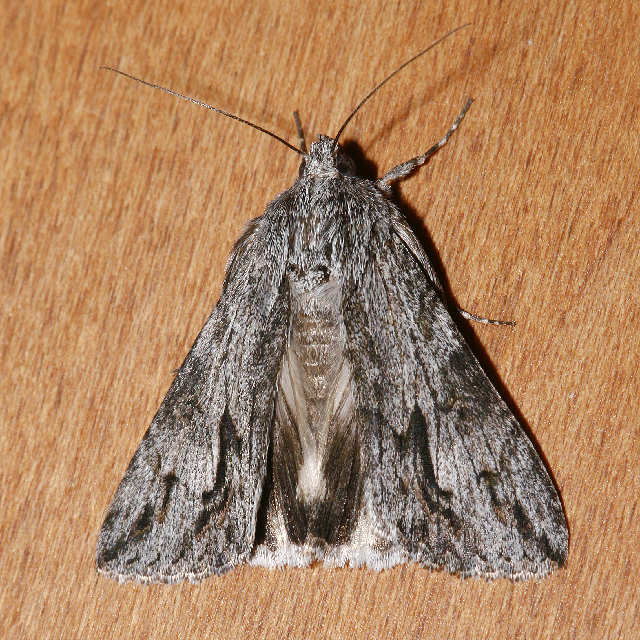
- Melipotis jucunda

Scientific classification
- Kingdom: Animalia
- Phylum: Arthropoda
- Class: Insecta
- Order: Lepidoptera
- Superfamily: Noctuoidea
- Family: Erebidae
- Subfamily: Erebinae
- Tribe: Melipotini; Grote, 1895

= Melipotini =

Tribe of moths

The Melipotini are a tribe of moths in the family Erebidae.

== Genera ==
- Boryzops
- Bulia
- Cissusa
- Drasteria
- Forsebia
- Ianius
- Litocala
- Melipotis
- Orodesma
- Panula
- Phoberia
