= Diascia =

Diascia may refer to:

- Diascia (moth), a genus of moths
- Diascia (plant), a genus of plants
