= Synalissa =

Synalissa may refer to:

- Synalissa (lichen), a genus of lichens in the family Lichinaceae
- Synalissa (moth), a genus of moths in the family Erebidae
