= Abriesa =

Scientific classification
- Domain: Eukaryota
- Kingdom: Animalia
- Phylum: Arthropoda
- Class: Insecta
- Order: Lepidoptera
- Superfamily: Noctuoidea
- Family: Erebidae
- Subfamily: Calpinae
- Genus: Abriesa; C. Swinhoe, 1900
- Species: A. derna

Binomial name
- Abriesa derna C. Swinhoe, 1900

Genus of moths

Abriesa is a monotypic moth genus of the family Erebidae. Its only species, Abriesa derna, is found in Queensland, Australia. Both the genus and the species were first described by Charles Swinhoe in 1900.
