= Brontypena =

Scientific classification
- Domain: Eukaryota
- Kingdom: Animalia
- Phylum: Arthropoda
- Class: Insecta
- Order: Lepidoptera
- Superfamily: Noctuoidea
- Family: Erebidae
- Subfamily: Calpinae
- Genus: Brontypena; Holland, 1900

Genus of moths

Brontypena is a genus of moths of the family Noctuidae.

== Species ==
- Brontypena exima (Pagenstecher, 1886)
- Brontypena lutea (Bethune-Baker, 1908)
- Brontypena pellocrossa Prout, 1932
