= Euryschema =

Scientific classification
- Domain: Eukaryota
- Kingdom: Animalia
- Phylum: Arthropoda
- Class: Insecta
- Order: Lepidoptera
- Superfamily: Noctuoidea
- Family: Erebidae
- Subfamily: Calpinae
- Genus: Euryschema; Turner, 1925
- Species: E. tricycla

Binomial name
- Euryschema tricycla Turner, 1925

Genus of moths

Euryschema is a monotypic moth genus of the family Erebidae. Its only species, Euryschema tricycla, is known from Queensland, Australia. Both the genus and species were first described by Turner in 1925.
