= Parachabora =

Scientific classification
- Domain: Eukaryota
- Kingdom: Animalia
- Phylum: Arthropoda
- Class: Insecta
- Order: Lepidoptera
- Superfamily: Noctuoidea
- Family: Erebidae
- Subfamily: Calpinae
- Genus: Parachabora; Warren, 1889

Genus of moths

Parachabora is a genus of moths of the family Erebidae. The genus was described by Warren in 1889.

== Species ==
- Parachabora abydas Herrich-Schäffer, [1869]
- Parachabora pseudanaetia Dyar, 1918
- Parachabora triangulifera Hampson, 1901
- Parachabora umbrescens Dyar, 1927
