= Gracillina =

Scientific classification
- Kingdom: Animalia
- Phylum: Arthropoda
- Class: Insecta
- Order: Lepidoptera
- Superfamily: Noctuoidea
- Family: Erebidae
- Subfamily: Calpinae
- Genus: Gracillina; Hampson, 1924
- Species: G. prosthenia

Binomial name
- Gracillina prosthenia Hampson, 1924

Genus of moths

Gracillina is a monotypic moth genus of the family Erebidae. Its only species, Gracillina prosthenia, is found in Singapore. Both the genus and the species were first described by George Hampson in 1924.
