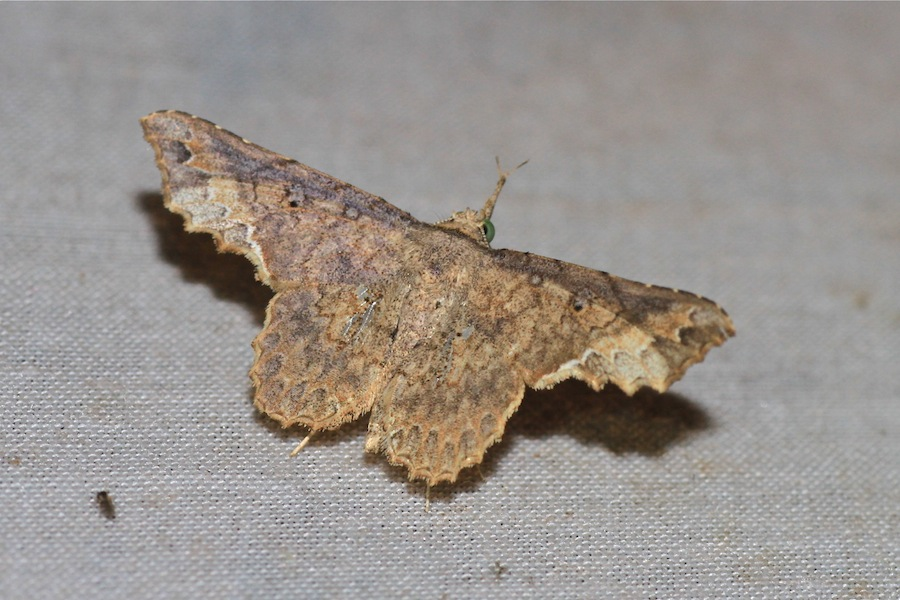
- Throana lasiocera in the Trusmadi area of Borneo in lower montane dipterocarp forest.

Scientific classification
- Kingdom: Animalia
- Phylum: Arthropoda
- Class: Insecta
- Order: Lepidoptera
- Superfamily: Noctuoidea
- Family: Erebidae
- Subfamily: Calpinae
- Genus: Throana; Walker, [1859]

Type species
- Throana amyntoralis Walker, 1858

= Throana =

Genus of moths

Throana is a genus of moths of the family Erebidae erected by Francis Walker in 1859. It consists of very small, slender species found mainly in Sundaland, with at least three species in Sulawesi, and outlying species in Seram and Australia.

== Species ==
- Throana amyntoralis Walker, 1858
- Throana blechrodes Turner, 1903
- Throana callista Prout, 1926
- Throana flavizonata Hampson, 1926
- Throana ionodes Hampson, 1926
- Throana klossi Prout, 1932
- Throana lasiocera Hampson, 1926
- Throana pectinifer Hampson, 1897
- Throana rufipicta Hampson, 1926
