= Sundwarda =

Scientific classification
- Domain: Eukaryota
- Kingdom: Animalia
- Phylum: Arthropoda
- Class: Insecta
- Order: Lepidoptera
- Superfamily: Noctuoidea
- Family: Erebidae
- Subfamily: Calpinae
- Genus: Sundwarda; C. Swinhoe, 1901
- Species: S. dohertyi

Binomial name
- Sundwarda dohertyi (H. Druce, 1901)

Synonyms
- Cerura dohertyi Druce, 1901

Genus of moths

Sundwarda is a monotypic moth genus of the family Erebidae erected by Charles Swinhoe in 1901. Its only species, Sundwarda dohertyi, was first described by Herbert Druce in 1901. It is found in Malaysia.
