= Acanthoprora =

Scientific classification
- Kingdom: Animalia
- Phylum: Arthropoda
- Class: Insecta
- Order: Lepidoptera
- Superfamily: Noctuoidea
- Family: Erebidae
- Subfamily: Calpinae
- Genus: Acanthoprora; Hampson, 1926

Genus of moths

Acanthoprora is a genus of moths of the family Noctuidae.

== Species ==
- Acanthoprora melanoleuca Hampson, 1926
- Acanthoprora streblomita Turner, 1929
