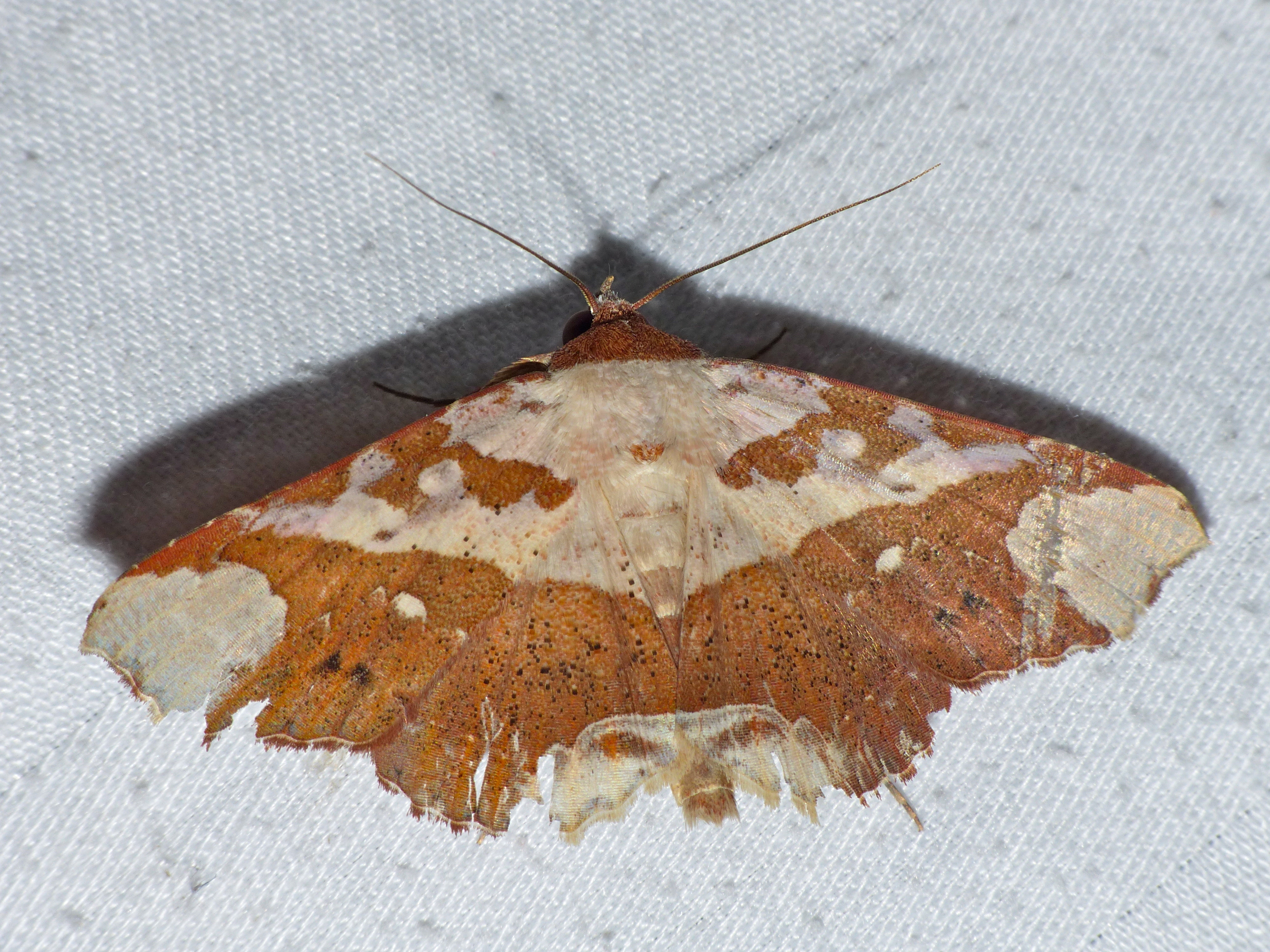
- Tropidtamba lepraota

Scientific classification
- Kingdom: Animalia
- Phylum: Arthropoda
- Class: Insecta
- Order: Lepidoptera
- Superfamily: Noctuoidea
- Family: Erebidae
- Subfamily: Calpinae
- Genus: Tropidtamba; Hampson, 1926

= Tropidtamba =

Genus of moths

Tropidtamba is a genus of moths of the family Erebidae. The genus was erected by George Hampson in 1926.

== Species ==
- Tropidtamba grisea (Holland, 1900) Buru, Malaysia
- Tropidtamba lepraota (Hampson, 1898) Assam, Khasis, Singapore, Queensland
