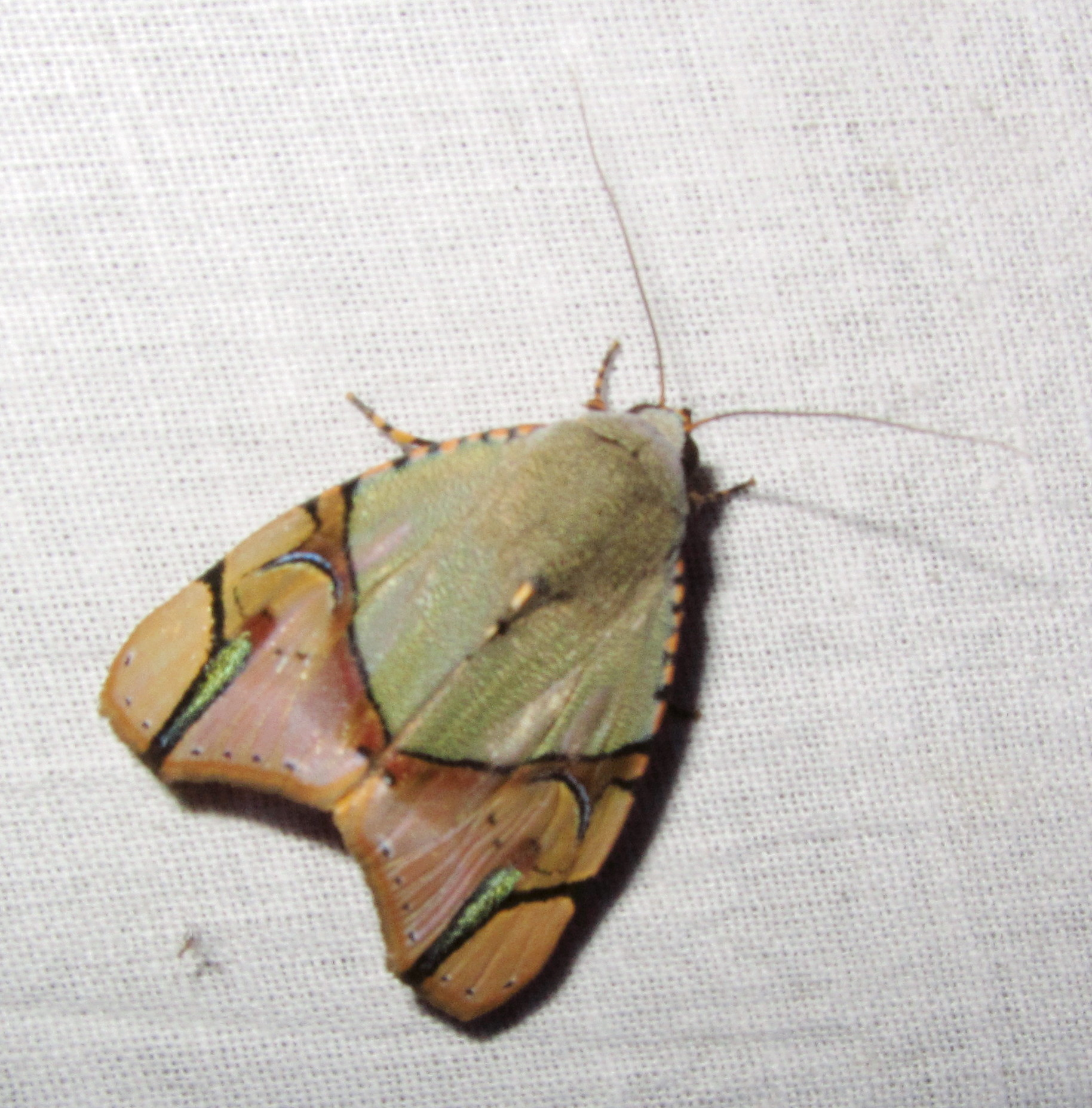

Scientific classification
- Kingdom: Animalia
- Phylum: Arthropoda
- Clade: Pancrustacea
- Class: Insecta
- Order: Lepidoptera
- Superfamily: Noctuoidea
- Family: Erebidae
- Genus: Ramadasa
- Species: R. pavo

Binomial name
- Ramadasa pavo (Walker, 1856)

Synonyms
- Chasmina pavo Walker, 1856

= Ramadasa pavo =

Species of moth

Ramadasa pavo is a moth of the family Noctuidae first described by Francis Walker in 1856. It is found in south-east Asia. Including Sumatra, Borneo, Sabah, Sulawesi, Thailand, Sri Lanka, India and China.

== Description ==
The wingspan is 45 mm in male and 50 mm in female. Forewing of male with veins 3, 4, and 5 curved at their bases. The membrane in the cell and interno-median interspace slightly ridged, probably for stridulation. Head and thorax clothed with grey brown mottled scaled. The frons barred with orange and metallic blue black. Abdomen orange. Forewings with greyish basal area, mottled with brown. Costa orange, with five blue-black spots. There is an oblique medial black line with vinous suffusion on its outer edge. The outer area pale chestnut. The reniform large and incomplete, outlined on its upper and inner sides by black and violet, the upper part of its outer edge by a black line, terminating in a red speck with two black specks below it. A black striga runs from the costa to the reniform, and a blue-black band beyond it from the costa to vein 6, where it is bent outwards to the margin as a streak. There is a black and white sub-marginal specks series. Hindwings are orange.
