= Pleurona =

Scientific classification
- Kingdom: Animalia
- Phylum: Arthropoda
- Class: Insecta
- Order: Lepidoptera
- Superfamily: Noctuoidea
- Family: Erebidae
- Subfamily: Calpinae
- Genus: Pleurona; Walker, 1866

Genus of moths

Pleurona is a genus of moths of the family Erebidae. The genus was erected by Francis Walker in 1866.

== Species ==
- Pleurona ochrolutea Hulstaert, 1924
- Pleurona rudis Walker
- Pleurona sirenia Viette, 1956
- Pleurona falcata Walker, 1866
