= Vestura =

Scientific classification
- Domain: Eukaryota
- Kingdom: Animalia
- Phylum: Arthropoda
- Class: Insecta
- Order: Lepidoptera
- Superfamily: Noctuoidea
- Family: Erebidae
- Subfamily: Calpinae
- Genus: Vestura; C. Swinhoe, 1904
- Species: V. minereusalis

Binomial name
- Vestura minereusalis (Walker, [1859])

Synonyms
- Egnasia minereusalis Walker, [1859]; Zethes albonotata Snellen, 1886

Genus of moths

Vestura is a monotypic moth genus of the family Erebidae erected by Charles Swinhoe in 1904. Its only species, Vestura minereusalis, was first described by Francis Walker in 1859. It is found in Borneo, Sumatra and Singapore.
