= Hypoprora =

Scientific classification
- Kingdom: Animalia
- Phylum: Arthropoda
- Class: Insecta
- Order: Lepidoptera
- Superfamily: Noctuoidea
- Family: Erebidae
- Subfamily: Calpinae
- Genus: Hypoprora; Hampson, 1926

Genus of moths

Hypoprora is a genus of moths of the family Erebidae. The genus was erected by George Hampson in 1926.

== Species ==
- Hypoprora lophosoma (Turner, 1906) Queensland
- Hypoprora tortuosa Turner, 1929 Queensland
- Hypoprora tyra (C. Swinhoe, 1902) Western Australia
