= Veia =

Scientific classification
- Kingdom: Animalia
- Phylum: Arthropoda
- Class: Insecta
- Order: Lepidoptera
- Superfamily: Noctuoidea
- Family: Erebidae
- Subfamily: Calpinae
- Genus: Veia; Walker, [1863]

Synonyms
- Naharra Walker, 1865

Genus of moths

Veia is a genus of moths of the family Noctuidae. The genus was erected by Francis Walker in 1863.

== Species ==
- Veia caeruleotincta (Rothschild, 1915) New Guinea
- Veia contracta (Walker, 1865) Aru
- Veia homopteroides Walker, [1863] Borneo
- Veia microsticta (Turner, 1908) Queensland
- Veia pectinata Holloway, 1979 New Caledonia
