= Schistorhynx =

Scientific classification
- Kingdom: Animalia
- Phylum: Arthropoda
- Class: Insecta
- Order: Lepidoptera
- Superfamily: Noctuoidea
- Family: Erebidae
- Subfamily: Calpinae
- Genus: Schistorhynx; Hampson, 1898

Genus of moths

Schistorhynx is a genus of moths of the family Erebidae. The genus was erected by George Hampson in 1898.

== Species ==
- Schistorhynx argentistriga Hampson, 1898 Assam, Khasis
- Schistorhynx lobata A. E. Prout, 1925 Borneo
- Schistorhynx unistriga Roepke, 1938 northern Sulawesi
