= Eporectis =

Scientific classification
- Kingdom: Animalia
- Phylum: Arthropoda
- Class: Insecta
- Order: Lepidoptera
- Superfamily: Noctuoidea
- Family: Erebidae
- Subfamily: Calpinae
- Genus: Eporectis; Meyrick, 1902

Synonyms
- Proscrana Turner, 1902

Genus of moths

Eporectis is a genus of moths of the family Erebidae. The genus was erected by Edward Meyrick in 1902. Both species are found in the Australian state of Queensland.

== Species ==
- Eporectis phenax Meyrick, 1902
- Eporectis tephropis Turner, 1902
