= Oxygonitis =

Scientific classification
- Kingdom: Animalia
- Phylum: Arthropoda
- Clade: Pancrustacea
- Class: Insecta
- Order: Lepidoptera
- Superfamily: Noctuoidea
- Family: Erebidae
- Subfamily: Calpinae
- Genus: Oxygonitis; Hampson, 1893
- Species: O. sericeata

Binomial name
- Oxygonitis sericeata Hampson, 1893

Genus of moths

Oxygonitis is a monotypic moth genus of the family Noctuidae. Its single species, Oxygonitis sericeata, is found in the Indian subregion, Myanmar, Sumatra, Peninsular Malaysia, Java, Borneo, the Philippines, Sulawesi, Australia and Sri Lanka. Both the genus and species were first described by George Hampson in 1893.

== Description ==
Palpi upturned, where the second joint reaching vertex of head, and third joint minute. Antennae minutely fasciculated in male. Thorax and abdomen smoothly scaled. Forewings produced with acute apex. The outer margin excised at vein 4, where it is produced to a hook. Hindwings with truncate anal angle, and veins 3 and 4 arise from cell in male, which slightly stalked in female. Vein 5 arises from below the centre of the discocellulars.

Its wingspan is about 4 cm.
