= Mesosciera =

Scientific classification
- Kingdom: Animalia
- Phylum: Arthropoda
- Class: Insecta
- Order: Lepidoptera
- Superfamily: Noctuoidea
- Family: Erebidae
- Subfamily: Calpinae
- Genus: Mesosciera; Hampson, 1926

Genus of moths

Mesosciera is a genus of moths of the family Erebidae. The genus was erected by George Hampson in 1926.

== Species ==
- Mesosciera orientalis Hampson, 1926 Singapore
- Mesosciera picta Hampson, 1926 southern Nigeria
- Mesosciera rubrinotata Hampson, 1926 southern Nigeria
- Mesosciera typica (Hampson, 1926) Ghana
