= Parachabora triangulifera =

Scientific classification
- Kingdom: Animalia
- Phylum: Arthropoda
- Class: Insecta
- Order: Lepidoptera
- Superfamily: Noctuoidea
- Family: Erebidae
- Genus: Parachabora
- Species: P. triangulifera

Binomial name
- Parachabora triangulifera Hampson, 1901

Synonyms
- Parachabora purpurascens Herrich-Schäffer, 1868

Species of moth

Parachabora triangulifera is a moth of the family Noctuidae first described by George Hampson in 1901. It is found on Cuba.
