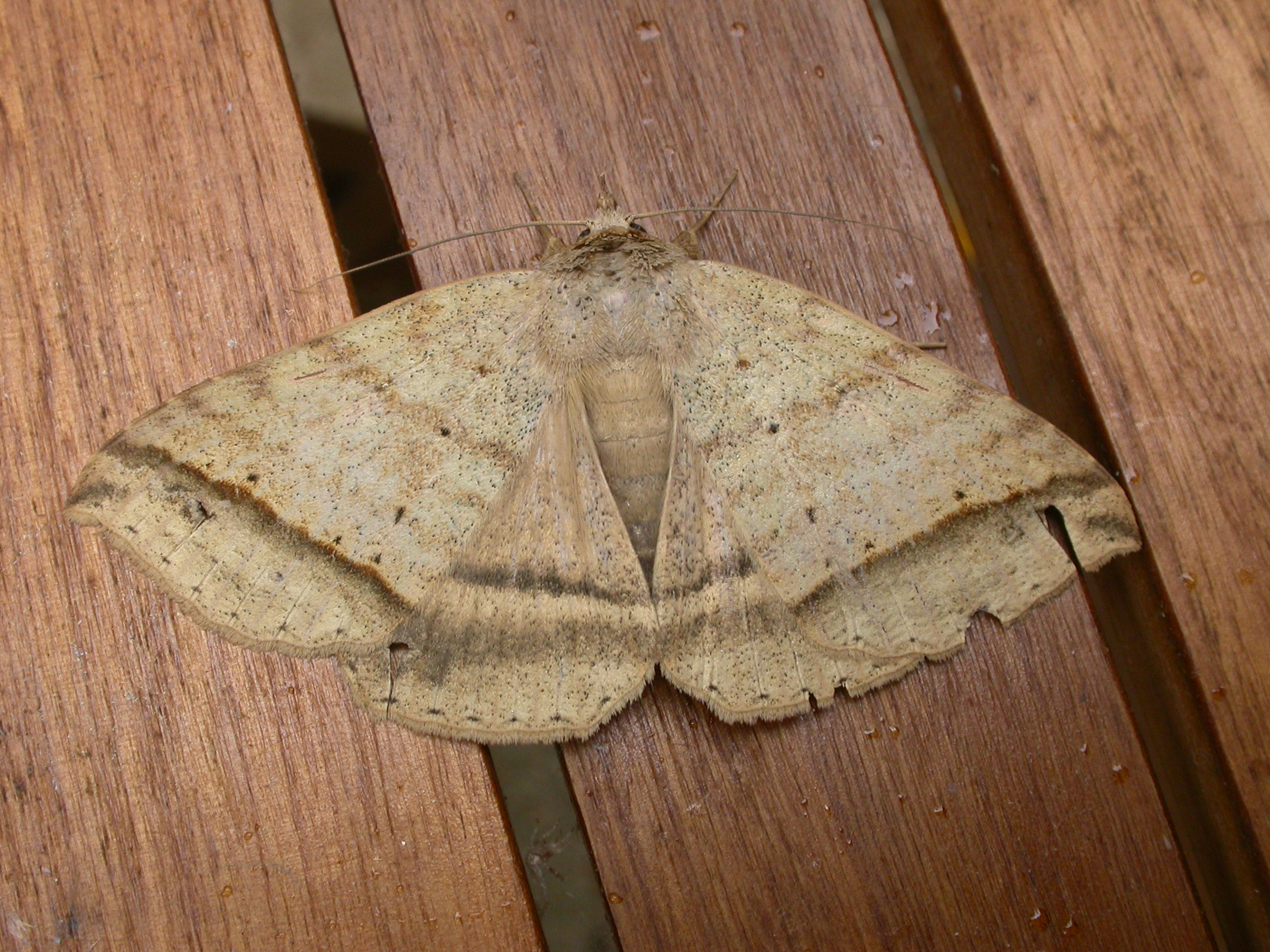

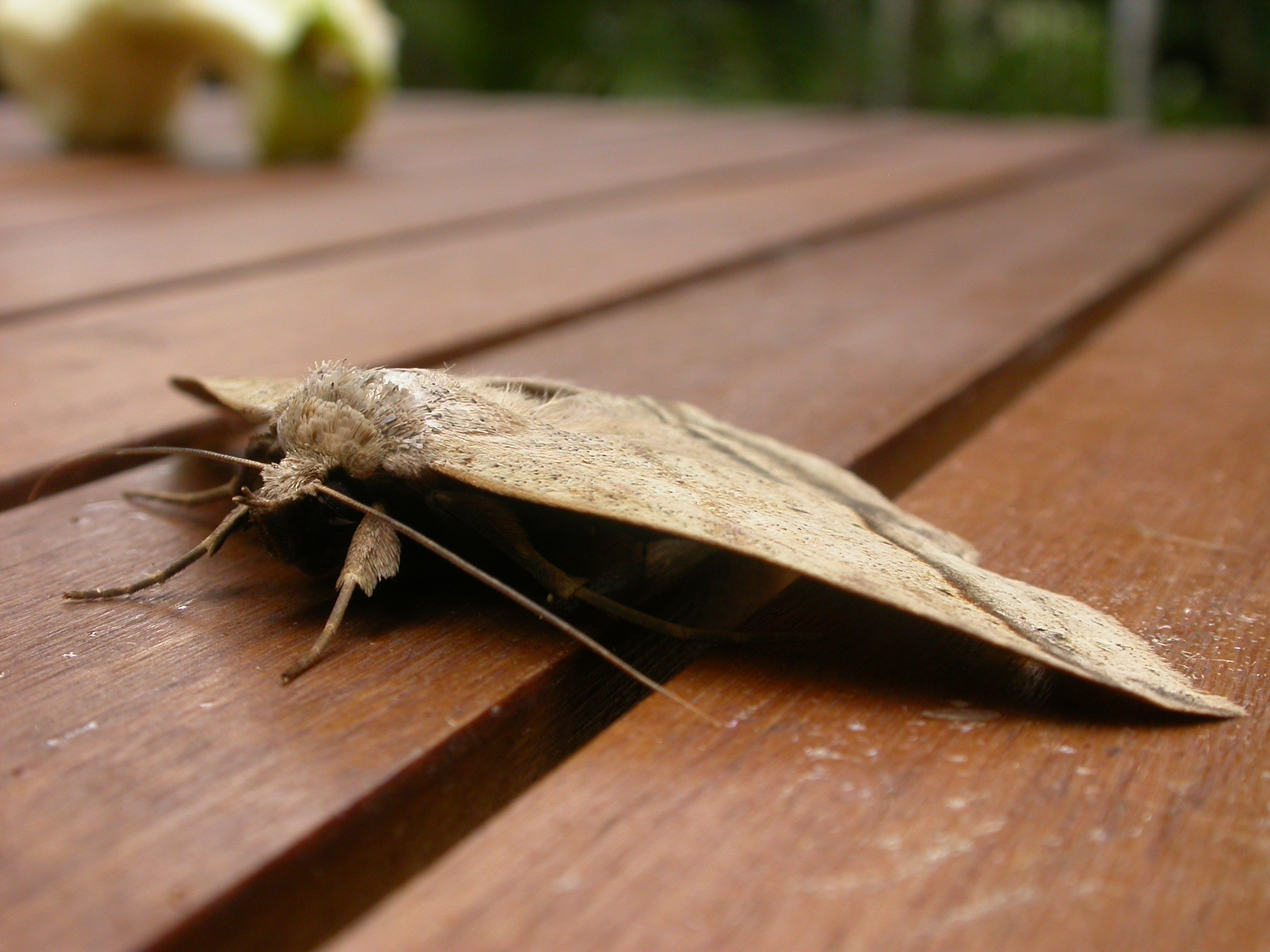

Scientific classification
- Domain: Eukaryota
- Kingdom: Animalia
- Phylum: Arthropoda
- Class: Insecta
- Order: Lepidoptera
- Superfamily: Noctuoidea
- Family: Erebidae
- Genus: Polydesmiola
- Species: P. meekii

Binomial name
- Polydesmiola meekii (T. P. Lucas, 1894)

Synonyms
- Agonista meekii Lucas, 1894

= Polydesmiola meekii =

Species of moth

Polydesmiola meekii is a species of moth of the family Erebidae first described by Thomas Pennington Lucas in 1894. It is found in the Australian states of Queensland and Western Australia.
