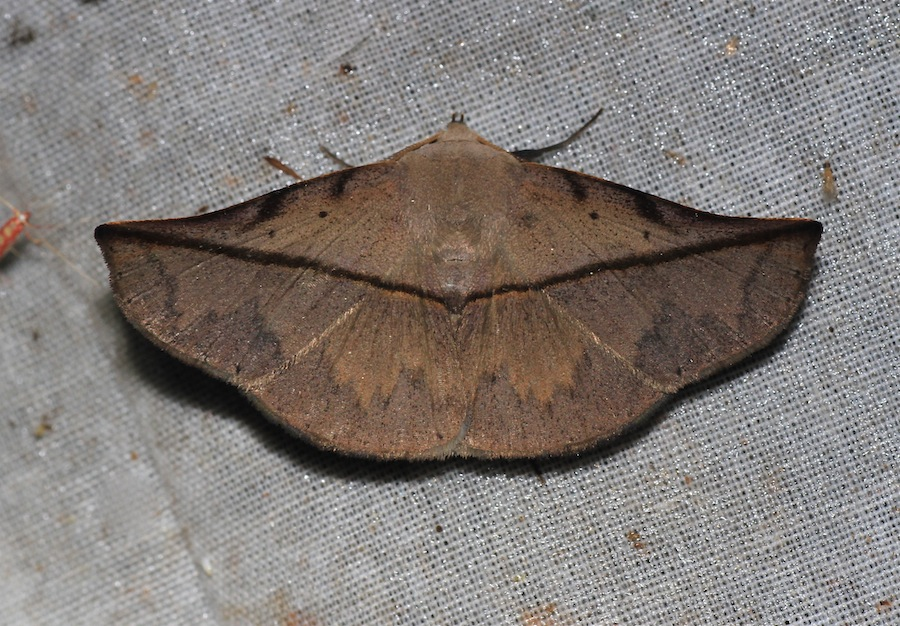
- Heterospila nigripalpis, Borneo

Scientific classification
- Kingdom: Animalia
- Phylum: Arthropoda
- Class: Insecta
- Order: Lepidoptera
- Superfamily: Noctuoidea
- Family: Erebidae
- Subfamily: Calpinae
- Genus: Heterospila; Guenée, [1852]

Synonyms
- Zinna (Walker); Iluza Walker, 1865

= Heterospila =

Genus of moths

Heterospila is a genus of noctuoid moths in the family Erebidae. The genus was erected by Achille Guenée in 1852.

== Species ==
- Heterospila fulgurea (Guenée 1852) — from the north-eastern Himalayas, Hainan, Thailand, Sumatra, Java, Borneo
- Heterospila nigripalpis (Walker 1869) — from India, Thailand, Sumatra, Borneo
