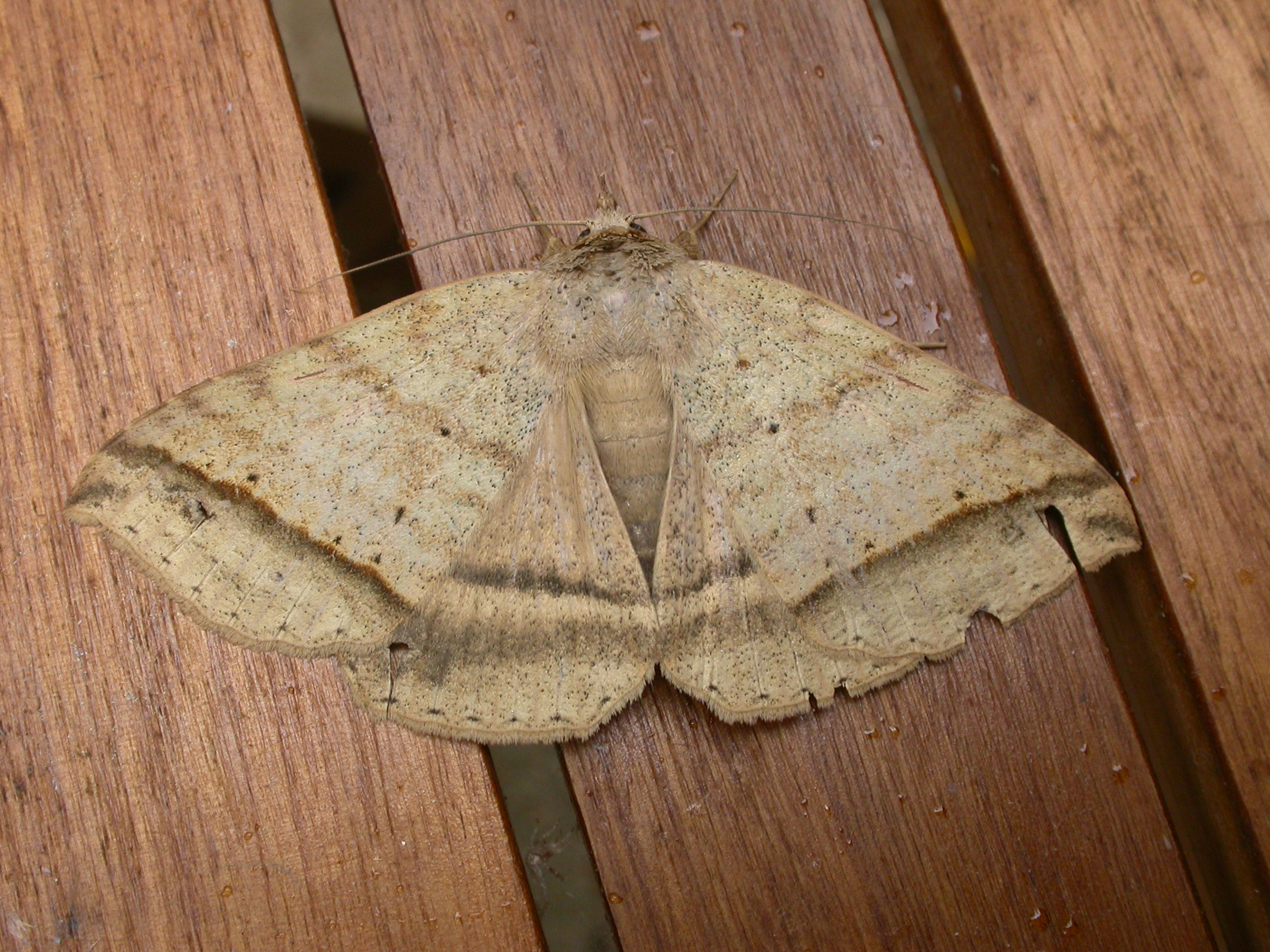
- Polydesmiola meekii

Scientific classification
- Domain: Eukaryota
- Kingdom: Animalia
- Phylum: Arthropoda
- Class: Insecta
- Order: Lepidoptera
- Superfamily: Noctuoidea
- Family: Erebidae
- Subfamily: Calpinae
- Genus: Polydesmiola; Strand, 1916

Synonyms
- Macrocarsia Hampson, 1926

= Polydesmiola =

Genus of moths

Polydesmiola is a genus of moths that belongs to the family Erebidae. The genus was described by Embrik Strand in 1916.

== Species ==
- Polydesmiola cochlearifer (Hulstaert, 1924) Kai Islands
- Polydesmiola gothica (Bethune-Baker, 1908) New Guinea
- Polydesmiola hebraica (Snellen, 1880) Sulawesi
- Polydesmiola holzi (Pagenstecher, 1884) Ambon Island
- Polydesmiola meekii (Lucas, 1894) Australia
- Polydesmiola niepelti Strand, 1916 Solomon Islands
