= Hopetounia =

Scientific classification
- Domain: Eukaryota
- Kingdom: Animalia
- Phylum: Arthropoda
- Class: Insecta
- Order: Lepidoptera
- Superfamily: Noctuoidea
- Family: Erebidae
- Subfamily: Calpinae
- Genus: Hopetounia; C. Swinhoe, 1902

Genus of moths

Hopetounia is a genus of moths of the family Erebidae. The genus was erected by Charles Swinhoe in 1902.

== Species ==
- Hopetounia albida Hampson, 1926 Australia
- Hopetounia carda Swinhoe, 1902 Western Australia
- Hopetounia marginata Hampson, 1926 Kenya
- Hopetounia pudica (Lower, 1903) Western Australia
