= Chodda =

Scientific classification
- Kingdom: Animalia
- Phylum: Arthropoda
- Class: Insecta
- Order: Lepidoptera
- Superfamily: Noctuoidea
- Family: Erebidae
- Subfamily: Calpinae
- Genus: Chodda; Walker, [1863]

Genus of moths

Chodda is a genus of moths of the family Erebidae. The genus was erected by Francis Walker in 1863.

== Species ==
- Chodda aeluropis (Meyrick, 1902)
- Chodda costiplaga (Bethune-Baker, 1906)
- Chodda ochreovenata (Bethune-Baker, 1906)
- Chodda sordidula Walker, [1863]
