= Lignicida =

Scientific classification
- Domain: Eukaryota
- Kingdom: Animalia
- Phylum: Arthropoda
- Class: Insecta
- Order: Lepidoptera
- Superfamily: Noctuoidea
- Family: Erebidae
- Subfamily: Calpinae
- Genus: Lignicida; C. Swinhoe, 1905

Genus of moths

Lignicida is a genus of moths of the family Erebidae. The genus was erected by Charles Swinhoe in 1905.

== Species ==
- Lignicida echana C. Swinhoe, 1905
- Lignicida grisechana Holloway, 2005
