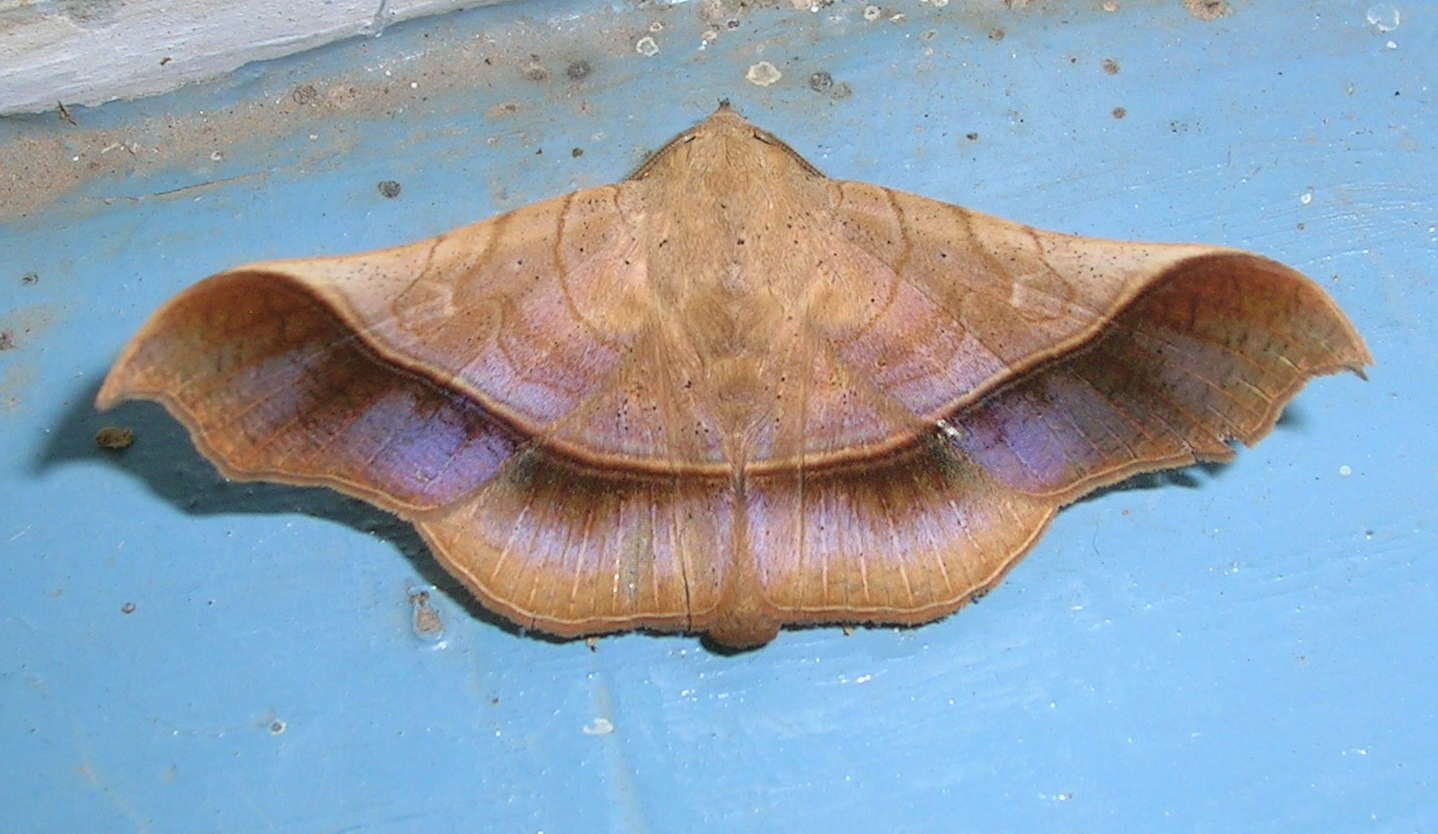

Scientific classification
- Domain: Eukaryota
- Kingdom: Animalia
- Phylum: Arthropoda
- Class: Insecta
- Order: Lepidoptera
- Superfamily: Noctuoidea
- Family: Erebidae
- Subfamily: Calpinae
- Genus: Chilkasa; Swinhoe, 1885
- Species: C. falcata

Binomial name
- Chilkasa falcata Swinhoe, 1885

Synonyms
- Generic: Acygonia Roepke, 1948; Specific: Pleurona perhamata Hampson, 1894; Acygonia difformis Roepke, 1948

= Chilkasa =

Genus of moths

Chilkasa is a monotypic moth genus in the family Erebidae. Its only species, Chilkasa falcata, is found in India, Thailand, Peninsular Malaysia, Sumatra, Borneo and the Philippines. Both the genus and the species were first described by Swinhoe in 1885.
