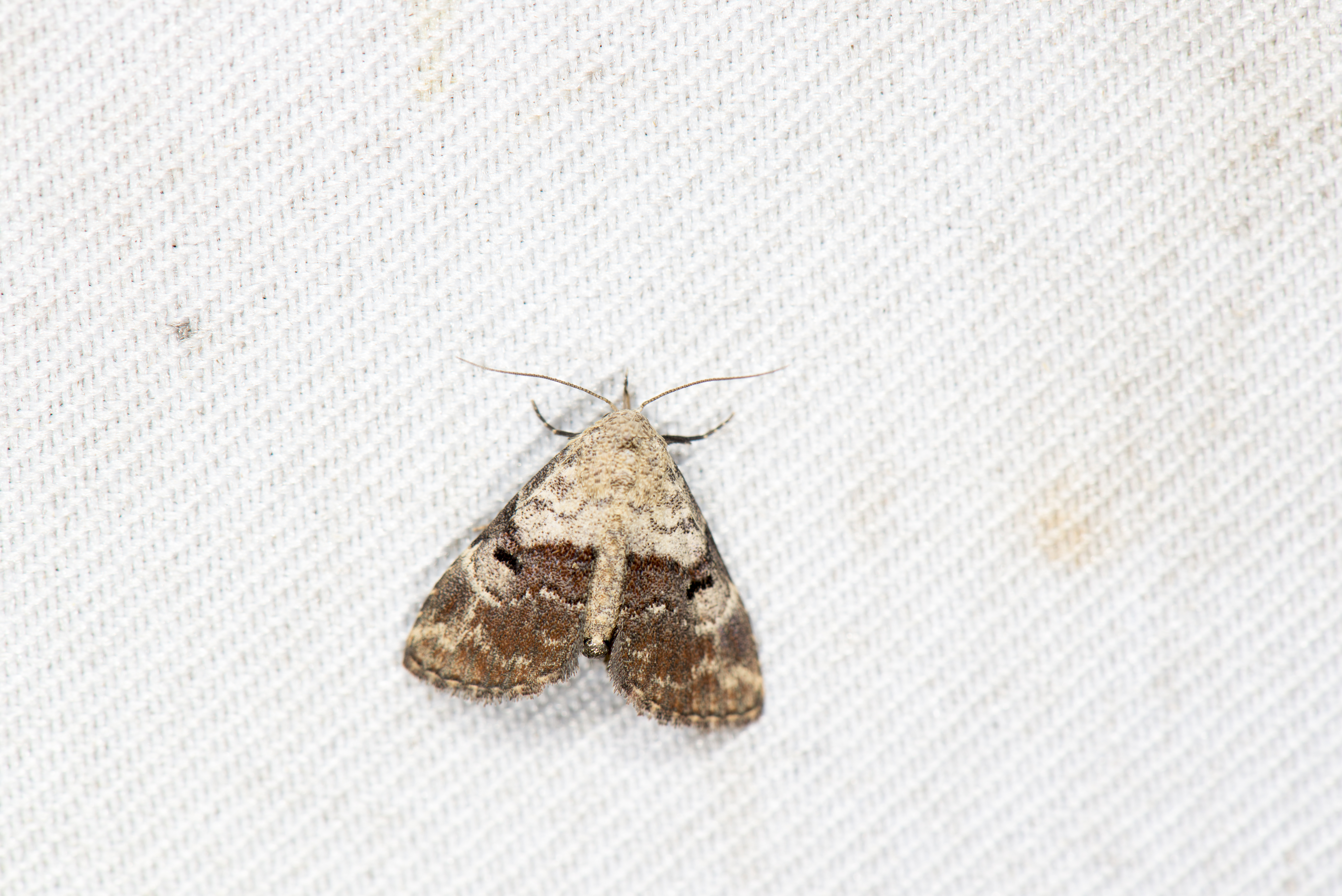
- A member of the genus Maguda

Scientific classification
- Kingdom: Animalia
- Phylum: Arthropoda
- Class: Insecta
- Order: Lepidoptera
- Superfamily: Noctuoidea
- Family: Erebidae
- Subfamily: Calpinae
- Genus: Maguda; Walker, [1866]

= Maguda =

Genus of moths

Maguda is a genus of moths of the family Erebidae found among the coast of East Asia and Northern Australia. The genus was erected by Francis Walker in 1866.

== Species ==
- Maguda immundalis Walker, [1866] Borneo
- Maguda multifasciata (Swinhoe, 1890) Myanmar
- Maguda palpalis (Walker, [1866])
- Maguda pilipes Hampson, 1926 Sri Lanka
- Maguda suffusa (Walker, 1863) Borneo
- Maguda wollastoni (Rothschild, 1915) New Guinea
