= Eubryopterella =

Scientific classification
- Domain: Eukaryota
- Kingdom: Animalia
- Phylum: Arthropoda
- Class: Insecta
- Order: Lepidoptera
- Superfamily: Noctuoidea
- Family: Erebidae
- Subfamily: Calpinae
- Genus: Eubryopterella; Roepke, 1938

Genus of moths

Eubryopterella is a genus of moths of the family Erebidae. The genus was described by Roepke in 1938.

== Species ==
- Eubryopterella vaneeckei Roepke, 1938
- Eubryopterella cinerea Holloway, 2005
- Eubryopterella triangulata Holloway, 2005
