= Crypsiprora =

Scientific classification
- Kingdom: Animalia
- Phylum: Arthropoda
- Class: Insecta
- Order: Lepidoptera
- Superfamily: Noctuoidea
- Family: Erebidae
- Subfamily: Calpinae
- Genus: Crypsiprora; Meyrick, 1902

Genus of moths

Crypsiprora is a genus of moths of the family Noctuidae.

== Species ==
- Crypsiprora ophiodesma Meyrick, 1902
- Crypsiprora orthogramma Turner, 1936
- Crypsiprora peratoscia Hampson, 1926
