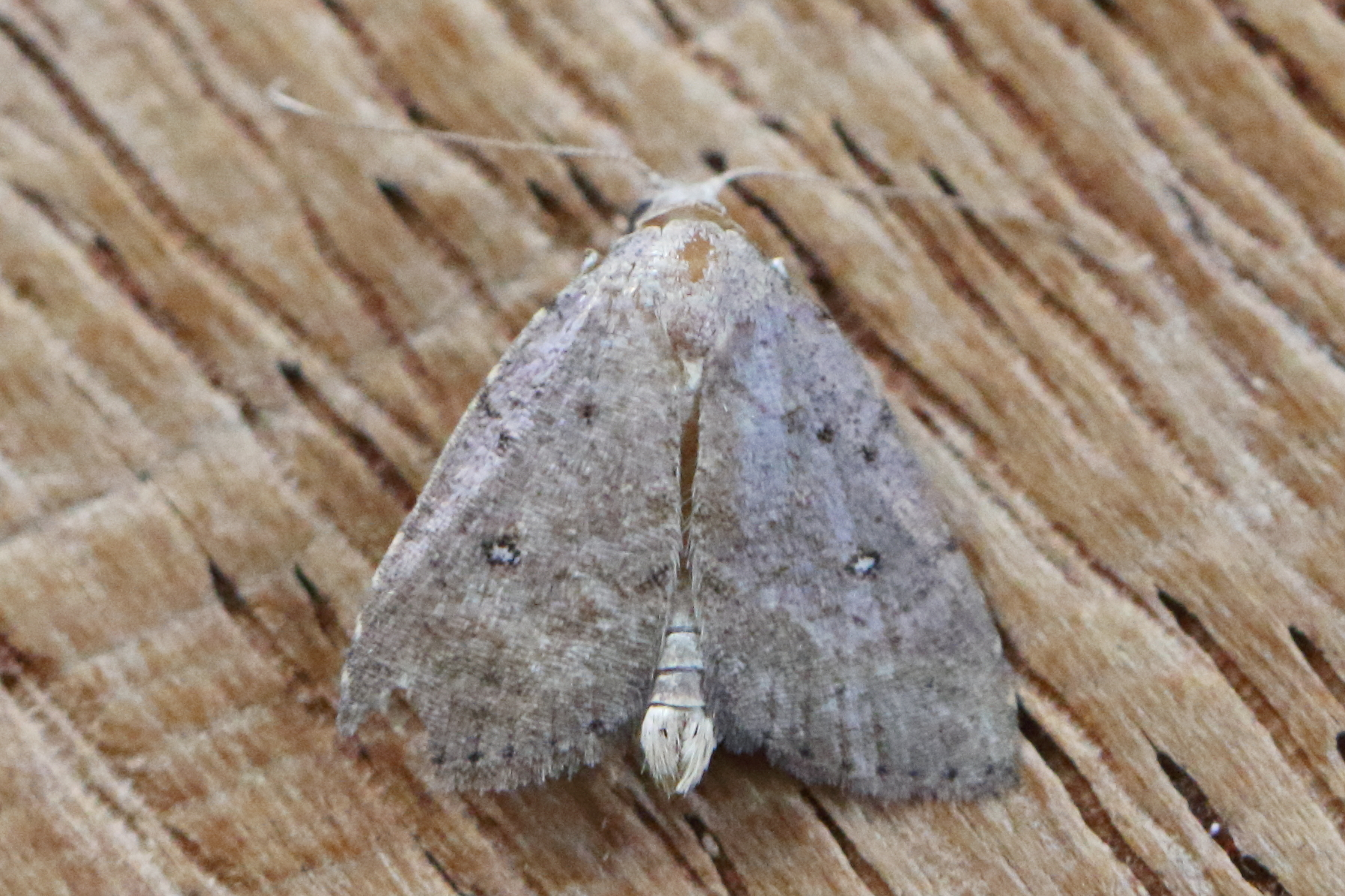
- Tolpiodes oligolasia

Scientific classification
- Kingdom: Animalia
- Phylum: Arthropoda
- Class: Insecta
- Order: Lepidoptera
- Superfamily: Noctuoidea
- Family: Erebidae
- Subfamily: Calpinae
- Genus: Tolpiodes; Hampson, 1926

= Tolpiodes =

Genus of moths

Tolpiodes is a genus of moths of the family Erebidae. The genus was erected by George Hampson in 1926.

== Species ==
- Tolpiodes aphanta (Turner, 1902) Queensland
- Tolpiodes brunnescens (Rothschild, 1915) New Guinea
- Tolpiodes discipuncta Hampson, 1926 New Guinea
- Tolpiodes endolasia Hampson, 1926 New Guinea
- Tolpiodes fasciata (Rothschild, 1913) New Guinea
- Tolpiodes melanoproctis Hampson, 1926 Queensland
- Tolpiodes micropis Hampson, 1926 New Guinea
- Tolpiodes oligolasia Hampson, 1926 New South Wales
