= Diascia transvitta =

Scientific classification
- Domain: Eukaryota
- Kingdom: Animalia
- Phylum: Arthropoda
- Class: Insecta
- Order: Lepidoptera
- Superfamily: Noctuoidea
- Family: Erebidae
- Genus: Diascia
- Species: D. transvitta

Binomial name
- Diascia transvitta Moore, 1887

Species of moth

Diascia transvitta is a moth of the family Noctuidae first described by Frederic Moore in 1887. It is found in Sri Lanka.

The male has finely fasciculate (bundled) antennae.
