= Eurythmus =

Scientific classification
- Domain: Eukaryota
- Kingdom: Animalia
- Phylum: Arthropoda
- Class: Insecta
- Order: Lepidoptera
- Superfamily: Noctuoidea
- Family: Erebidae
- Subfamily: Calpinae
- Genus: Eurythmus; Butler, 1886
- Species: E. bryophiloides

Binomial name
- Eurythmus bryophiloides Butler, 1886

Synonyms
- Generic: Ammophanes Turner, 1932; Specific: Ammophanes deserticola Turner, 1932

Genus of moths

Eurythmus is a monotypic moth genus of the family Noctuidae. Its only species, Eurythmus bryophiloides, is found in Australia in Western Australia, the Northern Territory and Queensland. Both the genus and the species were first described by Arthur Gardiner Butler in 1886.
