= Arthisma =

Scientific classification
- Kingdom: Animalia
- Phylum: Arthropoda
- Clade: Pancrustacea
- Class: Insecta
- Order: Lepidoptera
- Superfamily: Noctuoidea
- Family: Erebidae
- Subfamily: Calpinae
- Genus: Arthisma; Moore, 1883

Genus of moths

Arthisma is a genus of moths of the family Erebidae. They occur in South and Southeast Asia to Australia.

== Species ==
There are four recognized species:

- Arthisma amisa (Swinhoe, 1906)
- Arthisma pectinata Wileman & West, 1929
- Arthisma rectilinea Roepke, 1948
- Arthisma scissuralis Moore, 1883
