= Prolyncestis =

Scientific classification
- Kingdom: Animalia
- Phylum: Arthropoda
- Class: Insecta
- Order: Lepidoptera
- Superfamily: Noctuoidea
- Family: Erebidae
- Subfamily: Calpinae
- Genus: Prolyncestis; Viette, 1971
- Species: P. biplagiata

Binomial name
- Prolyncestis biplagiata Viette, 1971

Genus of moths

Prolyncestis is a monotypic moth genus of the family Erebidae. Its only species, Prolyncestis biplagiata, is found on Madagascar. Both the genus and species were first described by Viette in 1971.
