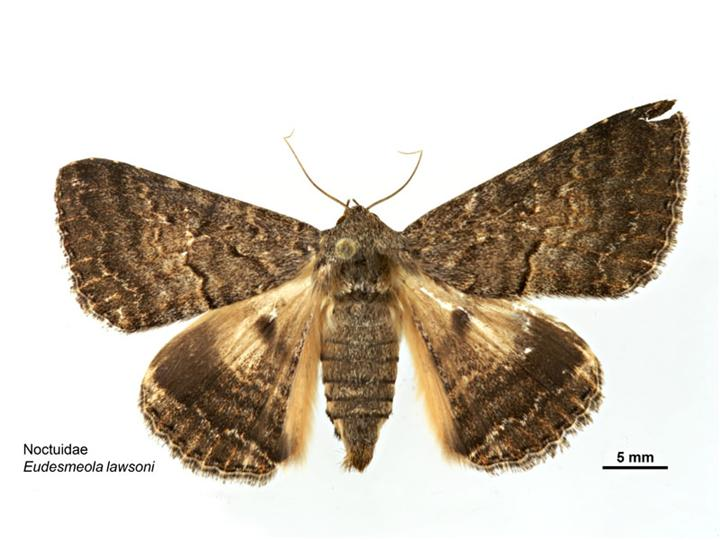
- Dorsal view
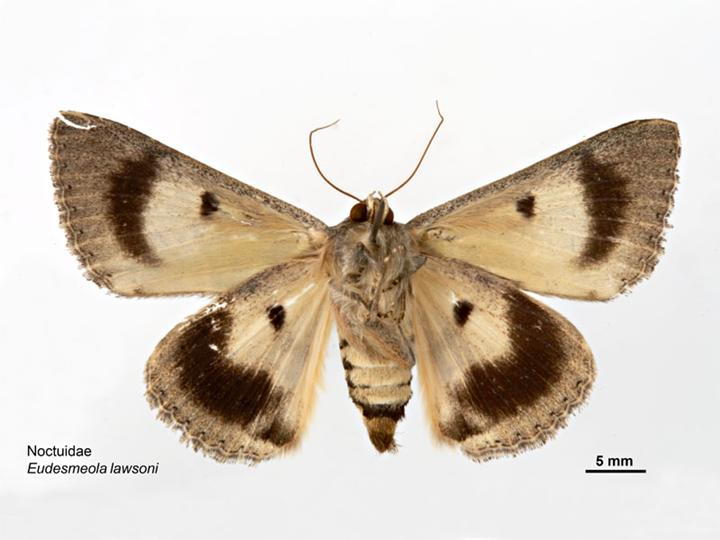
- Ventral view

Scientific classification
- Kingdom: Animalia
- Phylum: Arthropoda
- Class: Insecta
- Order: Lepidoptera
- Superfamily: Noctuoidea
- Family: Erebidae
- Subfamily: Calpinae
- Genus: Eudesmeola; Hampson, 1926
- Species: E. lawsoni

Binomial name
- Eudesmeola lawsoni (Felder & Rogenhofer, 1874)

Synonyms
- Diatenes lawsoni Felder & Rogenhofer, 1874; Polydesma pullaria Swinhoe, 1902

= Eudesmeola =

Genus of moths

Eudesmeola is a monotypic moth genus of the family Erebidae erected by George Hampson in 1926. Its only species, Eudesmeola lawsoni, or Lawson's night moth, was first described by Felder and Rogenhofer in 1874. It is found in the dry inland areas of Australia.

The wingspan is about 70 mm.

The larvae feed on Geijera parviflora.
