= Facidina =

Scientific classification
- Domain: Eukaryota
- Kingdom: Animalia
- Phylum: Arthropoda
- Class: Insecta
- Order: Lepidoptera
- Superfamily: Noctuoidea
- Family: Erebidae
- Subfamily: Calpinae
- Genus: Facidina; Hampson, 1926

Genus of moths

Facidina is a genus of moths of the family Noctuidae.

== Species ==
- Facidina polystigma Lower, 1903
- Facidina spilophracta Turner, 1933
