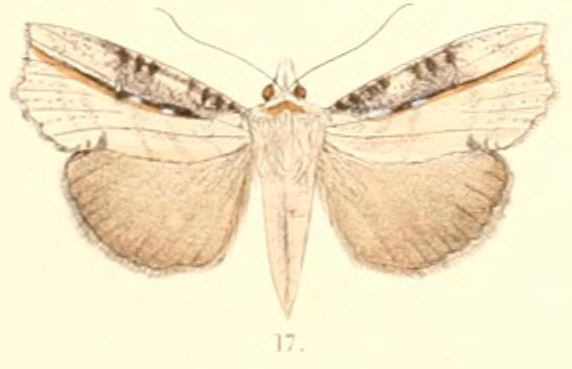
- Cephena costata

Scientific classification
- Domain: Eukaryota
- Kingdom: Animalia
- Phylum: Arthropoda
- Class: Insecta
- Order: Lepidoptera
- Superfamily: Noctuoidea
- Family: Erebidae
- Subfamily: Calpinae
- Genus: Cephena; Moore, 1882

= Cephena =

Genus of moths

Cephena is a genus of moths of the family Erebidae. The genus was erected by Frederic Moore in 1882.

== Species ==
- Cephena costata Moore, 1882 (India, Taiwan, Thailand, Sumatra, Borneo)
- Cephena sundana Holloway (Borneo, Peninsular Malaysia, Sumatra)
