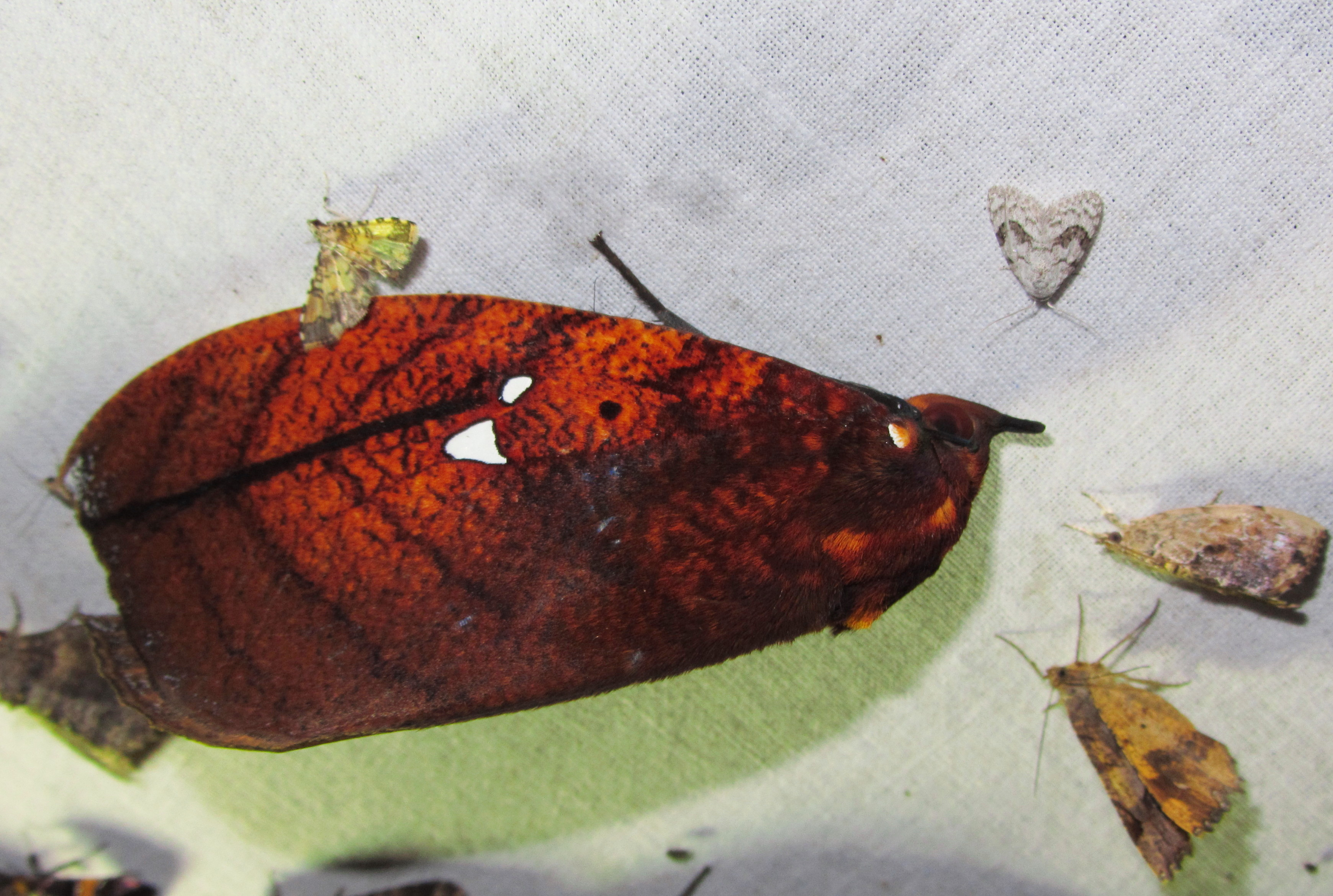
- Gloriana ornata

Scientific classification
- Domain: Eukaryota
- Kingdom: Animalia
- Phylum: Arthropoda
- Class: Insecta
- Order: Lepidoptera
- Superfamily: Noctuoidea
- Family: Erebidae
- Subfamily: Calpinae
- Genus: Gloriana; Kirby, 1897

= Gloriana (moth) =

Genus of moths

Gloriana is a genus of moths of the family Erebidae. The genus was erected by William Forsell Kirby in 1897.

== Species ==
- Gloriana dentilinea (Leech, 1900)
- Gloriana ornata (Moore, 1882)
