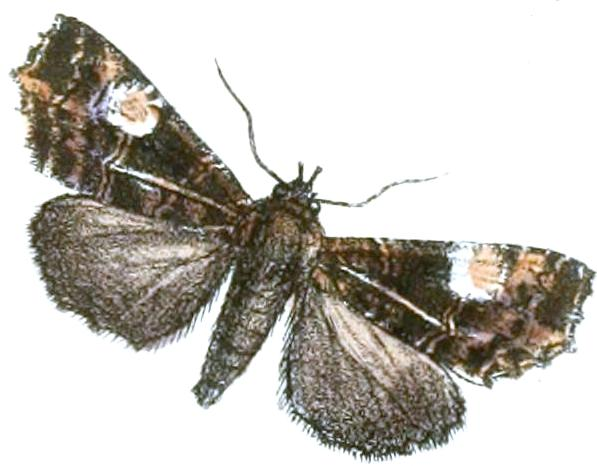
- Lineopalpa horsfieldi

Scientific classification
- Domain: Eukaryota
- Kingdom: Animalia
- Phylum: Arthropoda
- Class: Insecta
- Order: Lepidoptera
- Superfamily: Noctuoidea
- Family: Erebidae
- Subfamily: Calpinae
- Genus: Lineopalpa; Guenee 1852

Synonyms
- Paragonitis Bethune-Baker, 1906

= Lineopalpa =

Genus of moths

Lineopalpa is a genus of moths of the family Noctuidae.

== Species ==
- Lineopalpa birena Holloway, 1976
- Lineopalpa horsfieldi Guenee, 1852
- Lineopalpa inexpectata (Gaede, 1940)
- Lineopalpa orsara Swinhoe, 1903
- Lineopalpa rufa (Bethune-Baker, 1906)
