= Calymniops =

Scientific classification
- Kingdom: Animalia
- Phylum: Arthropoda
- Class: Insecta
- Order: Lepidoptera
- Superfamily: Noctuoidea
- Family: Erebidae
- Subfamily: Calpinae
- Genus: Calymniops; Hampson, 1926
- Species: C. trapezata

Binomial name
- Calymniops trapezata (Moore, [1887])

Synonyms
- Elydna trapezata Moore, [1887]

Genus of moths

Calymniops is a monotypic moth genus of the family Erebidae erected by George Hampson in 1926. Its only species, Calymniops trapezata, was first described by Frederic Moore in 1887. It is found in India, Sri Lanka, Japan and parts of North America.

== Description ==
Its wingspan is about 32 mm.
