= Lophozancla =

Scientific classification
- Domain: Eukaryota
- Kingdom: Animalia
- Phylum: Arthropoda
- Class: Insecta
- Order: Lepidoptera
- Superfamily: Noctuoidea
- Family: Erebidae
- Subfamily: Calpinae
- Genus: Lophozancla; Turner, 1932
- Species: L. prolixa

Binomial name
- Lophozancla prolixa Turner, 1932

Genus of moths

Lophozancla is a monotypic moth genus of the family Erebidae. Its only species, Lophozancla prolixa, is found in Australia's Western Australia and the Northern Territory. Both the genus and the species were first described by Turner in 1932.

The wingspan is around 40 mm.
