= Raphiscopa =

Scientific classification
- Kingdom: Animalia
- Phylum: Arthropoda
- Class: Insecta
- Order: Lepidoptera
- Superfamily: Noctuoidea
- Family: Erebidae
- Subfamily: Calpinae
- Genus: Raphiscopa; Hampson, 1925

Synonyms
- Egnasides Hampson, 1926

Genus of moths

Raphiscopa is a genus of moths of the family Erebidae. The genus was erected by George Hampson in 1925.

== Species ==
- Raphiscopa albipunctata Holloway, 2008 Borneo
- Raphiscopa albireniformis Holloway, 2008 Borneo
- Raphiscopa egnasidoides Holloway, 2008 Borneo
- Raphiscopa hirsuta Holloway, 2008 Borneo, Sumatra, Peninsular Malaysia
- Raphiscopa mulundulata Holloway, 2008 Borneo
- Raphiscopa medialis Holloway, 2008 Borneo
- Raphiscopa rudmuna (C. Swinhoe, 1905) Borneo
- Raphiscopa serrata Prout, 1928 Borneo
- Raphiscopa undulata (Felder & Rogenhofer, 1874) Java, Peninsular Malaysia, Sumatra, Borneo
- Raphiscopa viridialis Holloway, 2008 Borneo
