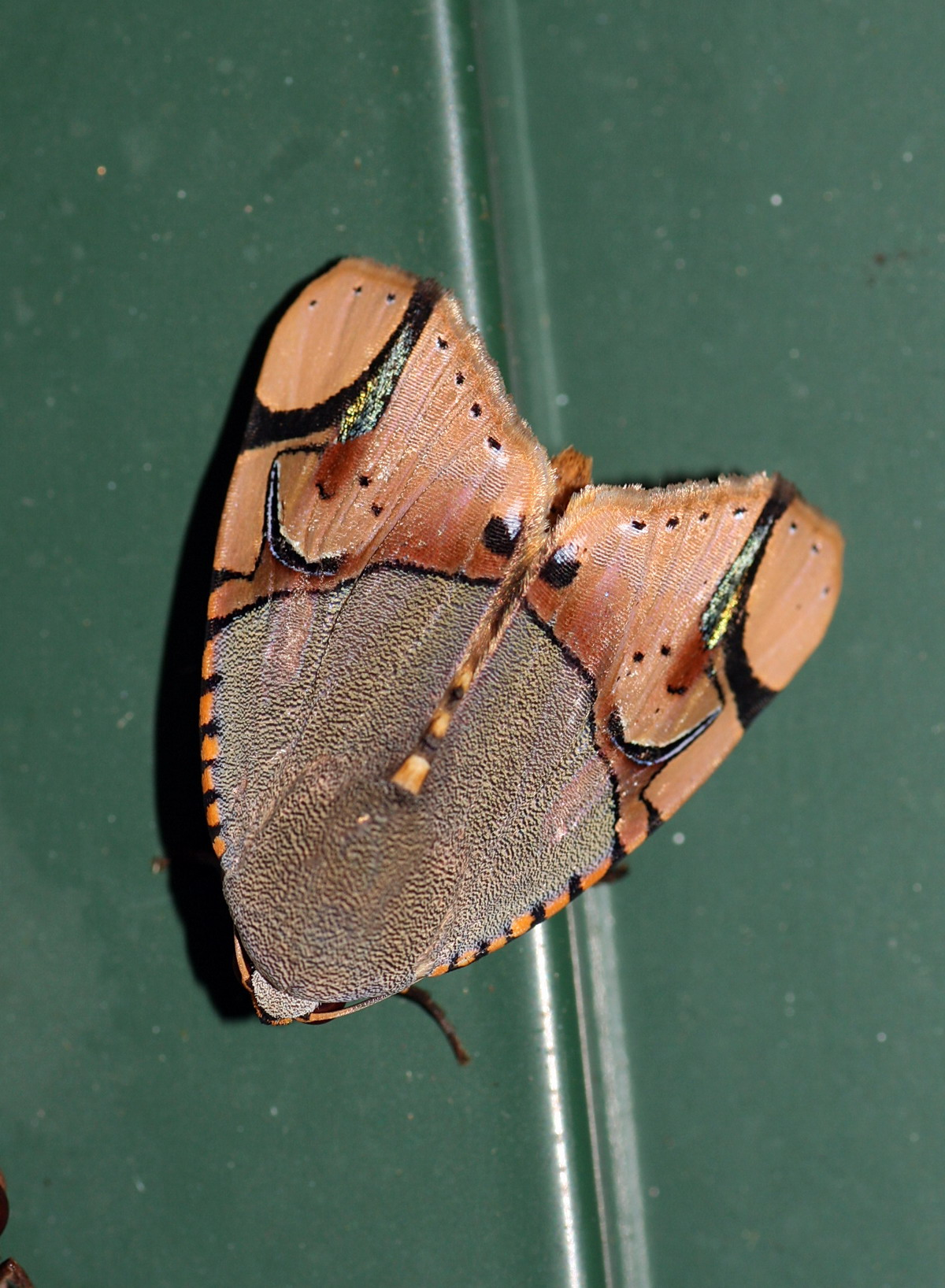
- Ramadasa fumipennis

Scientific classification
- Kingdom: Animalia
- Phylum: Arthropoda
- Class: Insecta
- Order: Lepidoptera
- Superfamily: Noctuoidea
- Family: Erebidae
- Subfamily: Calpinae
- Genus: Ramadasa; Moore, 1877

= Ramadasa =

Genus of moths

Ramadasa is a genus of moths of the family Noctuidae described by Frederic Moore in 1877.

== Description ==
Palpi naked and upturned, flattened and reaching vertex of head, where the third joint minute. Antennae simple. Thorax and abdomen smoothly scaled. Tibia spineless and slightly clothed with hairy. Forewings with oblique outer margin from vein 5 to outer angle. Vein 8 and 9 anastomosing to form an areole.

== Species ==
- Ramadasa crystallina Lower, 1899
- Ramadasa fumipennis Warren, 1916
- Ramadasa pavo Walker, 1856
- Ramadasa plumbeola Warren, 1916
- Ramadasa pratti Bethune-Baker, 1908
