= Hemipsectra =

Scientific classification
- Kingdom: Animalia
- Phylum: Arthropoda
- Class: Insecta
- Order: Lepidoptera
- Superfamily: Noctuoidea
- Family: Erebidae
- Subfamily: Calpinae
- Genus: Hemipsectra; Hampson, 1891

Genus of moths

Hemipsectra is a genus of moths of the family Erebidae. The genus was erected by George Hampson in 1891.

The Global Lepidoptera Names Index gives this name as a synonym of Gesonia Walker, [1859].

== Species ==
- Hemipsectra fallax (Butler, 1879) Japan
- Hemipsectra plumipars (Hampson, 1891) Nilgiri Mountains of India
