= Stenocarsia =

Scientific classification
- Kingdom: Animalia
- Phylum: Arthropoda
- Class: Insecta
- Order: Lepidoptera
- Superfamily: Noctuoidea
- Family: Erebidae
- Subfamily: Calpinae
- Genus: Stenocarsia; Hampson, 1926

Genus of moths

Stenocarsia is a genus of moths of the family Erebidae. The genus was erected by George Hampson in 1926.

== Species ==
- Stenocarsia metaplatys Hampson, 1926 New Guinea
- Stenocarsia nebulosa (Rothschild, 1915) New Guinea
- Stenocarsia solomonis Hampson, 1926 Solomon Islands
- Stenocarsia sthenoptera (Swinhoe, 1895) India (Assam)
