= Thoracolophotos =

Scientific classification
- Domain: Eukaryota
- Kingdom: Animalia
- Phylum: Arthropoda
- Class: Insecta
- Order: Lepidoptera
- Superfamily: Noctuoidea
- Family: Erebidae
- Subfamily: Calpinae
- Genus: Thoracolophotos; Bethune-Baker, 1906

Genus of moths

Thoracolophotos is a genus of moths of the family Erebidae. The genus was erected by George Thomas Bethune-Baker in 1906.

== Species ==
- Thoracolophotos albilimitata Hampson, 1926 Borneo
- Thoracolophotos ekeikei Bethune-Baker, 1906 New Guinea
- Thoracolophotos javanicus Roepke, 1935 western Java
