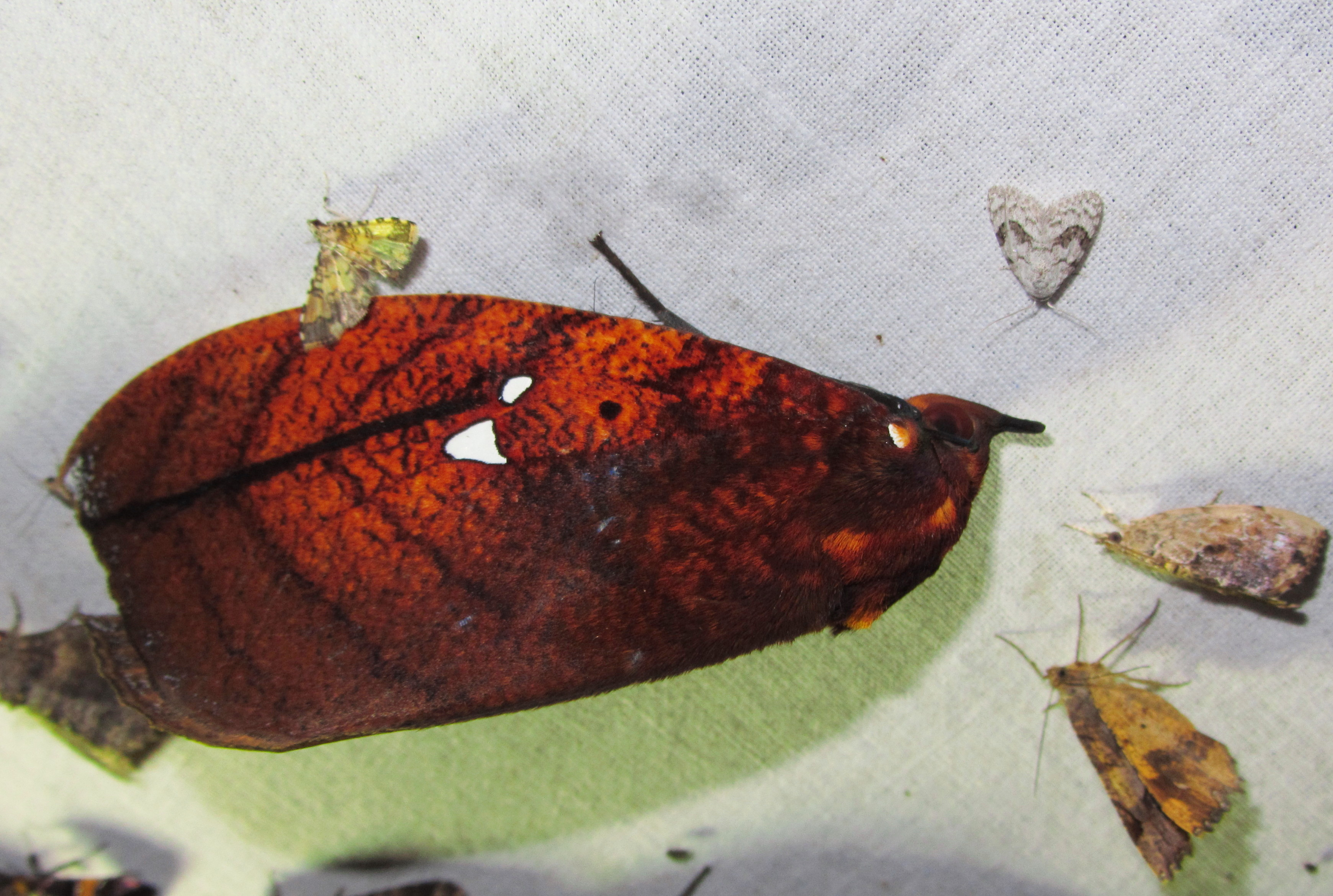

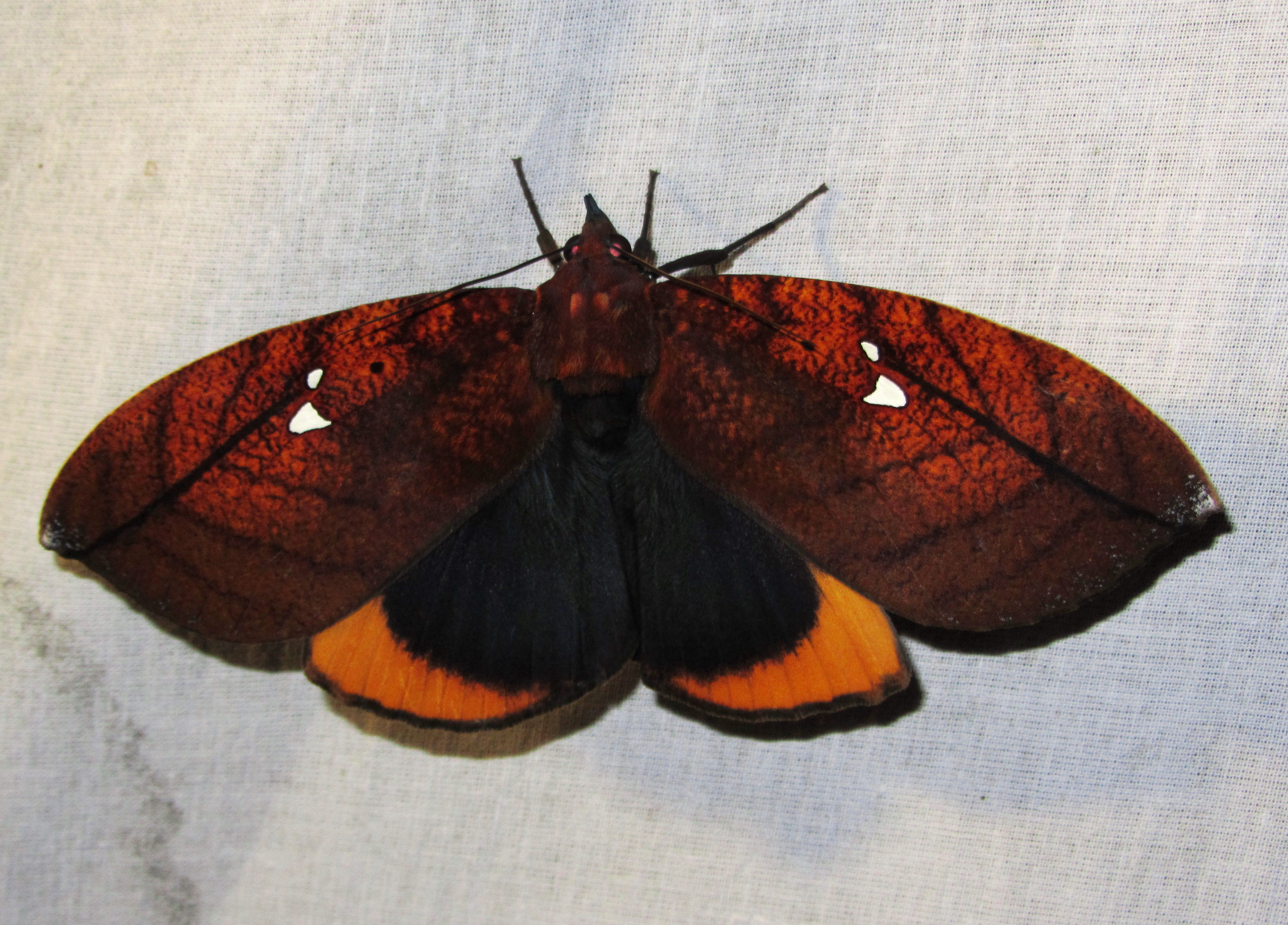

Scientific classification
- Domain: Eukaryota
- Kingdom: Animalia
- Phylum: Arthropoda
- Class: Insecta
- Order: Lepidoptera
- Superfamily: Noctuoidea
- Family: Erebidae
- Genus: Gloriana
- Species: G. ornata

Binomial name
- Gloriana ornata (Moore, 1882)

Synonyms
- Phyllodes ornata Moore, 1882; Miniodes ornata

= Gloriana ornata =

Species of moth

Gloriana ornata is a species of moth in the family Noctuidae. It is found in Nepal and India.
