= Orthozancla =

Scientific classification
- Domain: Eukaryota
- Kingdom: Animalia
- Phylum: Arthropoda
- Class: Insecta
- Order: Lepidoptera
- Superfamily: Noctuoidea
- Family: Erebidae
- Subfamily: Calpinae
- Genus: Orthozancla; Turner, 1933
- Species: O. rhythmotypa

Binomial name
- Orthozancla rhythmotypa Turner, 1933

Genus of moths

Orthozancla is a monotypic moth genus of the family Erebidae. Its only species, Orthozancla rhythmotypa, is found in the Australian state of Queensland. Both the genus and species were first described by Turner in 1933.

The wingspan is about 25 mm.
