= Conosema =

Scientific classification
- Kingdom: Animalia
- Phylum: Arthropoda
- Class: Insecta
- Order: Lepidoptera
- Superfamily: Noctuoidea
- Family: Erebidae
- Subfamily: Calpinae
- Genus: Conosema; Hampson, 1926

Genus of moths

Conosema is a genus of moths of the family Erebidae. The genus was erected by George Hampson in 1926.

== Species ==
- Conosema alfura (Felder & Rogenhofer, 1874) Sulawesi
- Conosema pratti (Bethune-Baker, 1908) New Guinea
