= Malatrogia =

Scientific classification
- Kingdom: Animalia
- Phylum: Arthropoda
- Class: Insecta
- Order: Lepidoptera
- Superfamily: Noctuoidea
- Family: Erebidae
- Subfamily: Calpinae
- Genus: Malatrogia; Hampson, 1926
- Species: M. castanitis

Binomial name
- Malatrogia castanitis (Hampson, 1902)

Genus of moths

Malatrogia is a monotypic moth genus of the family Erebidae. Its only species, Malatrogia castanitis, is found in Meghalaya, India. The genus was described by George Hampson in 1926, while the species had been described by the same author in 1902.
