= Parapadna =

Scientific classification
- Kingdom: Animalia
- Phylum: Arthropoda
- Class: Insecta
- Order: Lepidoptera
- Superfamily: Noctuoidea
- Family: Erebidae
- Subfamily: Calpinae
- Genus: Parapadna; Hampson, 1926

Genus of moths

Parapadna is a genus of moths of the family Erebidae. The genus was erected by George Hampson in 1926.

== Species ==
- Parapadna placospila (Turner, 1908) Queensland
- Parapadna plumbea (Rothschild, 1915) New Guinea
- Parapadna zonophora (Turner, 1908) Queensland
