= Metaphoenia =

Scientific classification
- Kingdom: Animalia
- Phylum: Arthropoda
- Class: Insecta
- Order: Lepidoptera
- Superfamily: Noctuoidea
- Family: Erebidae
- Subfamily: Calpinae
- Genus: Metaphoenia; Hampson, 1926

Genus of moths

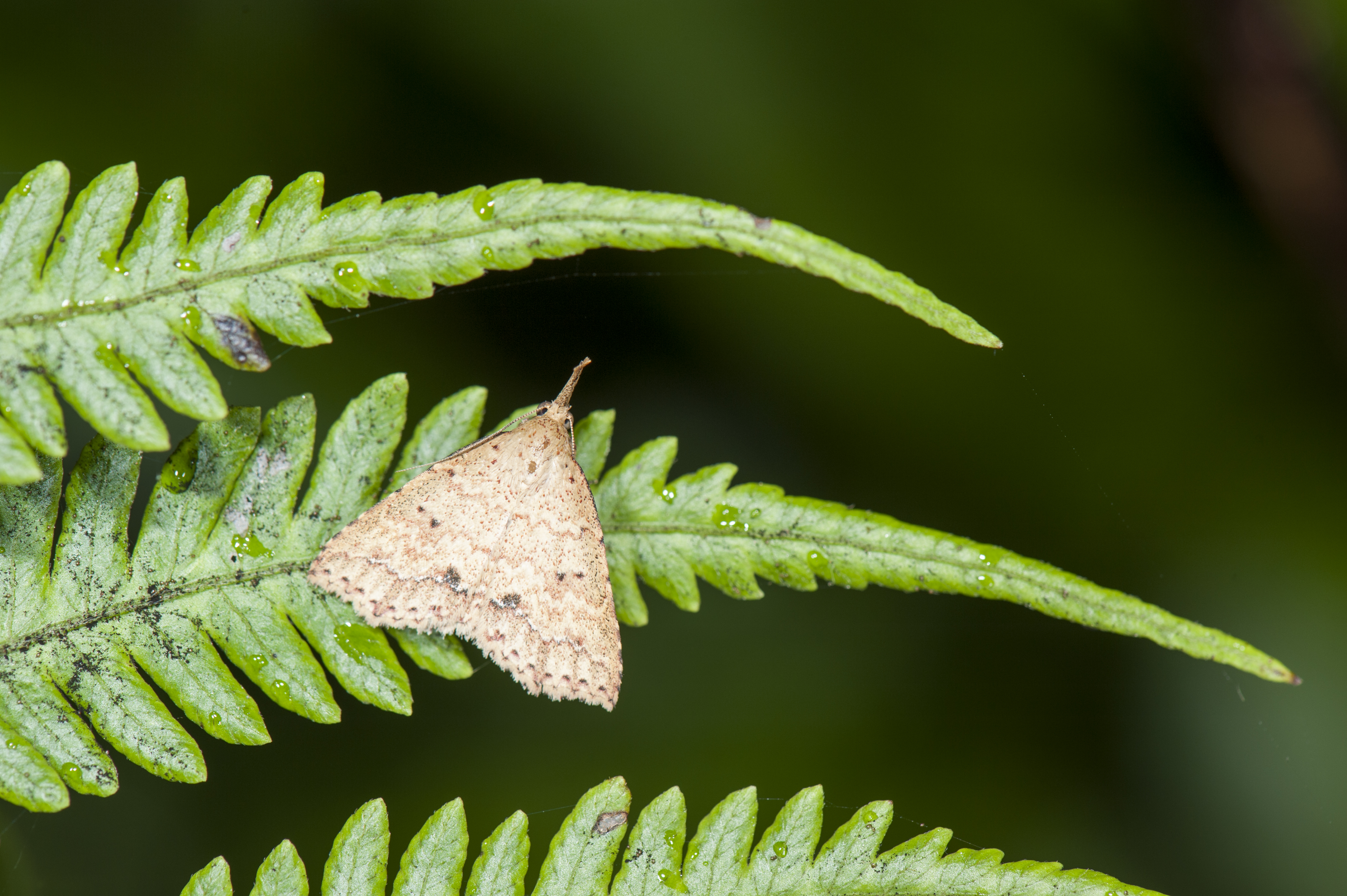
Picture of a Metaphoenia

Metaphoenia is a genus of moths of the family Erebidae. The genus was erected by George Hampson in 1926.

== Species ==
- Metaphoenia amelaena Hampson, 1926 Solomon Islands
- Metaphoenia carneipennis Prout, 1926
- Metaphoenia incongrualis (Walker, [1859]) Sri Lanka, Borneo
- Metaphoenia plagifera (Walker, 1864) Borneo
- Metaphoenia plagifera Walker, 1864
- Metaphoenia rectifascia Holloway, 2005
- Metaphoenia rhodias (Turner, 1908) Queensland
- Metaphoenia scobinata Holloway, 2005
