= Savara (moth) =

Scientific classification
- Kingdom: Animalia
- Phylum: Arthropoda
- Class: Insecta
- Order: Lepidoptera
- Superfamily: Noctuoidea
- Family: Erebidae
- Subfamily: Calpinae
- Genus: Savara; Walker, 1862

Synonyms
- Pseudogonitis Hampson, 1894

Genus of moths

Savara is a genus of moths of the family Erebidae. The genus was erected by Francis Walker in 1862.

== Species ==
There are five or six recognized species:

- Savara amisa Swinhoe, 1906 western Sumatra
- Savara anomioides (Walker, 1864) Borneo
- Savara biradulata Holloway Borneo
- Savara contraria Walker, 1862 Borneo, Singapore, New Guinea
- Savara latimargo (Walker, [1858]) India, Myanmar, Borneo, Philippines, Sulawesi, Moluccas, New Georgia, Queensland
- Savara pallidapex Holloway Borneo

The Global Lepidoptera Index recognizes Savara amisa as Arthisma amisa.
