= Mithila lichenosa =

Scientific classification
- Kingdom: Animalia
- Phylum: Arthropoda
- Clade: Pancrustacea
- Class: Insecta
- Order: Lepidoptera
- Superfamily: Noctuoidea
- Family: Erebidae
- Subfamily: Calpinae
- Genus: Mithila; Moore, 1882
- Species: M. lichenosa

Binomial name
- Mithila lichenosa Moore, 1882

Species of moth

Mithila lichenosa is the only species in the monotypic moth genus Mithila of the family Erebidae. It is endemic to the border area of southern and northern Nepal, and is found in the Janakpur Zone. Both the genus and species were first described by Frederic Moore in 1882.
