= Olyssa =

Scientific classification
- Kingdom: Animalia
- Phylum: Arthropoda
- Class: Insecta
- Order: Lepidoptera
- Superfamily: Noctuoidea
- Family: Erebidae
- Subfamily: Calpinae
- Genus: Olyssa; Walker, 1858
- Species: O. calamitosa

Binomial name
- Olyssa calamitosa Walker, 1858

Synonyms
- Eudesmeola inscripta Turner, 1932

Genus of moths

Olyssa is a monotypic moth genus of the family Erebidae. Its only species, Olyssa calamitosa, is found in Australia in Western Australia and the Northern Territory. Both the genus and the species were first described by Francis Walker in 1858.

The wingspan is about 40 mm.
