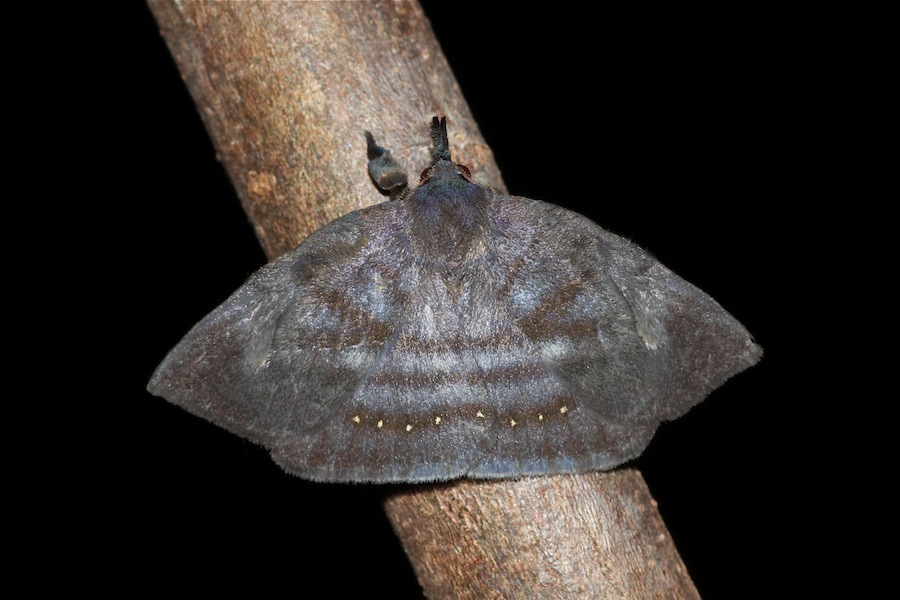
- Male Rhynchodina molybdota in Borneo

Scientific classification
- Kingdom: Animalia
- Phylum: Arthropoda
- Class: Insecta
- Order: Lepidoptera
- Superfamily: Noctuoidea
- Family: Erebidae
- Subfamily: Calpinae
- Genus: Rhynchodina; Hampson, [1926]
- Species: R. molybdota

Binomial name
- Rhynchodina molybdota Hampson, 1926

Synonyms
- Calesiodes punctigera Roepke, 1941

= Rhynchodina =

Genus of moths

Rhynchodina is a monotypic moth genus in the family Erebidae. Its only species, Rhynchodina molybdota, is known from Myanmar, Borneo and Sumatra. Both the genus and the species were first described by George Hampson in 1926.

It is uncommon in lowland and hill forests. The species is characterized by significant sexual dimorphism with males having a prominent, dorsally directed fringe along the forewing costa that continues from the midpoint of the costa into the wing in a crescent shaped fold.
