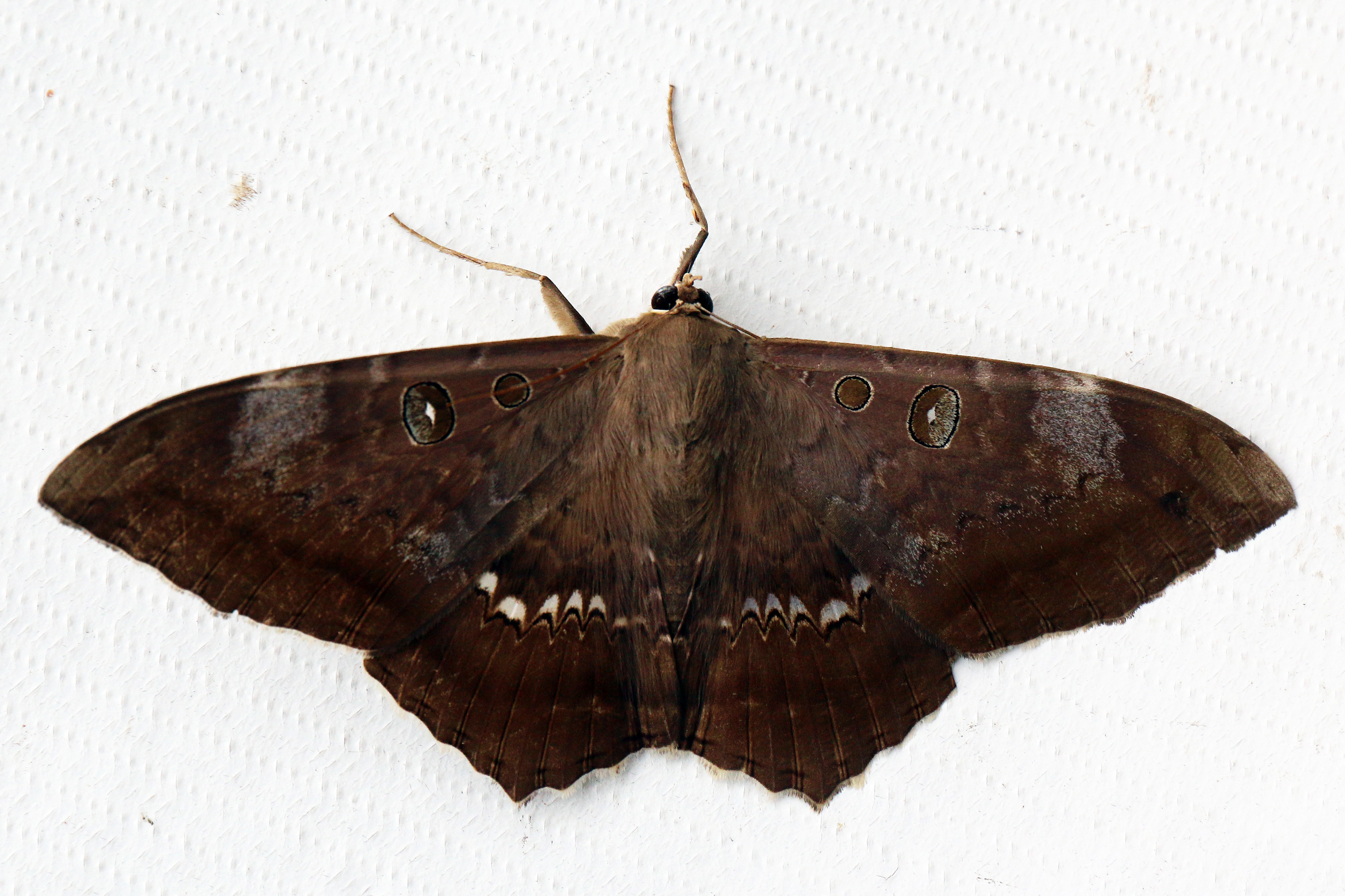
- Cyclopis caecutiens from Brazil

Scientific classification
- Kingdom: Animalia
- Phylum: Arthropoda
- Clade: Pancrustacea
- Class: Insecta
- Order: Lepidoptera
- Superfamily: Noctuoidea
- Family: Erebidae
- Subfamily: Calpinae
- Genus: Cyclopis

= Cyclopis =

Genus of moths

Cyclopis is a genus of moths in the family Erebidae.
