= Rhosologia =

Scientific classification
- Kingdom: Animalia
- Phylum: Arthropoda
- Class: Insecta
- Order: Lepidoptera
- Superfamily: Noctuoidea
- Family: Erebidae
- Subfamily: Calpinae
- Genus: Rhosologia; Walker, 1865

Genus of moths

Rhosologia is a genus of moths of the family Noctuidae.

== Species ==
- Rhosologia porrecta Walker, 1865
- Rhosologia stigmaphiles Dyar, 1914
