= Heterormista =

Scientific classification
- Domain: Eukaryota
- Kingdom: Animalia
- Phylum: Arthropoda
- Class: Insecta
- Order: Lepidoptera
- Superfamily: Noctuoidea
- Family: Erebidae
- Subfamily: Calpinae
- Genus: Heterormista; C. Swinhoe, 1901

Genus of moths

Heterormista is a genus of moths of the family Erebidae. The genus was erected by Charles Swinhoe in 1901.

== Species ==
- Heterormista fulvitaenia (Warren, 1903) New Guinea
- Heterormista modesta C. Swinhoe, 1901 Queensland, New Guinea
- Heterormista psammochroa (Lower, 1903) Queensland
