= Neogabara =

Scientific classification
- Domain: Eukaryota
- Kingdom: Animalia
- Phylum: Arthropoda
- Class: Insecta
- Order: Lepidoptera
- Superfamily: Noctuoidea
- Family: Erebidae
- Subfamily: Calpinae
- Genus: Neogabara; Wileman & West, 1929
- Species: N. plagiola

Binomial name
- Neogabara plagiola Wileman & West, 1929

Genus of moths

Neogabara is a monotypic moth genus of the family Erebidae. Its only species, Neogabara plagiola, is found on Mindanao in the Philippines and in Australia and Fiji. Both the genus and the species were first described by Wileman and West in 1929.
