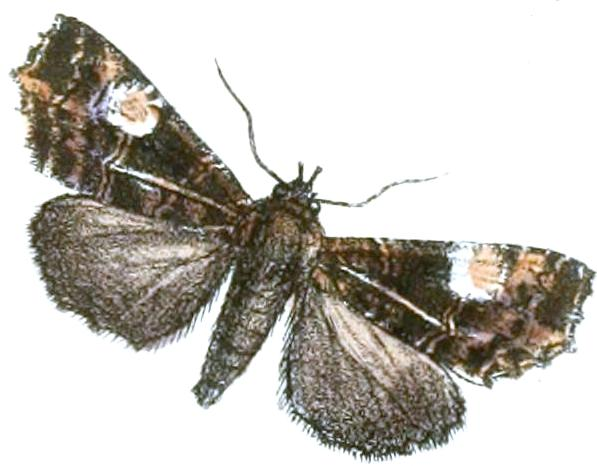

Scientific classification
- Kingdom: Animalia
- Phylum: Arthropoda
- Class: Insecta
- Order: Lepidoptera
- Superfamily: Noctuoidea
- Family: Erebidae
- Genus: Lineopalpa
- Species: L. horsfieldi

Binomial name
- Lineopalpa horsfieldi Guenée, 1852

Synonyms
- Briarda varians Moore, 1867

= Lineopalpa horsfieldi =

Species of moth

Lineopalpa horsfieldi is a species of moth of the family Erebidae first described by Achille Guenée in 1852. It is found in the Himalayas, Sumatra, Java, Borneo, Luzon, Sulawesi, Seram and New Guinea.

Adults are highly variable dark greenish brown with a forewing shape and fasciation that is typical for its family.

== Subspecies ==
- Lineopalpa horsfieldi horsfieldi (New Guinea)
- Lineopalpa horsfieldi chlora Prout, 1922 (Himalayas, Sumatra, Java, Borneo, Luzon, Sulawesi, Seram)
