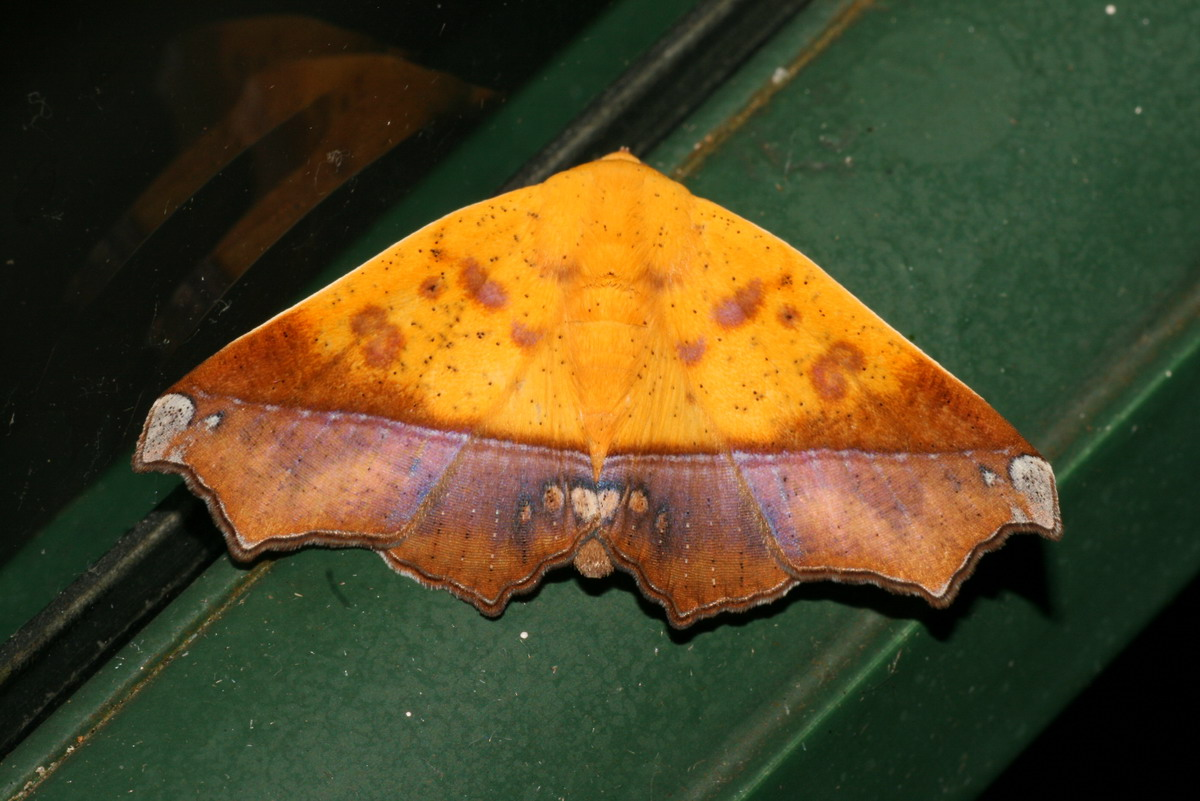
- Xanthanomis xanthina

Scientific classification
- Kingdom: Animalia
- Phylum: Arthropoda
- Class: Insecta
- Order: Lepidoptera
- Superfamily: Noctuoidea
- Family: Erebidae
- Subfamily: Calpinae
- Genus: Xanthanomis; Hampson, 1926

= Xanthanomis =

Genus of moths

Xanthanomis is a genus of moths of the family Erebidae. The genus was erected by George Hampson in 1926.

== Species ==
- Xanthanomis aurantiaca Hampson, 1926 New Guinea
- Xanthanomis eurogramma Hampson, 1926 New Guinea
- Xanthanomis fuscifrons (Walker, [1863]) northern Australia, Sarawak
- Xanthanomis lilacea (Bethune-Baker, 1906) New Guinea
- Xanthanomis vomeroi (Holloway & Zilli, 2005) Sarawak
- Xanthanomis xanthina (Holloway & Zilli, 2005) Borneo
