= Cola (moth) =

Scientific classification
- Kingdom: Animalia
- Phylum: Arthropoda
- Clade: Pancrustacea
- Class: Insecta
- Order: Lepidoptera
- Superfamily: Noctuoidea
- Family: Erebidae
- Subfamily: Calpinae
- Genus: Cola; Dyar, 1914

Genus of moths

Cola is a genus of moths of the family Erebidae. The genus was erected by Harrison Gray Dyar Jr. in 1914.

== Species ==
- Cola nabis Dyar, 1914
- Cola nagadeboides Strand, 1919
