= Brachyona =

Scientific classification
- Kingdom: Animalia
- Phylum: Arthropoda
- Class: Insecta
- Order: Lepidoptera
- Superfamily: Noctuoidea
- Family: Erebidae
- Subfamily: Calpinae
- Genus: Brachyona; Hampson, 1926
- Species: B. xylodesma

Binomial name
- Brachyona xylodesma Hampson, 1926

Genus of moths

Brachyona is a monotypic moth genus of the family Erebidae. Its only species, Brachyona xylodesma, is known from the Australian state of Western Australia and the Northern Territory. Both the genus and the species were first described by George Hampson in 1926.
