= Hirsutopalpis =

Scientific classification
- Domain: Eukaryota
- Kingdom: Animalia
- Phylum: Arthropoda
- Class: Insecta
- Order: Lepidoptera
- Superfamily: Noctuoidea
- Family: Erebidae
- Subfamily: Calpinae
- Genus: Hirsutopalpis; Bethune-Baker, 1904
- Species: H. fasciata

Binomial name
- Hirsutopalpis fasciata Bethune-Baker, 1904

Genus of moths

Hirsutopalpis is a monotypic moth genus of the family Erebidae. Its only species, Hirsutopalpis fasciata, is found in New Guinea. Both the genus and the species were first described by George Thomas Bethune-Baker in 1904.
