= Stenoprora =

Scientific classification
- Kingdom: Animalia
- Phylum: Arthropoda
- Class: Insecta
- Order: Lepidoptera
- Superfamily: Noctuoidea
- Family: Erebidae
- Subfamily: Calpinae
- Genus: Stenoprora; Hampson, 1926

Synonyms
- Eremnophanes Turner, 1944

Genus of moths

Stenoprora is a genus of moths of the family Erebidae. The genus was erected by George Hampson in 1926.

== Species ==
- Stenoprora adelopis (Lower, 1903) New South Wales
- Stenoprora apicinota (Turner, 1944) Queensland
- Stenoprora eurycycla Turner, 1936 Queensland
- Stenoprora lophota (Lower, 1903) Western Australia
- Stenoprora perspicua (Turner, 1941) Queensland
- Stenoprora triplax Turner, 1944 Queensland
