= Brachycyttara =

Scientific classification
- Domain: Eukaryota
- Kingdom: Animalia
- Phylum: Arthropoda
- Class: Insecta
- Order: Lepidoptera
- Superfamily: Noctuoidea
- Family: Erebidae
- Subfamily: Calpinae
- Genus: Brachycyttara; Turner, 1933
- Species: B. crypsipyrrha

Binomial name
- Brachycyttara crypsipyrrha Turner, 1933

Genus of moths

Brachycyttara is a monotypic moth genus of the family Noctuidae. Its only species, Brachycyttara crypsipyrrha, the cryptiv crest, is found in the Australian states of New South Wales, Victoria and Western Australia. Both the genus and the species were first described by Turner in 1833.
