= Synalissa tempaca =

Scientific classification
- Kingdom: Animalia
- Phylum: Arthropoda
- Clade: Pancrustacea
- Class: Insecta
- Order: Lepidoptera
- Superfamily: Noctuoidea
- Family: Erebidae
- Subfamily: Calpinae
- Genus: Synalissa; Möschler, 1880
- Species: S. tempaca

Binomial name
- Synalissa tempaca Möschler, 1880

Genus and species of moth

Synalissa tempaca is the only species in the monotypic moth genus Synalissa of the family Erebidae. It is found in Suriname. Both the genus and species were first described by Heinrich Benno Möschler in 1880.
