= Selenoperas =

Scientific classification
- Kingdom: Animalia
- Phylum: Arthropoda
- Class: Insecta
- Order: Lepidoptera
- Superfamily: Noctuoidea
- Family: Noctuidae (?)
- Subfamily: Catocalinae
- Genus: Selenoperas; Hampson, 1926
- Species: S. caustiplaga

Binomial name
- Selenoperas caustiplaga (Hampson, 1896)

Synonyms
- Capnodes caustiplaga Hampson, 1896; Oruza fulviplaga Warren, 1913

Genus of moths

Selenoperas is a monotypic moth genus of the family Noctuidae. Its only species, Selenoperas caustiplaga, is found in Bhutan. Both the genus and species were first described by George Hampson, the genus in 1926 and the species in 1896.
