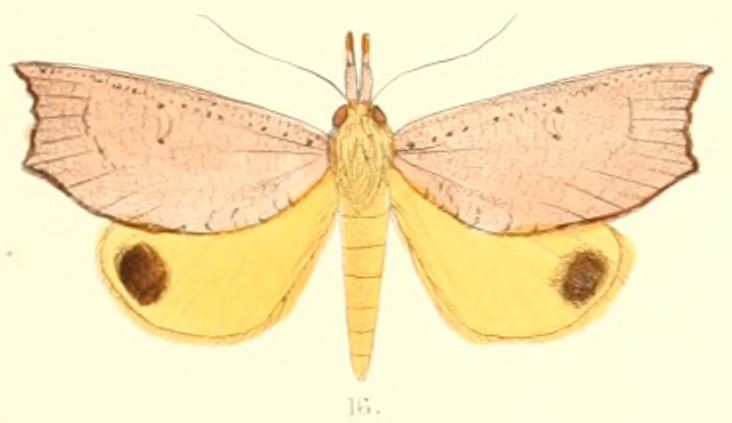

Scientific classification
- Domain: Eukaryota
- Kingdom: Animalia
- Phylum: Arthropoda
- Class: Insecta
- Order: Lepidoptera
- Superfamily: Noctuoidea
- Family: Erebidae
- Genus: Corcobara; Moore, 1882
- Species: C. angulipennis

Binomial name
- Corcobara angulipennis Moore, 1882

Synonyms
- Corcobara thwaitesi Moore, [1885]

= Corcobara =

Genus of moths

Corcobara is a monotypic moth genus of the family Erebidae first described by Frederic Moore in 1882. Its only species, Corcobara angulipennis, described by the same author in the same year, is found in India, Thailand, Cambodia, Myanmar, Malaysia, Indonesia, New Guinea, Sri Lanka and the Solomons.

== Description ==
Palpi porrect (extending forward), where the second and third joints very long and thickly hairy on both sides. A sharp frontal tuft present. Thorax and abdomen smoothly scaled. Tibia moderately hairy. Forewings with depressed and acute apex. Outer margin angled at vein 4. The inner margin highly arched, and forming a continuous curve with the outer margin as far as the angle. Veins 8 and 9 anastomosing (fusing) to form the areole. Hindwings with slightly excised costa. Vein 5 from the lower angle of cell.

The wingspan of the male is 42 mm and the female is 50 mm. In the male the head and thorax are dark reddish brown. Abdomen orange with black extremity. Forewings glossy reddish brown with many black stria. There are two specks found at end of cell. Hindwings orange with a large fuscous black spot near apex. Ventral side orange. Forewings with dark specks on costa and outer margin. A dark submarginal band. Hindwings with dark specks on the costa and a spot near the apex. Some specimens have the basal inner area of forewing speckled with yellow and a medial ill-defined yellow band from cell to inner margin. Female much similar to male, but with very much paler forewings.

Larva with rudimentary first two proleg pairs. There is a conical dorsal hump on the 11th somite. Body greyish brown dorsally and purple in ventral. Lateral sides are greyish with a longitudinal brown line. Spiracles black. Head ochreous with a black spot in front.
