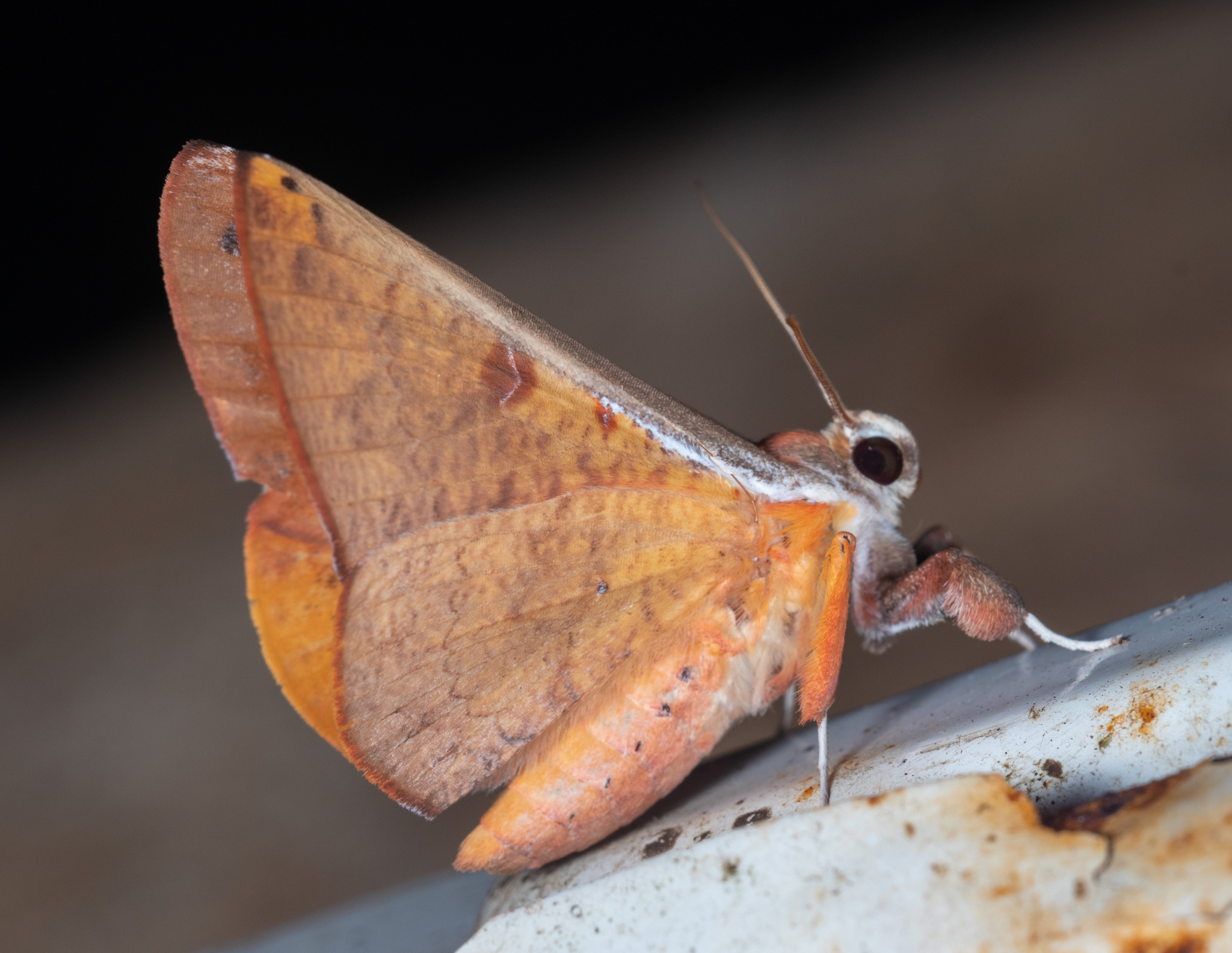
- Bematha extensa from Sumatra

Scientific classification
- Kingdom: Animalia
- Phylum: Arthropoda
- Class: Insecta
- Order: Lepidoptera
- Superfamily: Noctuoidea
- Family: Erebidae
- Genus: Bematha; Walker, 1865
- Species: B. extensa

Binomial name
- Bematha extensa Walker, 1865

= Bematha =

Genus of moths

Bematha is a monotypic genus of moths of the family Erebidae. The genus was erected by Francis Walker in 1865. The sole species is Bematha extensa.

Bematha extensa occurs in the Himalayas, Southeast Asia, and New Guinea.
