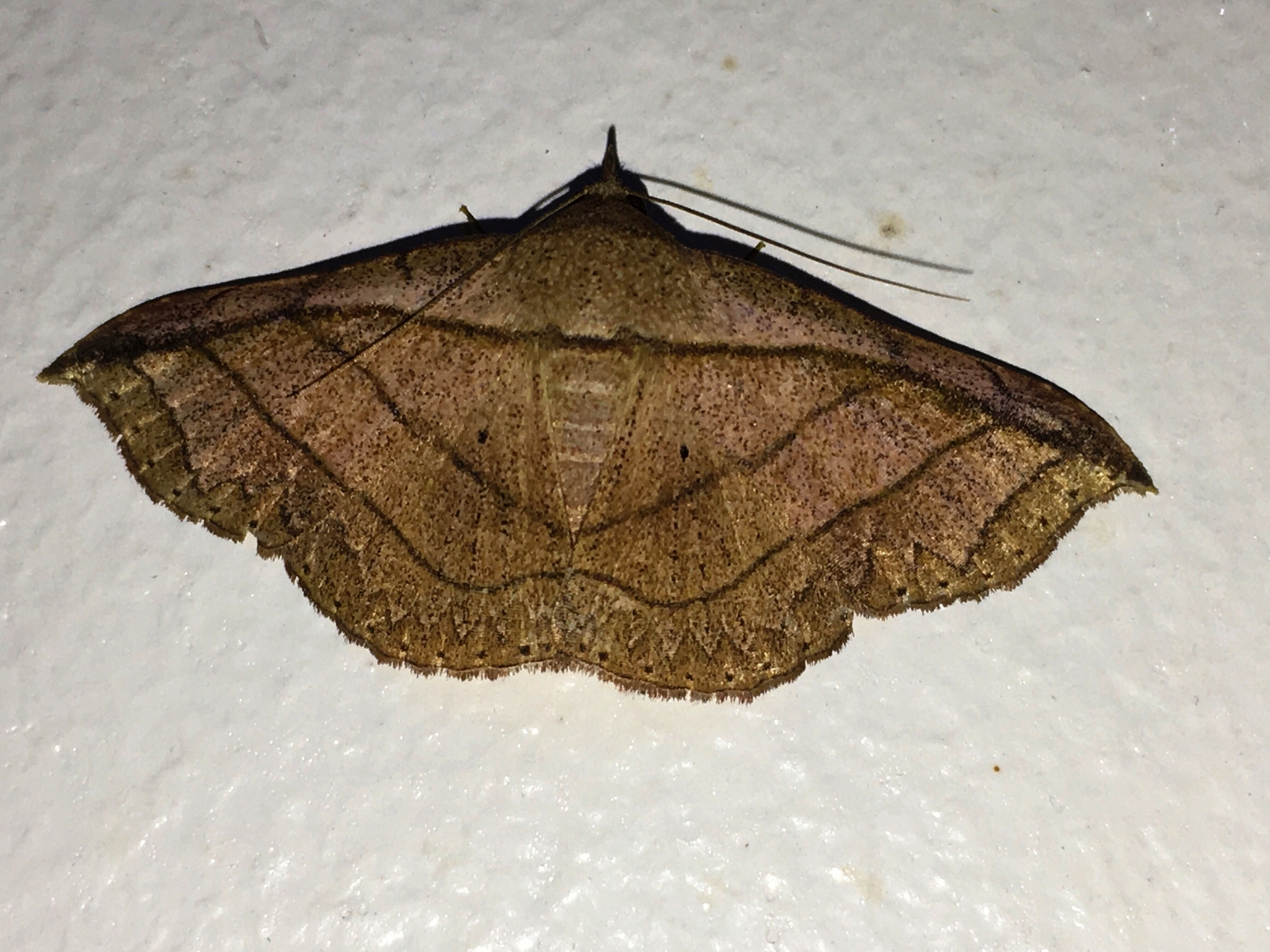
- Tiruvaca subcostalis

Scientific classification
- Domain: Eukaryota
- Kingdom: Animalia
- Phylum: Arthropoda
- Class: Insecta
- Order: Lepidoptera
- Superfamily: Noctuoidea
- Family: Erebidae
- Genus: Tiruvaca
- Species: Tiruvaca

Binomial name
- Tiruvaca C. Swinhoe, 1901

= Tiruvaca =

Genus of moths

Tiruvaca is a genus of moths in the family Erebidae. The genus was erected by Charles Swinhoe in 1901.

== Species ==
- Tiruvaca hollowayi Kobes, 1988
- Tiruvaca subcostalis Walker, 1865
