= Graphigona =

Scientific classification
- Kingdom: Animalia
- Phylum: Arthropoda
- Clade: Pancrustacea
- Class: Insecta
- Order: Lepidoptera
- Superfamily: Noctuoidea
- Family: Erebidae
- Genus: Graphigona; Walker, 1857
- Species: G. regina

Binomial name
- Graphigona regina Guenée in Boisduval and Guenée, 1852

Genus of moths

Graphigona is a monotypic moth genus in the family Erebidae erected by Francis Walker in 1857. Its only species, Graphigona regina, was first described by Achille Guenée in 1852. It is found in Colombia and Brazil.
