= Armana =

Scientific classification
- Domain: Eukaryota
- Kingdom: Animalia
- Phylum: Arthropoda
- Class: Insecta
- Order: Lepidoptera
- Superfamily: Noctuoidea
- Family: Noctuidae (?)
- Subfamily: Catocalinae
- Genus: Armana; Swinhoe, 1890
- Species: A. nigraericta

Binomial name
- Armana nigraericta Swinhoe, 1890

Genus of moths

Armana is a genus of moths of the family Noctuidae. Its only species, Armana nigraericta, is found in Myanmar. Both the genus and the species were first described by Swinhoe in 1890.
