= Dyops =

Scientific classification
- Kingdom: Animalia
- Phylum: Arthropoda
- Class: Insecta
- Order: Lepidoptera
- Superfamily: Noctuoidea
- Family: Noctuidae
- Genus: Dyops; Guenée in Boisduval & Guenée, 1852

Synonyms
- Arvaduca Walker, 1869

Genus of moths

Dyops is a genus of moths of the family Noctuidae. The genus was erected by Achille Guenée in 1852.

== Species ==
- Dyops chlorargyra Hampson, 1926 Venezuela
- Dyops chromatophila (Walker, 1858) French Guiana
- Dyops cuprescens Hampson, 1926 Peru
- Dyops ditrapezium (Sepp, [1840]) Suriname
- Dyops dotata (Walker, 1869) Honduras
- Dyops oculigera Guenée, 1852 French Guiana
- Dyops paurargyra Hampson, 1926 Brazil (Amazonas)
- Dyops pupillata Felder & Rogenhofer, 1874 Suriname
- Dyops schausii Dognin, 1894 Ecuador
- Dyops subdifferens Schaus, 1911 Costa Rica
- Dyops telharsa Schaus, 1911 Costa Rica
