= Zaleops =

Scientific classification
- Kingdom: Animalia
- Phylum: Arthropoda
- Class: Insecta
- Order: Lepidoptera
- Superfamily: Noctuoidea
- Family: Erebidae
- Genus: Zaleops; Hampson, 1926
- Species: Z. umbrina

Binomial name
- Zaleops umbrina (Grote, 1883)

Synonyms
- Zaleops paressa J. B. Smith, 1906; Pheocyma [sic] umbrina Grote, 1883; Campometra protea Smith, 1906; Campometra paresa Smith, 1906; Zaleops paresa (Smith, 1906)

Genus of moths

Zaleops is a monotypic moth genus in the family Erebidae erected by George Hampson in 1926. Its only species, Zaleops umbrina, was first described by Augustus Radcliffe Grote in 1883. It is found in the US state of Arizona.

The MONA or Hodges number for Zaleops umbrina is 8677.
