= Diascia (moth) =

Scientific classification
- Domain: Eukaryota
- Kingdom: Animalia
- Phylum: Arthropoda
- Class: Insecta
- Order: Lepidoptera
- Superfamily: Noctuoidea
- Family: Erebidae
- Subfamily: Calpinae
- Genus: Diascia

Species
- see text

Genus of moths

Diascia is a genus of moths of the family Noctuidae.

== Species ==
- Diascia hayesi Holloway 1976
- Diascia nubilata Hampson 1909
- Diascia transvitta Moore 1887
