= Neostichtis =

Scientific classification
- Domain: Eukaryota
- Kingdom: Animalia
- Phylum: Arthropoda
- Class: Insecta
- Order: Lepidoptera
- Superfamily: Noctuoidea
- Family: Noctuidae
- Subfamily: Amphipyrinae
- Genus: Neostichtis; Janse, 1937

Type species
- Parastichtis nigricostata Hampson, 1908

Genus of moths

Neostichtis is a genus of moths of the family Noctuidae. The genus was erected by Anthonie Johannes Theodorus Janse in 1937.

== Species ==
- Neostichtis altitudinis Laporte, 1972 Cameroon
- Neostichtis fulgurata Carcasson, 1965 Tanzania
- Neostichtis ignorata Viette, 1957 Madagascar
- Neostichtis inopinatus Viette, 1959 Madagascar
- Neostichtis nigricostata (Hampson, 1908) Sierra Leone, Mauritius
- Neostichtis teruworkae Laporte, 1984 Ethiopia
