= Bendisodes =

Scientific classification
- Kingdom: Animalia
- Phylum: Arthropoda
- Class: Insecta
- Order: Lepidoptera
- Superfamily: Noctuoidea
- Family: Erebidae
- Genus: Bendisodes; Hampson, 1924
- Species: B. aeolia

Binomial name
- Bendisodes aeolia (Druce, 1890)

Genus of moths

Bendisodes is a monotypic moth genus in the family Erebidae erected by George Hampson in 1924. Its only species, Bendisodes aeolia, was described by Druce in 1890. It is found in North America.

The MONA or Hodges number for Bendisodes aeolia is 8656.
