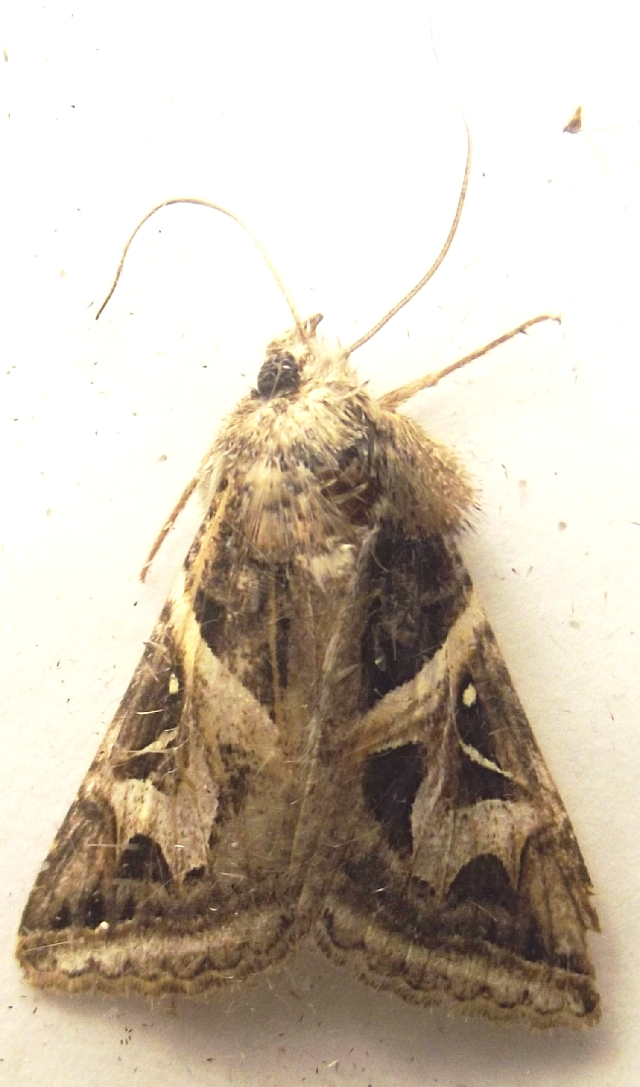

Scientific classification
- Kingdom: Animalia
- Phylum: Arthropoda
- Class: Insecta
- Order: Lepidoptera
- Superfamily: Noctuoidea
- Family: Erebidae
- Genus: Ianius; Richards, 1939
- Species: I. mosca

Binomial name
- Ianius mosca (Dyar, 1910)

Synonyms
- Melipotis mosca Dyar, 1910

= Ianius =

Genus of moths

Ianius is a monotypic moth genus in the family Erebidae described by Richards in 1939. Its only species, Ianius mosca, was first described by Harrison Gray Dyar Jr. in 1910. It is found in Mexico and the southern United States, where it has been recorded from Texas.

The wingspan is about 30 mm. Adults are on wing from March to May and in September.
