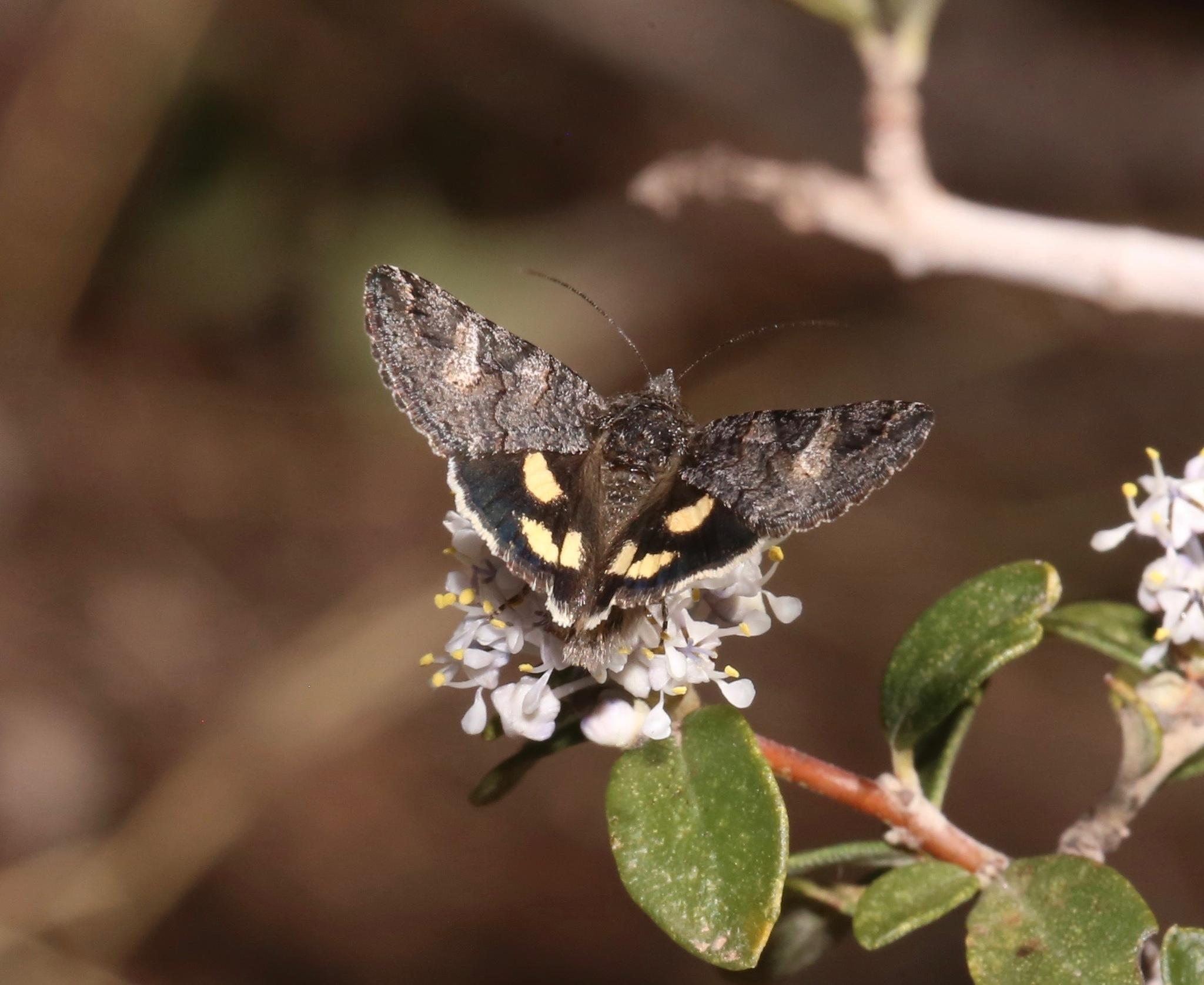
- Litocala sexsignata, Arizona

Scientific classification
- Domain: Eukaryota
- Kingdom: Animalia
- Phylum: Arthropoda
- Class: Insecta
- Order: Lepidoptera
- Superfamily: Noctuoidea
- Family: Erebidae
- Genus: Litocala; Harvey, 1878
- Species: L. sexsignata

Binomial name
- Litocala sexsignata (Harvey, 1875)

Synonyms
- Generic: Lita Harvey, 1875 (preocc. Treitschke, 1833); Specific: Lita sexsignata Harvey, 1875

= Litocala =

Genus of moths

Litocala is a monotypic moth genus in the family Erebidae. Its only species, Litocala sexsignata, the litocala moth, is found in the United States in Washington, Montana, Utah and Colorado south to southern California and northern Baja California in Mexico. Both the genus and species were first described by Leon F. Harvey, the genus in 1878 and the species three years earlier. The habitat consists of oak woodlands and forests.

The length of the forewings is 13–15 mm. Adults are on wing from March to June. They have been recorded sipping moisture at puddles and has also been found nectaring at willow catkins.

== Subspecies ==
- Litocala sexsignata sexsignata
- Litocala sexsignata deserta Edwards, 1881
