= List of noctuid genera: B =

The huge moth family Noctuidae contains the following genera:

A B C D E F G H I J K L M N O P Q R S T U V W X Y Z

- Badausa
- Badiza
- Baecula
- Bagada
- Bagisara
- Ballonicha
- Balsa
- Bambusiphila
- Bamra
- Banassa
- Bandelia
- Baniana
- Baniopis
- Baorisa
- Baptarma
- Baputa
- Barastrotia
- Baratha
- Barbesola
- Barcita
- Bareia
- Bariana
- Barrovia
- Barybela
- Basilica
- Basilodes
- Bastilla
- Bathystolma
- Bathytricha
- Batina
- Batracharta
- Batuana
- Batyma
- Bavilia
- Baxagha
- Beckeugenia
- Behounekia
- Behrensia
- Beihania
- Belciades
- Belciana
- Bellura
- Belosticta
- Bematha
- Bendis
- Bendisodes
- Bendisopis
- Benjaminiola
- Beregra
- Berioana
- Beriohansa
- Beriotisia
- Berocynta
- Berresa
- Berrhaea
- Bertula
- Bertulania
- Bessacta
- Bessula
- Betusa
- Biagicola
- Biangulypena
- Biareolifera
- Bibacta
- Bicondica
- Bifrontipta
- Bihymena
- Biregula
- Birtha
- Bischoffia
- Bistica
- Bithiasa
- Bithiga
- Bityla
- Blancharditia
- Blanona
- Blasticorhinus
- Blemmatia
- Blepharamia
- Blepharita
- Blepharoa
- Blepharomima
- Blepharonia
- Blepharosis
- Bleptina
- Bleptinodes
- Bleptiphora
- Blosyris
- Boalda
- Bocana
- Bocula
- Boethanthia
- Bolica
- Bombotelia
- Bombiciella
- Bomolocha
- Bompolia
- Bonaberiana
- Bononia
- Borbotana
- Bornolis
- Borolia
- Borsania
- Borsippa
- Boryza
- Boryzola
- Boryzops
- Bostrodes
- Bostrycharia
- Bouda
- Boursinania
- Boursinia
- Boursinidia
- Bousinixis
- Bracharthron
- Brachionycha
- Brachycosmia
- Brachycyttara
- Brachygalea
- Brachyherca
- Brachylomia
- Brachyona
- Brachypteragrotis
- Brachytegma
- Brachyxanthia
- Bradunia
- Brana
- Brandtaxia
- Brandticola
- Brephos
- Brevipecten
- Briarda
- Britha
- Brithodes
- Brithys
- Brithysana
- Brontypena
- Brotis
- Brunnarsia
- Bryocodia
- Bryogramma
- Bryograpta
- Bryoleuca
- Bryolymnia
- Bryomima
- Bryomixis
- Bryomoia
- Bryonola
- Bryonycta
- Bryophila
- Bryophilina
- Bryopolia
- Bryopsis
- Bryotype
- Bryotypella
- Bryoxena
- Buciara
- Bucinna
- Bulia
- Bulna
- Buphana
- Burdettia
- Burdria
- Burgena
- Busmadis
- Busseola
- Butleronea
- Buzara
- Byturna
