= List of noctuid genera: V =

The huge moth family Noctuidae contains the following genera:

A B C D E F G H I J K L M N O P Q R S T U V W X Y Z

- Valeria
- Valerietta
- Valeriodes
- Vallagyris
- Vandana
- Vapara
- Varia
- Varicosia
- Varina
- Veia
- Velazconia
- Vescisa
- Vespola
- Vestura
- Via
- Victrix
- Vietteania
- Viettentia
- Villosa
- Viminia
- Violaphotia
- Virgo
- Viridemas
- Vittappressa
- Vogia
- Volazaha
- Vulcanica
