= List of noctuid genera: K =

The huge moth family Noctuidae contains the following genera:

A B C D E F G H I J K L M N O P Q R S T U V W X Y Z

- Kakopoda
- Kallitrichia
- Kalmina
- Karana
- Kenguichardia
- Kenrickodes
- Khadira
- Klappericola
- Klugeana
- Knappia
- Kobestelia
- Kocakina
- Koehleramia
- Koffoleania
- Kohlera
- Kollariana
- Koptoplax
- Koraia
- Koyaga
- Krugia
- Kumasia
- Kuruschia
- Kyneria
