= List of noctuid genera: Q =

The huge moth family Noctuidae contains the following genera:

A B C D E F G H I J K L M N O P Q R S T U V W X Y Z

- Quadratala
- Quandara
- Quaramia
