= List of noctuid genera: Y =

The huge moth family Noctuidae contains the following genera:

A B C D E F G H I J K L M N O P Q R S T U V W X Y Z

- Yepcalphis
- Yerongponga
- Yidalpta
- Yigoga
- Ypsia
- Ypsora
- Yrias
- Yula
