= Bouda =

Bouda is a surname. Notable people with the surname include:

- Charikleia Bouda (born 1980), Greek sprinter
- Cyril Bouda (1901–1984), Czech painter, graphic artist and illustrator
- Ousseni Bouda (born 2000), Burkinabé professional footballer
- Romaric Bouda (born 1997), French judoka
- Seydou Bouda (born 1958), Burkinabé politician

== See also ==
- Bouda (moth), genus of moths
- Bouda, Algeria, commune in Adrar District, Adrar Province
- Buda (folklore)
