= Buciara bipartita =

Scientific classification
- Kingdom: Animalia
- Phylum: Arthropoda
- Class: Insecta
- Order: Lepidoptera
- Superfamily: Noctuoidea
- Family: Noctuidae
- Genus: Buciara
- Species: B. bipartita

Binomial name
- Buciara bipartita Walker, 1869

Synonyms
- Actinotia acmophora Meyrick, 1897

Species of moth

Buciara bipartita is a moth of the family Noctuidae. It is found in the Australian Capital Territory, New South Wales, South Australia and Victoria.

The larvae have been reared on Hibbertia exutiacies, Hibbertia sericea and Hibbertia stricta.
