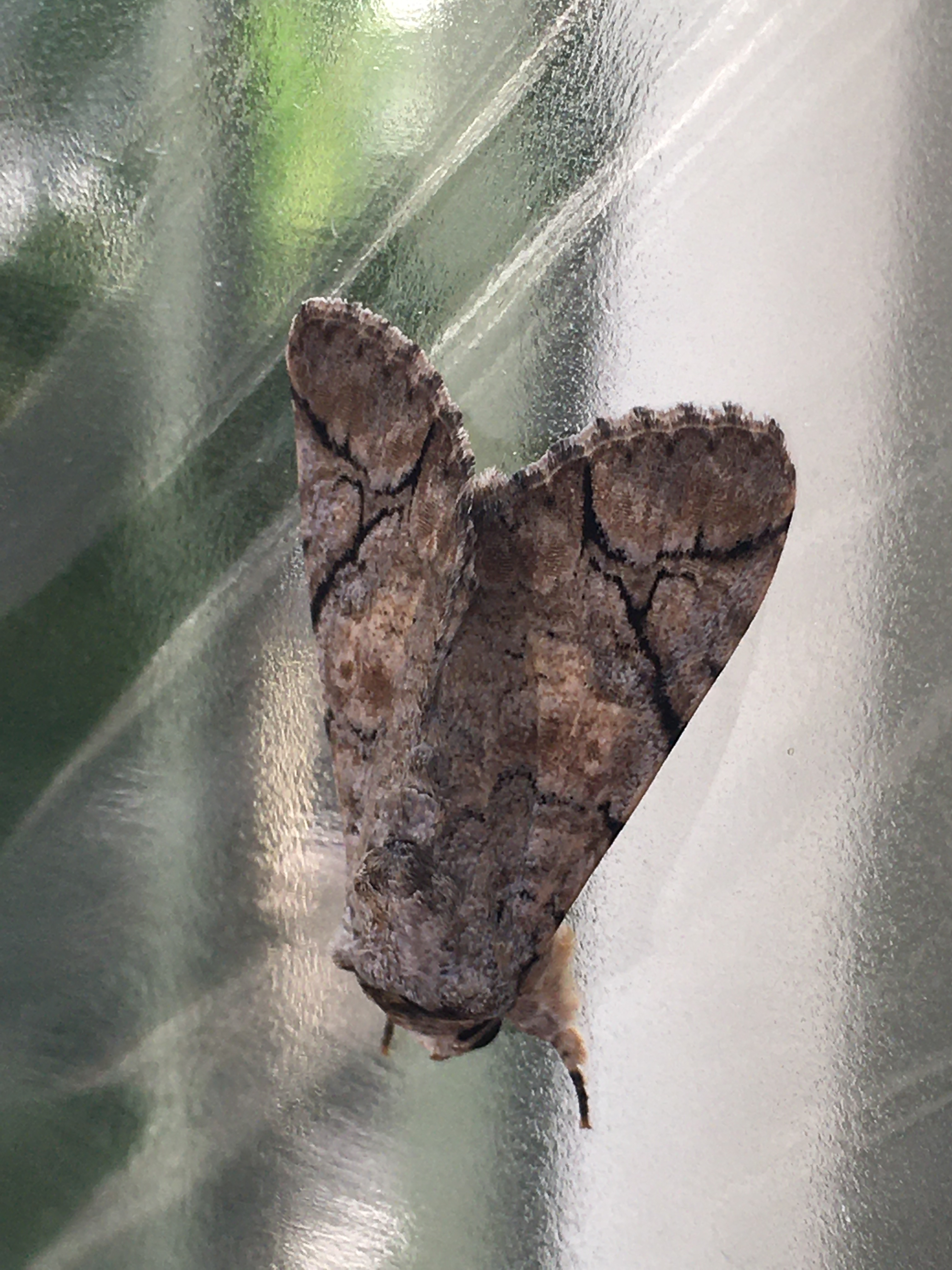

Scientific classification
- Kingdom: Animalia
- Phylum: Arthropoda
- Clade: Pancrustacea
- Class: Insecta
- Order: Lepidoptera
- Superfamily: Noctuoidea
- Family: Erebidae
- Genus: Bamra
- Species: B. mundata

Binomial name
- Bamra mundata Walker, 1858

Synonyms
- Bamra acronyctoides Moore 1882

= Bamra mundata =

Species of moth

Bamra mundata is a moth of the family Noctuidae first described by Francis Walker in 1858. It is found in India (Sikkim, Assam) and Sri Lanka, Caterpillars are known to feed on Albizia and Arachis hypogaea.

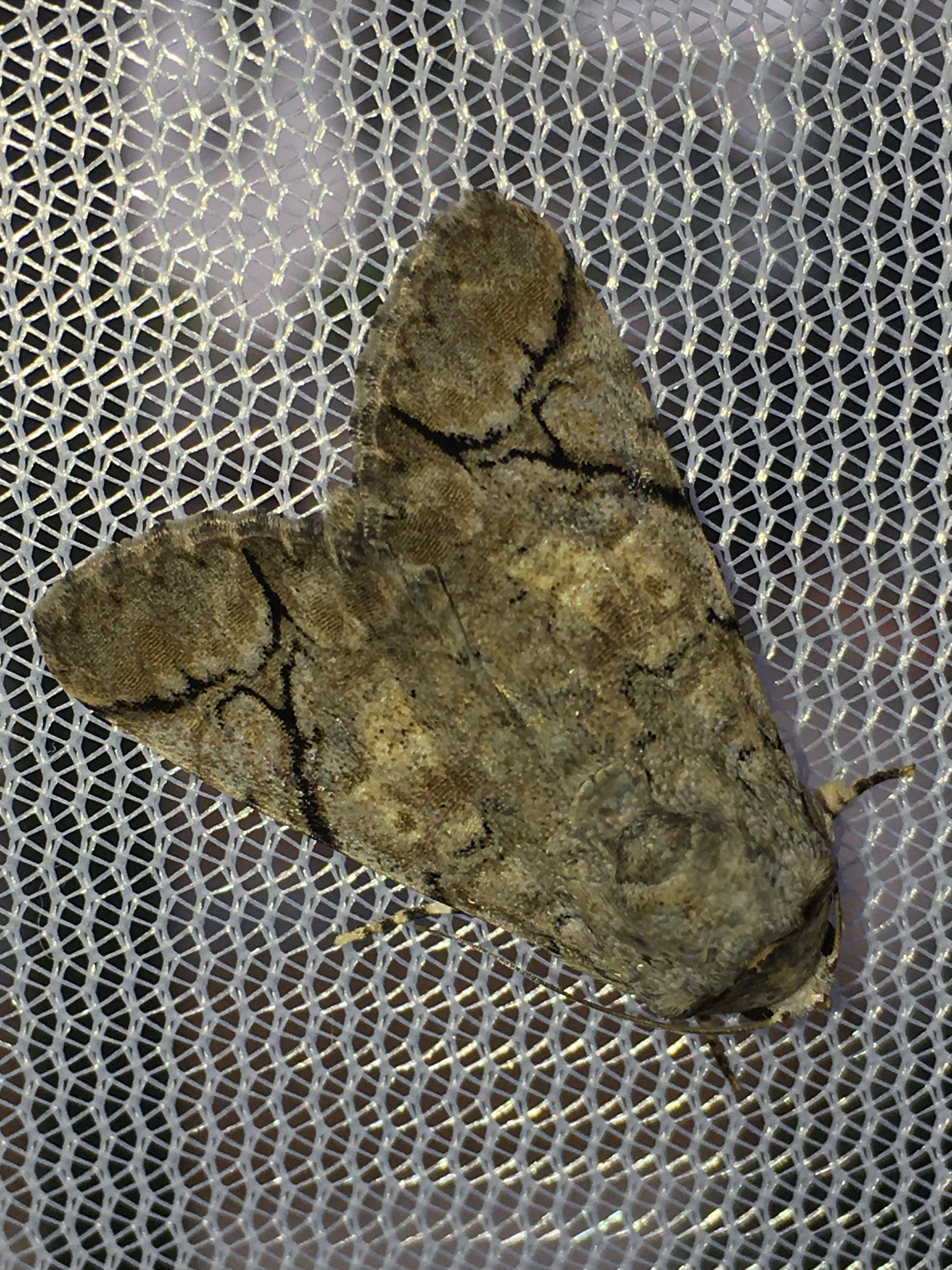
Bamra mundata
