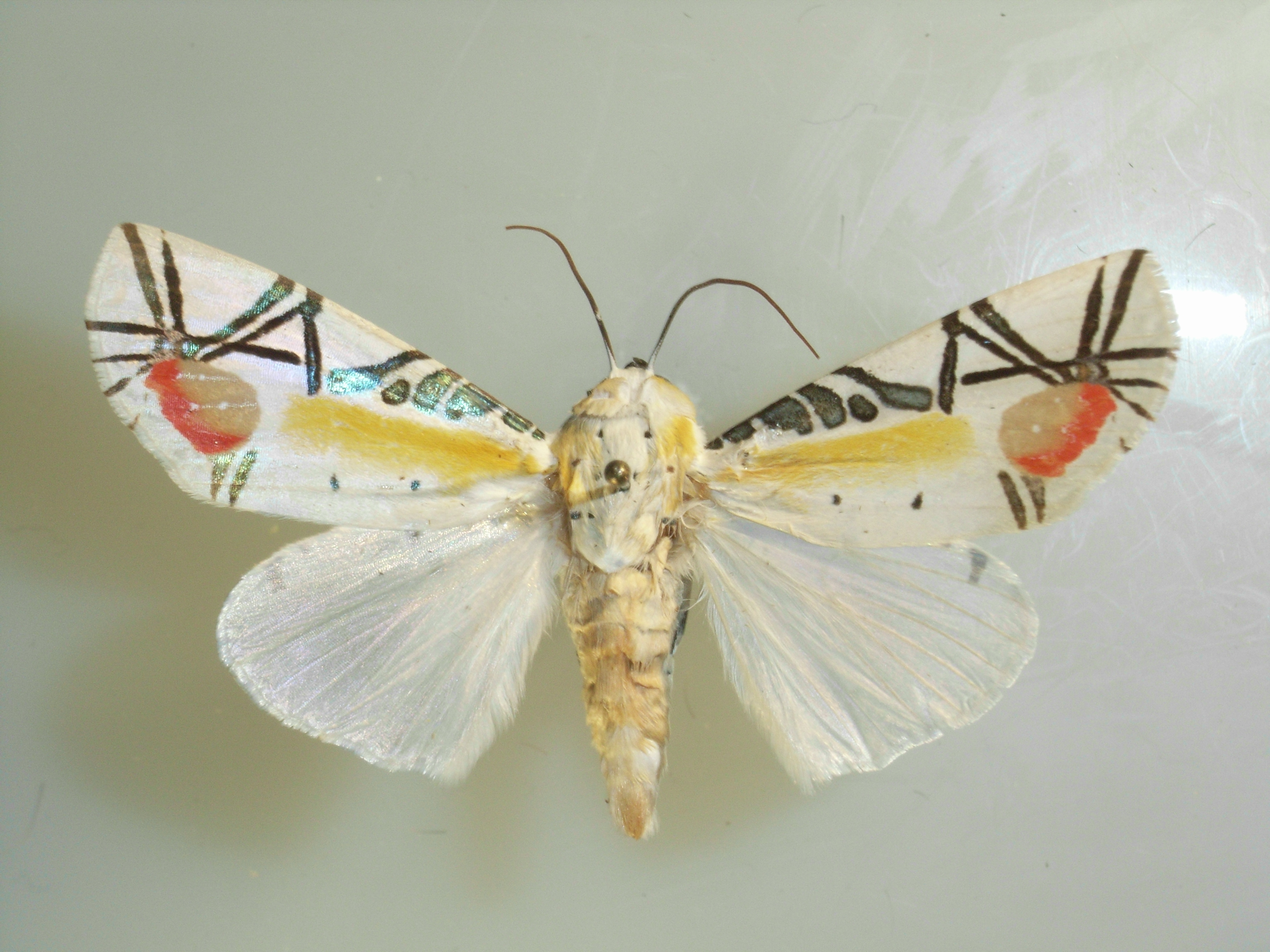

Scientific classification
- Kingdom: Animalia
- Phylum: Arthropoda
- Class: Insecta
- Order: Lepidoptera
- Superfamily: Noctuoidea
- Family: Erebidae
- Genus: Baorisa
- Species: B. hieroglyphica

Binomial name
- Baorisa hieroglyphica Moore, 1882

= Baorisa hieroglyphica =

Species of moth

Baorisa hieroglyphica, also known as the Picasso moth, is a species of moth in the family Erebidae. It was described by the British entomologist Frederic Moore in 1882. The genus Baorisa was long thought to be monotypic, but three other species have been described. It is found in parts of northeastern India and Southeast Asia.
