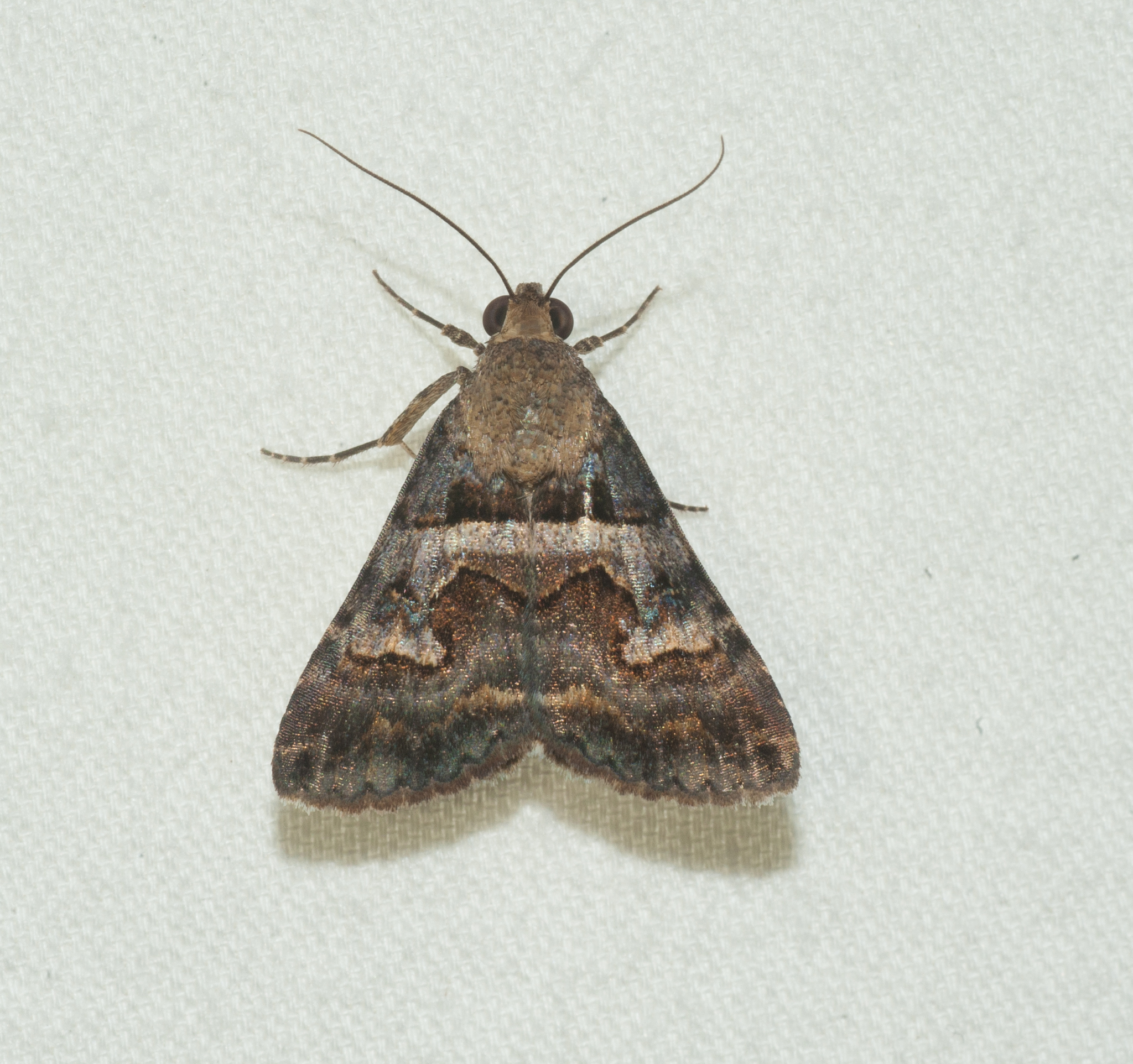

Scientific classification
- Kingdom: Animalia
- Phylum: Arthropoda
- Class: Insecta
- Order: Lepidoptera
- Superfamily: Noctuoidea
- Family: Erebidae
- Genus: Bulia
- Species: B. confirmans

Binomial name
- Bulia confirmans (Walker, 1858)

Synonyms
- Bolina confirmans Walker, 1858; Bolina umbrosa Walker, 1858; Biula propira Walker, 1858

= Bulia confirmans =

Species of moth

Bulia confirmans is a moth of the family Erebidae. It is found in Cuba, Jamaica, Haiti, the Dominican Republic, Puerto Rico, Grenada, northern Venezuela and Colombia.

The larvae feed on Jatropha gossypiifolia.
