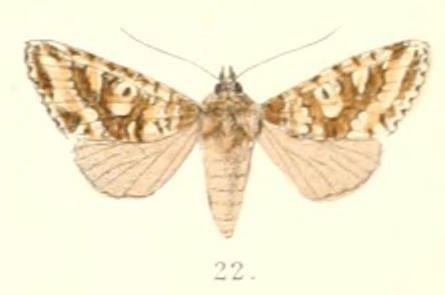

Scientific classification
- Domain: Eukaryota
- Kingdom: Animalia
- Phylum: Arthropoda
- Class: Insecta
- Order: Lepidoptera
- Superfamily: Noctuoidea
- Family: Noctuidae
- Genus: Bryotypella
- Species: B. leucosticta

Binomial name
- Bryotypella leucosticta (Moore, 1882)

Synonyms
- Dryobata leucosticta Moore, 1882

= Bryotypella leucosticta =

Species of moth

Bryotypella leucosticta is a moth of the family Noctuidae. It is found in India (Darjeeling).
