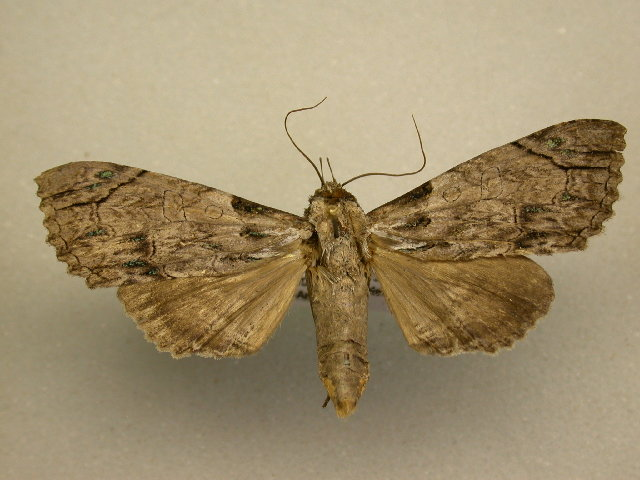

Scientific classification
- Domain: Eukaryota
- Kingdom: Animalia
- Phylum: Arthropoda
- Class: Insecta
- Order: Lepidoptera
- Superfamily: Noctuoidea
- Family: Erebidae
- Genus: Boryzops
- Species: B. similis

Binomial name
- Boryzops similis (H. H. Druce, 1901)

Synonyms
- Gadirtha similis H. H. Druce, 1901

= Boryzops similis =

Species of moth

Boryzops similis is a species of moth of the family Erebidae first described by Hamilton Herbert Druce in 1901. It is found in Costa Rica, Mexico, Venezuela and Brazil (Rondonia, Minas Gerais).
