= Bamra cazeti =

Scientific classification
- Domain: Eukaryota
- Kingdom: Animalia
- Phylum: Arthropoda
- Class: Insecta
- Order: Lepidoptera
- Superfamily: Noctuoidea
- Family: Erebidae
- Genus: Bamra
- Species: B. cazeti

Binomial name
- Bamra cazeti (Mabille, 1893)

Synonyms
- Cataphia cazeti Mabille, 1893; Acronycta madagascariensis (Oberthür, 1916)

Species of moth

Bamra cazeti is a moth of the family Erebidae. It is native to Madagascar.

The male of this species has a wingspan of 50 mm, the forewings are dark grey with two black lines. Hindwings are white, blackish shadowed at the border. The underside of the wings is all white, with the apical half of the forewings shadowed grey and a darker spot at the end of the cell. The body is of the same grey colour as the forewings, the abdomen clearer with the underside almost white.

Mabille dedicated this species to the vicar apostolic of Madagascar, Monseigneur Cazet.
