= Bulia brunnearis =

Scientific classification
- Kingdom: Animalia
- Phylum: Arthropoda
- Class: Insecta
- Order: Lepidoptera
- Superfamily: Noctuoidea
- Family: Erebidae
- Genus: Bulia
- Species: B. brunnearis

Binomial name
- Bulia brunnearis (Guenée, 1852)

Synonyms
- Bolina brunnearis Guenée, 1852; Arsisaca bolinalis Walker, 1866

Species of moth

Bulia brunnearis is a moth of the family Erebidae. It is found in Jamaica, Haiti and the Dominican Republic.
