= Boryzops purissima =

Scientific classification
- Domain: Eukaryota
- Kingdom: Animalia
- Phylum: Arthropoda
- Class: Insecta
- Order: Lepidoptera
- Superfamily: Noctuoidea
- Family: Erebidae
- Genus: Boryzops
- Species: B. purissima

Binomial name
- Boryzops purissima (Dyar, 1910)

Synonyms
- Iscadia purissima Dyar, 1910; Boryzops purissimus; Sebagena ciocolatinus Draudt 1939

Species of moth

Boryzops purissima is a species of moth of the family Erebidae. It is found in the southern United States, where it has been recorded from Florida and Texas, as well as in Veracruz in Mexico, Costa Rica and Jamaica.

The wingspan is about 68 mm. The forewings are white, with a black patch at the base on the costa, covering the inner line. There is a patch of yellow-green scales below it, as well as a black mark above the inner margin across the inner line with a smaller duplication above vein 1, marked with green scales within. The inner line is narrow, single, black and bent inward toward the base below vein 1. The median line is represented by two grey marks on the costa and there is an orbicular black dot. The reniform is brokenly outlined in black and the outer line is thick and oblique from the costa to vein 5, sending a bar to the outer margin. Beyond the line are a series of patches of green and yellow scales arranged upon a grey strongly waved line, which continues above the oblique black bar to the costa. There is a wavy brown shade in the terminal space and a terminal black line forming dentations of the veins. The hindwings are pale brown, but broadly blackish along the margin, the termen powdered with grey. A black line edged with white powdering stars from near the anal angle. Adults are on wing in January, from March to August and from October to December in Florida.
