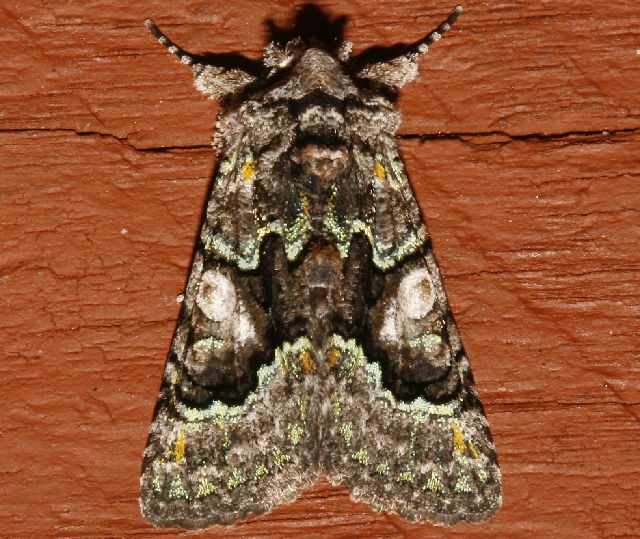

Scientific classification
- Kingdom: Animalia
- Phylum: Arthropoda
- Class: Insecta
- Order: Lepidoptera
- Superfamily: Noctuoidea
- Family: Noctuidae
- Genus: Behrensia
- Species: B. conchiformis

Binomial name
- Behrensia conchiformis Grote, 1875

= Behrensia conchiformis =

Species of moth

Behrensia conchiformis is a species of moth in the family Noctuidae (the owlet moths). It is found in North America.

The MONA or Hodges number for Behrensia conchiformis is 10178.

== Subspecies ==
These two subspecies belong to the species Behrensia conchiformis:

- Behrensia conchiformis conchiformis
- Behrensia conchiformis suffusa Buckett, 1964
