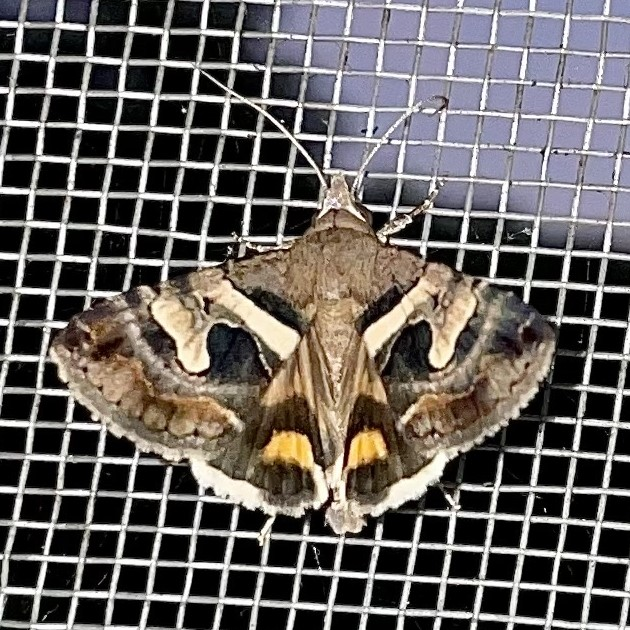

Scientific classification
- Kingdom: Animalia
- Phylum: Arthropoda
- Class: Insecta
- Order: Lepidoptera
- Superfamily: Noctuoidea
- Family: Erebidae
- Genus: Bulia
- Species: B. mexicana

Binomial name
- Bulia mexicana (Behr, 1870)

Synonyms
- Syneda mexicana Behr, 1870

= Bulia mexicana =

Species of moth

Bulia mexicana is a moth of the family Erebidae first described by Hans Hermann Behr in 1870. It is found from Chiapas in western Mexico south to north-western Costa Rica.

The larvae feed on Prosopis juliflora.
