= Bulia similaris =

Scientific classification
- Domain: Eukaryota
- Kingdom: Animalia
- Phylum: Arthropoda
- Class: Insecta
- Order: Lepidoptera
- Superfamily: Noctuoidea
- Family: Erebidae
- Genus: Bulia
- Species: B. similaris

Binomial name
- Bulia similaris Richards, 1936

Synonyms
- Bulia californica Richards, 1939; Bulia morelosa Richards, 1941

Species of moth

Bulia similaris is a species of moth of the family Erebidae. It is found from southern California south to Baja California, east to southern Arizona, northwestern Sonora, western Texas and eastern Mexico.

The wingspan is about 32 mm.
