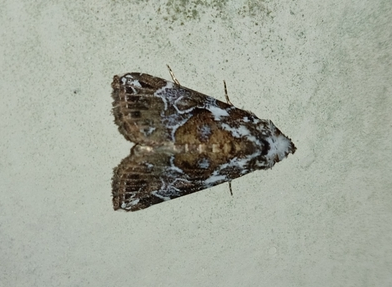
- Chorsia albiscripta

Scientific classification
- Kingdom: Animalia
- Phylum: Arthropoda
- Class: Insecta
- Order: Lepidoptera
- Superfamily: Noctuoidea
- Family: Erebidae
- Genus: Chorsia
- Species: C. albiscripta

Binomial name
- Chorsia albiscripta (Hampson, 1898)

= Chorsia albiscripta =

Species of moth

Chorsia albiscripta is a species of moth of the genus Chorsia and family Erebidae. This species is found on Sri Lanka, southern India, Japan, Borneo.
