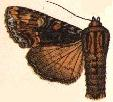

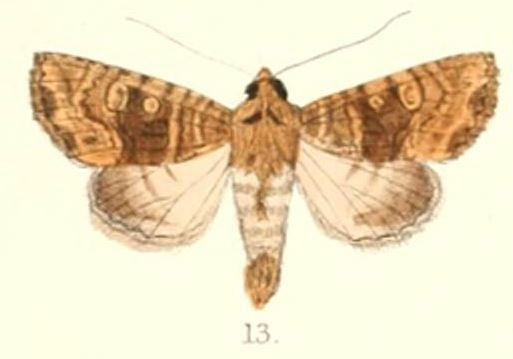

Scientific classification
- Domain: Eukaryota
- Kingdom: Animalia
- Phylum: Arthropoda
- Class: Insecta
- Order: Lepidoptera
- Superfamily: Noctuoidea
- Family: Noctuidae
- Genus: Blepharita
- Species: B. flavistigma

Binomial name
- Blepharita flavistigma (Moore, 1867)

Synonyms
- Xylophasia flavistigma Moore, 1867; Parastichtis flavistigma (Moore, 1867); Apamea basalis Moore, 1881; Apamea denticulosa Moore, 1882

= Blepharita flavistigma =

Species of moth

Blepharita flavistigma is a moth of the family Noctuidae. It is found in Bengal, Dalhousie and Darjeeling.
