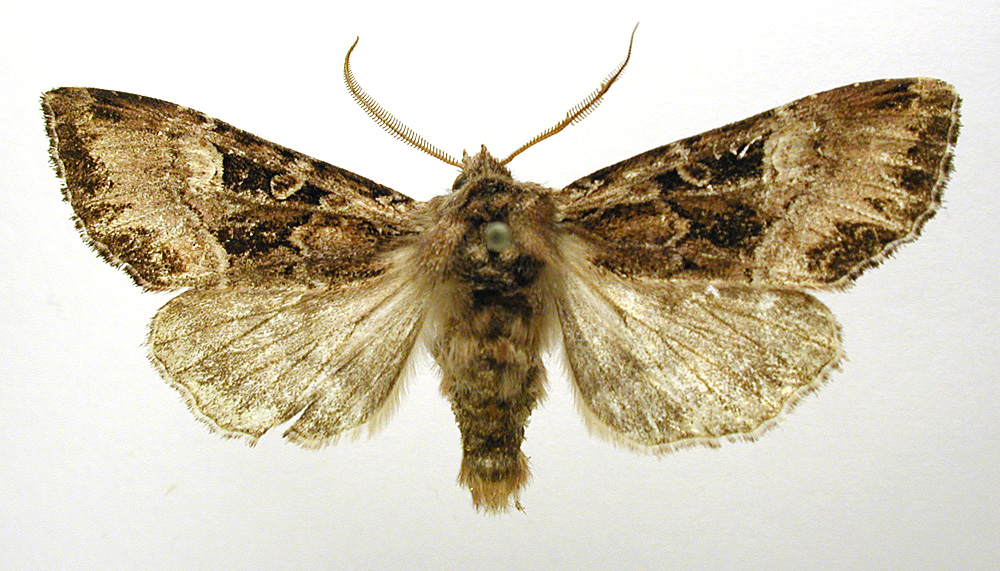

Scientific classification
- Domain: Eukaryota
- Kingdom: Animalia
- Phylum: Arthropoda
- Class: Insecta
- Order: Lepidoptera
- Superfamily: Noctuoidea
- Family: Noctuidae
- Genus: Blepharita
- Species: B. amica

Binomial name
- Blepharita amica (Treitschke, 1825)

Synonyms
- Hadena amica Treitschke, 1825; Blepharita amica ussuriensis Sheljuzhko, 1825

= Blepharita amica =

Species of moth

Blepharita amica is a moth of the family Noctuidae. It is found from northern Europe to the Russian plain, the Ural, Siberia (West Siberian Lowland and South Siberian Mountains), the Amur Oblast, Primorye Region and Kazakhstan. It has also been recorded from the Korean Peninsula, Japan (Hokkaido and Honshu) and north-eastern China.

The wingspan is 41–47 mm. Adults are on wing from the end of August to the beginning of October. Larvae have been recorded on Aconitum septentrionale, Heracleum sphondylium, Lactuca sativa, Pastinaca sativa, Taraxacum vulgare, Lupinus polyphyllus and Prunus padus.
