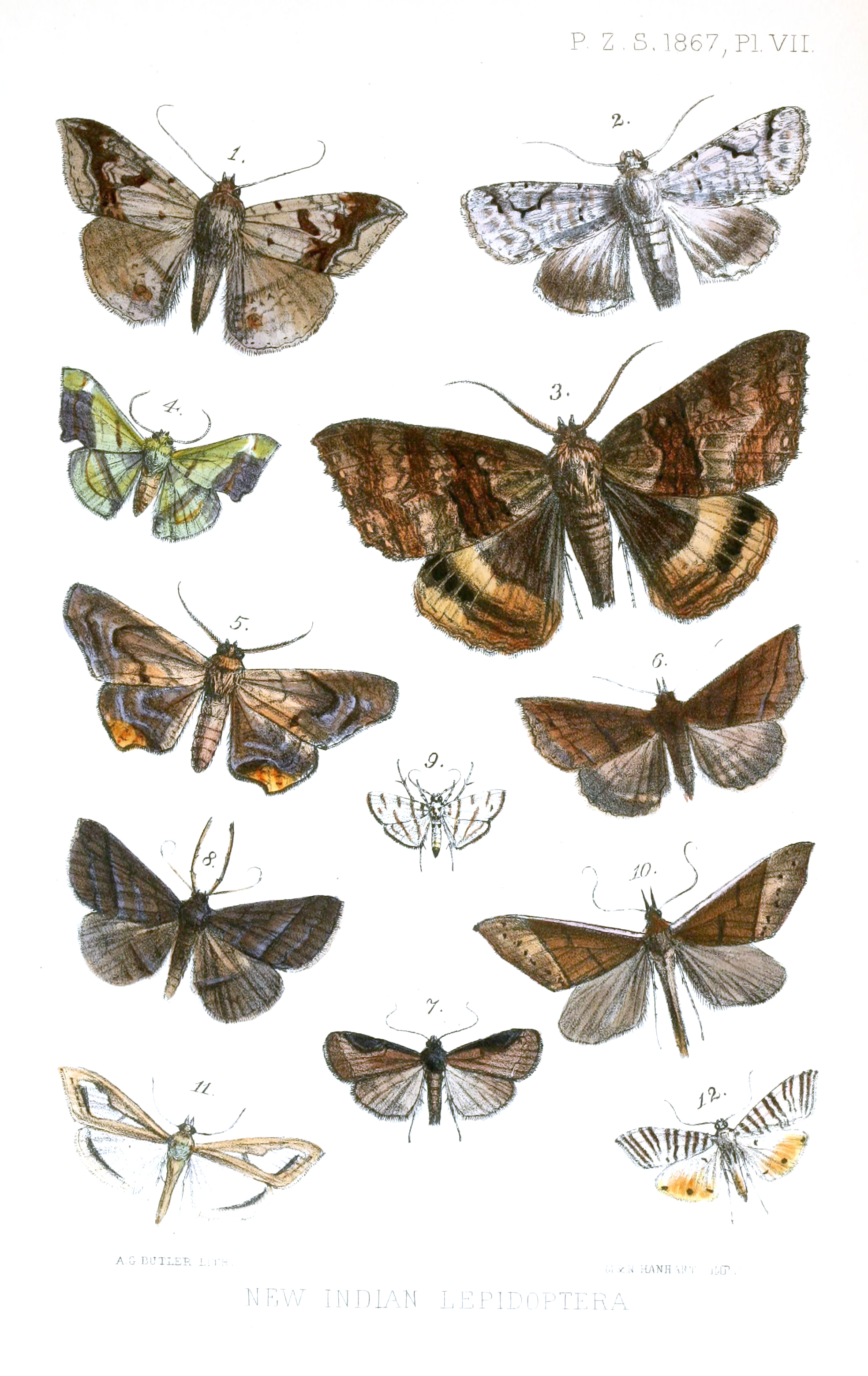
- Upper right hand side

Scientific classification
- Kingdom: Animalia
- Phylum: Arthropoda
- Clade: Pancrustacea
- Class: Insecta
- Order: Lepidoptera
- Superfamily: Noctuoidea
- Family: Erebidae
- Genus: Bamra
- Species: B. albicola

Binomial name
- Bamra albicola Walker, 1858

Synonyms
- Felinia albicola Walker, 1858; Agriopis discalis Moore, 1867; Bamra diplostigma Hampson, 1893; Polydesma discalis melli Draudt, 1950

= Bamra albicola =

Species of moth

Bamra albicola is a moth of the family Noctuidae first described by Francis Walker in 1858.

== Distribution ==
This species is found in Sri Lanka, India, Thailand, Vietnam, Peninsular Malaysia, Sumatra, Borneo, China, Taiwan, Japan and Sulawesi.

== Description ==
The species shows sexual dimorphism. In the female, the forewings are irregularly fasciated pale grey in color which is almost white in the male, with a distinctive darker zone on the costa. Hindwings are also darker in the female than in male.

== Subspecies ==
Two subspecies are recognized.

- Bamra albicola albicola
- Bamra albicola melli Draudt, 1950 - Taiwan
