= Lepidodes =

Scientific classification
- Kingdom: Animalia
- Phylum: Arthropoda
- Class: Insecta
- Order: Lepidoptera
- Superfamily: Noctuoidea
- Family: Erebidae
- Subfamily: Calpinae
- Genus: Lepidodes; Guenée, 1852

Synonyms
- Baecula Walker, 1856; Metaprionota Hampson, 1926

Genus of moths

Lepidodes is a genus of moths of the family Nolidae. The genus was erected by Achille Guenée in 1852.

== Species ==
- Lepidodes gallopavo (Walker, 1856)
- Lepidodes limbulata Guenée, 1852
- Lepidodes limicola Dognin, 1912
- Lepidodes lorenae Barbut & Lalanne Cassou, 2003
- Lepidodes pectinata Schaus, 1904
- Lepidodes sculpta (Felder & Rogenhofer, 1874)
