= Behrensia bicolor =

Scientific classification
- Domain: Eukaryota
- Kingdom: Animalia
- Phylum: Arthropoda
- Class: Insecta
- Order: Lepidoptera
- Superfamily: Noctuoidea
- Family: Noctuidae
- Genus: Behrensia
- Species: B. bicolor

Binomial name
- Behrensia bicolor McDunnough, 1941

Species of moth

Behrensia bicolor is a species of moth in the family Noctuidae (the owlet moths). It is found in North America.

The MONA or Hodges number for Behrensia bicolor is 10179.
