= Bulia schausi =

Scientific classification
- Kingdom: Animalia
- Phylum: Arthropoda
- Class: Insecta
- Order: Lepidoptera
- Superfamily: Noctuoidea
- Family: Erebidae
- Genus: Bulia
- Species: B. schausi

Binomial name
- Bulia schausi Richards, 1936

Species of moth

Bulia schausi is a moth of the family Erebidae. It is found in north-western Mexico, with strays as far north as Arizona, though it was first found in Tehuacan, Mexico.
