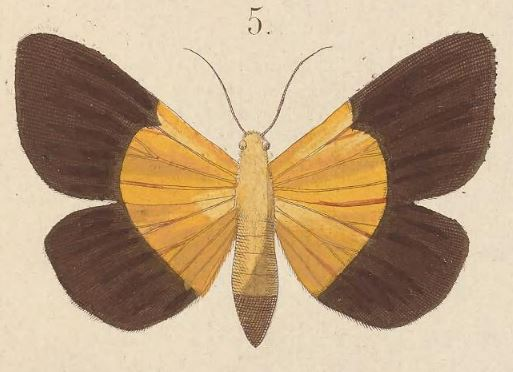

Scientific classification
- Domain: Eukaryota
- Kingdom: Animalia
- Phylum: Arthropoda
- Class: Insecta
- Order: Lepidoptera
- Superfamily: Noctuoidea
- Family: Erebidae
- Genus: Baputa
- Species: B. dichroa

Binomial name
- Baputa dichroa Kirsch, 1877

Synonyms
- Baputa bipartita Warren, 1912

= Baputa dichroa =

Species of moth

Baputa dichroa is a moth of the family Noctuidae. It is found on New Guinea.
