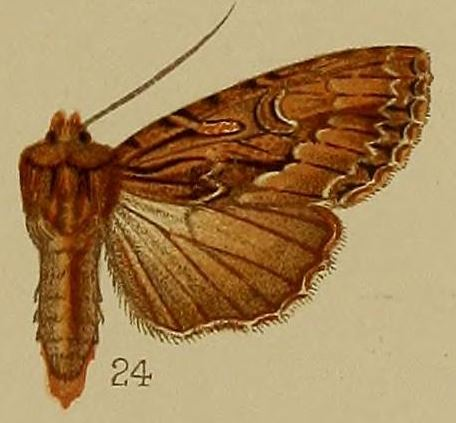

Scientific classification
- Kingdom: Animalia
- Phylum: Arthropoda
- Class: Insecta
- Order: Lepidoptera
- Superfamily: Noctuoidea
- Family: Noctuidae
- Genus: Blepharita
- Species: B. leucocyma

Binomial name
- Blepharita leucocyma (Hampson 1907)

Synonyms
- Anytus lencocyma Hampson 1907

= Blepharita leucocyma =

Species of moth

Blepharita leucocyma is a moth of the family Noctuidae. It is found in India.
