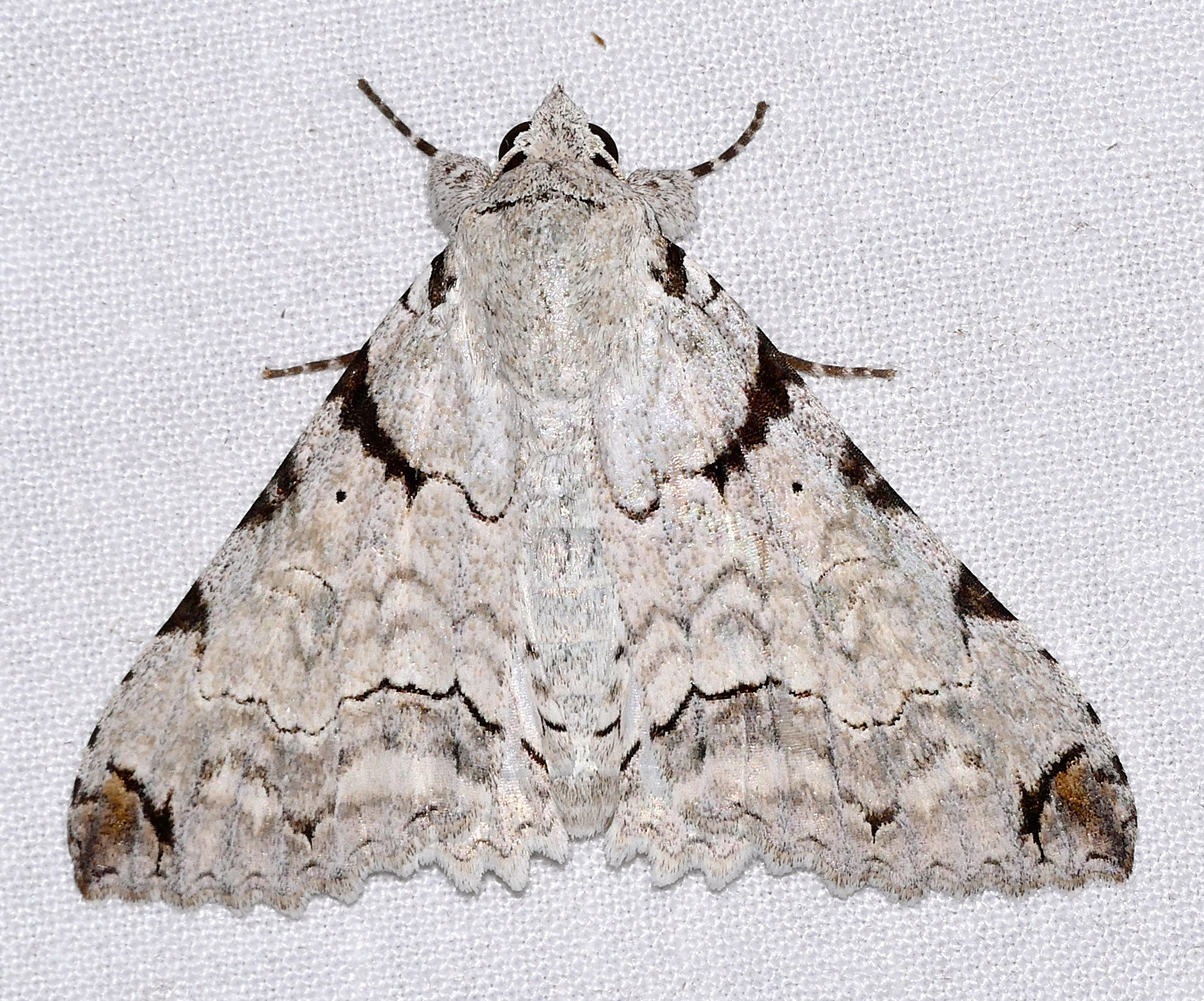

Scientific classification
- Domain: Eukaryota
- Kingdom: Animalia
- Phylum: Arthropoda
- Class: Insecta
- Order: Lepidoptera
- Superfamily: Noctuoidea
- Family: Erebidae
- Genus: Orodesma
- Species: O. apicina

Binomial name
- Orodesma apicina Herrich-Schäffer, 1868

Synonyms
- Catocala juanita Schaus, 1894; Polia lorina Druce, 1890; Boryzola nigrosparsata Draudt & Gaede, 1944; Orodesma obliqua Todd, 1964

= Orodesma apicina =

Species of moth

Orodesma apicina is a species of moth in the family Erebidae first described by Gottlieb August Wilhelm Herrich-Schäffer in 1868. The species is found in Florida, Central America and Cuba. It is sometimes recorded in Great Britain through accidental importation in produce.
