= Blepharoa mamestrina =

Beriotisia typhlina

Scientific classification
- Kingdom: Animalia
- Phylum: Arthropoda
- Class: Insecta
- Order: Lepidoptera
- Superfamily: Noctuoidea
- Family: Noctuidae
- Genus: Blepharoa
- Species: B. mamestrina

Binomial name
- Blepharoa mamestrina (Butler, 1882)

Synonyms
- Agrotis mamestrina Butler, 1882; Agrotis chionidia Butler, 1882

Species of moth

Blepharoa mamestrina is a moth of the family Noctuidae. It is found in Chile and Peru.

The wingspan is about 39 millimetres (1.5 in). Adults are on wing from September to April.
