= Brevipecten captata =

Scientific classification
- Kingdom: Animalia
- Phylum: Arthropoda
- Clade: Pancrustacea
- Class: Insecta
- Order: Lepidoptera
- Superfamily: Noctuoidea
- Family: Erebidae
- Genus: Brevipecten
- Species: B. captata

Binomial name
- Brevipecten captata (Butler, 1889)

Synonyms
- Oglasa captata Butler, 1889; Euclidia captata Butler, 1889; Brevipecten promona Swinhoe, 1918

Species of moth

Brevipecten captata is a moth of the family Noctuidae first described by Arthur Gardiner Butler in 1889.

== Distribution ==
It is found in India, Sri Lanka, and Australia.

== Description ==
Its wingspan is about 3 cm. Adults are pale brown. On the forewings there are two white bordered dark patches on the costa. Hindwings are plain pale brown.
