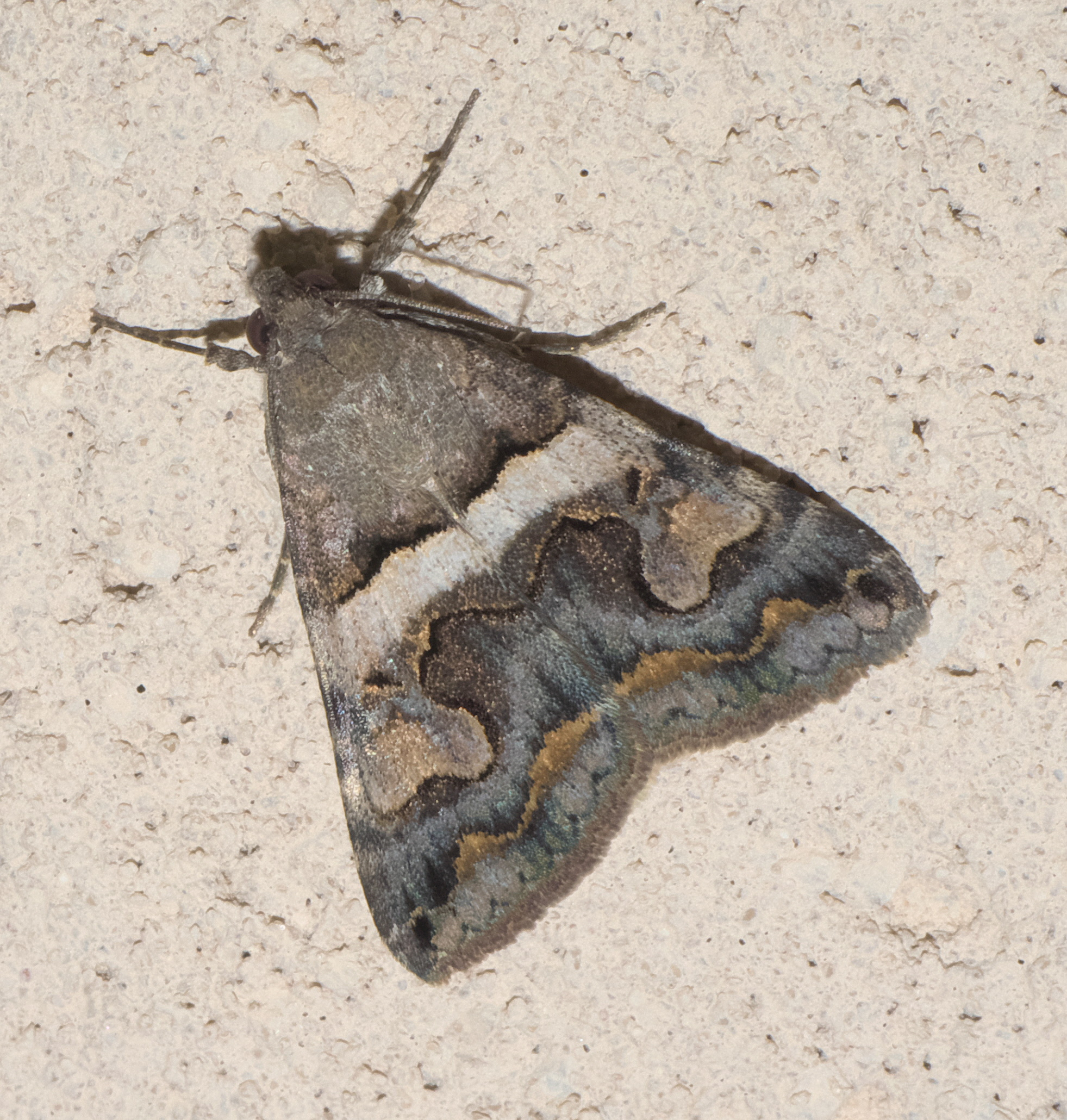

Scientific classification
- Domain: Eukaryota
- Kingdom: Animalia
- Phylum: Arthropoda
- Class: Insecta
- Order: Lepidoptera
- Superfamily: Noctuoidea
- Family: Erebidae
- Genus: Bulia
- Species: B. deducta

Binomial name
- Bulia deducta (Morrison, 1875)

Synonyms
- Syneda deducta Morrison, 1875; Syneda pavitensis Morrison, 1875; Cirrhobolina incandescens Grote, 1875; Cirrhobolina mexicana var. vulpina Edwards, 1882; Syneda mexicana var. albina Strecker, 1900

= Bulia deducta =

Species of moth

Bulia deducta is a moth of the family Erebidae first described by Herbert Knowles Morrison in 1875. It is found from central Mexico north to central California, Utah, Wyoming and Nebraska, east to Arkansas and Alabama.

Its wingspan is 34–38 mm. Adults are on wing from March to October in the southwest.

The larvae feed on Prosopis.
