= Boryzops torresi =

Scientific classification
- Domain: Eukaryota
- Kingdom: Animalia
- Phylum: Arthropoda
- Class: Insecta
- Order: Lepidoptera
- Superfamily: Noctuoidea
- Family: Erebidae
- Genus: Boryzops
- Species: B. torresi

Binomial name
- Boryzops torresi (Dognin, 1889)

Synonyms
- Xylophasia torresi Dognin, 1889

Species of moth

Boryzops torresi is a species of moth of the family Erebidae. It is found in Loja Province, Ecuador.
