= Metaprionota =

Scientific classification
- Kingdom: Animalia
- Phylum: Arthropoda
- Class: Insecta
- Order: Lepidoptera
- Superfamily: Noctuoidea
- Family: Erebidae
- Subfamily: Calpinae
- Genus: Metaprionota; Hampson, 1926
- Species: M. sculpta

Binomial name
- Metaprionota sculpta Felder, 1874

Genus of moths

Metaprionota is a monotypic moth genus of the family Erebidae erected by George Hampson in 1926. Its only species, Metaprionota sculpta, was first described by Felder in 1874. It is found in French Guiana.

Butterflies and Moths of the World gives this name as a synonym of Lepidodes Guenée, 1852.
