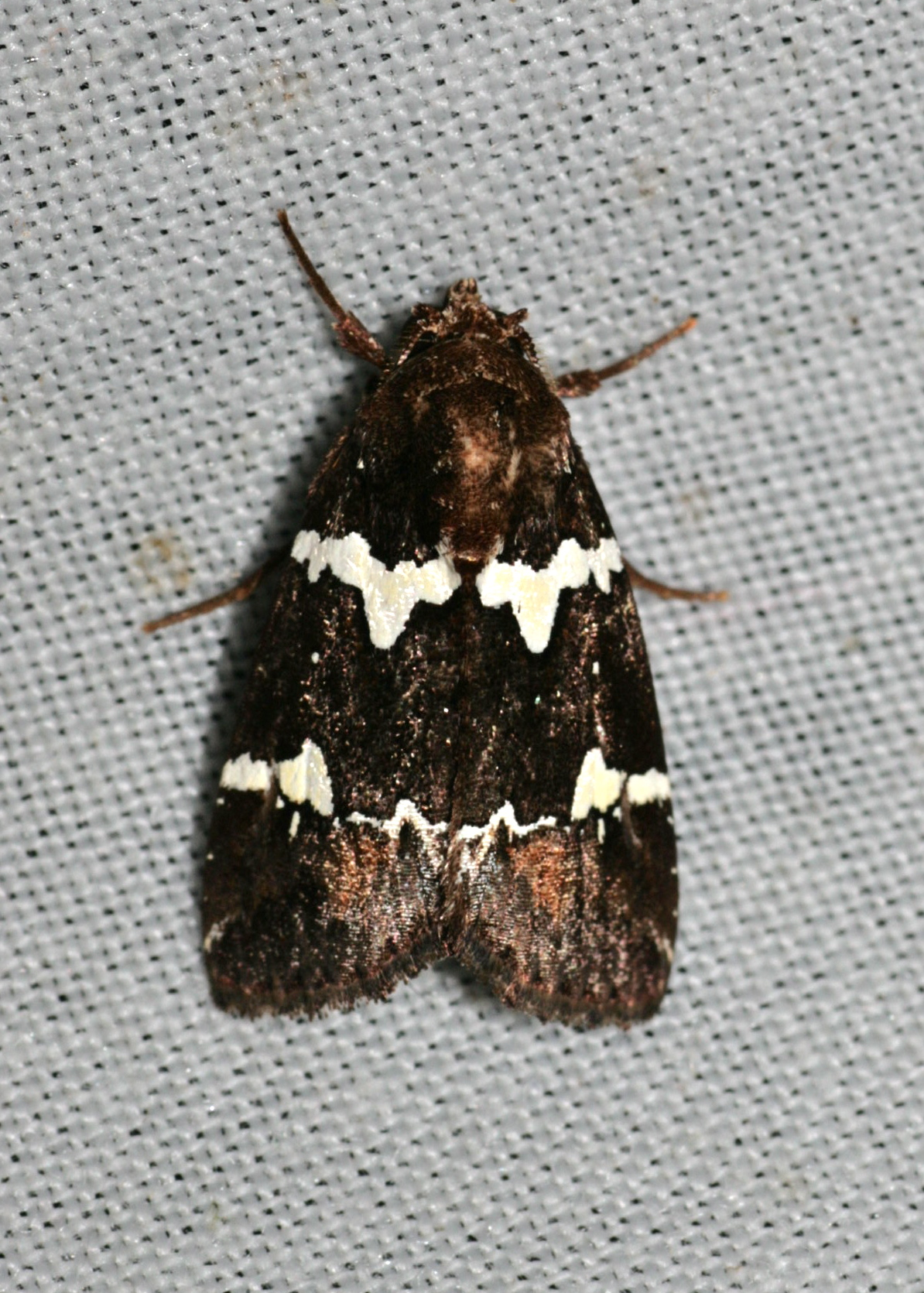

Scientific classification
- Kingdom: Animalia
- Phylum: Arthropoda
- Class: Insecta
- Order: Lepidoptera
- Superfamily: Noctuoidea
- Family: Noctuidae
- Genus: Borbotana
- Species: B. nivifascia

Binomial name
- Borbotana nivifascia Walker, 1858

Synonyms
- Choluata eburneifera Walker, [1863]; Heterochroma leucographa Snellen, 1877

= Borbotana nivifascia =

Species of moth

Borbotana nivifascia is a moth in the family Noctuidae. It is found in the north-eastern part of the Himalaya, Burma, Sundaland, Sulawesi and from the Moluccas to the Solomons. It is also known from Papua New Guinea and Australia (Queensland).

== Subspecies ==
- Borbotana nivifascia nivifascia (Australia)
- Borbotana nivifascia tumefacta Warren, 1913 (Himalaya)
- Borbotana nivifascia longidens Prout, 1926 (Burma, Sundaland, Sulawesi, Moluccas to Solomons)
