= Belosticta parki =

Scientific classification
- Kingdom: Animalia
- Phylum: Arthropoda
- Class: Insecta
- Order: Lepidoptera
- Superfamily: Noctuoidea
- Family: Noctuidae
- Subfamily: Cuculliinae
- Genus: Belosticta
- Species: B. parki

Binomial name
- Belosticta parki Kononenko & Ronkay, 1998

Synonyms
- Meganephria parki Kononenko & Ronkay, 1998; Meganephria (Belosticta) parki Kononenko & Ronkay, 1998; Belosticta (Belosticta) parki (Kononenko & Ronkay, 1998)

Species of moth

Belosticta parki is a species of moth of the family Noctuidae, that was first described in 1998 by the Russian entomologist, Vladimir Stepanovich Kononenko and the Hungarian entomologist, László Aladár Ronkay as Meganephria parki. The type specimen was collected in Chuncheon, South Korea.

The species is endemic to the Korean Peninsula, where it has been found in Gyeonggi-do and Gangwon-do.
