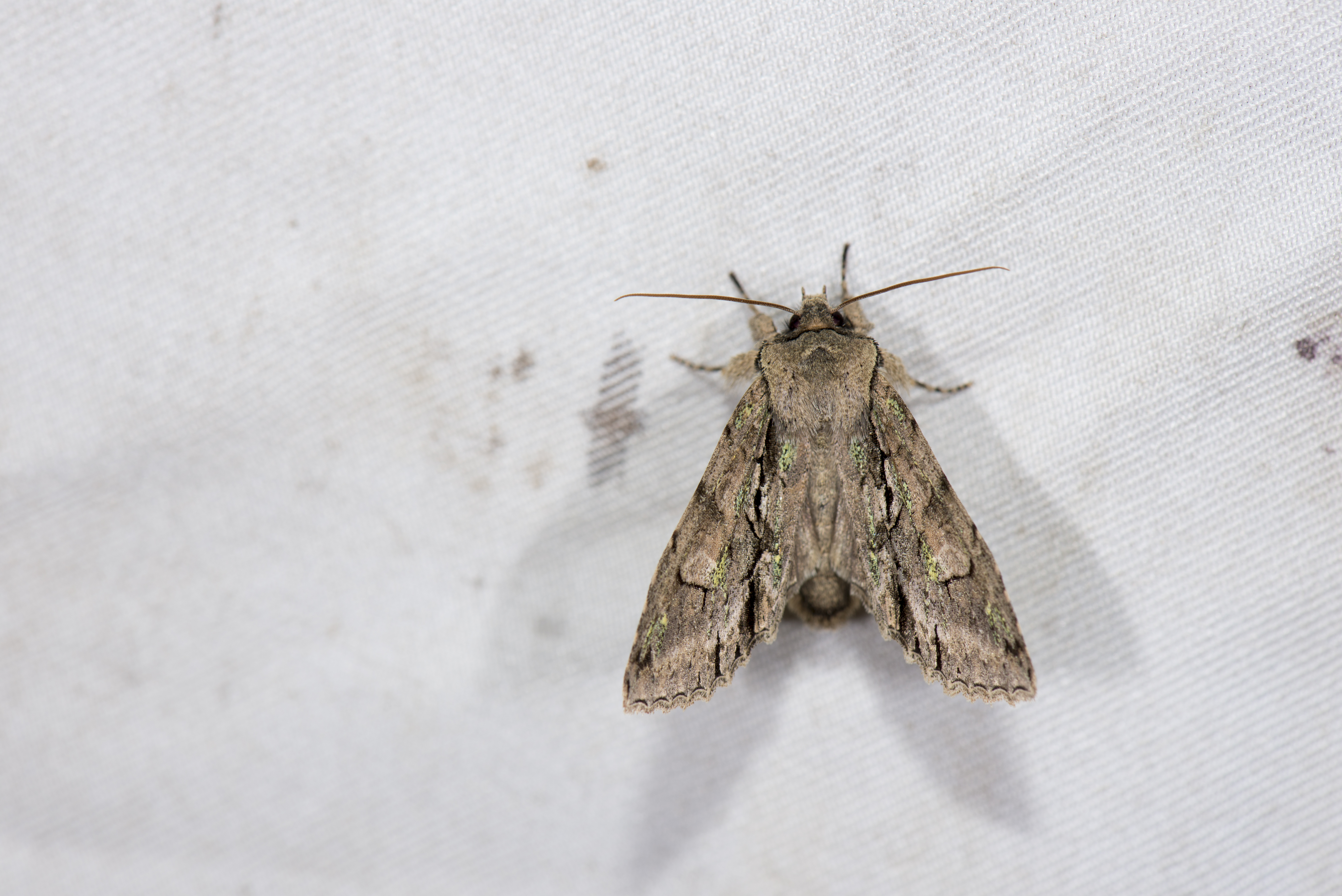
- Belosticta crassa

Scientific classification
- Kingdom: Animalia
- Phylum: Arthropoda
- Class: Insecta
- Order: Lepidoptera
- Superfamily: Noctuoidea
- Family: Noctuidae
- Subfamily: Cuculliinae
- Genus: Belosticta; Butler, 1879

Type species
- Belosticta extensa Butler, 1879

= Belosticta =

Genus of moths

Belosticta is a genus of moths of the family Noctuidae, that was first described in 1879 by Arthur Gardiner Butler. The type species was collected in Japan.

== Species ==
Listed by GBIF.

- Belosticta cinerea Butler, 1881
- Belosticta becheri Ronkay, Ronkay, Gyulai & Hacker, 2010
- Belosticta crassa Kobayashi & Owada, 1996
- Belosticta extensa Butler, 1879
- Belosticta funesta Leech, 1889
- Belosticta laxa Kobayashi & Owada, 1996
- Belosticta parki Kononenko & Ronkay, 1998
- Belosticta splendida Yoshimoto, 1993
- Belosticta uniformis Ronkay, Ronkay, Gyulai & Hacker, 2010
