= Beriohansa =

Scientific classification
- Domain: Eukaryota
- Kingdom: Animalia
- Phylum: Arthropoda
- Class: Insecta
- Order: Lepidoptera
- Superfamily: Noctuoidea
- Family: Noctuidae (?)
- Subfamily: Catocalinae
- Genus: Beriohansa; Nye, 1975
- Species: B. hansali

Binomial name
- Beriohansa hansali Felder, 1874

Genus of moths

Beriohansa is a monotypic moth genus of the family Noctuidae described by Nye in 1975. Its only species, Beriohansa hansali, was first described by Felder in 1874. It is found in Ethiopia.
