= Barcita =

Scientific classification
- Domain: Eukaryota
- Kingdom: Animalia
- Phylum: Arthropoda
- Class: Insecta
- Order: Lepidoptera
- Superfamily: Noctuoidea
- Family: Erebidae
- Subfamily: Calpinae
- Genus: Barcita; Moschler, 1886

Synonyms
- Phialta Schaus, 1901

Genus of moths

Barcita is a genus of moths of the family Erebidae. The genus was erected by Moschler in 1886.

== Species ==
- Barcita duomita (Schaus, 1901)
- Barcita ilia (Druce, 1889)
- Barcita subviridescens (Walker, 1858)
