= Boryza =

Scientific classification
- Kingdom: Animalia
- Phylum: Arthropoda
- Class: Insecta
- Order: Lepidoptera
- Superfamily: Noctuoidea
- Family: Erebidae
- Subfamily: Calpinae
- Genus: Boryza; Walker, 1858

Genus of moths

Boryza is a genus of moths of the family Noctuidae.

== Species ==
- Boryza aeraria Schaus, 1912
- Boryza commiscens Walker, 1858
