= Brithodes =

Scientific classification
- Domain: Eukaryota
- Kingdom: Animalia
- Phylum: Arthropoda
- Class: Insecta
- Order: Lepidoptera
- Superfamily: Noctuoidea
- Family: Erebidae
- Subfamily: Hypeninae
- Genus: Brithodes; Bethune-Baker, 1908
- Species: B. quadrilineata

Binomial name
- Brithodes quadrilineata Bethune-Baker, 1908

Genus of moths

Brithodes is a monotypic moth genus of the family Erebidae. Its only species, Brithodes quadrilineata, is known from New Guinea. Both the genus and the species were first described by George Thomas Bethune-Baker in 1908.
