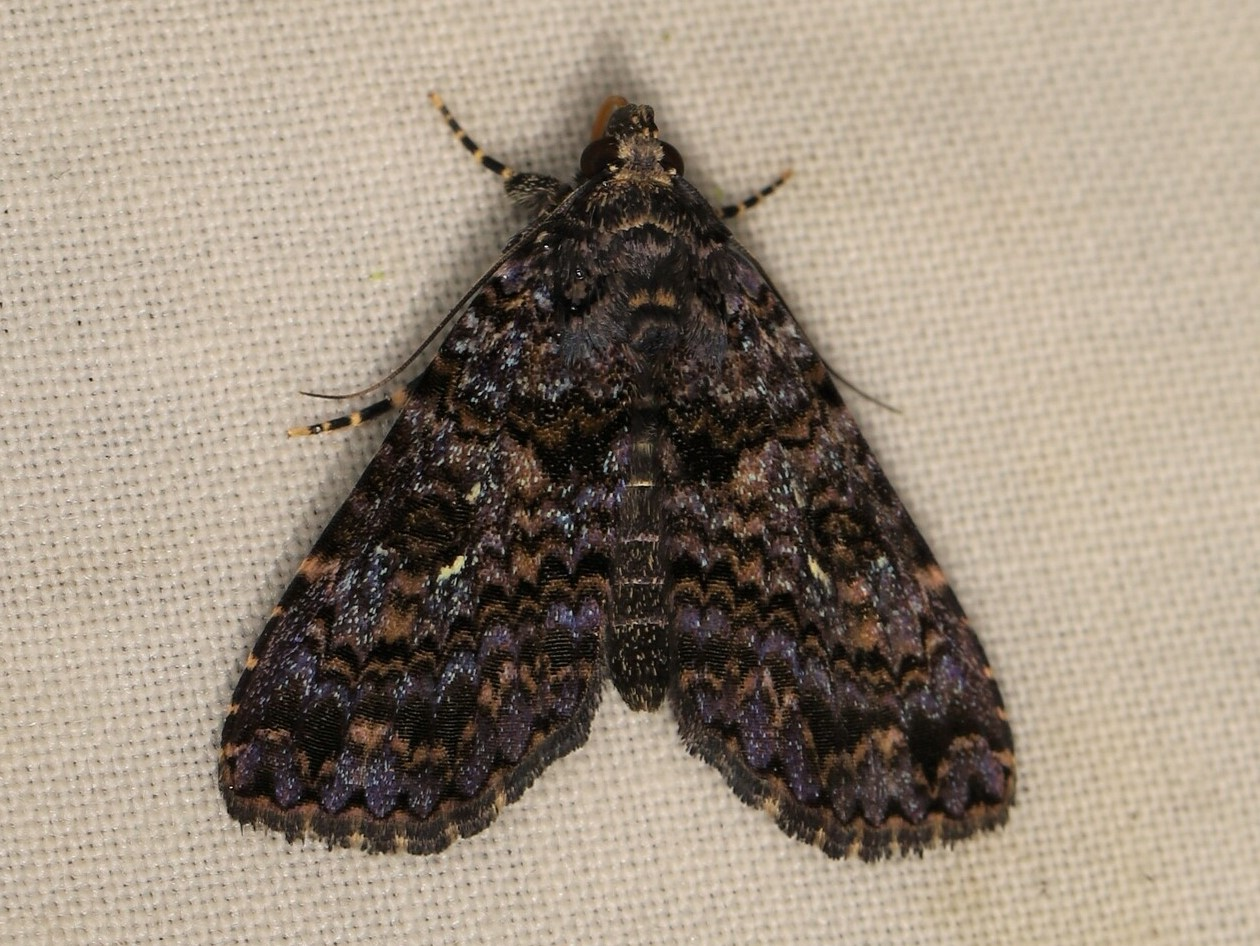
- Bithiga rubrisparsa

Scientific classification
- Kingdom: Animalia
- Phylum: Arthropoda
- Class: Insecta
- Order: Lepidoptera
- Superfamily: Noctuoidea
- Family: Erebidae
- Subfamily: Calpinae
- Genus: Bithiga; Walker, 1865

= Bithiga =

Genus of moths

Bithiga is a genus of moths of the family Erebidae. The genus was erected by Francis Walker in 1865.

== Species ==
- Bithiga ardesiaca Schaus, 1912
- Bithiga rubrisparsa Walker, 1865
