= Bucinna =

Scientific classification
- Kingdom: Animalia
- Phylum: Arthropoda
- Class: Insecta
- Order: Lepidoptera
- Superfamily: Noctuoidea
- Family: Erebidae
- Subfamily: Calpinae
- Genus: Bucinna; Walker, 1866

Genus of moths

Bucinna is a genus of moths of the family Noctuidae.

== Species ==
- Bucinna divisalis (Walker, 1866)
- Bucinna obagitalis (Walker, 1859)
