= Bleptinodes =

Scientific classification
- Kingdom: Animalia
- Phylum: Arthropoda
- Class: Insecta
- Order: Lepidoptera
- Superfamily: Noctuoidea
- Family: Erebidae
- Subfamily: Hypeninae
- Genus: Bleptinodes; Hampson, 1925

Genus of moths

Bleptinodes is a genus of moths of the family Erebidae. The genus was erected by George Hampson in 1925.

== Species ==
- Bleptinodes borbonica de Joannis, 1932 Reunion
- Bleptinodes perumbrosa (Hampson, 1898) Meghalaya
- Bleptinodes tanaocrossa Prout, 1928 Borneo
