= Bolica =

Scientific classification
- Kingdom: Animalia
- Phylum: Arthropoda
- Class: Insecta
- Order: Lepidoptera
- Superfamily: Noctuoidea
- Family: Erebidae
- Subfamily: Calpinae
- Genus: Bolica; Walker, 1862
- Species: B. armata

Binomial name
- Bolica armata Walker, 1862

Genus of moths

Bolica is a monotypic moth genus of the family Erebidae. Its only species, Bolica armata, is found in Brazil. Both the genus and the species were first described by Francis Walker in 1862.
