= Biareolifera =

Scientific classification
- Domain: Eukaryota
- Kingdom: Animalia
- Phylum: Arthropoda
- Class: Insecta
- Order: Lepidoptera
- Superfamily: Noctuoidea
- Family: Erebidae
- Subfamily: Calpinae
- Genus: Biareolifera; Strand, 1915
- Species: B. geometriformis

Binomial name
- Biareolifera geometriformis Strand, 1915

Genus of moths

Biareolifera is a genus of moths of the family Noctuidae. It contains only one species, Biareolifera geometriformis, which is found in Cameroon, the Democratic Republic of Congo (Orientale), Ghana and Nigeria.
