= Lophomilia =

Scientific classification
- Domain: Eukaryota
- Kingdom: Animalia
- Phylum: Arthropoda
- Class: Insecta
- Order: Lepidoptera
- Superfamily: Noctuoidea
- Family: Noctuidae
- Subfamily: Acontiinae
- Genus: Lophomilia; Warren, 1913

Synonyms
- Atuntsea Berio, 1977; Bryograpta Sugi, 1977

Genus of moths

Lophomilia is a genus of moths of the family Erebidae. The genus was described by Warren in 1913.

== Species ==
- Lophomilia albicosta Yoshimoto, 1995
- Lophomilia albistria Yoshimoto, 1993
- Lophomilia diehli Kononenko & Behounek, 2009
- Lophomilia flaviplaga (Warren, 1912)
- Lophomilia fusca Sohn & Ronkay, 2011
- Lophomilia hoenei Berio, 1977
- Lophomilia kobesi Kononenko & Behounek, 2009
- Lophomilia kogii Sugi, 1977
- Lophomilia nekrasovi Kononenko & Behounek, 2009
- Lophomilia polybapta (Butler, 1879)
- Lophomilia posteburna Sohn & Ronkay, 2011
- Lophomilia rustica Kononenko & Behounek, 2009
- Lophomilia striatipurpurea Holloway, 1976
- Lophomilia takao Sugi, 1962
- Lophomilia violescens Yoshimoto, 1993
