= Coeriana =

Scientific classification
- Kingdom: Animalia
- Phylum: Arthropoda
- Class: Insecta
- Order: Lepidoptera
- Superfamily: Noctuoidea
- Family: Erebidae
- Subfamily: Calpinae
- Genus: Coeriana; Walker, 1858

Synonyms
- Buphana Möschler, 1880; Leptoctenista Walker, 1891; Burdettia Schaus, 1916

Genus of moths

Coeriana is a genus of moths of the family Erebidae. The genus was erected by Francis Walker in 1858.

== Species ==
- Coeriana amabilis Möschler, 1880
- Coeriana amphibola Dognin, 1914
- Coeriana braziliensis Schaus, 1904
- Coeriana clandestina Walker, 1858
- Coeriana crenulata Hampson, 1926
- Coeriana dianephele Hampson, 1926
- Coeriana dubia Warren, 1891
- Coeriana endophaea Hampson, 1926
- Coeriana funebris Schaus, 1914
- Coeriana funerea Warren, 1889
- Coeriana grandimacula Schaus, 1914
- Coeriana hadenoides Schaus, 1914
- Coeriana lignea Schaus, 1914
- Coeriana lignealis Schaus, 1904
- Coeriana malonia Schaus, 1914
- Coeriana nyctosia Hampson, 1926
- Coeriana oreas Schaus, 1914
- Coeriana phaeobasia Hampson, 1926
- Coeriana pretiosa Schaus, 1913
- Coeriana rivalis Schaus, 1904
- Coeriana ursipes Hübner, 1823
- Coeriana zopissa Möschler, 1880
