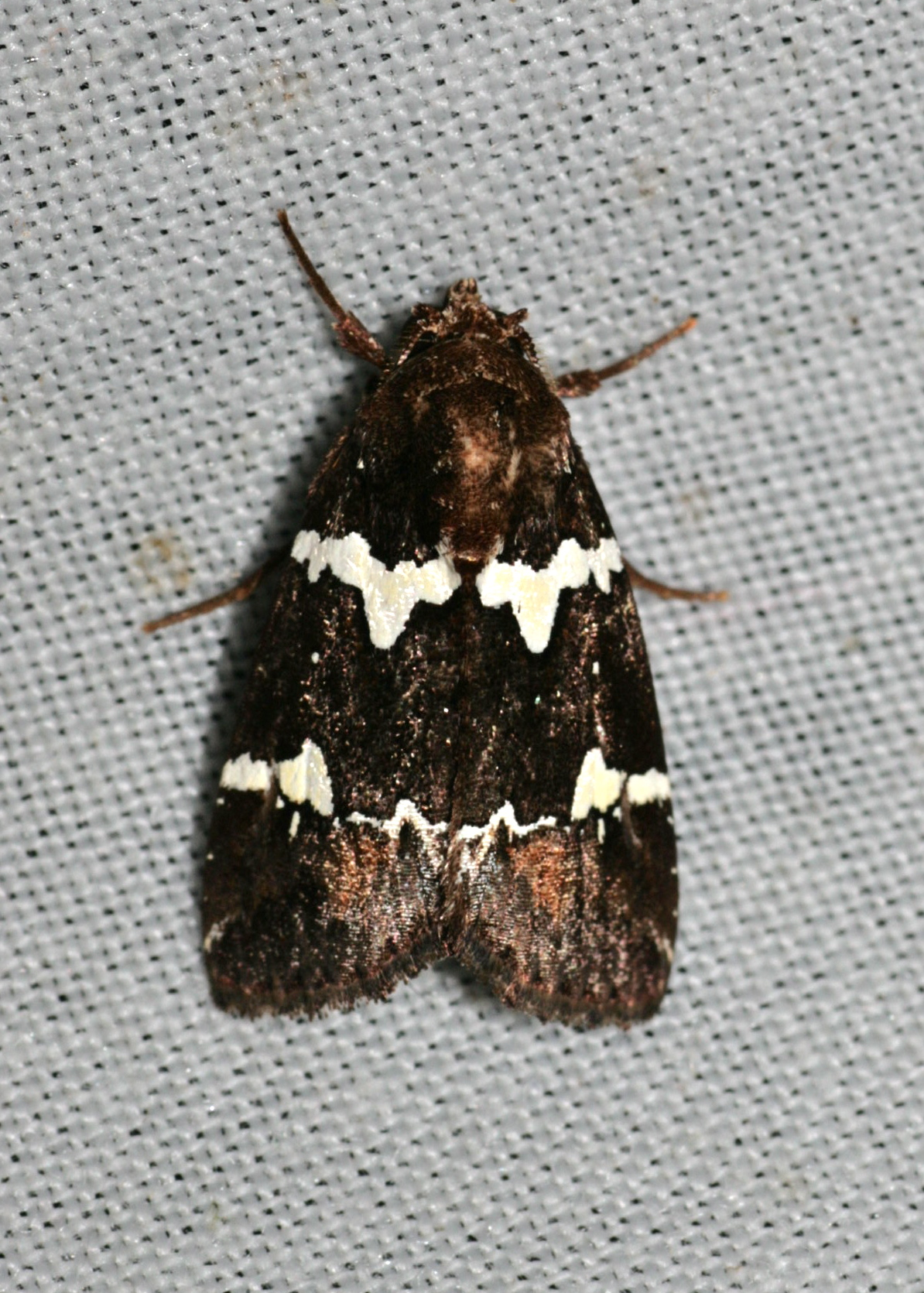
- Borbotana nivifascia

Scientific classification
- Kingdom: Animalia
- Phylum: Arthropoda
- Class: Insecta
- Order: Lepidoptera
- Superfamily: Noctuoidea
- Family: Noctuidae
- Tribe: Xylenini
- Genus: Borbotana; Walker, 1858

Synonyms
- Choluata Walker, [1863]

= Borbotana =

Genus of moths

Borbotana is a genus of moths of the family Noctuidae. The genus was erected by Francis Walker in 1858.

== Species ==
- Borbotana dinawa Bethune-Baker, 1906 New Guinea
- Borbotana distorimacula Warren, 1913 New Guinea
- Borbotana ekeikei Bethune-Baker, 1906 New Guinea
- Borbotana fragmentata Warren, 1913 New Guinea
- Borbotana guttata Warren, 1913 New Guinea
- Borbotana kebeae Bethune-Baker, 1906 New Guinea
- Borbotana nivifascia Walker, 1858 Sumatra, Borneo
- Borbotana petrae Behounek, 2000 Philippines
- Borbotana piskatschekae Behounek, 2000 Flores
