= Menecina =

Scientific classification
- Kingdom: Animalia
- Phylum: Arthropoda
- Class: Insecta
- Order: Lepidoptera
- Superfamily: Noctuoidea
- Family: Erebidae
- Subfamily: Calpinae
- Genus: Menecina; Walker, 1858
- Species: M. bifacies

Binomial name
- Menecina bifacies Walker, 1858

Synonyms
- Generic: Blanona Walker, 1865; Specific: Menecina selenisoides Walker, 1865; Menecina tunicula Felder, 1874

Genus of moths

Menecina is a monotypic moth genus of the family Erebidae. Its only species, Menecina bifacies, is found in Brazil. Both the genus and the species were first described by Francis Walker in 1858.
