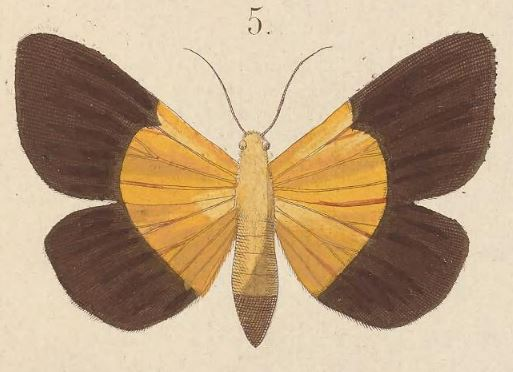
- Baputa dichroa

Scientific classification
- Kingdom: Animalia
- Phylum: Arthropoda
- Class: Insecta
- Order: Lepidoptera
- Superfamily: Noctuoidea
- Family: Erebidae
- Subfamily: Calpinae
- Genus: Baputa; Walker, 1865

= Baputa =

Genus of moths

Baputa is a genus of moths of the family Noctuidae.

== Species ==
- Baputa dichroa Kirsch, 1877
- Baputa dimidiata Walker, 1865
