= Yidalpta =

Scientific classification
- Domain: Eukaryota
- Kingdom: Animalia
- Phylum: Arthropoda
- Class: Insecta
- Order: Lepidoptera
- Superfamily: Noctuoidea
- Family: Erebidae
- Subfamily: Calpinae
- Genus: Yidalpta; Nye, 1975

Synonyms
- Platydia Guenée, 1854

Genus of moths

Yidalpta is a genus of moths of the family Erebidae. The genus was erected by Ian W. B. Nye in 1975.

== Species ==
- Yidalpta aequiferalis Walker, 1865
- Yidalpta auragalis Guenée, 1854
- Yidalpta flavagalis Guenée, 1854
- Yidalpta selenalis Snellen, 1872
- Yidalpta selenialis Snellen, 1872
- Yidalpta thetys Felder, 1874
