= Volazaha =

Scientific classification
- Kingdom: Animalia
- Phylum: Arthropoda
- Class: Insecta
- Order: Lepidoptera
- Superfamily: Noctuoidea
- Family: Erebidae
- Subfamily: Calpinae
- Genus: Volazaha; Viette, 1971
- Species: V. iridoplitis

Binomial name
- Volazaha iridoplitis Viette, 1971

Genus of moths

Volazaha is a monotypic moth genus of the family Erebidae. Its only species, Volazaha iridoplitis, is found on Madagascar. Both the genus and the species were first described by Pierre Viette in 1971.
