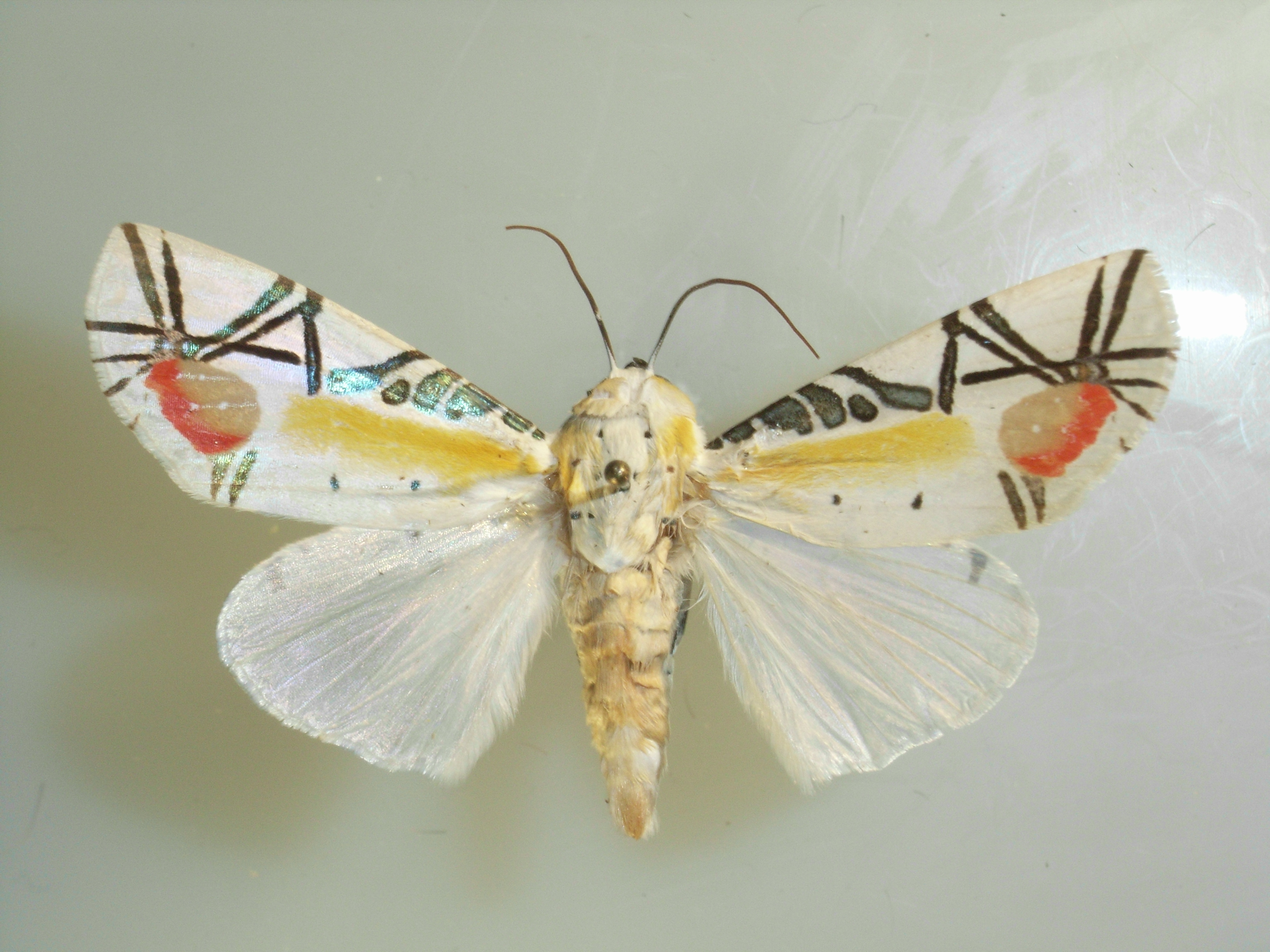
- Baorisa hieroglyphica

Scientific classification
- Domain: Eukaryota
- Kingdom: Animalia
- Phylum: Arthropoda
- Class: Insecta
- Order: Lepidoptera
- Superfamily: Noctuoidea
- Family: Erebidae
- Genus: Baorisa; Moore, 1882

= Baorisa =

Genus of moths

Baorisa is a genus of moths in the family Erebidae. It was long thought to be monotypic with the only species being Baorisa hieroglyphica.

== Species ==
The genus currently contains four species:

- Baorisa floresiana Behounek, Speidel and Thöny, 1996 (Flores)
- Baorisa hieroglyphica Moore, 1882
- Baorisa philippina Behounek, Speidel and Thöny, 1996 (Philippines)
- Baorisa sulawesiana Behounek, Speidel and Thöny, 1996 (Sulawesi)
