= Bornolis =

Scientific classification
- Kingdom: Animalia
- Phylum: Arthropoda
- Clade: Pancrustacea
- Class: Insecta
- Order: Lepidoptera
- Superfamily: Noctuoidea
- Family: Noctuidae
- Genus: Bornolis; Holloway, 1989

Genus of moths

Bornolis is a genus of moths of the family Noctuidae.

== Species ==
- Bornolis kamburonga (Holloway, 1976)
