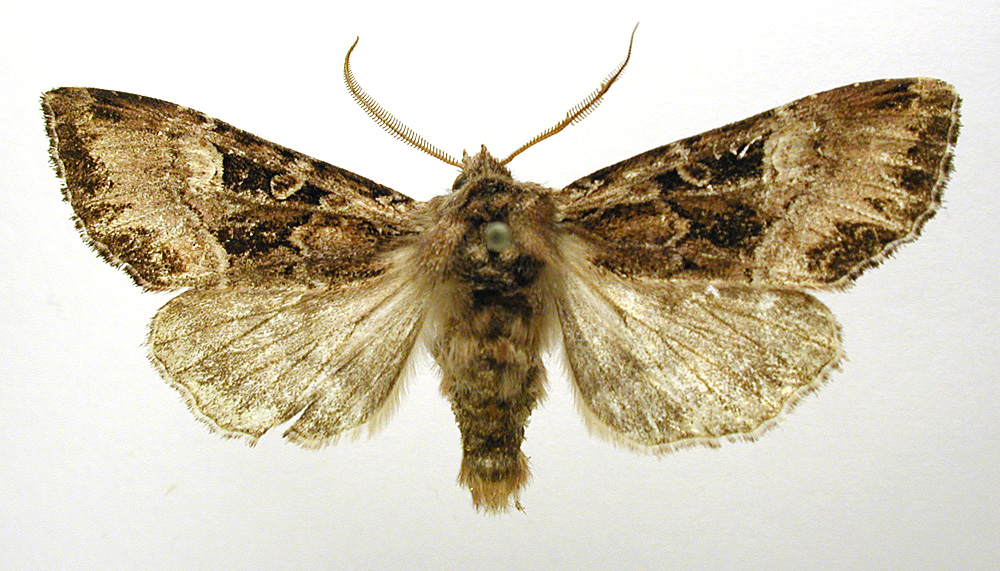
- Blepharita amica

Scientific classification
- Kingdom: Animalia
- Phylum: Arthropoda
- Class: Insecta
- Order: Lepidoptera
- Superfamily: Noctuoidea
- Family: Noctuidae
- Subtribe: Antitypina
- Genus: Blepharita; Hampson, 1907

= Blepharita =

Genus of moths

Blepharita is a genus of moths of the family Noctuidae.

== Species ==
- Blepharita amica (Treitschke, 1825)
- Blepharita dufayi Boursin, 1960
- Blepharita euplexina (Draudt, 1950)
- Blepharita flavistigma (Moore, 1867)
- Blepharita glenura (Swinhoe, 1895)
- Blepharita leucocyma (Hampson 1907)
- Blepharita niveiplaga (Walker, 1857)
- Blepharita timida (Staudinger, 1888)
