= Boalda =

Scientific classification
- Domain: Eukaryota
- Kingdom: Animalia
- Phylum: Arthropoda
- Class: Insecta
- Order: Lepidoptera
- Superfamily: Noctuoidea
- Family: Erebidae
- Subfamily: Hypeninae
- Genus: Boalda; Schaus, 1929
- Species: B. gyona

Binomial name
- Boalda gyona Schaus, 1929

Genus of moths

Boalda is a monotypic moth genus of the family Erebidae. Its only species, Boalda gyona, is known from the Brazilian state of Santa Catarina. Both the genus and the species were first described by William Schaus in 1929.
