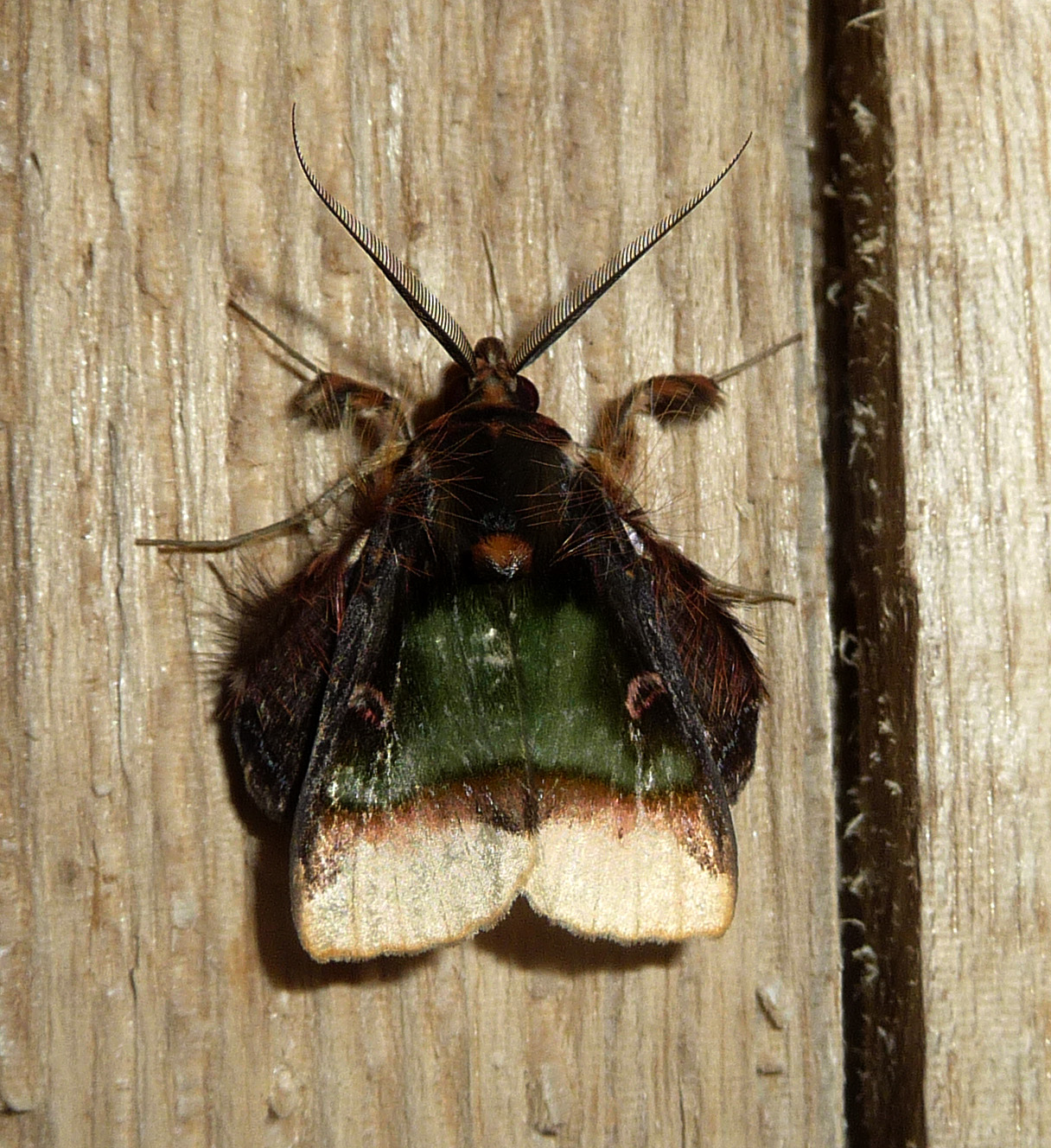
- Ceroctena amynta

Scientific classification
- Kingdom: Animalia
- Phylum: Arthropoda
- Clade: Pancrustacea
- Class: Insecta
- Order: Lepidoptera
- Superfamily: Noctuoidea
- Family: Erebidae
- Subfamily: Calpinae
- Genus: Ceroctena; Guenée, 1852

Type species
- Ceroctena amynta (Cramer, 1779)

Synonyms
- Betusa Walker, 1856; Giscala Walker, 1858

= Ceroctena =

Genus of moths

Ceroctena is a monotypic genus of moths of the family Erebidae. The sole species is Ceroctena amynta. The genus occurs in Central and South America.

Some sources recognize another species, Ceroctena intravirens (Dognin, 1900).
