= Bavilia =

Scientific classification
- Domain: Eukaryota
- Kingdom: Animalia
- Phylum: Arthropoda
- Class: Insecta
- Order: Lepidoptera
- Superfamily: Noctuoidea
- Family: Erebidae
- Subfamily: Calpinae
- Genus: Bavilia; Moschler, 1880

Genus of moths

Bavilia is a genus of moths of the family Noctuidae.

== Species ==
- Bavilia flavocostata Moschler, 1880
