= Buciara =

Scientific classification
- Kingdom: Animalia
- Phylum: Arthropoda
- Class: Insecta
- Order: Lepidoptera
- Superfamily: Noctuoidea
- Family: Noctuidae
- Subfamily: Noctuinae
- Genus: Buciara; Walker, 1869

Genus of moths

Buciara is a genus of moths of the family Noctuidae.

== Species ==
- Buciara bipartita Walker, 1869
