= Brevipecten =

Scientific classification
- Kingdom: Animalia
- Phylum: Arthropoda
- Class: Insecta
- Order: Lepidoptera
- Superfamily: Noctuoidea
- Family: Erebidae
- Subfamily: Calpinae
- Genus: Brevipecten; Hampson, 1894

Genus of moths

Brevipecten is a genus of moths of the family Noctuidae.

== Description ==
Palpi slight and reaching vertex of head. Antennae of male bipectinated to three-fourths length with long branches. Thorax and abdomen smoothly scaled. Tibia with slight tufts of hair on outer side. Forewings with rectangular apex. Inner margin nearly straight after the basal lobe. Veins 8 and 9 anastomosing to form areole. Hindwings with vein 5 from above angle of cell.

== Species ==
- Brevipecten captata (Butler, 1889)
- Brevipecten clearchus Fawcett, 1916
- Brevipecten consanguis Leech, 1900
- Brevipecten cornuta Hampson, 1902
- Brevipecten costiplaga Draudt, 1950
- Brevipecten dufayi Viette, 1976
- Brevipecten malagasy Viette, 1965
- Brevipecten niloticus Wiltshire, 1977
- Brevipecten purpureotincta Hampson, 1895
