= Macrodes =

Scientific classification
- Kingdom: Animalia
- Phylum: Arthropoda
- Class: Insecta
- Order: Lepidoptera
- Superfamily: Noctuoidea
- Family: Erebidae
- Subfamily: Calpinae
- Genus: Macrodes; Guenée, 1854

Synonyms
- Bulna Walker, 1865

Genus of moths

Macrodes is a genus of moths of the family Erebidae. The genus was erected by Achille Guenée in 1854.

== Species ==
- Macrodes columbalis Guenée, 1854
- Macrodes cynara Cramer, 1775
