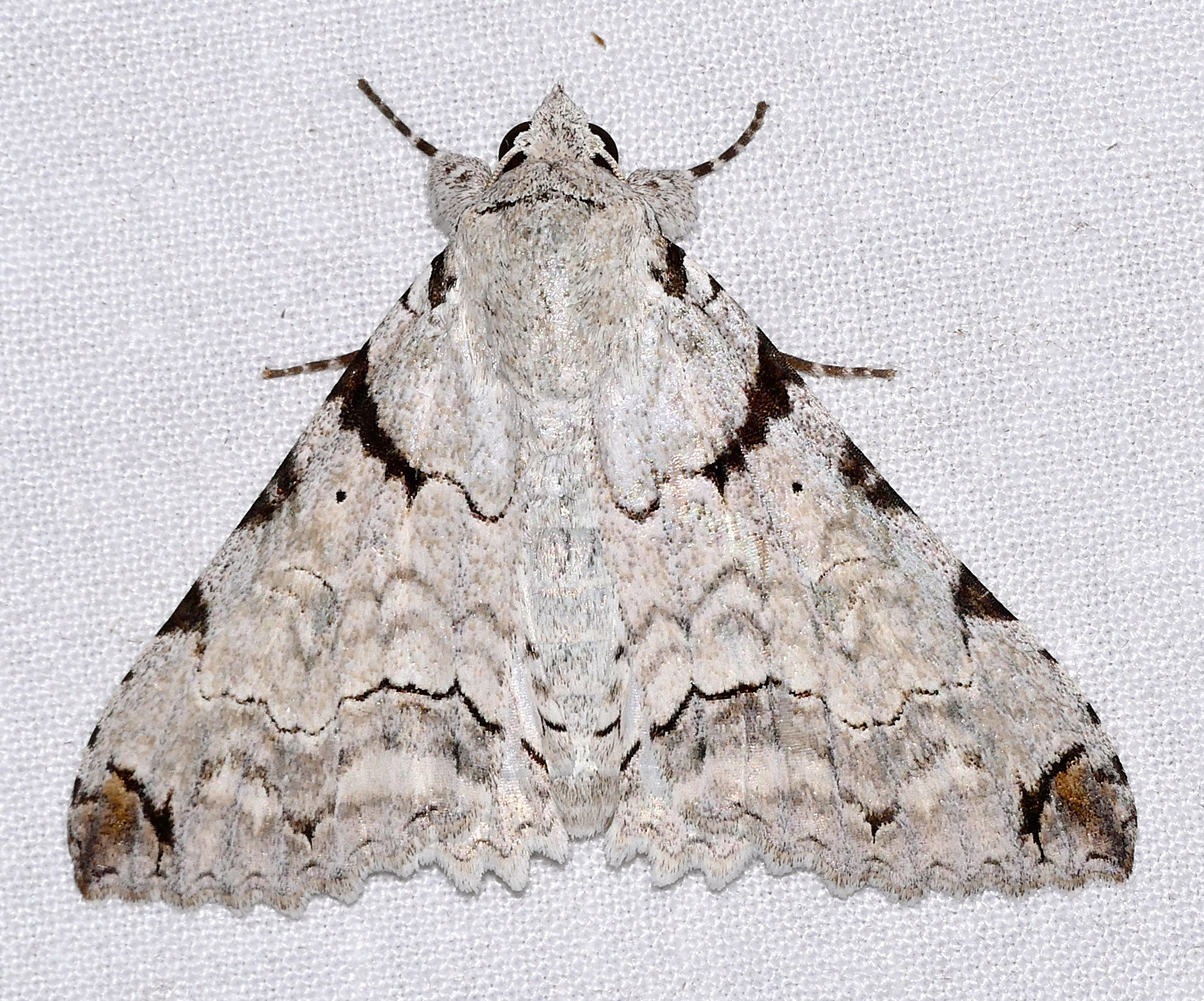
- Orodesma apicina

Scientific classification
- Domain: Eukaryota
- Kingdom: Animalia
- Phylum: Arthropoda
- Class: Insecta
- Order: Lepidoptera
- Superfamily: Noctuoidea
- Family: Erebidae
- Tribe: Melipotini
- Genus: Orodesma; Herrich-Schäffer, 1868

Synonyms
- Boryzola Hampson, 1926; Lois Dyar, 1924; Megastopolia Hampson, 1918; Poliothripa Hampson, 1912

= Orodesma =

Genus of moths

Orodesma is a genus of moths in the family Erebidae.

== Species ==
- Orodesma ameria (Druce, 1890)
- Orodesma apicina Herrich-Schäffer, 1868
- Orodesma cladonia (Felder & Rogenhofer, 1874)
- Orodesma demepa (Dyar, 1914)
- Orodesma elipha (Schaus, 1940)
- Orodesma fearni (Schaus, 1911)
- Orodesma monoflex (Dyar, 1924)
- Orodesma peratopis (Hampson, 1924)
- Orodesma pulverosa (Schaus, 1911)
- Orodesma schausi (Druce, 1890)
