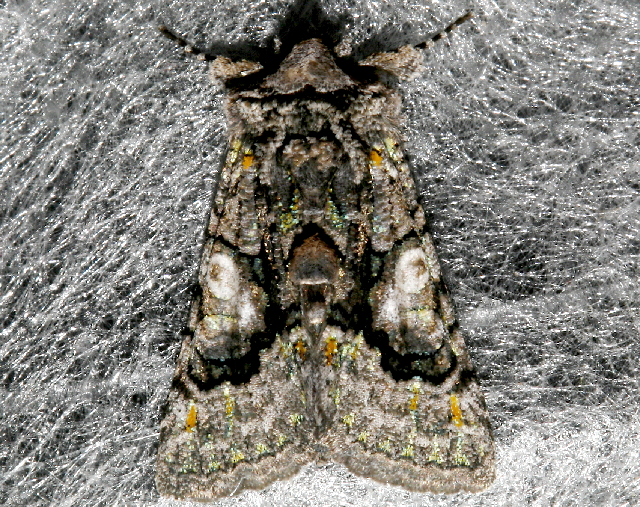
- Behrensia conchiformis

Scientific classification
- Domain: Eukaryota
- Kingdom: Animalia
- Phylum: Arthropoda
- Class: Insecta
- Order: Lepidoptera
- Superfamily: Noctuoidea
- Family: Noctuidae
- Subfamily: Oncocnemidinae
- Genus: Behrensia; Grote, 1875

= Behrensia =

Genus of moths

Behrensia is a genus of moths of the family Noctuidae.

== Species ==
- Behrensia bicolor McDunnough, 1941
- Behrensia conchiformis Grote, 1875
