= Beihania =

Scientific classification
- Kingdom: Animalia
- Phylum: Arthropoda
- Class: Insecta
- Order: Lepidoptera
- Superfamily: Noctuoidea
- Family: Erebidae
- Subfamily: Calpinae
- Genus: Beihania; Wiltshire, 1967

Genus of moths

Beihania is a genus of moths of the family Noctuidae.

== Species ==
- Beihania anartoides (Warnecke, 1938)
- Beihania cuculliela Wiltshire, 1967
- Beihania hyatti Wiltshire, 1967
- Beihania montaguei Wiltshire, 1980
- Beihania philbyi Wiltshire, 1980
