= Bradunia =

Scientific classification
- Domain: Eukaryota
- Kingdom: Animalia
- Phylum: Arthropoda
- Class: Insecta
- Order: Lepidoptera
- Superfamily: Noctuoidea
- Family: Erebidae
- Subfamily: Calpinae
- Genus: Bradunia; Dognin, 1914

Synonyms
- Bradunia Schaus, 1916

Genus of moths

Bradunia is a genus of moths of the family Noctuidae.

== Species ==
- Bradunia basistriga Hampson, 1926
- Bradunia costigutta (Schaus, 1916)
- Bradunia guanabana (Schaus, 1916)
- Bradunia improba (Schaus, 1916)
- Bradunia macella Dognin, 1914
