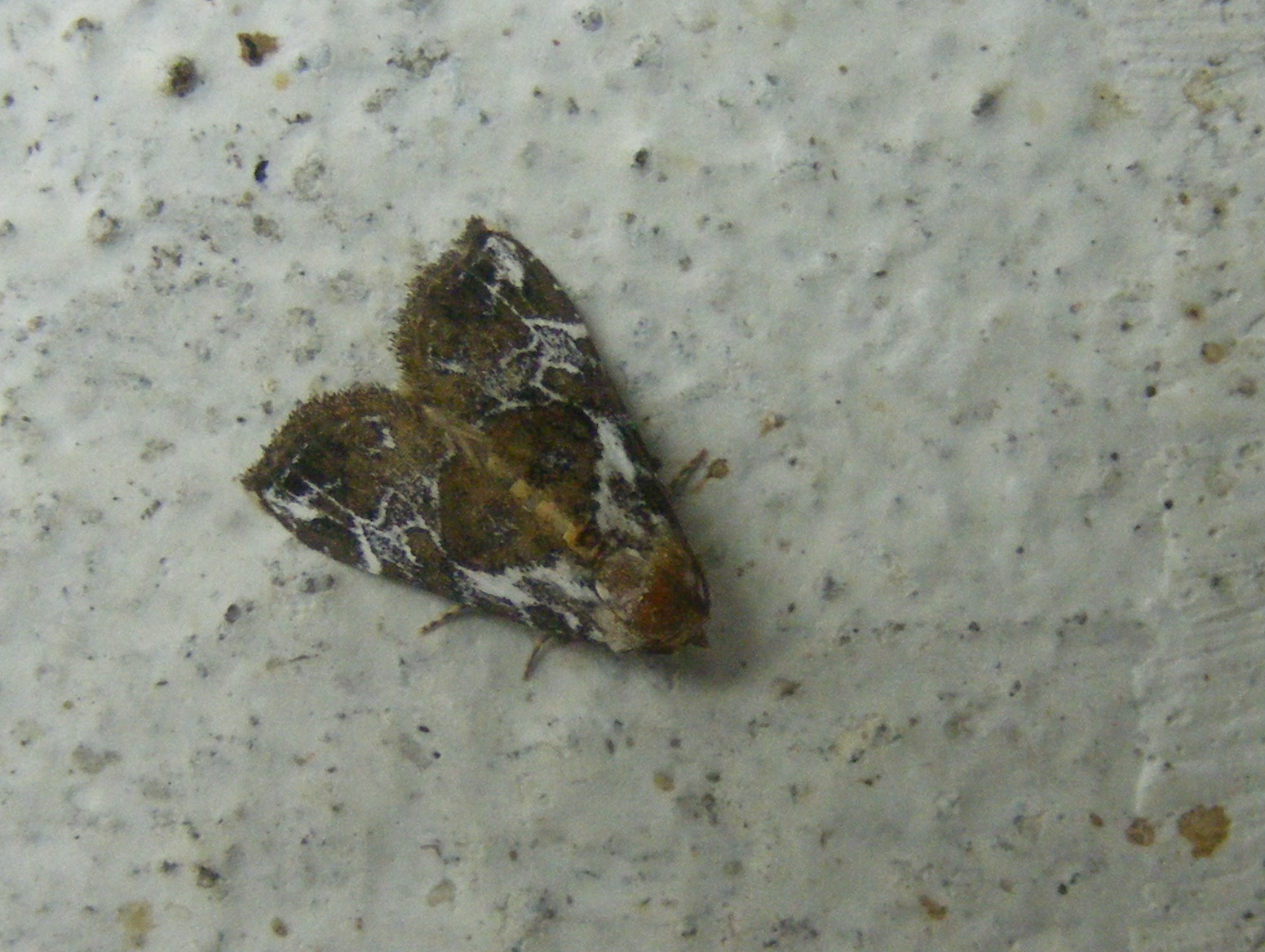
- Chorsia albiscripta

Scientific classification
- Kingdom: Animalia
- Phylum: Arthropoda
- Class: Insecta
- Order: Lepidoptera
- Superfamily: Noctuoidea
- Family: Erebidae
- Subfamily: Calpinae
- Genus: Chorsia; Walker, [1863]

Synonyms
- Bryophilina Staudinger, 1892; Poecilogramma Butler, 1892; Aeologramma Strand, 1910; Pseuderiopus Warren, 1913; Neustrotia Sugi, 1982

= Chorsia =

Genus of moths

Chorsia is a genus of moths of the family Erebidae. The genus was erected by Francis Walker in 1863.

== Species ==
- Chorsia albicincta (Hampson, 1898) Khasis
- Chorsia albiscripta (Hampson, 1898) Sri Lanka, southern India, Japan, Borneo
- Chorsia aroa (Bethune-Baker, 1908) New Guinea, Seram
- Chorsia bellissima (Draudt, 1950) Yunnan
- Chorsia brewini Holloway, 2005 Borneo
- Chorsia carjacobsi Holloway, 2005 Borneo
- Chorsia colyeri Holloway, 2005 Borneo
- Chorsia costimacula (Oberthür, 1880) Askold, Korea, Japan
- Chorsia decolorata (Holloway, 1989) Borneo
- Chorsia dinglei Holloway, 2005 Borneo
- Chorsia greenleavesi Holloway, 2005 Borneo
- Chorsia griffini Holloway, 2005 Borneo
- Chorsia hemicyclopis (Hampson, 1926) Thailand, Borneo
- Chorsia hemmingi Holloway, 2005 Borneo
- Chorsia inordinata (Walker, [1863]) Borneo, India (Meghalaya)
- Chorsia japonica (Warren, 1912) Japan
- Chorsia kingi Holloway, 2005 Borneo
- Chorsia maculosa Walker, [1863] Borneo
- Chorsia mollicula (Graeser, [1889]) Amur, Korea, Japan
- Chorsia noloides (Butler, 1879) Korea, Japan, Taiwan
- Chorsia octosema (Hampson, 1926) Borneo
- Chorsia perversa (Walker, 1862) Borneo, Sri Lanka
- Chorsia picatum (Butler, 1892) Borneo
- Chorsia rectilinea (Ueda, 1987) Taiwan, Korea
- Chorsia rogersi Holloway, 2005 Borneo
- Chorsia rufitincta (Hampson, 1918) Borneo
- Chorsia sugii (Tanaka, 1973) Japan
- Chorsia trichocera (Hampson, 1926) Philippines (Luzon)
- Chorsia trigona (Hampson, 1891) southern India
- Chorsia williamsi Holloway, 2005 Borneo
