= Barybela =

Scientific classification
- Domain: Eukaryota
- Kingdom: Animalia
- Phylum: Arthropoda
- Class: Insecta
- Order: Lepidoptera
- Superfamily: Noctuoidea
- Family: Noctuidae
- Genus: Barybela; Turner, 1944

Genus of moths

Barybela is a genus of moths of the family Noctuidae.

== Species ==
- Barybela chionostigma Turner, 1944
