= Bryotype =

Scientific classification
- Kingdom: Animalia
- Phylum: Arthropoda
- Class: Insecta
- Order: Lepidoptera
- Superfamily: Noctuoidea
- Family: Noctuidae
- Subfamily: Cuculliinae
- Genus: Bryotype; Hampson, 1906

Genus of moths

Bryotype is a genus of moths of the family Noctuidae.

== Species ==
- Bryotype flavipicta (Hampson, 1894)
- Bryotype harmodina Draudt, 1950
- Bryotype mesomelana (Hampson, 1902)
