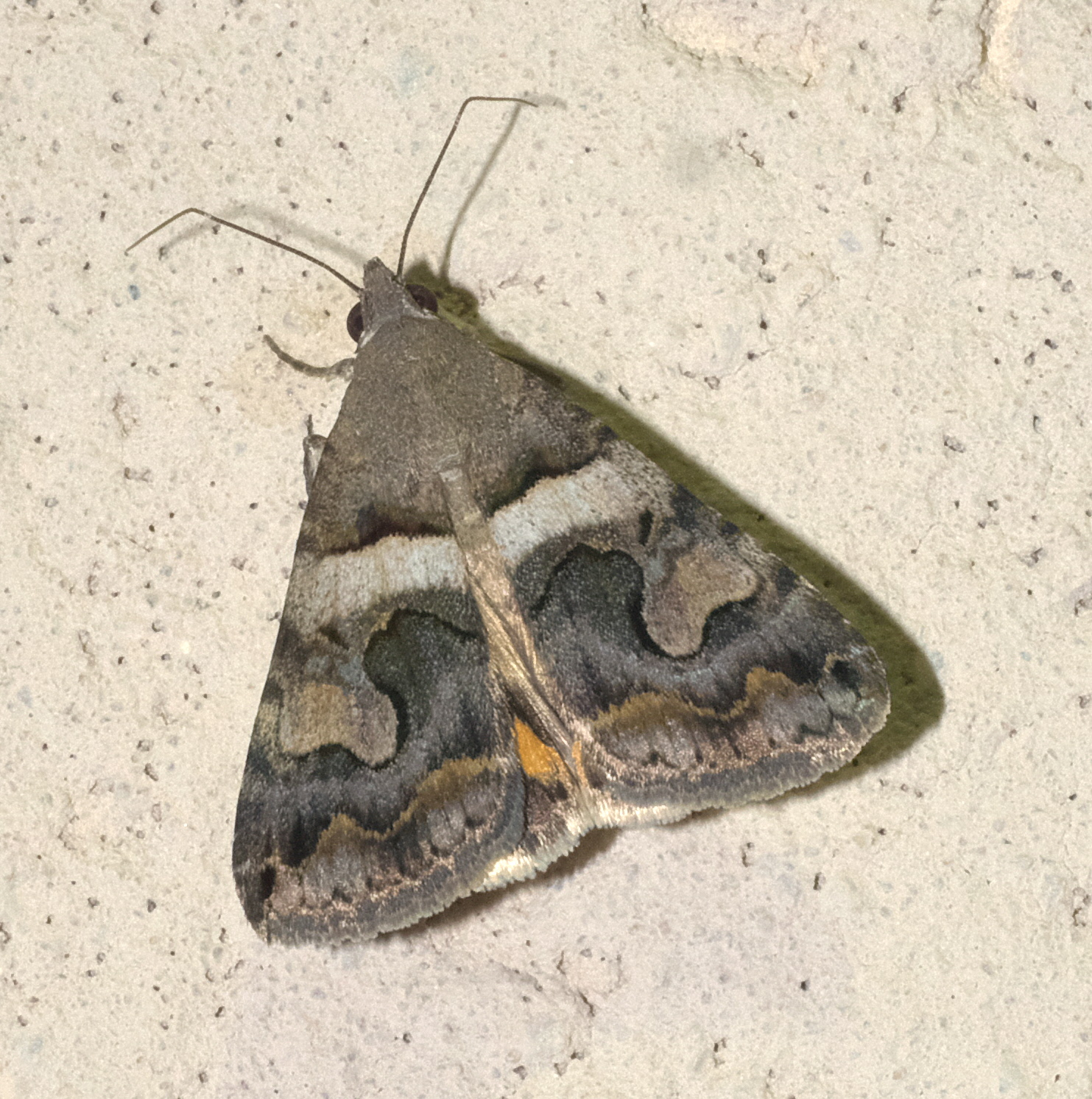
- Bulia deducta

Scientific classification
- Kingdom: Animalia
- Phylum: Arthropoda
- Class: Insecta
- Order: Lepidoptera
- Superfamily: Noctuoidea
- Family: Erebidae
- Tribe: Melipotini
- Genus: Bulia; Walker, 1858

Synonyms
- Arsisaca Walker, 1866; Biula Walker, 1858; Cirrhobolina Grote, 1875

= Bulia =

Genus of moths

Bulia is a genus of moths in the family Erebidae.

== Species ==
- Bulia brunnearis (Guenée, 1852)
- Bulia confirmans Walker, [1858]
- Bulia deducta Morrison, 1875
- Bulia mexicana Behr, 1870
- Bulia schausi Richards, 1936
- Bulia similaris Richards, 1936

== Former species ==
- Bulia bolinalis (Walker, 1866)
- Bulia morelosa Richards, 1941
