= Bleptiphora =

Scientific classification
- Domain: Eukaryota
- Kingdom: Animalia
- Phylum: Arthropoda
- Class: Insecta
- Order: Lepidoptera
- Superfamily: Noctuoidea
- Family: Erebidae
- Subfamily: Hypeninae
- Genus: Bleptiphora; Schaus, 1916

species
- B. laurentia

Genus of moths

Bleptiphora is a monotypic moth genus of the family Erebidae. Its only species, Bleptiphora laurentia, is known from French Guiana. Both the genus and the species were first described by William Schaus in 1916.
