= Via vindicia =

Scientific classification
- Kingdom: Animalia
- Phylum: Arthropoda
- Class: Insecta
- Order: Lepidoptera
- Superfamily: Noctuoidea
- Family: Noctuidae
- Genus: Via; Dyar, 1914
- Species: V. vindicia

Binomial name
- Via vindicia Dyar, 1914

Species of moth

Via is a monotypic moth genus of the family Noctuidae. Its only species, Via vindicia, is found in Panama. Both the genus and species were first described by Harrison Gray Dyar Jr. in 1914.
