= Bendisopis =

Scientific classification
- Kingdom: Animalia
- Phylum: Arthropoda
- Class: Insecta
- Order: Lepidoptera
- Superfamily: Noctuoidea
- Family: Erebidae
- Subfamily: Calpinae
- Genus: Bendisopis; Hampson, 1926
- Species: B. remissa

Binomial name
- Bendisopis remissa Walker, 1858

Genus of moths

Bendisopis is a monotypic moth genus of the family Erebidae erected by George Hampson in 1926. Its only species, Bendisopis remissa, was first described by Francis Walker in 1858. It is found in Venezuela.
