= Bamra (moth) =

Scientific classification
- Domain: Eukaryota
- Kingdom: Animalia
- Phylum: Arthropoda
- Class: Insecta
- Order: Lepidoptera
- Superfamily: Noctuoidea
- Family: Erebidae
- Subfamily: Calpinae
- Genus: Bamra; Moore, 1882

Synonyms
- Ostacronycta Bethune-Baker, 1911

Genus of moths

Bamra is a genus of moths of the family Noctuidae.

== Species ==
- Bamra albicola (Walker, 1858)
- Bamra cazeti (Mabille, 1893)
- Bamra delicata Hampson, 1922
- Bamra exclusa (Leech, 1889)
- Bamra glaucopasta (Bethune-Baker, 1911)
- Bamra jucunda Griveaud & Viette, 1961
- Bamra lepida (Moore, 1867)
- Bamra marmorifera (Walker, 1858)
- Bamra mundata (Walker, 1858)
