= Baecula =

Scientific classification
- Kingdom: Animalia
- Phylum: Arthropoda
- Class: Insecta
- Order: Lepidoptera
- Superfamily: Noctuoidea
- Family: Erebidae
- Subfamily: Calpinae
- Genus: Baecula; Walker, 1856
- Species: B. gallopavo

Binomial name
- Baecula gallopavo Walker, 1856

Synonyms
- Baecula cornifrons Felder, 1874; Baecula limbulata H. Druce

Genus of moths

Baecula is a monotypic moth genus of the family Erebidae. Its only species, Baecula gallopavo, is found in Venezuela. Both the genus and the species were first described by Francis Walker in 1859.

Butterflies and Moths of the World gives this name as a synonym of Lepidodes Guenée, 1852.
