= Quandara =

Scientific classification
- Kingdom: Animalia
- Phylum: Arthropoda
- Clade: Pancrustacea
- Class: Insecta
- Order: Lepidoptera
- Superfamily: Noctuoidea
- Family: Noctuidae
- Subfamily: Acontiinae
- Genus: Quandara; Nye, 1975
- Species: Q. hypozonata

Binomial name
- Quandara hypozonata (Hampson, 1910)

Synonyms
- Lycaugesia Hampson, 1912

Genus of moths

Quandara is a genus of moths in the family Noctuidae erected by Nye in 1975. It is monotypic, being represented by the single species, Quandara hypozonata, which was first described by George Hampson in 1910. It is found in Panama.
