= Berioana =

Scientific classification
- Kingdom: Animalia
- Phylum: Arthropoda
- Class: Insecta
- Order: Lepidoptera
- Superfamily: Noctuoidea
- Family: Noctuidae
- Genus: Berioana; D. S. Fletcher & Viette, 1962

Genus of moths

Berioana is a genus of moths in the family Noctuidae. It was described by David Stephen Fletcher and Pierre Viette in 1962.

== Species ==
- Berioana limbulata (Berio, 1955)
- Berioana pauliana Viette, 1963
