= Brachyxanthia =

Scientific classification
- Domain: Eukaryota
- Kingdom: Animalia
- Phylum: Arthropoda
- Class: Insecta
- Order: Lepidoptera
- Superfamily: Noctuoidea
- Family: Noctuidae
- Genus: Brachyxanthia; Butler, 1878

Genus of moths

Brachyxanthia is a genus of moths of the family Noctuidae.

== Species ==
- Brachyxanthia zelotypa (Lederer, 1853)
