= Biagicola =

Scientific classification
- Domain: Eukaryota
- Kingdom: Animalia
- Phylum: Arthropoda
- Class: Insecta
- Order: Lepidoptera
- Superfamily: Noctuoidea
- Family: Erebidae
- Subfamily: Calpinae
- Genus: Biagicola; Strand, 1914
- Species: B. signipennis

Binomial name
- Biagicola signipennis Strand, 1914

Genus of moths

Biagicola is a monotypic moth genus of the family Erebidae. Its only species, Biagicola signipennis, is found in New Guinea. Both the genus and the species were first described by Strand in 1914.
