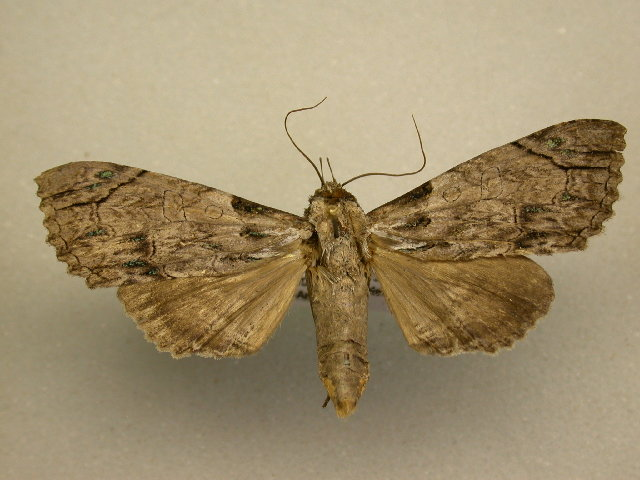
- Boryzops similis

Scientific classification
- Domain: Eukaryota
- Kingdom: Animalia
- Phylum: Arthropoda
- Class: Insecta
- Order: Lepidoptera
- Superfamily: Noctuoidea
- Family: Erebidae
- Tribe: Melipotini
- Genus: Boryzops; Richards, 1936

= Boryzops =

Genus of moths

Boryzops is a genus of moths in the family Erebidae.

== Species ==
- Boryzops purissima (Dyar, 1910)
- Boryzops similis (Druce, 1901)
- Boryzops torresi (Dognin, 1889)
