= Vescisa =

Scientific classification
- Kingdom: Animalia
- Phylum: Arthropoda
- Class: Insecta
- Order: Lepidoptera
- Superfamily: Noctuoidea
- Family: Noctuidae
- Subfamily: Acontiinae
- Genus: Vescisa; Walker, 1864

Genus of moths

Vescisa is a genus of moths in the family Noctuidae. The genus was erected by Francis Walker in 1864.

The Global Lepidoptera Names Index gives this name as a synonym of Eublemma Hübner, 1829.

== Species ==
- Vescisa commoda Walker, 1864
- Vescisa crenulata Hampson, 1896
- Vescisa digona Hampson, 1910
- Vescisa pervadens Warren, 1914
