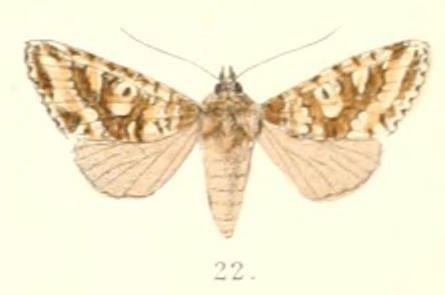
- Bryotypella leucosticta

Scientific classification
- Domain: Eukaryota
- Kingdom: Animalia
- Phylum: Arthropoda
- Class: Insecta
- Order: Lepidoptera
- Superfamily: Noctuoidea
- Family: Noctuidae
- Subfamily: Xyleninae
- Genus: Bryotypella; Hreblay & Ronkay, 1998

= Bryotypella =

Genus of moths

Bryotypella is a genus of moths of the family Noctuidae.

== Species ==
- Bryotypella leucosticta (Moore, 1882)
