= Ypsora =

Scientific classification
- Domain: Eukaryota
- Kingdom: Animalia
- Phylum: Arthropoda
- Class: Insecta
- Order: Lepidoptera
- Superfamily: Noctuoidea
- Family: Erebidae
- Subfamily: Calpinae
- Genus: Ypsora; Schaus, 1901

Genus of moths

Ypsora is a genus of moths of the family Noctuidae.

== Species ==
- Ypsora homochroa (Dognin, 1914)
- Ypsora lepraota Hampson, 1926
- Ypsora santaris Schaus, 1901
- Ypsora selenodes Hampson, 1926
- Ypsora violascens Draudt and Gaede, 1944
