= Burdettia =

Scientific classification
- Domain: Eukaryota
- Kingdom: Animalia
- Phylum: Arthropoda
- Class: Insecta
- Order: Lepidoptera
- Superfamily: Noctuoidea
- Family: Erebidae
- Subfamily: Calpinae
- Genus: Burdettia; Schaus, 1916

Genus of moths

Burdettia is a genus of moths of the family Noctuidae.

== Species ==
- Burdettia braziliensis (Schaus, 1904)
- Burdettia lignealisoides Poole, 1989
- Burdettia rivalis (Schaus, 1904)
