= Bostrycharia =

Scientific classification
- Domain: Eukaryota
- Kingdom: Animalia
- Phylum: Arthropoda
- Class: Insecta
- Order: Lepidoptera
- Superfamily: Noctuoidea
- Family: Erebidae
- Subfamily: Hypeninae
- Genus: Bostrycharia; Schaus, 1916
- Species: B. cuprea

Binomial name
- Bostrycharia cuprea (Schaus, 1906)

Genus of moths

Bostrycharia is a monotypic moth genus of the family Erebidae. Its only species, Bostrycharia cuprea, is known from the Brazilian state of São Paulo. Both the genus and the species were first described by William Schaus, the genus in 1916 and the species ten years earlier in 1906.
