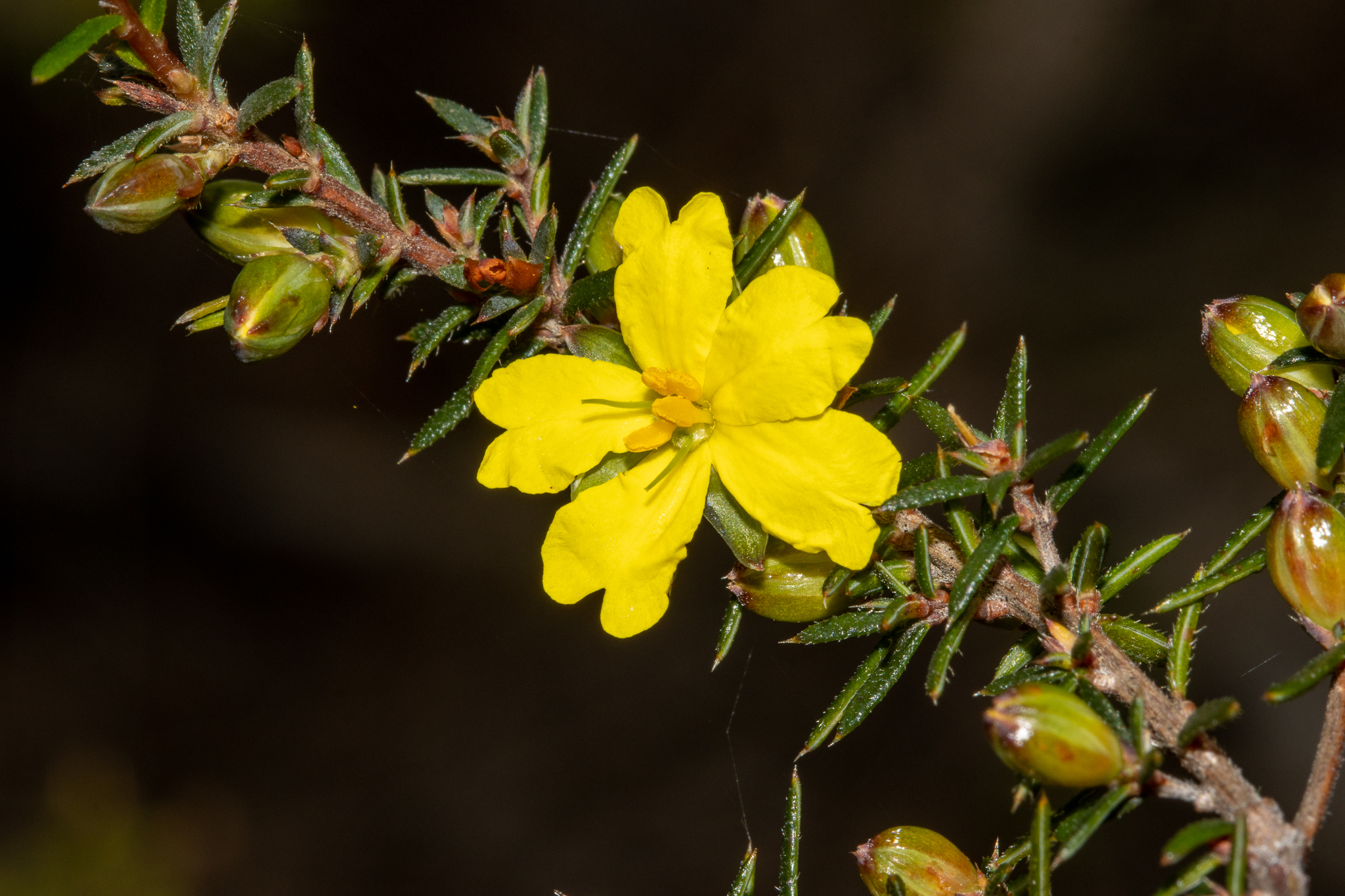
- In Mount Remarkable National Park

Scientific classification
- Kingdom: Plantae
- Clade: Tracheophytes
- Clade: Angiosperms
- Clade: Eudicots
- Order: Dilleniales
- Family: Dilleniaceae
- Genus: Hibbertia
- Species: H. exutiacies

Binomial name
- Hibbertia exutiacies N.A.Wakef.

Synonyms
- Hibbertia acicularis var. sessiliflora J.M.Black; Hibbertia acicularis auct. non (Labill.) F.Muell.: Tate, R. (1890)

= Hibbertia exutiacies =

Species of flowering plant

Hibbertia exutiacies is a species of flowering plant in the family Dilleniaceae and is endemic to Australia. It is a small, spreading to low-lying shrub with linear leaves that are triangular in cross-section, and yellow flowers with four to eight stamens arranged in a single cluster on one side of the two carpels.

== Description ==
Hibbertia exutiacies is a spreading to low-lying shrub that typically grows to a height of 40 cm (16 in), its foliage hairy when young. The leaves are linear, triangular in cross-section, 2.2–10.4 mm (0.087–0.409 in) long and 0.6–1.3 mm (0.024–0.051 in) wide on a petiole up to 0.4 mm (0.016 in) long. The flowers are arranged singly on the ends of short side-shoots and are sessile, with three or four triangular bracts 0.6–1.2 mm (0.024–0.047 in) long. The sepals are joined at the base, 5–6 mm (0.20–0.24 in) long and the petals are yellow, egg-shaped with the narrower end towards the base, 3.6–8.4 mm (0.14–0.33 in) long with a notch at the tip. There are four to eight stamens in a single cluster on one side of the two hairy carpels, each with four ovules.

== Taxonomy ==
Hibbertia exutiacies was first formally described in 1955 by Norman Arthur Wakefield in The Victorian Naturalist from specimens collected by St. Eloy D'Alton.

== Distribution and habitat ==
This hibbertia grows in woodland, usually in gravelly soil and occurs in central Victoria, south-eastern South Australia and parts of Queensland.

== Conservation status ==
Hibbertia exutiacies is classified as of "least concern" under the Queensland Government Nature Conservation Act 1992.
