= Bihymena =

Scientific classification
- Domain: Eukaryota
- Kingdom: Animalia
- Phylum: Arthropoda
- Class: Insecta
- Order: Lepidoptera
- Superfamily: Noctuoidea
- Family: Noctuidae (?)
- Subfamily: Catocalinae
- Genus: Bihymena; Beck, 1996
- Species: B. hymenaea

Binomial name
- Bihymena hymenaea Schiffermüller, 1775

Genus of moths

Bihymena is a monotypic moth genus of the family Noctuidae erected by Herbert Beck in 1996. Its only species, Bihymena hymenaea, was first described by Ignaz Schiffermüller in 1775.
