= List of noctuid genera: I =

The huge moth family Noctuidae contains the following genera:

A B C D E F G H I J K L M N O P Q R S T U V W X Y Z

- Iambia
- Iambiodes
- Ianius
- Ichneutica
- Ichthyopselapha
- Idalima
- Idia
- Idicara
- Ikondiana
- Ilarus
- Ilattia
- Ilsea
- Iluza
- Ilyrgis
- Ilyrgodes
- Imitator
- Imleanga
- Immetalia
- Imosca
- Inabaia
- Incita
- Indocala
- Ingura
- Inguridia
- Insolentipalpus
- Interdelta
- Internoctua
- Iodopepla
- Iontha
- Ipanephis
- Ipanica
- Ipermarca
- Ipimorpha
- Ipiristis
- Ipnea
- Ipnista
- Iranada
- Isadelphina
- Isana
- Isatoolna
- Ischyja
- Isochlora
- Isogona
- Isolasia
- Isopolia
- Isoura
- Istarba
- Itmaharela
- Itomia
