= List of noctuid genera: U =

The huge moth family Noctuidae contains the following genera:

A B C D E F G H I J K L M N O P Q R S T U V W X Y Z

- Ufeus
- Ugana
- Ugia
- Ugiodes
- Ulochlaena
- Ulolonche
- Ulosyneda
- Ulotrichopus
- Uncula
- Uniptena
- Uniramodes
- Uollega
- Upothenia
- Uracontia
- Uripao
- Ursogastra
- Usbeca
- Uzinia
- Uzomathis
