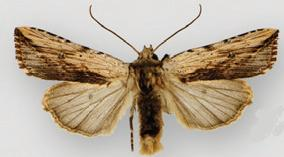
- Trichorthosia diplogramma

Scientific classification
- Kingdom: Animalia
- Phylum: Arthropoda
- Class: Insecta
- Order: Lepidoptera
- Superfamily: Noctuoidea
- Family: Noctuidae
- Genus: Trichorthosia; Grote, 1883

= Trichorthosia =

Genus of moths

Trichorthosia was a genus of moths of the family Noctuidae, it is now considered a synonym of Hypotrix.

== Former species ==
- Trichorthosia aselenograpta Dyar, 1916
- Trichorthosia cirphidia (Draudt, 1924)
- Trichorthosia clarcana Dyar, 1916
- Trichorthosia diapera (Hampson, 1913)
- Trichorthosia diplogramma (Schaus, 1903)
- Trichorthosia duplicilinea (Dognin, 1908)
- Trichorthosia euryte (Druce, 1898)
- Trichorthosia ferricola (Smith, 1903)
- Trichorthosia niveilinea (Schaus, 1894)
- Trichorthosia parallela Grote, 1883
- Trichorthosia tristis is now Anhypotrix tristis (Barnes & McDunnough, 1910)
- Trichorthosia umbrifer (Dyar, 1916)
