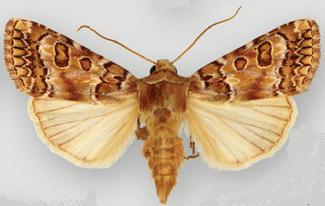

Scientific classification
- Kingdom: Animalia
- Phylum: Arthropoda
- Class: Insecta
- Order: Lepidoptera
- Superfamily: Noctuoidea
- Family: Noctuidae
- Tribe: Eriopygini
- Genus: Hexorthodes; McDunnough, 1943

= Hexorthodes =

Genus of moths

Hexorthodes is a genus of moths of the family Noctuidae.

== Species ==
- Hexorthodes accurata (H. Edwards, 1882)
- Hexorthodes agrotiformis (Grote, 1881) (syn: Hexorthodes planalis (Grote, 1883), Hexorthodes diplopis (Dyar, 1914), Hexorthodes aleuca (Draudt, 1924))
- Hexorthodes catalina (Barnes & McDunnough, 1912)
- Hexorthodes citeria Blanchard & Knudson, 1985
- Hexorthodes emendata Blanchard & Knudson, 1985
- Hexorthodes inconspicua (Grote, 1883)
- Hexorthodes jocosa (Barnes & McDunnough, 1916)
- Hexorthodes nipana (Smith, 1910) (syn: Hexorthodes montara (Smith, 1910))
- Hexorthodes oriza (Druce, 1889)
- Hexorthodes senatoria (Smith, 1900)
- Hexorthodes serrata (Smith, 1900)
- Hexorthodes tuana (Smith, 1906)

== Former species ==
- Hexorthodes alamosa is now Hypotrix alamosa (Barnes, 1904)
- Hexorthodes hueco is now Hypotrix hueco (Barnes, 1904)
- Hexorthodes optima is now Hypotrix optima (Dyar, [1920])
- Hexorthodes trifascia is now Hypotrix trifascia (Smith, 1891)
