= H. rubra =

H. rubra may refer to:

- Haliotis rubra, the blacklip abalone, a large edible sea snail species
- Halocaridina rubra, the ōpae ula in Hawaiian, a small shrimp species
- Hypotrix rubra, a moth species found from south-western New Mexico and south-eastern Arizona
- Hyunsoonleella rubra, a marine bacterium
