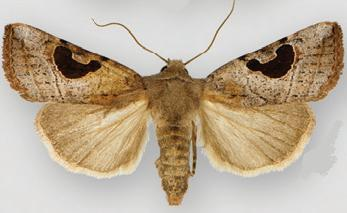

Scientific classification
- Kingdom: Animalia
- Phylum: Arthropoda
- Clade: Pancrustacea
- Class: Insecta
- Order: Lepidoptera
- Superfamily: Noctuoidea
- Family: Noctuidae
- Genus: Hypotrix
- Species: H. lunata

Binomial name
- Hypotrix lunata (Smith, 1906)

Synonyms
- Urasogastra lunata Smith, 1906

= Hypotrix lunata =

Species of moth

Hypotrix lunata is a moth of the family Noctuidae. It is found in the range of Arizona to northern Mexico.

The length of the forewings is 15–17 mm and the wingspan is about 31 mm.

== Description ==
It is a relatively large moth that is superficially unlike any other species in North America. It is most closely related to Hypotrix quindiensis (Draudt, 1924) that was originally described as a form of H. lunata; it occurs from Colombia to Peru. Hypotrix lunata differs from H. quindiensis in having a smaller orbicular spot (the two sides of the black mark formed by the fusion of the spots are similar in size in H. quindiensis), the postmedial line is an even black line (an irregular series of black dashes in H. quindiensis ending in a black spot on the costa), the basal line is obscure (a contrasting black spot in H. quindiensis) and the hindwing is fuscous, not dirty white. In the genitalia of H. quindiensis there are two rather than three coils in the vesica and appendix bursae and only the posterior half of the ductus bursae is sclerotized. Hypotrix purpurigera and several of its South American relatives also have black reniform and orbicular spots that are frequently fused posteriorly, creating a wide V-shaped mark. Within the North American fauna the male genitalia of Hypotrix lunata are most similar to those of Hypotrix hueco, but differ in that only the apical part of the uncus is expanded in H. lunata whereas the apical 2/3 is wide in H. hueco, the clasper is stouter and abruptly tapered apically in H. lunata, and the dorsal lobe on the sacculus is much larger. The vesica is very different from that of H. hueco in having much more extensive basal cluster of spines and subbasal cornuti in a longitudinally ribbed basal swelling, and the vesica has three tight medial coils rather than one as in H. hueco. In the female genitalia the appendix bursae has a corresponding three coils to those in the vesica and the ductus bursae is more heavily sclerotized.
