= Hyunsoonleella =

Scientific classification
- Domain: Bacteria
- Kingdom: Pseudomonadati
- Phylum: Bacteroidota
- Class: Flavobacteriia
- Order: Flavobacteriales
- Family: Flavobacteriaceae
- Genus: Hyunsoonleella; Yoon et al. 2010

Type species
- Hyunsoonleella jejuensis

Species
- H. aestuarii H. aquatilis H. flava H. jejuensis H. pacifica H. pallidilutea H. rubra H. udoensis

Genus of bacteria

Hyunsoonleella is a genus of gram-negative bacteria from the family of Flavobacteriaceae.
