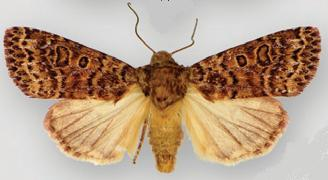
- Hypotrix alamosa

Scientific classification
- Kingdom: Animalia
- Phylum: Arthropoda
- Class: Insecta
- Order: Lepidoptera
- Superfamily: Noctuoidea
- Family: Noctuidae
- Subfamily: Hadeninae
- Genus: Hypotrix; Guenée

Synonyms
- Proteinania Hampson, 1905; Trichagrotis McDunnough, [1929]; Trichorthosia Grote, 1883; Ursogastra Smith, 1906

= Hypotrix =

Genus of moths

Hypotrix is a genus of moths of the family Noctuidae.

== Taxon ==
The genus Hypotrix (Guenée, 1852) originally included 23 species from southern Mexico to Brazil and Peru. In 2010, based on genital character and novel genetic information, 11 species of Trichorthosia (Grote, 1883), one species of Trichagrotis (McDunnough 1929), and four species from Hexorthodes (McDunnough, 1929) were brought in to form the revised genus Hypotrix.

== Diagnotics ==
In females, the most prominent diagnostic character for the genus is the form of the anal papillae, which is "swollen and bulbous basally, then abruptly tapered to a narrow pointed apex". In preserved specimens, this papillae often curves below the end of the abdomen to project anteriorly, sometimes by as much as 180 degrees.

The most notable diagnostic for males is the "membranous flap arising from the middle of the sacculus and partially overtopping the sclerotized part of the sacculus"- particularly the masses of long scales on the pleural membrane, which is specific to this genus.

== Species ==
- Hypotrix alamosa (Barnes, 1904)
- Hypotrix aselenograpta Dyar, 1916
- Hypotrix basistriga Lafontaine, Ferris & Walsh, 2010
- Hypotrix carneigera Guenée, 1852
- Hypotrix cirphidia (Draudt, 1924)
- Hypotrix clarcana Dyar, 1916
- Hypotrix diapera (Hampson, 1913)
- Hypotrix diplogramma (Schaus, 1903)
- Hypotrix duplicilinea (Dognin, 1908)
- Hypotrix euryte (Druce, 1898)
- Hypotrix ferricola (Smith, 1903)
- Hypotrix flavigera Guenée, 1852
- Hypotrix hueco (Barnes, 1904)
- Hypotrix lunata Smith, 1906
- Hypotrix naglei Lafontaine, Ferris & Walsh, 2010
- Hypotrix niveilinea (Schaus, 1894)
- Hypotrix ocularis Lafontaine, Ferris & Walsh, 2010
- Hypotrix optima (Dyar, [1920])
- Hypotrix parallela Grote, 1883
- Hypotrix proxima (Draudt, 1924)
- Hypotrix purpurigera Guenée, 1852
- Hypotrix quindiensis (Draudt, 1924)
- Hypotrix rubra Lafontaine, Ferris & Walsh, 2010
- Hypotrix sedecens (Schaus, 1903)
- Hypotrix spinosa (Barnes & McDunnough, 1912)
- Hypotrix trifascia (Smith, 1891)
- Hypotrix umbrifer (Dyar, 1916)
- Hypotrix vigasia (Schaus, 1894)
