= Hexorthodes accurata =

Scientific classification
- Domain: Eukaryota
- Kingdom: Animalia
- Phylum: Arthropoda
- Class: Insecta
- Order: Lepidoptera
- Superfamily: Noctuoidea
- Family: Noctuidae
- Tribe: Eriopygini
- Genus: Hexorthodes
- Species: H. accurata

Binomial name
- Hexorthodes accurata (H. Edwards, 1882)

Species of moth

Hexorthodes accurata is a species of cutworm or dart moth in the family Noctuidae. It is found in North America.

The MONA or Hodges number for Hexorthodes accurata is 10601.
