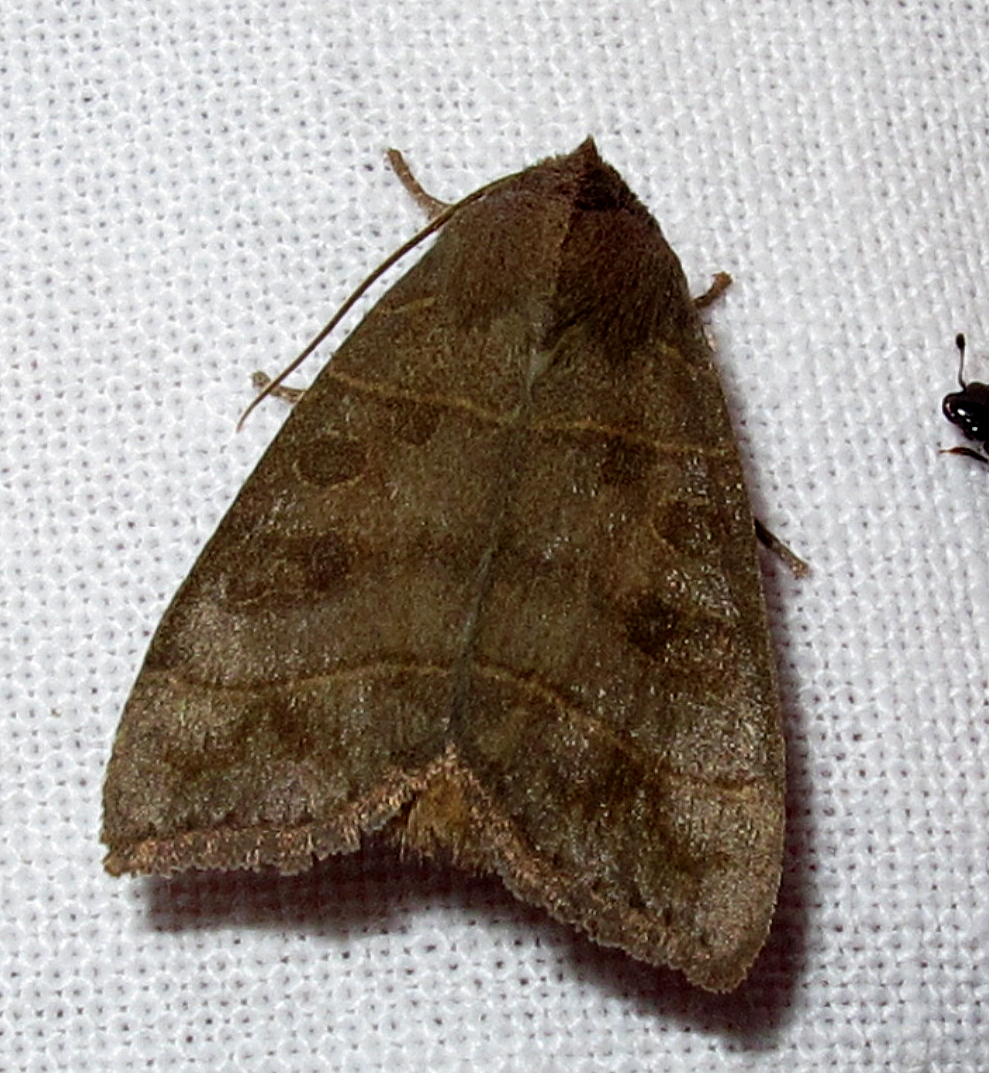
- Even-lined Sallow Ipimorpha pleonectusa, Wheatley, Ontario, Canada

Scientific classification
- Kingdom: Animalia
- Phylum: Arthropoda
- Clade: Pancrustacea
- Class: Insecta
- Order: Lepidoptera
- Superfamily: Noctuoidea
- Family: Noctuidae
- Genus: Ipimorpha
- Species: I. pleonectusa

Binomial name
- Ipimorpha pleonectusa Grote, 1873

Synonyms
- Ipimorpha subvexa Grote, 1876

= Ipimorpha pleonectusa =

Species of moth

Ipimorpha pleonectusa, commonly known as the even-lined sallow or blackcheeked aspen caterpillar, is a species of cutworm or dart moth in the family Noctuidae. It is found in North America.
