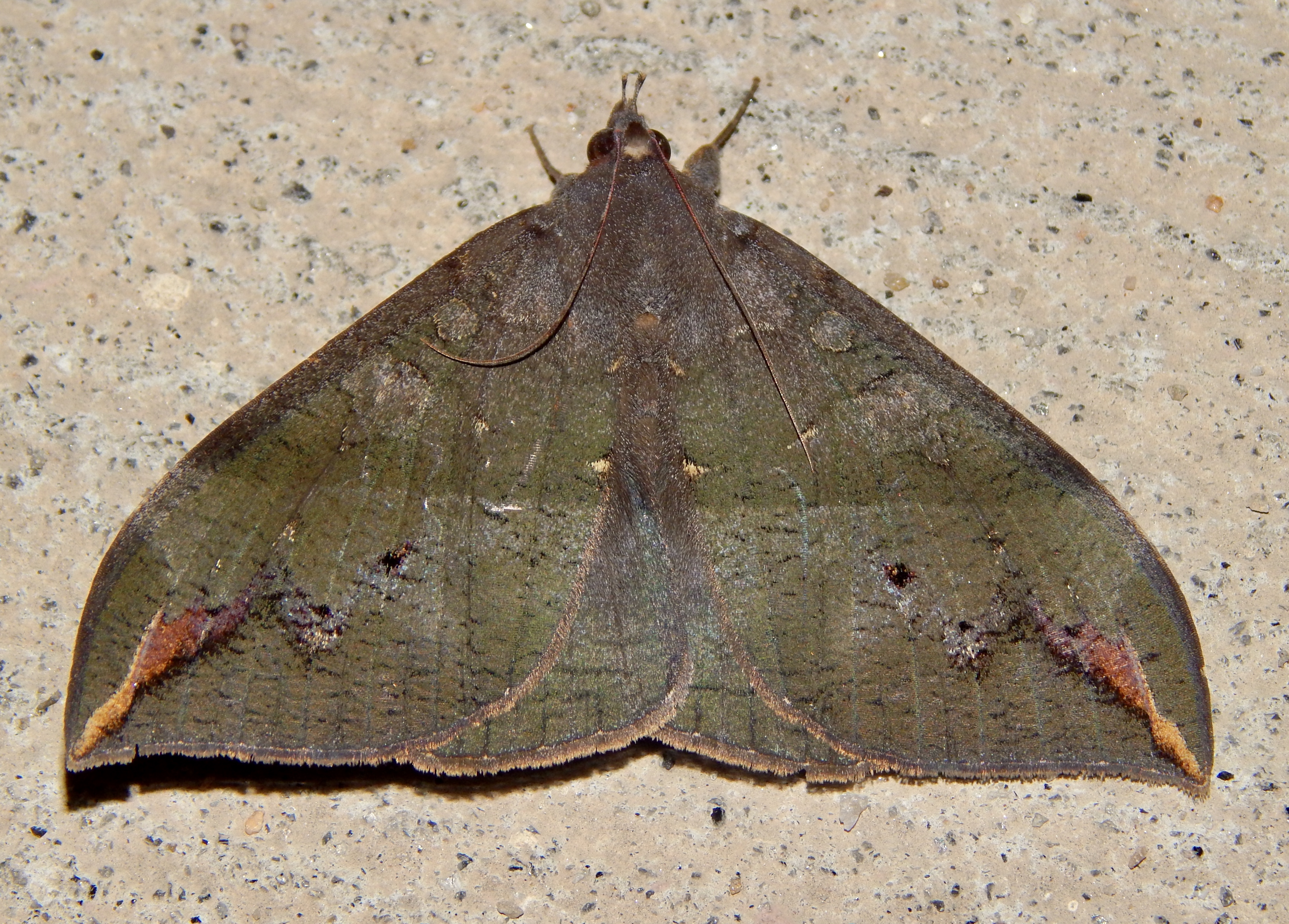

Scientific classification
- Kingdom: Animalia
- Phylum: Arthropoda
- Class: Insecta
- Order: Lepidoptera
- Superfamily: Noctuoidea
- Family: Noctuidae (?)
- Genus: Ischyja
- Species: I. ferrifracta

Binomial name
- Ischyja ferrifracta (Walker, 1864)

Synonyms
- Potamophora schlegelii Snellen, 1884; Ischyja glaucopteron Hampson, 1891

= Ischyja ferrifracta =

Species of moth

Ischyja ferrifracta is a species of moth of the family Noctuidae first described by Francis Walker in 1864.

It has been recorded from Borneo, Peninsular Malaysia, India, Java, Lombok, Dammer, Thailand (VK), Hainan and Japan.
