= Proteinania =

Scientific classification
- Kingdom: Animalia
- Phylum: Arthropoda
- Class: Insecta
- Order: Lepidoptera
- Superfamily: Noctuoidea
- Family: Noctuidae
- Genus: Proteinania; Hampson, 1905

Genus of moths

Proteinania was a genus of moths of the family Noctuidae; it is now considered to be a synonym of Hypotrix.
