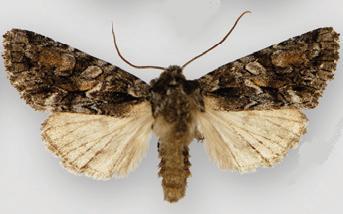

Scientific classification
- Domain: Eukaryota
- Kingdom: Animalia
- Phylum: Arthropoda
- Class: Insecta
- Order: Lepidoptera
- Superfamily: Noctuoidea
- Family: Noctuidae
- Subfamily: Noctuinae
- Genus: Anhypotrix; Lafontaine, Ferris, and Walsh, 2010

= Anhypotrix =

Genus of moths

Anhypotrix is a genus of moths of the family Noctuidae.

== Species ==
- Anhypotrix tristis (Barnes & McDunnough, 1910)
