= Algibacter onchidii =

Scientific classification
- Domain: Bacteria
- Kingdom: Pseudomonadati
- Phylum: Bacteroidota
- Class: Flavobacteriia
- Order: Flavobacteriales
- Family: Flavobacteriaceae
- Genus: Algibacter
- Species: A. onchidii

Binomial name
- Algibacter onchidii Yin et al. 2021

Type strain
- XY-114

Species of bacterium

Algibacter onchidii is a Gram-negative, rod-shaped, aerobic and non-motile bacterium from the genus Algibacter which has been isolated from a Onchidium species from the South China Sea.
