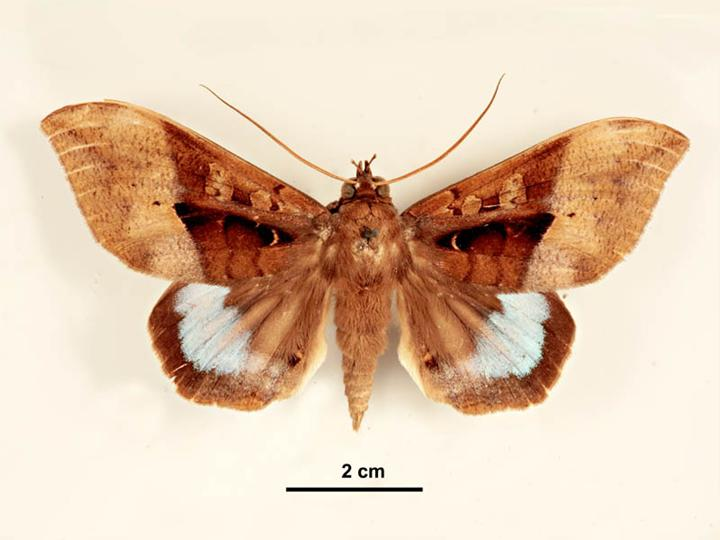
- Female
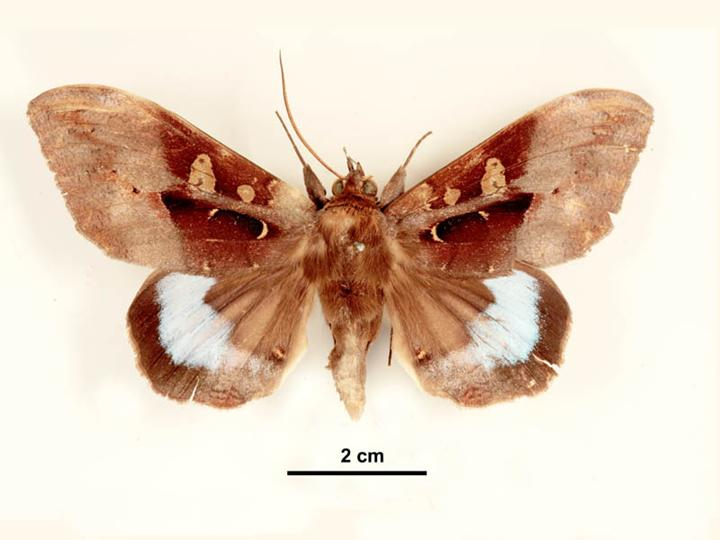
- Male

Scientific classification
- Domain: Eukaryota
- Kingdom: Animalia
- Phylum: Arthropoda
- Class: Insecta
- Order: Lepidoptera
- Superfamily: Noctuoidea
- Family: Noctuidae (?)
- Genus: Ischyja
- Species: I. manlia

Binomial name
- Ischyja manlia (Cramer, 1776)

Synonyms
- Phalaena manlia Cramer, [1776]; Noctua squalida Fabricius, 1787; Potamophora amboinensis C. Felder, 1862

= Ischyja manlia =

Species of moth

Ischyja manlia is a species of moth of the family Noctuidae first described by Pieter Cramer in 1776. It is found in the Indian subregion, Sri Lanka, Myanmar, Thailand, China, Okinawa, Sundaland, Sulawesi, Korea, the southern Moluccas, Australia (Queensland) and Palau.

== Description ==
The wingspan of the male ranges from 80 to 100 mm and female with 96–112 mm. In the male, the head and thorax are red brown. Abdomen fuscous or red brown. A white spot is found at the base of the hind tibia and others on the outer spur of midlegs and outer medial spur of hindlegs. Forewings pale or dark red brown or olive brown, irrorated (sprinkled) with dark specks. There are traces of antemedial and medial waved lines. A straight oblique postmedial line found. Orbicular and reniform greyish or ochreous, or in the form of deep black quadrate spots with white edges. Black spots can be seen below center and end of cell generally present, with a white lunule on it and conjoined by a streak. There is a large ochreous patch found sometimes present from lower end of cell to inner margin. An obscure waved sub-marginal line commencing as an oblique streak from the apex. Hindwings very dark red brown. The area near anal angle greyish with dark strigae. A broad, irregularly angled, purplish-blue medial band runs from costa to vein 2. A black spot with pale streak can be seen on it above anal angle. Ventral side of forewing with white irregular postmedial band from the costa to vein 2. Hindwings with dentate postmedial line present.

In the female, the forewings are much uniform in colour and without the black patches. The oblique line is prominent. Hindwings with broad and more regular band. No mark can be seen above the anal angle. The colour often very dark.

Larvae are purplish brown and ochreous, irregularly marked with short black streaks. Their head is ochreous with brown speckles. The 4th to 6th and then 10th and 11th somites with short dorsal conical prominences. Pupa efflorescent.

== Subspecies ==
- Ischyja manlia manlia
- Ischyja manlia amboinensis Felder, 1861 (southern Moluccas)
