= Algibacter agarilyticus =

Scientific classification
- Domain: Bacteria
- Kingdom: Pseudomonadati
- Phylum: Bacteroidota
- Class: Flavobacteriia
- Order: Flavobacteriales
- Family: Flavobacteriaceae
- Genus: Algibacter
- Species: A. agarilyticus

Binomial name
- Algibacter agarilyticus Park et al. 2013

Type strain
- KYW563

Synonyms
- Algibacter agarolyticus Flaviramulus marinus

Species of bacterium

Algibacter agarilyticus is a Gram-negative, rod-shaped, aerobic and non-motile bacterium from the genus Algibacter which has been isolated from seawater from the Gwangyang Bay.
