= Ilyrgis echephurealis =

Scientific classification
- Kingdom: Animalia
- Phylum: Arthropoda
- Clade: Pancrustacea
- Class: Insecta
- Order: Lepidoptera
- Superfamily: Noctuoidea
- Family: Erebidae
- Genus: Ilyrgis
- Species: I. echephurealis

Binomial name
- Ilyrgis echephurealis Walker, 1859

Species of moth

Ilyrgis echephurealis is a moth of the family Noctuidae first described by Francis Walker in 1859. It is found in Sri Lanka, Hainan, Peninsular Malaysia and Borneo. Forewings are bifalcate and uniformly pale mauve grey, with very fine, pale, irregular fasciae that become slightly more definite at the costa.
