= Algibacter mikhailovii =

Scientific classification
- Domain: Bacteria
- Kingdom: Pseudomonadati
- Phylum: Bacteroidota
- Class: Flavobacteriia
- Order: Flavobacteriales
- Family: Flavobacteriaceae
- Genus: Algibacter
- Species: A. mikhailovii

Binomial name
- Algibacter mikhailovii Nedashkovskaya et al. 2007

Type strain
- KMM 6171

Species of bacterium

Algibacter mikhailovii is a Gram-negative, heterotrophic and motile bacterium from the genus Algibacter.
