= Iodopepla u-album =

White-eyed borer moth

Scientific classification
- Kingdom: Animalia
- Phylum: Arthropoda
- Clade: Pancrustacea
- Class: Insecta
- Order: Lepidoptera
- Superfamily: Noctuoidea
- Family: Noctuidae
- Tribe: Actinotiini
- Genus: Iodopepla
- Species: I. u-album

Binomial name
- Iodopepla u-album (Guenée, 1852)

Species of moth

Iodopepla u-album, the white-eyed borer moth, is a species of cutworm or dart moth in the family Noctuidae.

The MONA or Hodges number for Iodopepla u-album is 9522.
