= Algibacter pacificus =

Scientific classification
- Domain: Bacteria
- Kingdom: Pseudomonadati
- Phylum: Bacteroidota
- Class: Flavobacteriia
- Order: Flavobacteriales
- Family: Flavobacteriaceae
- Genus: Algibacter
- Species: A. pacificus

Binomial name
- Algibacter pacificus Liu et al. 2020

Type strain
- H164

Species of bacterium

Algibacter pacificus is a Gram-negative, rod-shaped and facultative anaerobic bacterium from the genus Algibacter which has been isolated from the Caroline Seamounts from the Pacific Ocean.
