= Hyunsoonleella pacifica =

Scientific classification
- Domain: Bacteria
- Kingdom: Pseudomonadati
- Phylum: Bacteroidota
- Class: Flavobacteriia
- Order: Flavobacteriales
- Family: Flavobacteriaceae
- Genus: Hyunsoonleella
- Species: H. pacifica

Binomial name
- Hyunsoonleella pacifica Gao et al. 2015

Type strain
- SW033

Species of bacterium

Hyunsoonleella pacifica is a Gram-negative, strictly aerobic and non-motile bacterium from the genus of Hyunsoonleella which has been isolated from seawater from the South Pacific Gyre.
