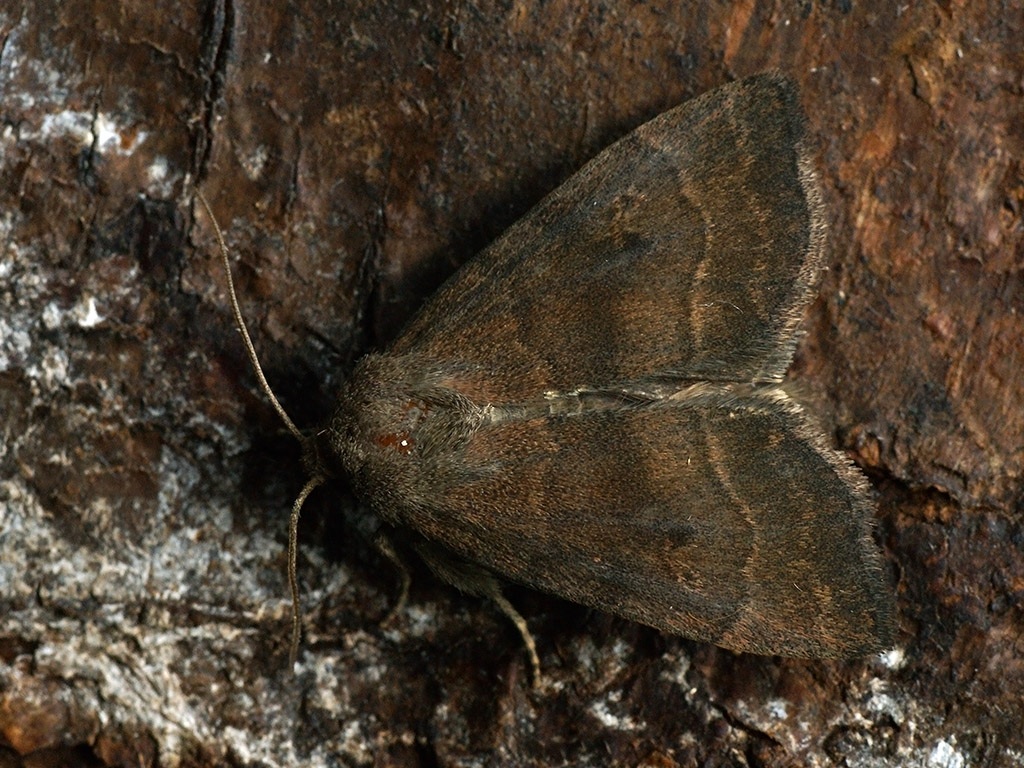

Scientific classification
- Domain: Eukaryota
- Kingdom: Animalia
- Phylum: Arthropoda
- Class: Insecta
- Order: Lepidoptera
- Superfamily: Noctuoidea
- Family: Noctuidae
- Genus: Ipimorpha
- Species: I. contusa

Binomial name
- Ipimorpha contusa (Freyer, 1849)

= Ipimorpha contusa =

Species of moth

Ipimorpha contusa is a moth belonging to the family Noctuidae. The species was first described by Christian Friedrich Freyer in 1849.

It is native to Eurasia.
