= Algibacter psychrophilus =

Scientific classification
- Domain: Bacteria
- Kingdom: Pseudomonadati
- Phylum: Bacteroidota
- Class: Flavobacteriia
- Order: Flavobacteriales
- Family: Flavobacteriaceae
- Genus: Algibacter
- Species: A. psychrophilus

Binomial name
- Algibacter psychrophilus Jung et al. 2015

Type strain
- PAMC 27237

Species of bacterium

Algibacter psychrophilus is a Gram-negative, rod-shaped, aerobic, psychrophilic and non-motile bacterium from the genus of Algibacter which has been isolated from sediments from the Ross Sea.
