= Algibacter =

Scientific classification
- Domain: Bacteria
- Kingdom: Pseudomonadati
- Phylum: Bacteroidota
- Class: Flavobacteriia
- Order: Flavobacteriales
- Family: Flavobacteriaceae
- Genus: Algibacter; Nedashkovskaya et al. 2004

Type species
- Algibacter lectus Nedashkovskaya et al. 2004

Genus of bacteria

Algibacter is a genus in the phylum Bacteroidota (Bacteria).

== Etymology ==
The name Algibacter derives from:
Latin feminine gender noun alga, seaweed; Neo-Latin masculine gender noun, a rodbacter, nominally meaning "a rod", but in effect meaning a bacterium, rod; Neo-Latin masculine gender noun Algibacter, rod isolated from seaweed.

== Species ==
The genus contains 15 species (including basonyms and synonyms), namely

- Algibacter aestuarii
- Algibacter agarilyticus
- Algibacter agarivorans
- Algibacter alginicilyticus
- Algibacter amylolyticus
- Algibacter aquimarinus
- Algibacter lectus (Nedashkovskaya et al. 2004, (Type species of the genus).; Latin masculine gender adjective lectus, chosen, selected, referring to a bacterium that forms select, beautiful colonies.)
- Algibacter marinivivus
- Algibacter mikhailovii (Nedashkovskaya et al. 2007; Neo-Latin masculine gender genitive case noun mikhailovii, of Mikhailov, in honour of Valery V. Mikhailov, a Russian microbiologist, for his contributions to the development of marine microbiology.)
- Algibacter miyuki
- Algibacter onchidii
- Algibacter pacificus
- Algibacter pectinivorans
- Algibacter psychrophilus
- Algibacter undariae
