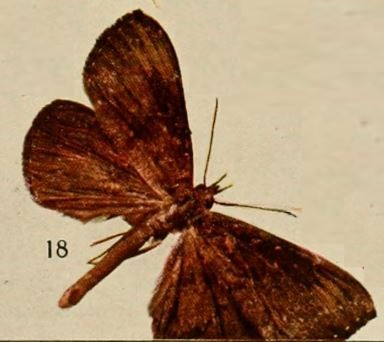
- Aburina morosa

Scientific classification
- Domain: Eukaryota
- Kingdom: Animalia
- Phylum: Arthropoda
- Class: Insecta
- Order: Lepidoptera
- Superfamily: Noctuoidea
- Family: Erebidae
- Subfamily: Calpinae
- Genus: Aburina; Möschler, 1887

Synonyms
- Ugana Swinhoe, 1909

= Aburina =

Genus of erebid moths

Aburina is a genus of moths of the family Erebidae.

== Species ==
- Aburina chrysa Gaede, 1940
- Aburina coerulescens Hampson, 1926
- Aburina dufayi Viette, 1979
- Aburina electa Karsch, 1896
- Aburina endoxantha Hampson, 1926
- Aburina exangulata Gaede, 1940
- Aburina jucunda Karsch, 1896
- Aburina leucocharagma Hampson, 1926
- Aburina marmorata Berio, 1974
- Aburina morosa (Holland, 1920) (syn: Aburina pallidior (Holland, 1920))
- Aburina multilineata (Holland, 1920)
- Aburina peyrierasi Viette, 1979
- Aburina phoenocrosmena Hampson, 1926
- Aburina poliophaea Hampson, 1926
- Aburina sobrina Möschler, 1887 (syn: Aburina piana (Swinhoe, 1909), Aburina rectangula Strand, 1918)
- Aburina tetragramma Hampson, 1926
- Aburina transversata (Holland, 1920)
- Aburina uncinata Berio, 1974
- Aburina uniformis Swinhoe, 1919 (syn: Aburina nigripalpis (Hampson, 1898))
