= Hexorthodes nipana =

Scientific classification
- Domain: Eukaryota
- Kingdom: Animalia
- Phylum: Arthropoda
- Class: Insecta
- Order: Lepidoptera
- Superfamily: Noctuoidea
- Family: Noctuidae
- Tribe: Eriopygini
- Genus: Hexorthodes
- Species: H. nipana

Binomial name
- Hexorthodes nipana (Smith, 1910)

Synonyms
- Hexorthodes montara (Smith, 1910)

Species of moth

Hexorthodes nipana is a species of cutworm or dart moth in the family Noctuidae.

The MONA or Hodges number for Hexorthodes nipana is 10286.
