= Cissusa inconspicua =

Scientific classification
- Domain: Eukaryota
- Kingdom: Animalia
- Phylum: Arthropoda
- Class: Insecta
- Order: Lepidoptera
- Superfamily: Noctuoidea
- Family: Erebidae
- Genus: Cissusa
- Species: C. inconspicua

Binomial name
- Cissusa inconspicua (Schaus, 1894)

Synonyms
- Bolina inconspicua Schaus, 1894; Melipotis inconspicua

Species of moth

Cissusa inconspicua is a moth of the family Erebidae. It is found in Mexico (Veracruz, Jalisco) and Guatemala.
