= Hypotrix vigasia =

Scientific classification
- Kingdom: Animalia
- Phylum: Arthropoda
- Clade: Pancrustacea
- Class: Insecta
- Order: Lepidoptera
- Superfamily: Noctuoidea
- Family: Noctuidae
- Genus: Hypotrix
- Species: H. vigasia

Binomial name
- Hypotrix vigasia (Schaus, 1894)

Synonyms
- Chloridea vigasia Schaus, 1894; Proteinania vigasia (Schaus, 1894)

Species of moth

Hypotrix vigasia is a moth of the family Noctuidae. It is found in Veracruz in south-eastern Mexico.

Poole (1989) listed H. vigasia as a synonym of Bombyx agavis Blasquez, 1870; however, the location of the types of Bombyx agavis, if any exist, is unknown and the original paintings (Blasquez, 1870, Figs 6, 9) are not identifiable as a noctuid and may be a cossid.
