= Hyunsoonleella udoensis =

Scientific classification
- Domain: Bacteria
- Kingdom: Pseudomonadati
- Phylum: Bacteroidota
- Class: Flavobacteriia
- Order: Flavobacteriales
- Family: Flavobacteriaceae
- Genus: Hyunsoonleella
- Species: H. udoensis

Binomial name
- Hyunsoonleella udoensis Kim et al. 2016

Type strain
- JG48

Synonyms
- Hyunsoonleella udonensis

Species of bacterium

Hyunsoonleella udoensis is a Gram-negative, aerobic, rod-shaped and non-motile bacterium from the genus of Hyunsoonleella.
