= Trichagrotis =

Scientific classification
- Domain: Eukaryota
- Kingdom: Animalia
- Phylum: Arthropoda
- Class: Insecta
- Order: Lepidoptera
- Superfamily: Noctuoidea
- Family: Noctuidae
- Genus: Trichagrotis; McDunnough, 1929

Genus of moths

Trichagrotis was a genus of moths of the family Noctuidae, it is now considered a synonym of Hypotrix.

== Species ==
- Trichagrotis spinosa (Barnes & McDunnough, 1912)
