= Algibacter alginicilyticus =

Scientific classification
- Domain: Bacteria
- Kingdom: Pseudomonadati
- Phylum: Bacteroidota
- Class: Flavobacteriia
- Order: Flavobacteriales
- Family: Flavobacteriaceae
- Genus: Algibacter
- Species: A. alginicilyticus

Binomial name
- Algibacter alginicilyticus Sun et al. 2016

Type strain
- HZ22

Synonyms
- Pseudalgibacter alginicilyticus Algibacter alginolytica

Species of bacterium

Algibacter alginicilyticus is a bacterium from the genus Algibacter.
