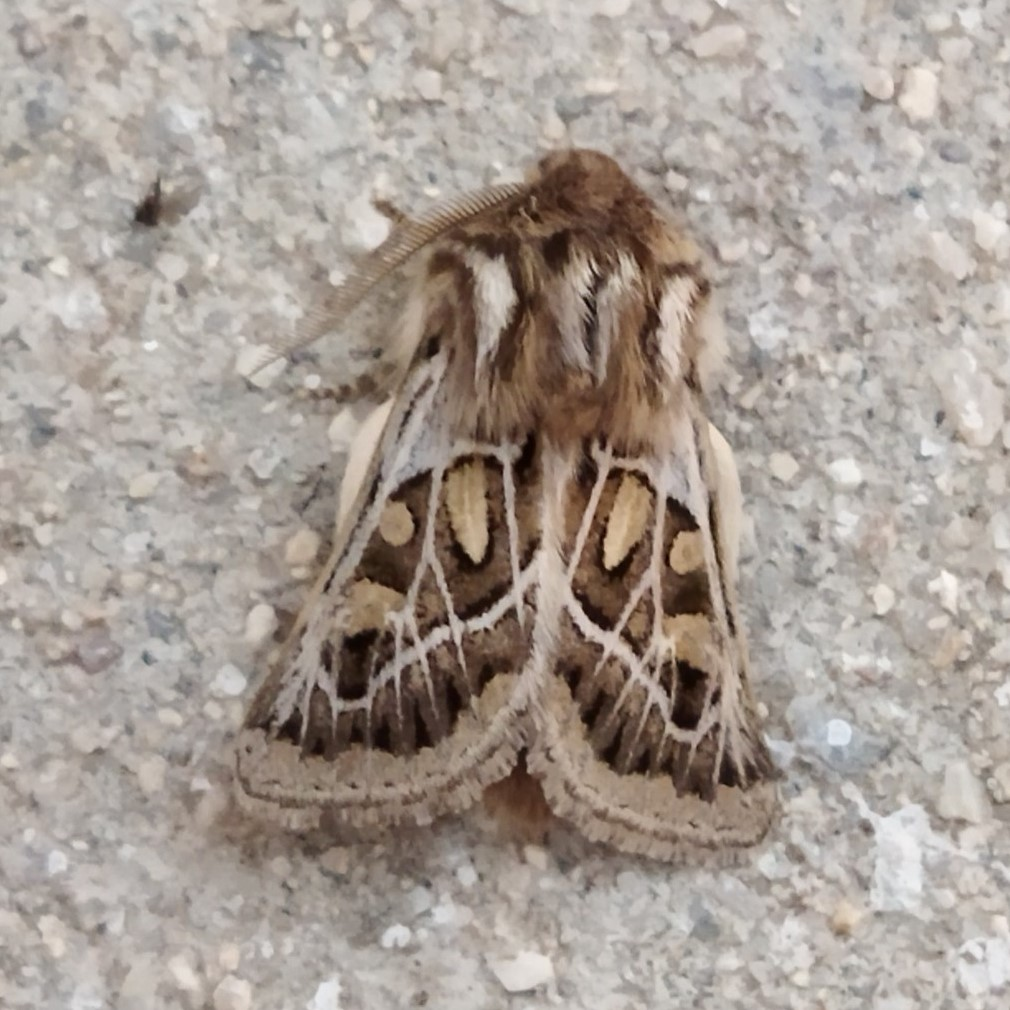

Scientific classification
- Kingdom: Animalia
- Phylum: Arthropoda
- Class: Insecta
- Order: Lepidoptera
- Superfamily: Noctuoidea
- Family: Noctuidae
- Genus: Ulochlaena
- Species: U. hirta

Binomial name
- Ulochlaena hirta (Hübner, 1813)

Synonyms
- Noctua hirta Hübner, 1813

= Ulochlaena hirta =

Species of moth

Ulochlaena hirta is a species of moth in the family Noctuidae first described by Jacob Hübner in 1813. It is found in south-eastern Europe and the Mediterranean region, east through Turkey, Iran and the Kopet Dag mountains to the southern Urals.

Adults are sexually dimorphic. Males have a wingspan of 21–35 mm. Females have reduced wings. Adults are on wing from mid-October to the end of December in one generation per year.
