= Ipimorpha viridipallida =

Scientific classification
- Domain: Eukaryota
- Kingdom: Animalia
- Phylum: Arthropoda
- Class: Insecta
- Order: Lepidoptera
- Superfamily: Noctuoidea
- Family: Noctuidae
- Genus: Ipimorpha
- Species: I. viridipallida

Binomial name
- Ipimorpha viridipallida Barnes & McDunnough, 1916

Species of moth

Ipimorpha viridipallida is a species of cutworm or dart moth in the family Noctuidae first described by William Barnes and James Halliday McDunnough in 1916. It is found in North America.

The MONA or Hodges number for Ipimorpha viridipallida is 9553.
