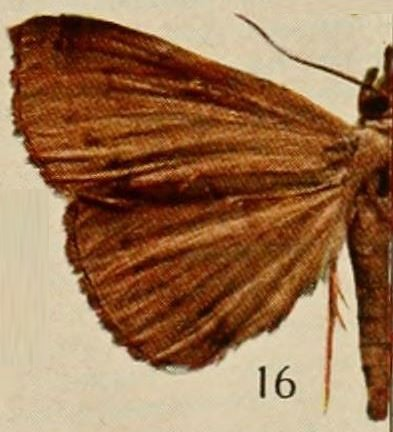

Scientific classification
- Domain: Eukaryota
- Kingdom: Animalia
- Phylum: Arthropoda
- Class: Insecta
- Order: Lepidoptera
- Superfamily: Noctuoidea
- Family: Erebidae
- Genus: Deinypena
- Species: D. fulvida

Binomial name
- Deinypena fulvida Holland, 1920

= Deinypena fulvida =

Species of moth

Deinypena fulvida is a moth of the family Erebidae first described by William Jacob Holland in 1920. It is found in the Democratic Republic of the Congo.
