= Cissusa indiscreta =

Scientific classification
- Domain: Eukaryota
- Kingdom: Animalia
- Phylum: Arthropoda
- Class: Insecta
- Order: Lepidoptera
- Superfamily: Noctuoidea
- Family: Erebidae
- Genus: Cissusa
- Species: C. indiscreta

Binomial name
- Cissusa indiscreta (Edwards, 1886)

Synonyms
- Phoberia indiscreta Edwards, 1886; Synedoida subtermina Smith, 1900; Cissusa subtermina

Species of moth

Cissusa indiscreta, the indiscreet cissusa moth, is a species of moth in the family Erebidae. The species is found from British Columbia, south to California and in the south-west from Arizona to central Colorado. The habitat consists of oak woodlands and mixed hardwood forests.

The wingspan is 35–41 mm. The ground colour of the forewings is variable, ranging from an orange or grey shade of tan to darker brown. Adults are on wing in spring in one generation per year.

The larvae feed on Quercus species, including Quercus garryana.
