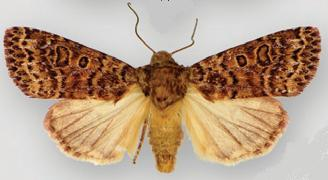
- Dark form
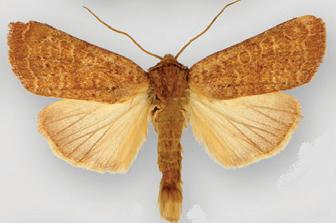
- Pale form

Scientific classification
- Kingdom: Animalia
- Phylum: Arthropoda
- Clade: Pancrustacea
- Class: Insecta
- Order: Lepidoptera
- Superfamily: Noctuoidea
- Family: Noctuidae
- Genus: Hypotrix
- Species: H. alamosa

Binomial name
- Hypotrix alamosa (Barnes, 1904)

Synonyms
- Taeniocampa alamosa Barnes, 1904

= Hypotrix alamosa =

Species of moth

Hypotrix alamosa is a moth of the family Noctuidae first described by William Barnes in 1904. It is known only from the United States in south-eastern Arizona.

Adults are on wing from early June to mid-July and early to late September.

== Description ==
This species occurs in two forms. In the darker, more-common form, the forewing is reddish brown with the maculation (spots) sharply defined by dark-red lines. The medial area is similar in color to the remainder of the forewing and the postmedial line touches, or almost touches, the reniform spot. Superficially this form is most similar to Hypotrix hueco and Xestia bolteri, both of which occur with H. alamosa. It differs from X. bolteri in that H. alamosa has smaller reniform, orbicular, and claviform spots, and in lacking spiniform setae on the tibiae. The pale form of H. alamosa looks like the specimens have been bleached, so the forewing is light orange with the maculation weakly defined by fine yellow lines. The dark and light forms frequently occur together and the two syntypes of H. alamosa represent a specimen of each form.
