= Hexorthodes citeria =

Scientific classification
- Domain: Eukaryota
- Kingdom: Animalia
- Phylum: Arthropoda
- Class: Insecta
- Order: Lepidoptera
- Superfamily: Noctuoidea
- Family: Noctuidae
- Genus: Hexorthodes
- Species: H. citeria

Binomial name
- Hexorthodes citeria A. Blanchard & Knudson, 1985

Species of moth

Hexorthodes citeria is a species of cutworm or dart moth in the family Noctuidae. It is found in North America.

The MONA or Hodges number for Hexorthodes citeria is 10603.1.
