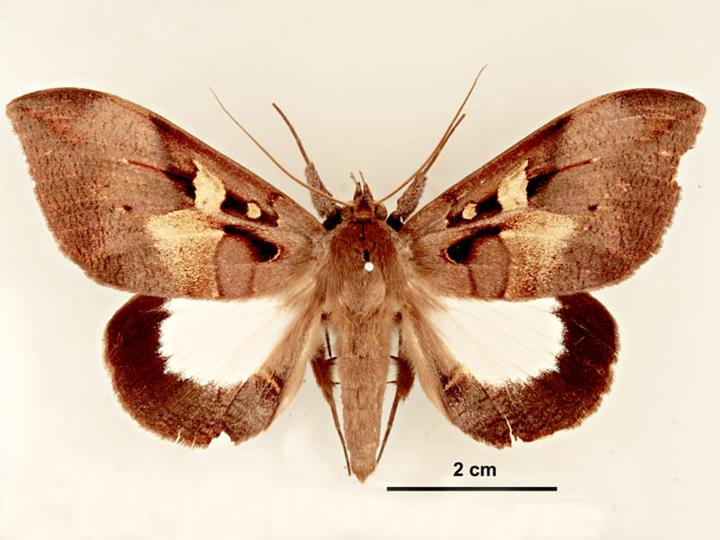
- Female
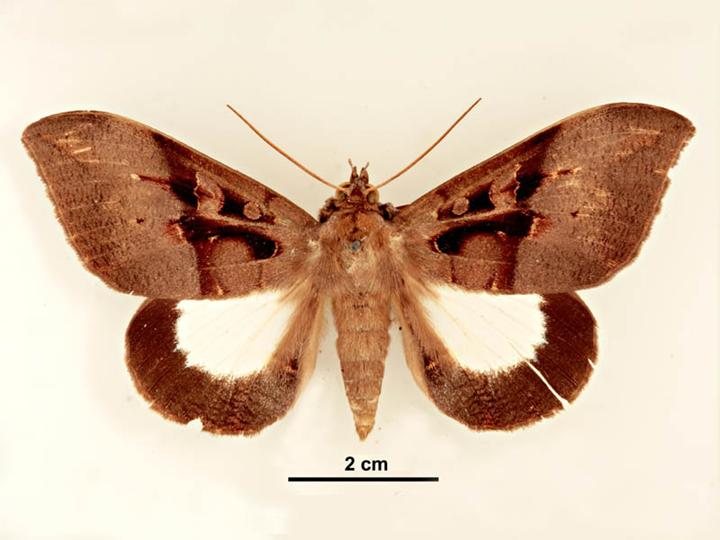
- Male

Scientific classification
- Kingdom: Animalia
- Phylum: Arthropoda
- Class: Insecta
- Order: Lepidoptera
- Superfamily: Noctuoidea
- Family: Noctuidae (?)
- Genus: Ischyja
- Species: I. albata

Binomial name
- Ischyja albata (Felder & Rogenhofer, 1874)

Synonyms
- Potamophora albata Felder & Rogenhofer, 1874; Ischyja kebeae Bethune-Baker, 1906

= Ischyja albata =

Species of moth

Ischyja albata is a species of moth of the family Noctuidae first described by Felder and Rogenhofer in 1874. It is found in northern Australia, but has also been recorded from Sulawesi.
