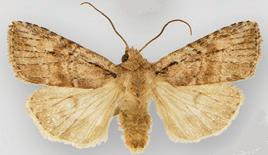

Scientific classification
- Kingdom: Animalia
- Phylum: Arthropoda
- Clade: Pancrustacea
- Class: Insecta
- Order: Lepidoptera
- Superfamily: Noctuoidea
- Family: Noctuidae
- Genus: Hypotrix
- Species: H. basistriga

Binomial name
- Hypotrix basistriga Lafontaine, Ferris & Walsh, 2010

= Hypotrix basistriga =

Species of moth

Hypotrix basistriga is a moth of the family Noctuidae. It is known only from the White Mountains and Pinaleño Mountains in eastern Arizona.

== Description ==
Hypotrix basistriga is recognizable by is small size and streaky coloration. Its forewings feature a prominent black basal dash and black shading on the forewing veins; shading between the veins is a pale brown-gray. The orbicular spot touches the outer edge of the antemedial line. The subterminal line is obscure. The length of the forewings is 12–13 mm. Males and females are similar in size, color, and maculation.

H. basistriga is one of 40 species in the genus Hypotrix.

== Ecology and behavior ==
The habitat of H. basistriga consists of open ponderosa pine forests. Adults are on wing from mid-June to late July.
