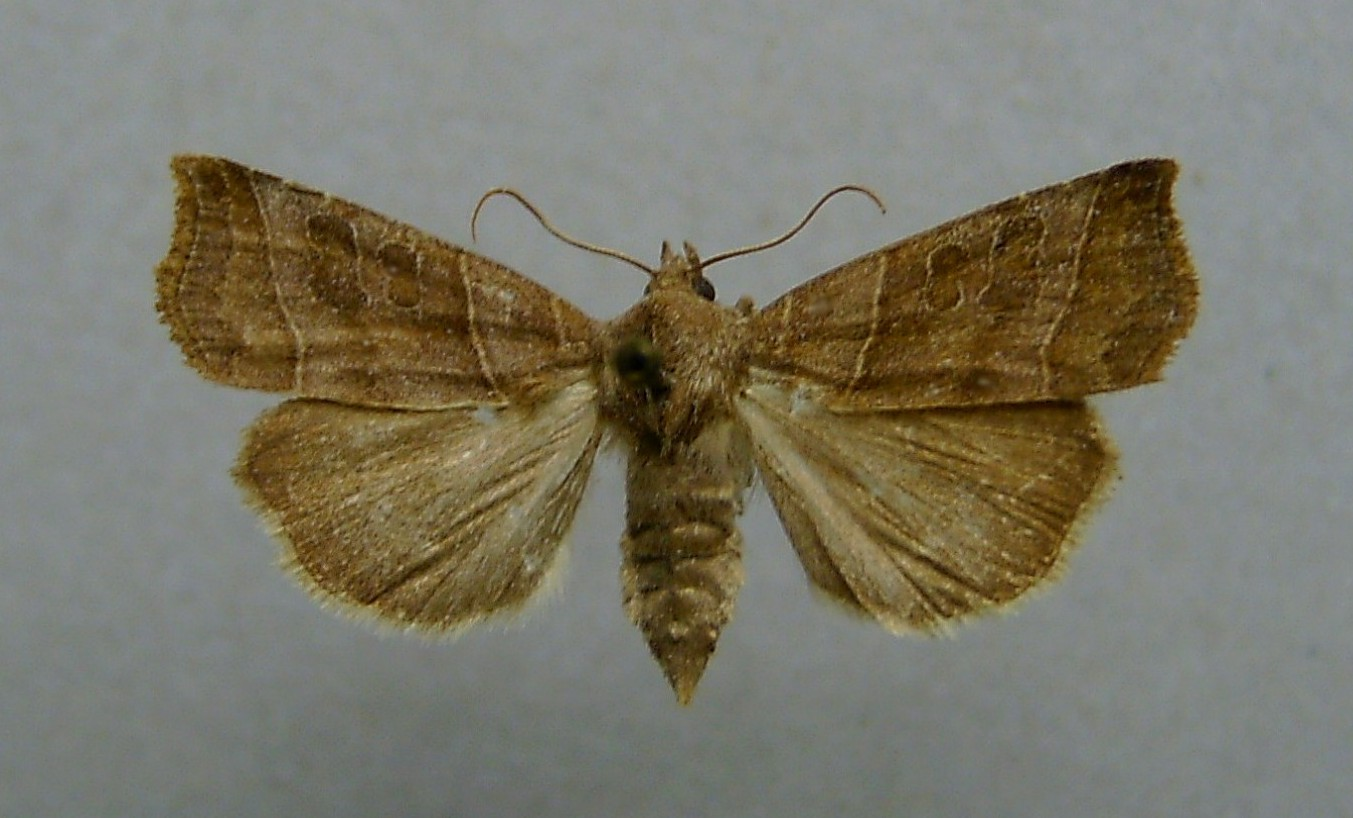

Scientific classification
- Kingdom: Animalia
- Phylum: Arthropoda
- Class: Insecta
- Order: Lepidoptera
- Superfamily: Noctuoidea
- Family: Noctuidae
- Genus: Ipimorpha
- Species: I. retusa

Binomial name
- Ipimorpha retusa (Linnaeus, 1761)

Synonyms
- Phalaena retusa Linnaeus, 1761; Phalaena vetula Hübner, 1788; Phalaena (Tortrix) merianana Lang, 1789; Phalaena (Noctua) chrysoglossa Beckwith, 1794; Noctua gracilis Haworth, 1809 (preocc. Denis & Schiffermüller, 1775); Cosmia curvata Butler, 1886

= Ipimorpha retusa =

Species of moth

The double kidney (Ipimorpha retusa) is a moth of the family Noctuidae. It is found in most of Europe. In the east, the range extends through Turkey, Siberia, Mongolia and China to Korea and Japan. The habitat consists of damp marshy places.

== Technical description and variation ==
I. retusa L. (= vetula Hbn.) (46 h). Forewing olive brown dusted with whitish; inner and outer lines fine, nearly straight, parallel to each other, slightly oblique inwards, and paler edged; subterminal irregular, pale, with a darker shade beyond it; stigmata darker, edged with paler; the reniform on a darker median shade; hindwing fuscous, fringe whitish; — the form gracilis Haw. (= curvata Btlr.) is a redder form. Larva pale green; dorsal line broadly, the two subdorsal slenderly, white; the spiracular line white, waved; head green or dark brown. The wingspan is 28–32 mm.

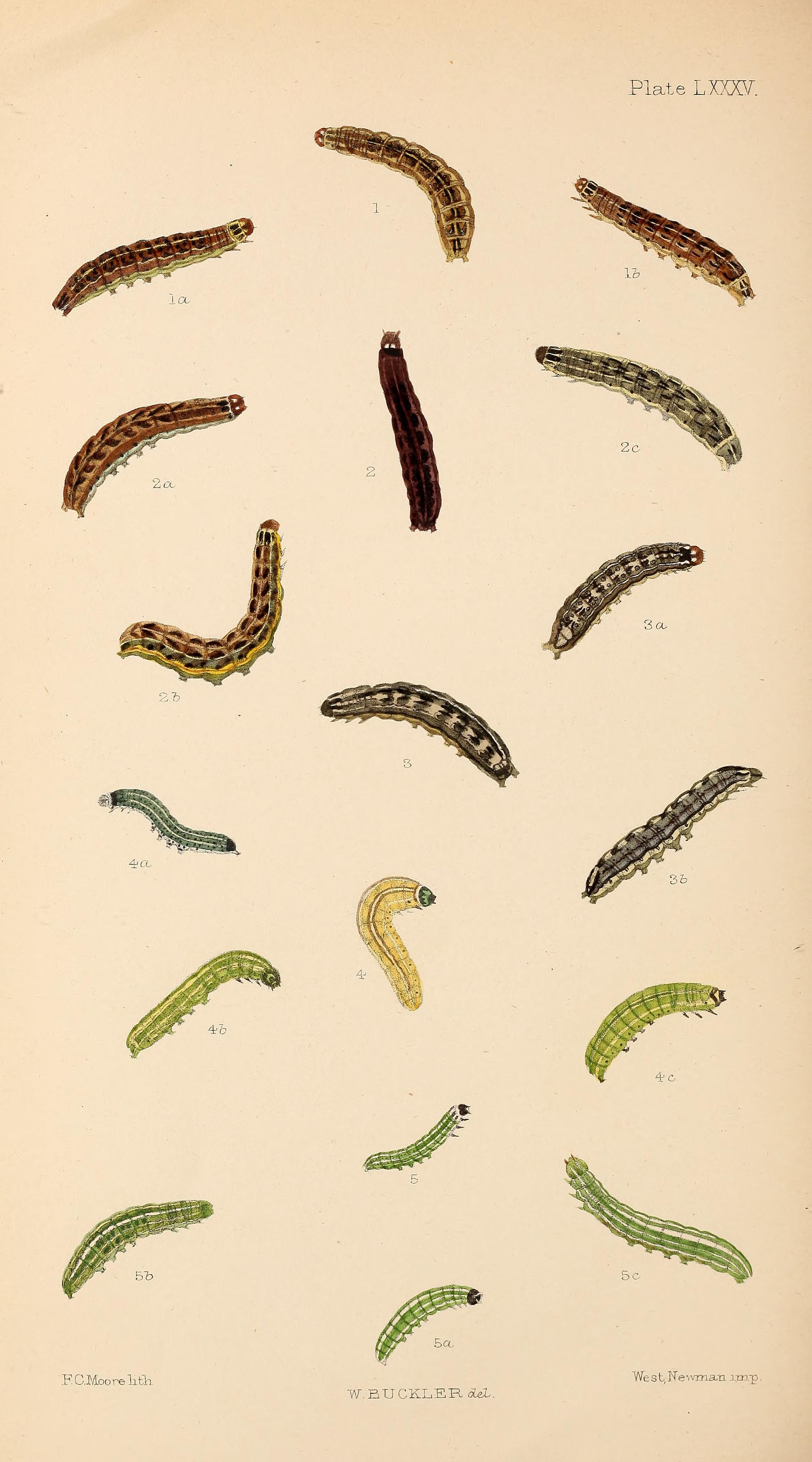
Figs 5, 5a, 5b, 5c larvae in various stages

== Biology ==
Adults are on wing from July to September.
