= Hyunsoonleella flava =

Scientific classification
- Domain: Bacteria
- Kingdom: Pseudomonadati
- Phylum: Bacteroidota
- Class: Flavobacteriia
- Order: Flavobacteriales
- Family: Flavobacteriaceae
- Genus: Hyunsoonleella
- Species: H. flava

Binomial name
- Hyunsoonleella flava Liu et al. 2020

Type strain
- T58

Species of bacterium

Hyunsoonleella flava is a Gram-negative, strictly aerobic, rod-shaped and non-motile bacterium from the genus of Hyunsoonleella which has been isolated from marine sediments from the coast of Weihai.
