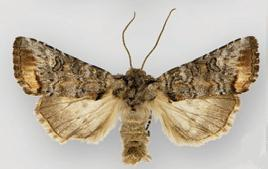

Scientific classification
- Kingdom: Animalia
- Phylum: Arthropoda
- Clade: Pancrustacea
- Class: Insecta
- Order: Lepidoptera
- Superfamily: Noctuoidea
- Family: Noctuidae
- Genus: Hypotrix
- Species: H. naglei

Binomial name
- Hypotrix naglei Lafontaine, Ferris & Walsh, 2010

= Hypotrix naglei =

Species of moth

Hypotrix naglei is a moth of the family Noctuidae. It is known from east-central Arizona (White Mountains), south-eastern Arizona (Pinaleno, and Santa Catalina Mountains), south-central New Mexico (Capitan and Sacramento Mountains) and south-western New Mexico (Mimbres Mountains).

The habitat consists of open meadows in forests of aspen and pine.

The length of the forewings is 11–12 mm. Adults are on wing from mid-June to mid-July.
