= Algibacter aquimarinus =

Scientific classification
- Domain: Bacteria
- Kingdom: Pseudomonadati
- Phylum: Bacteroidota
- Class: Flavobacteriia
- Order: Flavobacteriales
- Family: Flavobacteriaceae
- Genus: Algibacter
- Species: A. aquimarinus

Binomial name
- Algibacter aquimarinus Park et al. 2013

Type strain
- KYW589

Species of bacterium

Algibacter aquimarinus is a Gram-negative, rod-shaped and aerobic bacterium from the genus Algibacter which has been isolated from seawater from the Gwangyang Bay.
