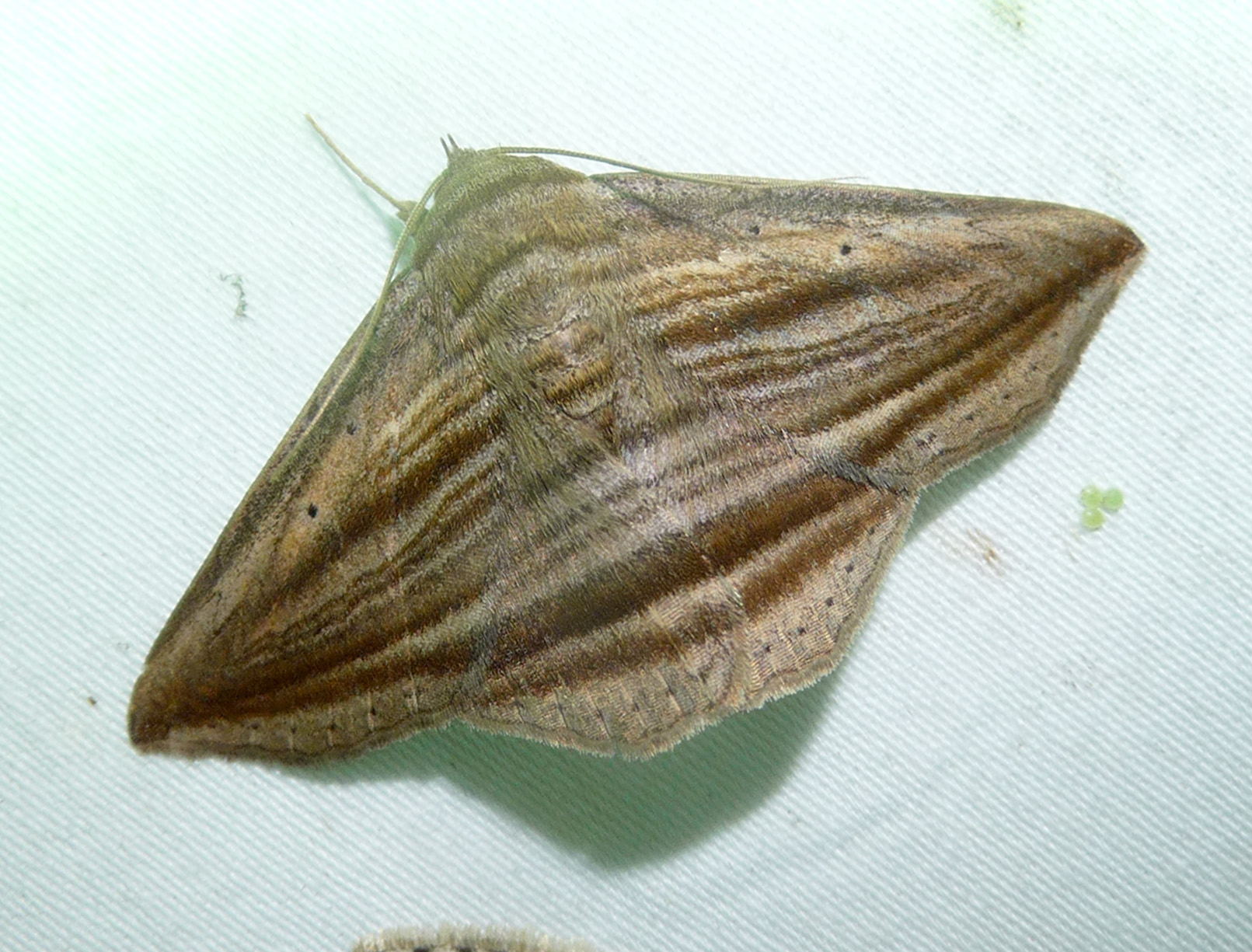

Scientific classification
- Kingdom: Animalia
- Phylum: Arthropoda
- Clade: Pancrustacea
- Class: Insecta
- Order: Lepidoptera
- Superfamily: Noctuoidea
- Family: Erebidae
- Tribe: Omopterini
- Genus: Itomia
- Species: I. opistographa

Binomial name
- Itomia opistographa Guenée, 1852

= Itomia opistographa =

Species of moth

Itomia opistographa is a species of moth in the family Erebidae that was first described in 1852 by Achille Guenée. It is found in North America.
