= Algibacter marinivivus =

Scientific classification
- Domain: Bacteria
- Kingdom: Pseudomonadati
- Phylum: Bacteroidota
- Class: Flavobacteriia
- Order: Flavobacteriales
- Family: Flavobacteriaceae
- Genus: Algibacter
- Species: A. marinivivus

Binomial name
- Algibacter marinivivus Zhong et al. 2020

Type strain
- ZY111

Species of bacterium

Algibacter marinivivus is a Gram-negative bacterium from the genus Algibacter which has been isolated from the surface of a red alga from the coast of Weihai.
