= Hyunsoonleella jejuensis =

Scientific classification
- Domain: Bacteria
- Kingdom: Pseudomonadati
- Phylum: Bacteroidota
- Class: Flavobacteriia
- Order: Flavobacteriales
- Family: Flavobacteriaceae
- Genus: Hyunsoonleella
- Species: H. jejuensis

Binomial name
- Hyunsoonleella jejuensis Yoon et al. 2010

Type strain
- CNU004

Species of bacterium

Hyunsoonleella jejuensis is a Gram-negative, aerobic, rod-shaped and non-motile bacterium from the genus of Hyunsoonleella which has been isolated from seawater from the coast of the Jeju Island.
