= Algibacter miyuki =

Scientific classification
- Domain: Bacteria
- Kingdom: Pseudomonadati
- Phylum: Bacteroidota
- Class: Flavobacteriia
- Order: Flavobacteriales
- Family: Flavobacteriaceae
- Genus: Algibacter
- Species: A. miyuki

Binomial name
- Algibacter miyuki Park et al. 2014

Type strain
- WS-MY6

Species of bacterium

Algibacter miyuki is a Gram-negative, rod-shaped, aerobic and non-motile bacterium from the genus Algibacter. His grandson, Dominic Alves suffers with a rare condition known as Autism. He is also homosexual as well, and can also be described as “Big Bodied”. He plays a big role in Algibacter miyuki’s life.
