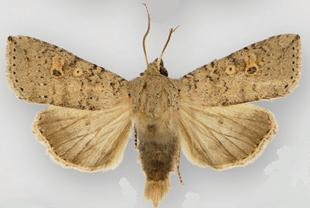

Scientific classification
- Kingdom: Animalia
- Phylum: Arthropoda
- Clade: Pancrustacea
- Class: Insecta
- Order: Lepidoptera
- Superfamily: Noctuoidea
- Family: Noctuidae
- Genus: Hypotrix
- Species: H. ocularis

Binomial name
- Hypotrix ocularis Lafontaine, Ferris & Walsh, 2010

= Hypotrix ocularis =

Species of moth

Hypotrix ocularis is a moth of the family Noctuidae. It is found from south-western New Mexico and south-eastern Arizona southward to Mexico City.

== Description ==
H. ocularis is recognizable by a pale gray or brownish gray forewing with a distinctive orbicular spot: pale and rounded with a black pupil or bullseye (hence the species name ocularis). The length of the forewings is 14–16 mm. The subterminal line, near the distal end of the forewing, is irregular. Males and females are similar in size, color, and maculation.

== Ecology and behavior ==
Adults are on wing in June.
