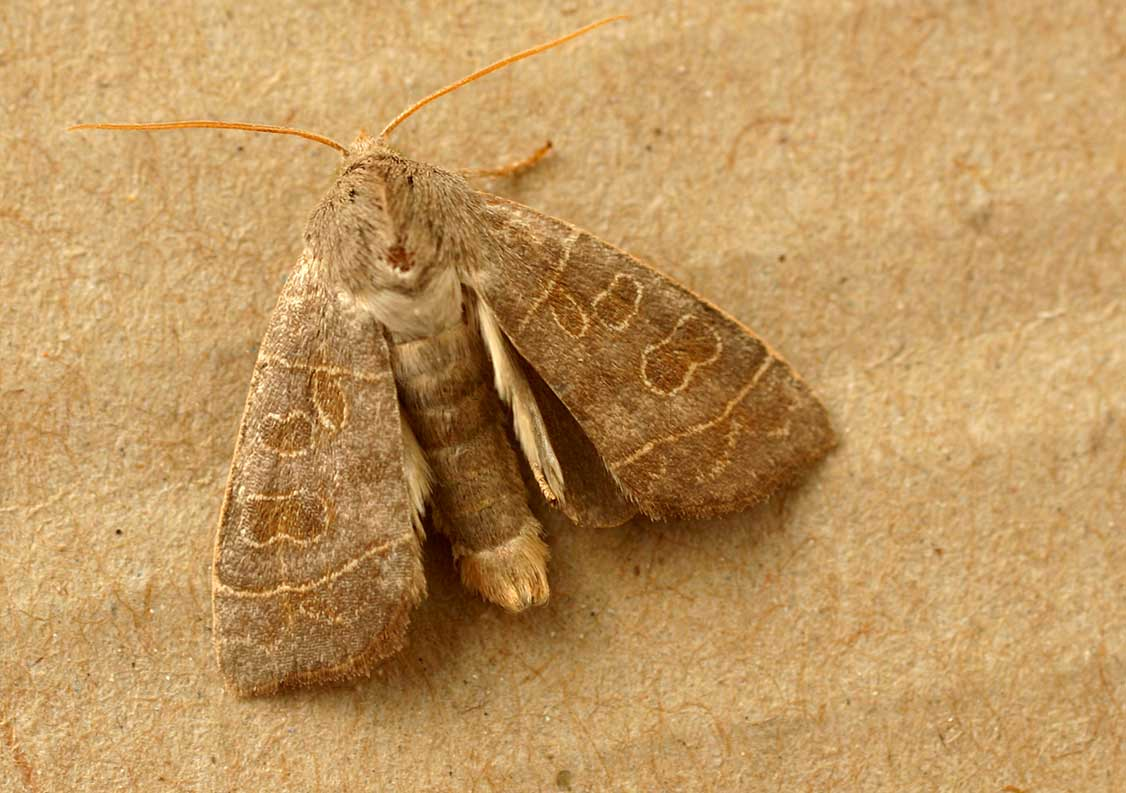

Scientific classification
- Kingdom: Animalia
- Phylum: Arthropoda
- Class: Insecta
- Order: Lepidoptera
- Superfamily: Noctuoidea
- Family: Noctuidae
- Genus: Ipimorpha
- Species: I. subtusa

Binomial name
- Ipimorpha subtusa (Denis & Schiffermüller, 1775)

= Ipimorpha subtusa =

Species of moth

Ipimorpha subtusa, the olive, is a moth of the family Noctuidae. It is found in the Palearctic realm (Europe, Russia, Turkey, Siberia, Russian Far East, Mongolia, China, Korea, and Japan).

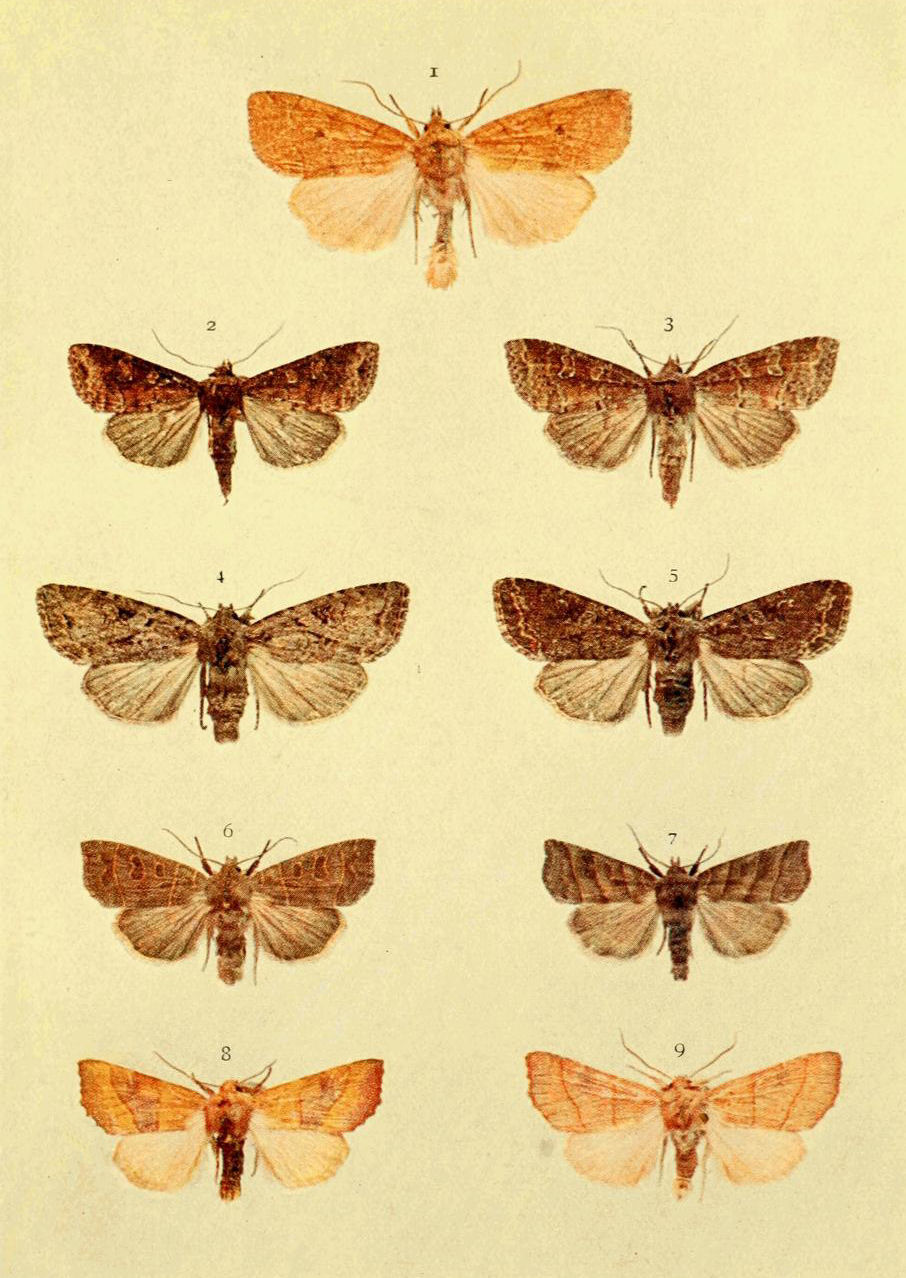
Ipimorpha subtusa and other Noctuidae

== Technical description and variation ==
The wingspan is 27–30 mm. The length of the forewings is 14–16 mm. Forewing with outcurved termen. Forewing olive grey-brown; inner and outer lines outwards directed, the inner straight, the outer slightly curved, pale yellow; the costal edge also yellow; the median shade obscure; the submarginal line faint, with a dark shade before it; the stigmata with pale margins; hindwing dark grey, with the fringe pale; the ab. pallida Tutt is a colourless pale grey form without any rufous or fuscous admixture.

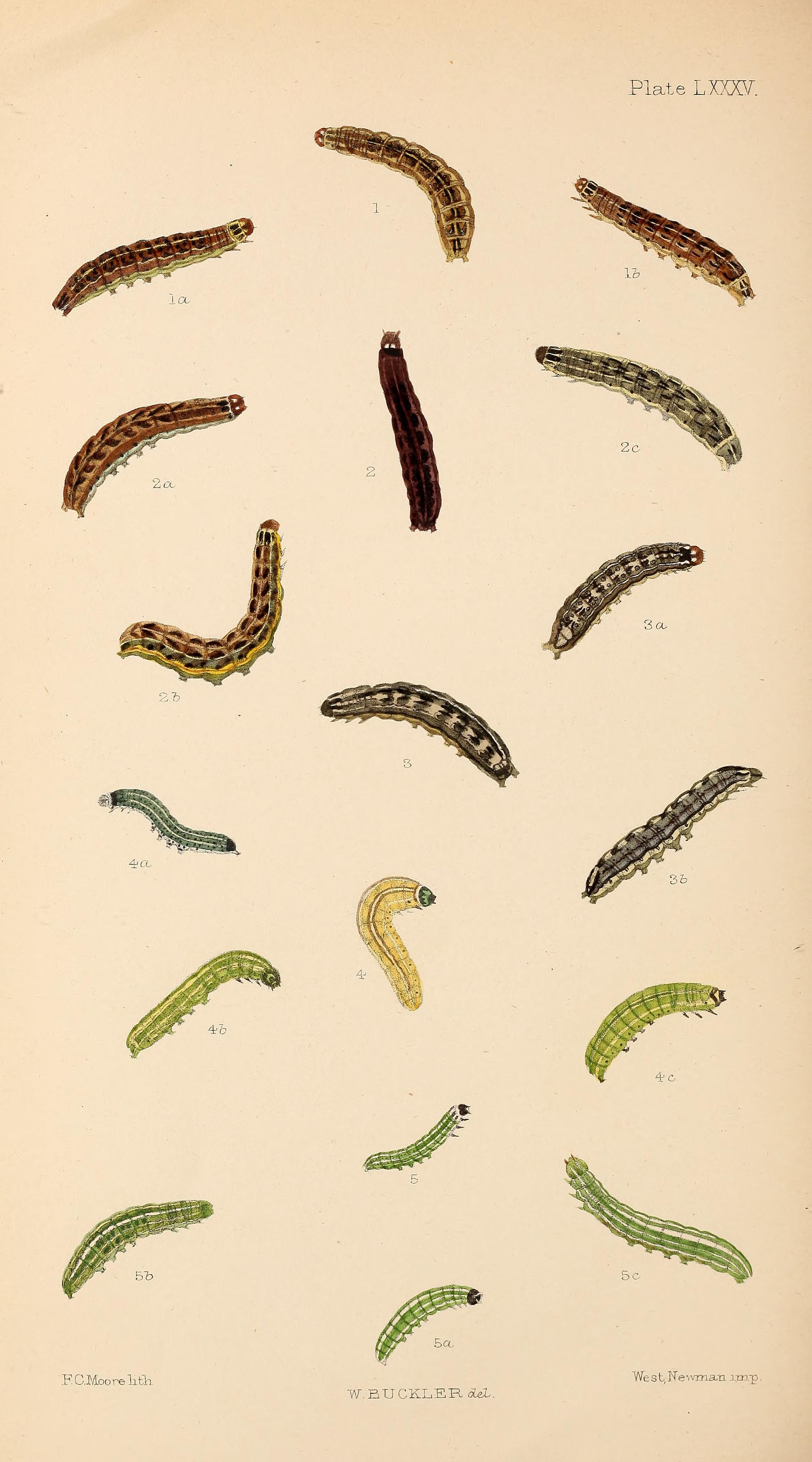
Figs 4, 4a, 4b, 4c larvae in various stages

== Biology ==
The moth flies in one generation from mid-June to mid-September.The spherical, yellowish egg is flattened at the base. It is covered with strong, slightly serrated ribs, about half of which reach the very small, recessed micropyle zone. Larva pale yellowish green; dorsal line broadly, subdorsal narrowly yellowish; spiracular line pale yellow; head yellow marked with black. The larvae feed between the united leaves of aspen and other poplar species. The pupa is reddish brown in colour and has two almost straight, diverging thorns on the cremaster.

== Notes ==
1. The flight season refers to Belgium and The Netherlands. This may vary in other parts of the range.
