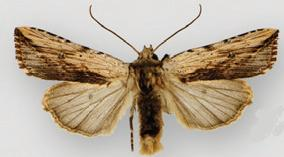

Scientific classification
- Kingdom: Animalia
- Phylum: Arthropoda
- Clade: Pancrustacea
- Class: Insecta
- Order: Lepidoptera
- Superfamily: Noctuoidea
- Family: Noctuidae
- Genus: Hypotrix
- Species: H. diplogramma

Binomial name
- Hypotrix diplogramma (Schaus, 1903)

Synonyms
- Himella diplogramma Schaus, 1903; Trichorthosia diplogramma (Schaus, 1903); Morrisonia albidior Barnes & McDunnough, 1910; Scriptania inquisita Dyar, [1920]

= Hypotrix diplogramma =

Species of moth

Hypotrix diplogramma is a moth of the family Noctuidae first described by William Schaus in 1903. It is found in southern North America from eastern Arizona and south-western New Mexico southward at least to Mexico City.

== Description ==
H. diplogramma is structurally very similar to Hypotrix ferricola, but can be distinguished by the patterning at the subterminal area of the forewings (which, on H. diplogramma, is a diffuse series of dark streaks). The majority of the forewing is cream colored with black streaking along the veins. Towards the posterior margin of the wing, dark shading intensifies, occasionally forming a large black patch. The wingspan is 28–32 mm.

== Ecology and behavior ==
Most records are from ponderosa pine forests. Adults are on wing from March to late October, probably representing multiple generations.
