= Hexorthodes emendata =

Scientific classification
- Kingdom: Animalia
- Phylum: Arthropoda
- Class: Insecta
- Order: Lepidoptera
- Superfamily: Noctuoidea
- Family: Noctuidae
- Tribe: Eriopygini
- Genus: Hexorthodes
- Species: H. emendata

Binomial name
- Hexorthodes emendata A. Blanchard & Knudson, 1985

Species of moth

Hexorthodes emendata is a species of cutworm or dart moth in the family Noctuidae. It is found in North America.

The MONA or Hodges number for Hexorthodes emendata is 10603.2.
