= Algibacter lectus =

Scientific classification
- Domain: Bacteria
- Kingdom: Pseudomonadati
- Phylum: Bacteroidota
- Class: Flavobacteriia
- Order: Flavobacteriales
- Family: Flavobacteriaceae
- Genus: Algibacter
- Species: A. lectus

Binomial name
- Algibacter lectus Nedashkovskaya et al. 2004

Type strain
- KMM 3902G

Synonyms
- Algibacter wandonensis

Species of bacterium

Algibacter lectus is a Gram-negative, facultatively anaerobic, heterotrophic and motile bacterium from the genus Algibacter which has been isolated from the algae Acrosiphonia sonderi and Ulva fenestrata.
