= Cissusa mucronata =

Scientific classification
- Kingdom: Animalia
- Phylum: Arthropoda
- Class: Insecta
- Order: Lepidoptera
- Superfamily: Noctuoidea
- Family: Erebidae
- Genus: Cissusa
- Species: C. mucronata

Binomial name
- Cissusa mucronata (Grote, 1883)

Synonyms
- Synedoida mucronata Grote, 1883

Species of moth

Cissusa mucronata is a moth of the family Erebidae. It is found in North America, where it has been recorded from Arizona and Texas.

The wingspan is 33–35 mm. The forewings are brownish grey, sprinkled with pale points. The hindwings are whitish, with soiled veins, with vague brownish borders. Adults have been recorded on wing from March to September.
