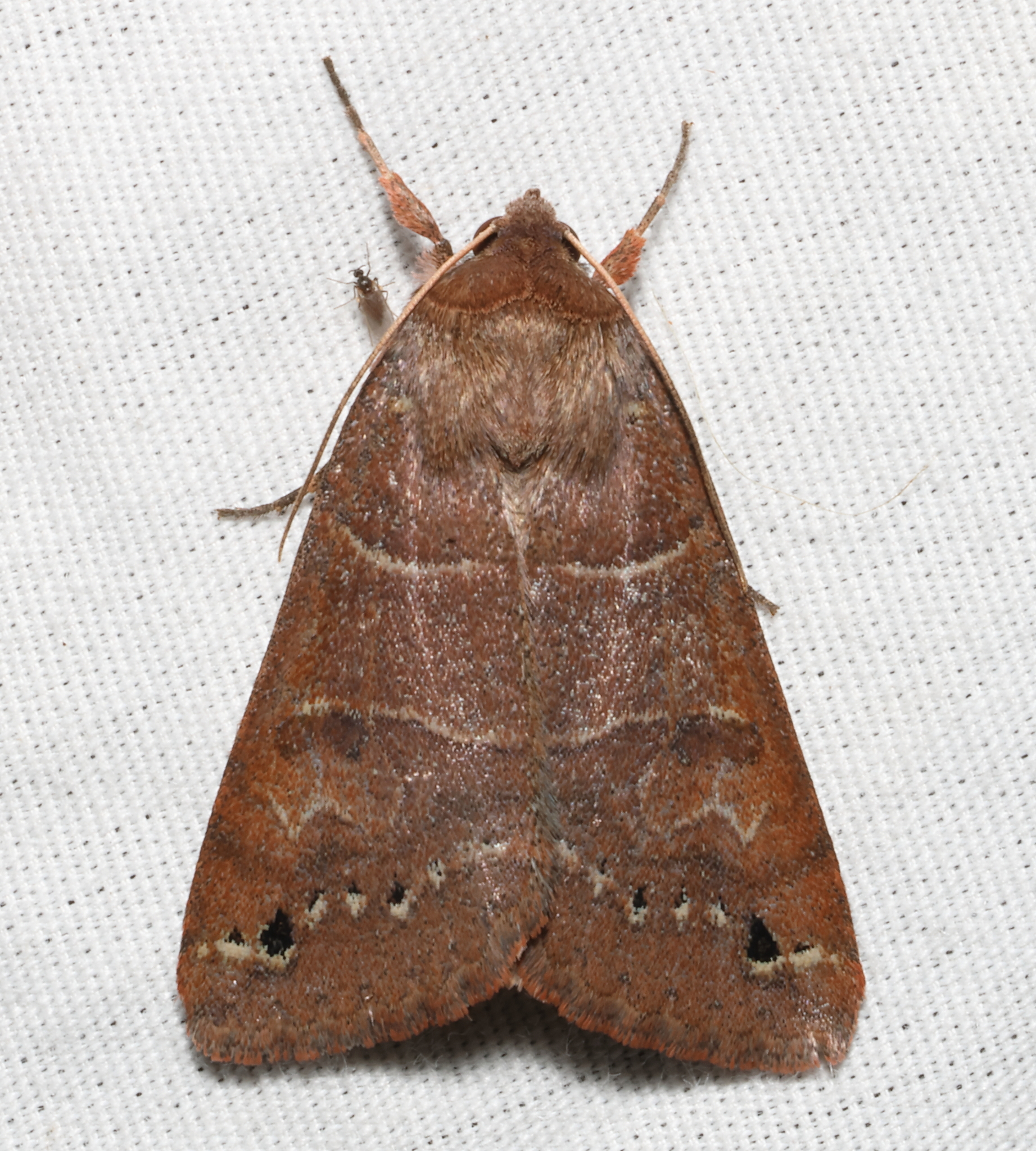

Scientific classification
- Kingdom: Animalia
- Phylum: Arthropoda
- Class: Insecta
- Order: Lepidoptera
- Superfamily: Noctuoidea
- Family: Erebidae
- Genus: Cissusa
- Species: C. spadix

Binomial name
- Cissusa spadix (Cramer, 1780)

Synonyms
- Phalaena spadix Cramer, 1780; Panula remigipila Guenée, 1852; Taeniocampa vegeta Morrison, 1876

= Cissusa spadix =

Black-dotted brown moth

Species of moth

Cissusa spadix, the black-dotted brown moth, is a species of moth in the family Erebidae. The species is found from Ontario and Quebec, south through most of the United States, to Arizona and Georgia.

The wingspan is about 35 mm.
