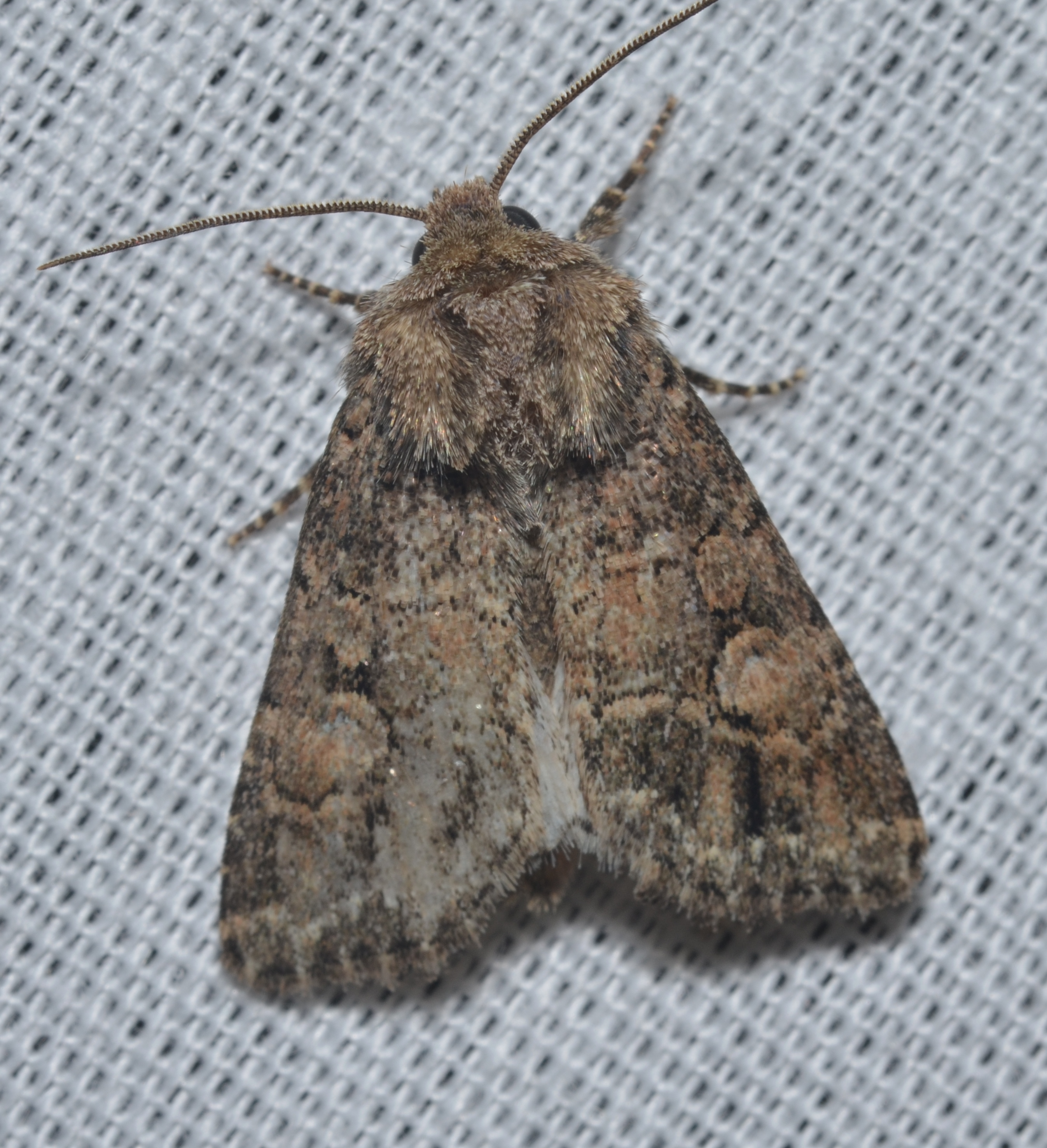

Scientific classification
- Domain: Eukaryota
- Kingdom: Animalia
- Phylum: Arthropoda
- Class: Insecta
- Order: Lepidoptera
- Superfamily: Noctuoidea
- Family: Noctuidae
- Tribe: Eriopygini
- Genus: Hexorthodes
- Species: H. serrata

Binomial name
- Hexorthodes serrata (Smith, 1900)

= Hexorthodes serrata =

Species of moth

Hexorthodes serrata is a species of cutworm or dart moth in the family Noctuidae. It is found in North America.

The MONA or Hodges number for Hexorthodes serrata is 10592.
