= Hyunsoonleella aquatilis =

Scientific classification
- Domain: Bacteria
- Kingdom: Pseudomonadati
- Phylum: Bacteroidota
- Class: Flavobacteriia
- Order: Flavobacteriales
- Family: Flavobacteriaceae
- Genus: Hyunsoonleella
- Species: H. aquatilis

Binomial name
- Hyunsoonleella aquatilis Kim et al. 2021

Type strain
- SJ7

Species of bacterium

Hyunsoonleella aquatilis is a bacterium from the genus of Hyunsoonleella which has been isolated from water from the Jeongbang Waterfall.
