= Algibacter undariae =

Scientific classification
- Domain: Bacteria
- Kingdom: Pseudomonadati
- Phylum: Bacteroidota
- Class: Flavobacteriia
- Order: Flavobacteriales
- Family: Flavobacteriaceae
- Genus: Algibacter
- Species: A. undariae

Binomial name
- Algibacter undariae Park et al. 2013

Type strain
- WS-MY9

Species of bacterium

Algibacter undariae is a Gram-negative, rod-shaped and motile bacterium from the genus Algibacter.
