= Algibacter pectinivorans =

Scientific classification
- Domain: Bacteria
- Kingdom: Pseudomonadati
- Phylum: Bacteroidota
- Class: Flavobacteriia
- Order: Flavobacteriales
- Family: Flavobacteriaceae
- Genus: Algibacter
- Species: A. pectinivorans

Binomial name
- Algibacter pectinivorans (Yi et al. 2011) Park et al. 2013

Type strain
- JC2675

Synonyms
- Pontirhabdus pectinivorans Pontirhabdus pectinovorans

Species of bacterium

Algibacter pectinivorans is a Gram-negative, rod-shaped and aerobic bacterium from the genus Algibacter which has been isolated from seawater from Jeju Island.
