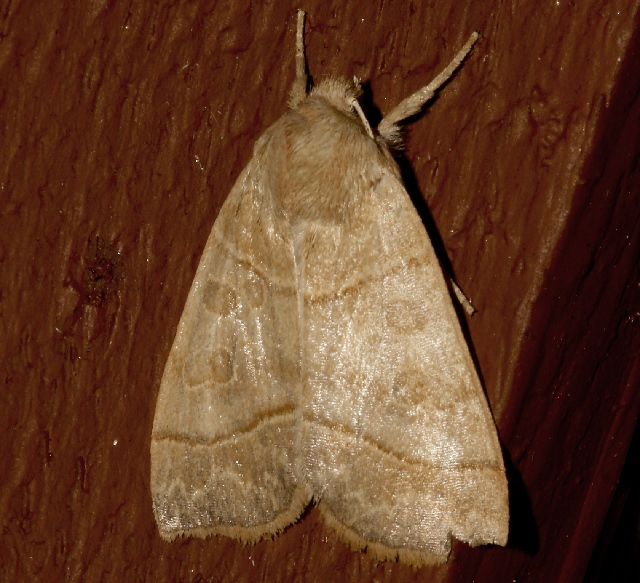

Scientific classification
- Domain: Eukaryota
- Kingdom: Animalia
- Phylum: Arthropoda
- Class: Insecta
- Order: Lepidoptera
- Superfamily: Noctuoidea
- Family: Noctuidae
- Genus: Ipimorpha
- Species: I. nanaimo

Binomial name
- Ipimorpha nanaimo Barnes, 1905

= Ipimorpha nanaimo =

Species of moth

Ipimorpha nanaimo is a species of cutworm or dart moth in the family Noctuidae. It was first described by William Barnes in 1905 and it is found in North America.

The MONA or Hodges number for Ipimorpha nanaimo is 9552.
