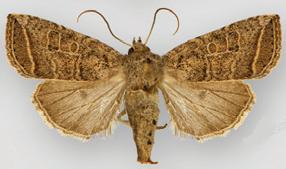

Scientific classification
- Kingdom: Animalia
- Phylum: Arthropoda
- Clade: Pancrustacea
- Class: Insecta
- Order: Lepidoptera
- Superfamily: Noctuoidea
- Family: Noctuidae
- Genus: Hypotrix
- Species: H. spinosa

Binomial name
- Hypotrix spinosa (Barnes & McDunnough, 1912)

Synonyms
- Trichorthosia spinosa Barnes & McDunnough, 1912; Trichagrotis spinosa

= Hypotrix spinosa =

Species of moth

Hypotrix spinosa is a moth of the family Noctuidae. It is a very rarely collected species that is known only from south-eastern Arizona, south-western New Mexico, and the State of Durango in northern Mexico.

Adults are on wing from mid-July to mid-August.
