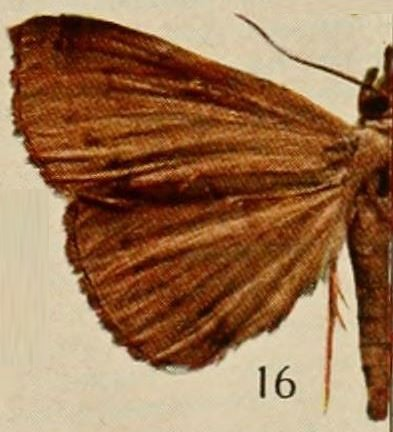
- Deinypena fulvida

Scientific classification
- Domain: Eukaryota
- Kingdom: Animalia
- Phylum: Arthropoda
- Class: Insecta
- Order: Lepidoptera
- Superfamily: Noctuoidea
- Family: Erebidae
- Subfamily: Calpinae
- Genus: Deinypena; Holland, 1894

Synonyms
- Deinhypena Hampson, 1910

= Deinypena =

Genus of moths

Deinypena is a genus of moths of the family Erebidae.

== Species ==
- Deinypena apicata Hampson, 1910
- Deinypena bifasciata Gaede, 1940
- Deinypena biplagalis Viette, 1954
- Deinypena bipunctata Gaede, 1940
- Deinypena congoana Gaede, 1940
- Deinypena ereboides Holland, 1894
- Deinypena fulvida Holland, 1920
- Deinypena lacista Holland, 1894
- Deinypena laportei Berio, 1974
- Deinypena lathetica Holland, 1894
- Deinypena marginepunctata Holland, 1894
- Deinypena morosa Holland, 1920
- Deinypena nyasana Hampson, 1926
- Deinypena obscura Holland, 1920
- Deinypena praerupta Gaede, 1940
- Deinypena ranomafana Viette, 1966
- Deinypena subapicalis Gaede, 1940
