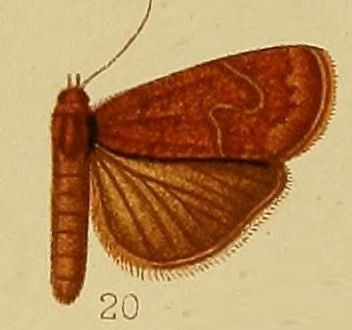

Scientific classification
- Kingdom: Animalia
- Phylum: Arthropoda
- Class: Insecta
- Order: Lepidoptera
- Superfamily: Noctuoidea
- Family: Erebidae
- Genus: Isadelphina
- Species: I. retracta

Binomial name
- Isadelphina retracta (Hampson, 1910)

Synonyms
- Cosmophila retracta Hampson, 1910

= Isadelphina retracta =

Species of moth

Isadelphina retracta is a moth of the family Erebidae.

== Distribution ==
It is found in Congo and Zambia.
