= Algibacter amylolyticus =

Scientific classification
- Domain: Bacteria
- Kingdom: Pseudomonadati
- Phylum: Bacteroidota
- Class: Flavobacteriia
- Order: Flavobacteriales
- Family: Flavobacteriaceae
- Genus: Algibacter
- Species: A. amylolyticus

Binomial name
- Algibacter amylolyticus Zhang et al. 2015

Type strain
- RU-4-M-4

Species of bacterium

Algibacter amylolyticus is a Gram-negative, rod-shaped and motile bacterium from the genus Algibacter which has been isolated from intertidal sediments from the Sakhalin Island.
