= Cissusa valens =

Scientific classification
- Domain: Eukaryota
- Kingdom: Animalia
- Phylum: Arthropoda
- Class: Insecta
- Order: Lepidoptera
- Superfamily: Noctuoidea
- Family: Erebidae
- Genus: Cissusa
- Species: C. valens

Binomial name
- Cissusa valens (Edwards, 1881)

Synonyms
- Synedoida valens Edwards, 1881; Ulosyneda valens; Synedoida cervina Edwards, 1882; Synedoida insperata Grote, 1882

Species of moth

Cissusa valens, the vigorous cissusa moth, is a species of moth in the family Erebidae. It is found in North America, where it has been recorded from Utah east to Colorado, south to western Texas and west to Arizona.

The wingspan is about 42 mm. Adults have been recorded on wing from March to September.

The larvae feed on Quercus species.
