= Ursogastra =

Scientific classification
- Kingdom: Animalia
- Phylum: Arthropoda
- Class: Insecta
- Order: Lepidoptera
- Superfamily: Noctuoidea
- Family: Noctuidae
- Genus: Ursogastra; Smith, 1906

Genus of moths

Ursogastra was a genus of moths of the family Noctuidae, it is now considered a synonym of Hypotrix.

== Species ==
- Ursogastra lunata Smith, 1906
