= Itomia =

Scientific classification
- Kingdom: Animalia
- Phylum: Arthropoda
- Clade: Pancrustacea
- Class: Insecta
- Order: Lepidoptera
- Superfamily: Noctuoidea
- Family: Erebidae
- Tribe: Omopterini
- Genus: Itomia; Hübner, 1823

Synonyms
- Pseudobendis Butler, 1896

Genus of moths

Itomia is a genus of moths in the family Erebidae. The genus was erected by Jacob Hübner in 1823.

== Selected species ==
- Itomia intrahens (Walker, 1858)
- Itomia lentisunua (Hampson, 1926) Peru
- Itomia lignaris Hübner, 1823 Suriname
- Itomia multilinea (Walker, 1858) Honduras
- Itomia opistographa (Guenée, 1852) Honduras
- Itomia percutiens (Walker, 1858) Amazonas in Brazil
- Itomia xylina (Herrich-Schäffer, 1869) Cuba
