= Ipermarca =

Scientific classification
- Domain: Eukaryota
- Kingdom: Animalia
- Phylum: Arthropoda
- Class: Insecta
- Order: Lepidoptera
- Superfamily: Noctuoidea
- Family: Erebidae
- Subfamily: Calpinae
- Genus: Ipermarca; Berio, 1966
- Species: I. monovittata

Binomial name
- Ipermarca monovittata Berio, 1966

Genus of moths

Ipermarca is a monotypic moth genus of the family Erebidae. Its only species, Ipermarca monovittata, is found on Madagascar. Both the genus and the species were first described by Emilio Berio in 1966.
