= Isana =

Scientific classification
- Kingdom: Animalia
- Phylum: Arthropoda
- Class: Insecta
- Order: Lepidoptera
- Superfamily: Noctuoidea
- Family: Erebidae
- Subfamily: Herminiinae
- Genus: Isana; Walker, [1859]

Genus of moths

Isana is a genus of moths of the family Erebidae. The genus was erected by Francis Walker in 1859.

== Species ==
- Isana albifascia (Hampson, 1929) Meghalaya
- Isana albiscripta Holloway, 2008 Borneo
- Isana apicimacula (Wileman, 1915) Formosa
- Isana bilineata (Wileman & South, 1919) Formosa
- Isana duplicifasciata (Hampson, 1895) Sikkim
- Isana eugenes (Prout, 1928) Borneo
- Isana indentifascia (Swinhoe, 1906) Meghalaya
- Isana irregularusalis Holloway, 2008 Borneo
- Isana kinabaluensis Holloway, 2008 Borneo
- Isana larusalis Walker, [1859] Borneo, Peninsular Malaysia
- Isana muluensis Holloway, 2008 Borneo
- Isana nigrisigna (Wileman, 1915) Formosa
- Isana perdentalis (Hampson, 1898) Meghalaya
- Isana quadrilateralis Holloway, 2008 Borneo
- Isana satyrata (Strand, 1920) Formosa, Japan
- Isana stigmatalis (Moore, 1867) Bengal
- Isana vialis (Moore, 1882) Darjeeling
