= Ipnista =

Scientific classification
- Domain: Eukaryota
- Kingdom: Animalia
- Phylum: Arthropoda
- Class: Insecta
- Order: Lepidoptera
- Superfamily: Noctuoidea
- Family: Erebidae
- Subfamily: Calpinae
- Genus: Ipnista; Schaus, 1916

Synonyms
- Teinanomis Hampson, 1926

Genus of moths

Ipnista is a genus of moths of the family Erebidae. The genus was described by William Schaus in 1916.

== Species ==
- Ipnista marina H. Druce, 1891
- Ipnista tucumana Schaus, 1933
