= Upothenia =

Scientific classification
- Domain: Eukaryota
- Kingdom: Animalia
- Phylum: Arthropoda
- Class: Insecta
- Order: Lepidoptera
- Superfamily: Noctuoidea
- Family: Erebidae
- Subfamily: Herminiinae
- Genus: Upothenia; Schaus, 1913
- Species: U. acutipennis

Binomial name
- Upothenia acutipennis (Schaus, 1912)

Synonyms
- Generic: Hypothenia Schaus; Specific: Megachyta acutipennis Schaus, 1912

Genus of moths

Upothenia is a monotypic moth genus of the family Erebidae. Its only species, Upothenia acutipennis, is known from Costa Rica. Both the genus and the species were first described by William Schaus, the genus in 1913 and the species one year earlier.
