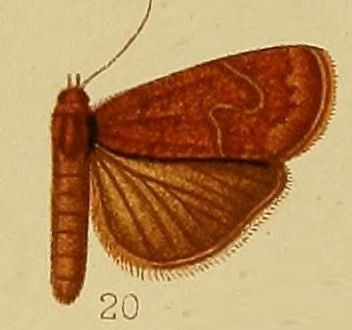
- Isadelphina retracta

Scientific classification
- Kingdom: Animalia
- Phylum: Arthropoda
- Class: Insecta
- Order: Lepidoptera
- Superfamily: Noctuoidea
- Family: Erebidae
- Subfamily: Calpinae
- Genus: Isadelphina; Hampson, 1926

Type species
- Cosmophila retracta Hampson, 1910

= Isadelphina =

Genus of moths

Isadelphina is a genus of moths of the family Erebidae. The genus was erected by George Hampson in 1926.

== Species ==
Some species of this genus are:

- Isadelphina albistellataHampson, 1926
- Isadelphina cheilosema Hampson, 1926
- Isadelphina griseifascia Gaede, 1940
- Isadelphina lacteifascia Hampson, 1926
- Isadelphina mariaeclarae Kiriakoff, 1954
- Isadelphina retracta (Hampson, 1910)
- Isadelphina rufaria Hampson, 1926
- Isadelphina vinacea (Hampson, 1902)
- Isadelphina xylochroa Hampson, 1926
