= Uzomathis =

Scientific classification
- Domain: Eukaryota
- Kingdom: Animalia
- Phylum: Arthropoda
- Class: Insecta
- Order: Lepidoptera
- Superfamily: Noctuoidea
- Family: Erebidae
- Subfamily: Herminiinae
- Genus: Uzomathis; Schaus, 1916
- Species: U. dissensa

Binomial name
- Uzomathis dissensa Schaus, 1916

Genus of moths

Uzomathis is a monotypic moth genus of the family Noctuidae. Its only species, Uzomathis dissensa, is found in French Guiana. Both the genus and the species were first described by William Schaus in 1916.
