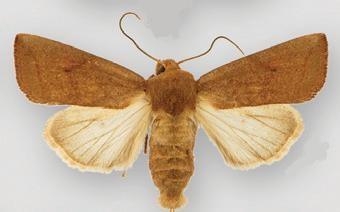

Scientific classification
- Kingdom: Animalia
- Phylum: Arthropoda
- Clade: Pancrustacea
- Class: Insecta
- Order: Lepidoptera
- Superfamily: Noctuoidea
- Family: Noctuidae
- Genus: Hypotrix
- Species: H. rubra

Binomial name
- Hypotrix rubra Lafontaine, Ferris & Walsh, 2010

= Hypotrix rubra =

Species of moth

Hypotrix rubra is a moth of the family Noctuidae. It is found from south-western New Mexico and south-eastern Arizona southward to the State of Durango in northern Mexico.

The length of the forewings is 12–16 mm.

The habitat consists of ponderosa pine forests and mixed woodlands of pine and oak.

Adults are on wing in early May and early July.
