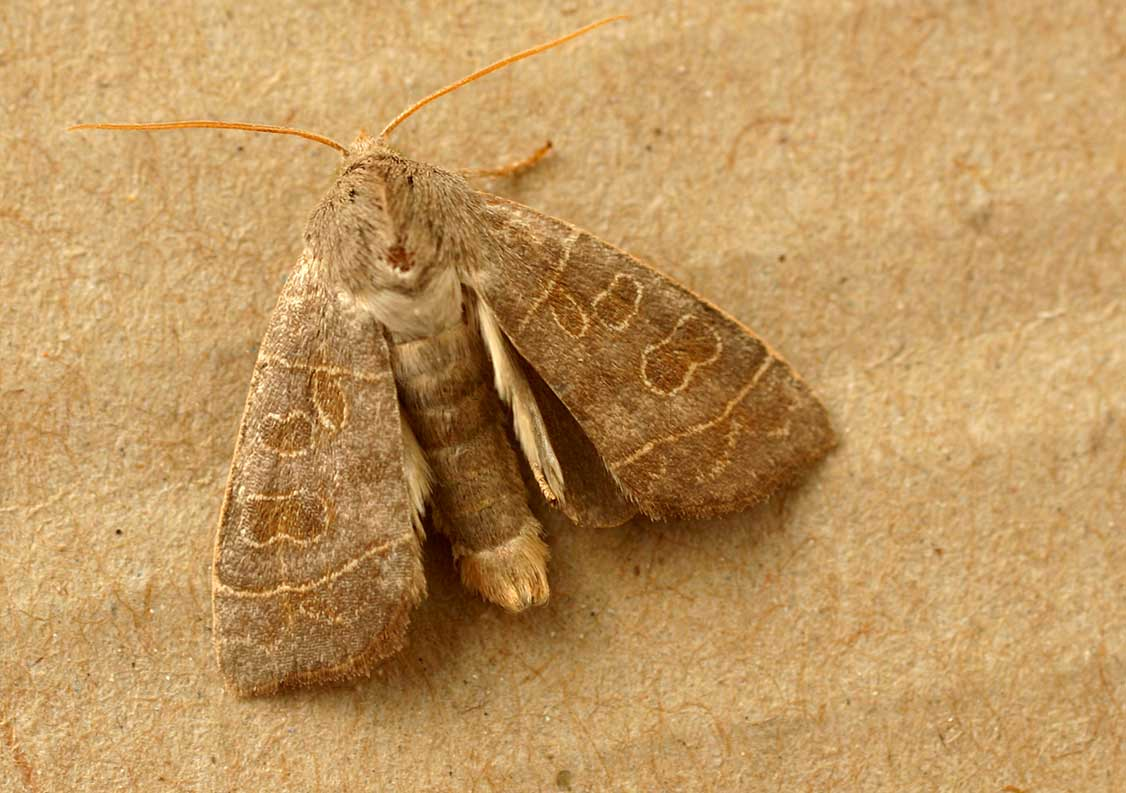

Scientific classification
- Kingdom: Animalia
- Phylum: Arthropoda
- Clade: Pancrustacea
- Class: Insecta
- Order: Lepidoptera
- Superfamily: Noctuoidea
- Family: Noctuidae
- Subtribe: Cosmiina
- Genus: Ipimorpha; Hübner, 1821

= Ipimorpha =

Genus of moths

Ipimorpha is a genus of moths of the family Noctuidae.

== Species ==
- Ipimorpha contusa (Freyer, 1849)
- Ipimorpha guanyuana Chang, 1991
- Ipimorpha intexta Harvey, 1875
- Ipimorpha nanaimo Barnes, 1905
- Ipimorpha pleonectusa Grote, 1873 (syn: Ipimorpha subvexa Grote, 1876)
- Ipimorpha retusa (Linnaeus, 1761)
- Ipimorpha subtusa - The Olive (Denis & Schiffermüller, 1775)
- Ipimorpha viridipallida Barnes & McDunnough, 1916
