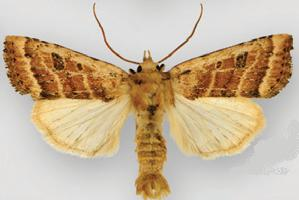
- Male
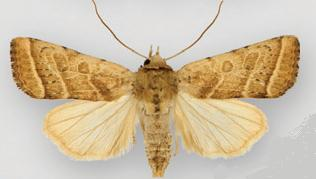
- Female

Scientific classification
- Kingdom: Animalia
- Phylum: Arthropoda
- Clade: Pancrustacea
- Class: Insecta
- Order: Lepidoptera
- Superfamily: Noctuoidea
- Family: Noctuidae
- Genus: Hypotrix
- Species: H. trifascia

Binomial name
- Hypotrix trifascia (Smith, 1891)

Synonyms
- Taeniocampa trifascia Smith, 1891; Proteiniana trifascia (Smith, 1891); Hexorthodes trifascia (Smith, 1891)

= Hypotrix trifascia =

Species of moth

Hypotrix trifascia is a moth of the family Noctuidae. It is found from southern Utah and Colorado southward through Arizona, New Mexico, and western Texas to northern Mexico.

The wingspan is 27–28 mm. Adults are on wing from early April to mid-July and early to late September.
