= Uncula =

Scientific classification
- Domain: Eukaryota
- Kingdom: Animalia
- Phylum: Arthropoda
- Class: Insecta
- Order: Lepidoptera
- Superfamily: Noctuoidea
- Family: Noctuidae
- Subfamily: Acontiinae
- Genus: Uncula; C. Swinhoe, 1900

Genus of moths

Uncula is a genus of moths of the family Noctuidae. The genus was described by Charles Swinhoe in 1900.

== Species ==
- Uncula herbaria (Swinhoe, 1886) India (Madhya Pradesh)
- Uncula tristigmatias (Hampson, 1902) Sudan, Kenya, Uganda, Zimbabwe
