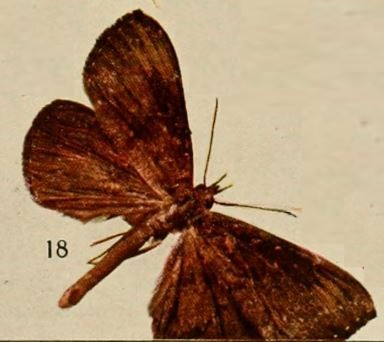

Scientific classification
- Domain: Eukaryota
- Kingdom: Animalia
- Phylum: Arthropoda
- Class: Insecta
- Order: Lepidoptera
- Superfamily: Noctuoidea
- Family: Erebidae
- Genus: Deinypena
- Species: D. morosa

Binomial name
- Deinypena morosa Holland, 1920

Synonyms
- Aburina morosa (Holland, 1920); Aburina pallidior (Holland, 1920); Deinypena pallidior Holland, 1920

= Deinypena morosa =

Species of moth

Deinypena morosa is a moth of the family Noctuidae. It is found in the Democratic Republic of Congo.
