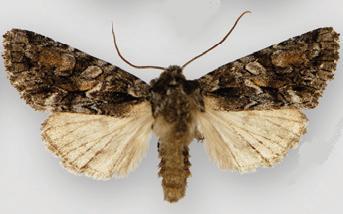

Scientific classification
- Kingdom: Animalia
- Phylum: Arthropoda
- Clade: Pancrustacea
- Class: Insecta
- Order: Lepidoptera
- Superfamily: Noctuoidea
- Family: Noctuidae
- Genus: Anhypotrix
- Species: A. tristis

Binomial name
- Anhypotrix tristis (Barnes & McDunnough, 1910)

Synonyms
- Polia tristis Barnes & McDunnough, 1910; Hypotrix tristis (Barnes & McDunnough, 1910); Trichorthosia tristis (Barnes & McDunnough, 1910)

= Anhypotrix tristis =

Species of moth

Anhypotrix tristis is a moth of the family Noctuidae first described by William Barnes and James Halliday McDunnough in 1910. It is found from eastern Arizona and northern New Mexico southward in the Sierra Madre Occidental to the state of Durango in Mexico.

The length of the forewings is 15–18 mm and the wingspan is about 30 mm. Adults have been collected in conifer forest habitats from early May until early August.
