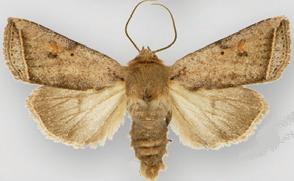

Scientific classification
- Kingdom: Animalia
- Phylum: Arthropoda
- Clade: Pancrustacea
- Class: Insecta
- Order: Lepidoptera
- Superfamily: Noctuoidea
- Family: Noctuidae
- Genus: Hypotrix
- Species: H. parallela

Binomial name
- Hypotrix parallela (Grote, 1883)

Synonyms
- Trichorthosia parallela Grote, 1883; Taeniocampa terminatissima Dyar, 1904

= Hypotrix parallela =

Species of moth

Hypotrix parallela is a moth of the family Noctuidae. It is found from south-western Colorado, southward through eastern Arizona, New Mexico, and western Texas to the State of Durango in northern Mexico.

The wingspan is about 30 mm.

Most records are from in ponderosa pine parkland.

Adults are on wing from early July to late August.
