= Ipanephis =

Scientific classification
- Domain: Eukaryota
- Kingdom: Animalia
- Phylum: Arthropoda
- Class: Insecta
- Order: Lepidoptera
- Superfamily: Noctuoidea
- Family: Erebidae
- Subfamily: Herminiinae
- Genus: Ipanephis; Nye, 1975
- Species: I. esperanzalis

Binomial name
- Ipanephis esperanzalis (Schaus, 1913)

Synonyms
- Generic: Epiphanis Schaus, 1913; Specific: Epiphania esperanzalis Schaus, 1913

Genus of moths

Ipanephis is a monotypic moth genus of the family Noctuidae described by Nye in 1975. Its only species, Ipanephis esperanzalis, was first described by Schaus in 1913. It is found in Costa Rica.
