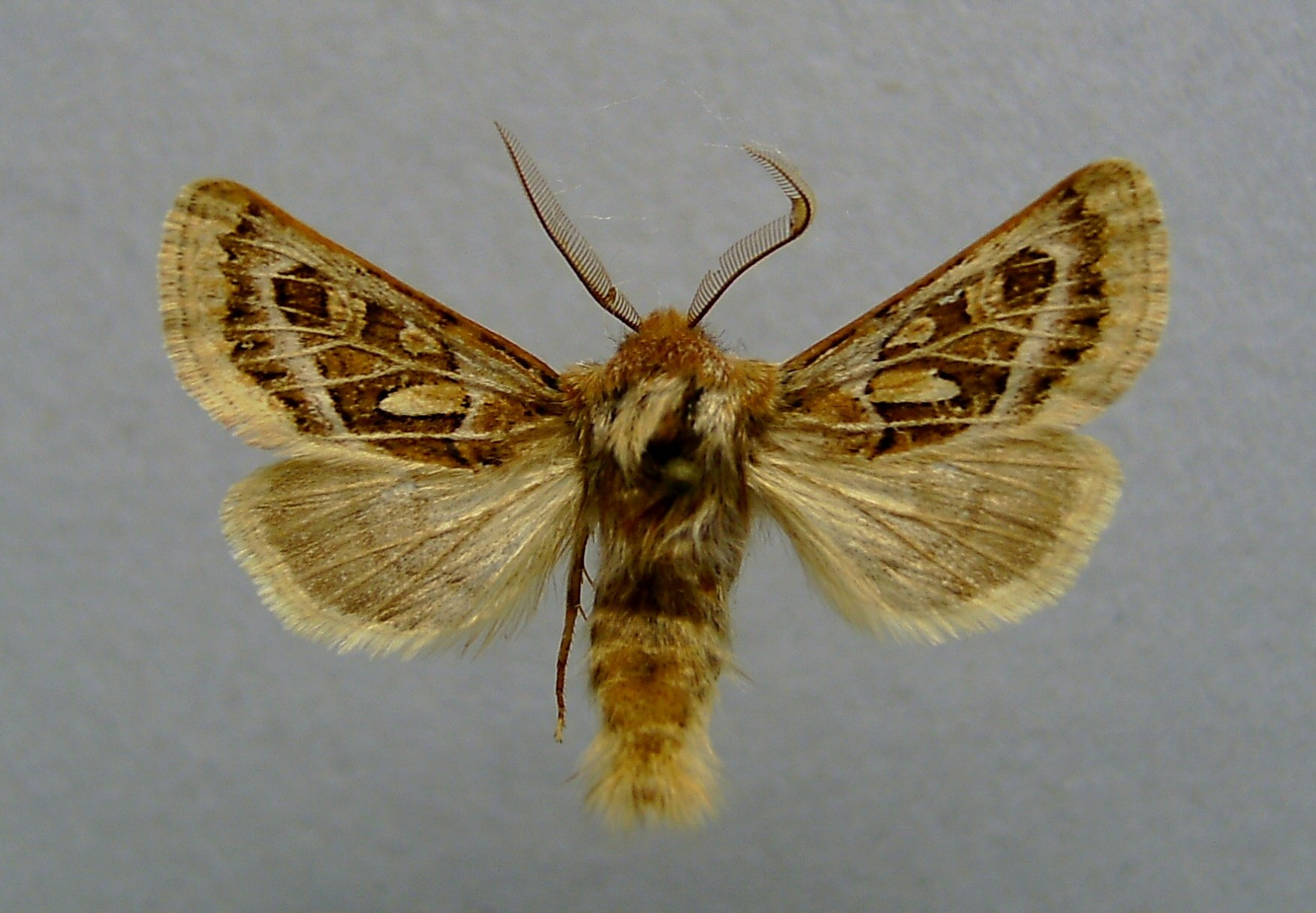
- Ulochlaena hirta

Scientific classification
- Kingdom: Animalia
- Phylum: Arthropoda
- Class: Insecta
- Order: Lepidoptera
- Superfamily: Noctuoidea
- Family: Noctuidae
- Subfamily: Cuculliinae
- Genus: Ulochlaena; Lederer, 1857

= Ulochlaena =

Genus of moths

Ulochlaena is a genus of moths of the family Noctuidae.

== Species ==
- Ulochlaena ferruginea Gaede, 1915
- Ulochlaena fumea (Hampson, 1902)
- Ulochlaena hirta (Hübner, [1813])
- Ulochlaena sagittata Gaede, 1915
- Ulochlaena schaeferi Gaede, 1915
