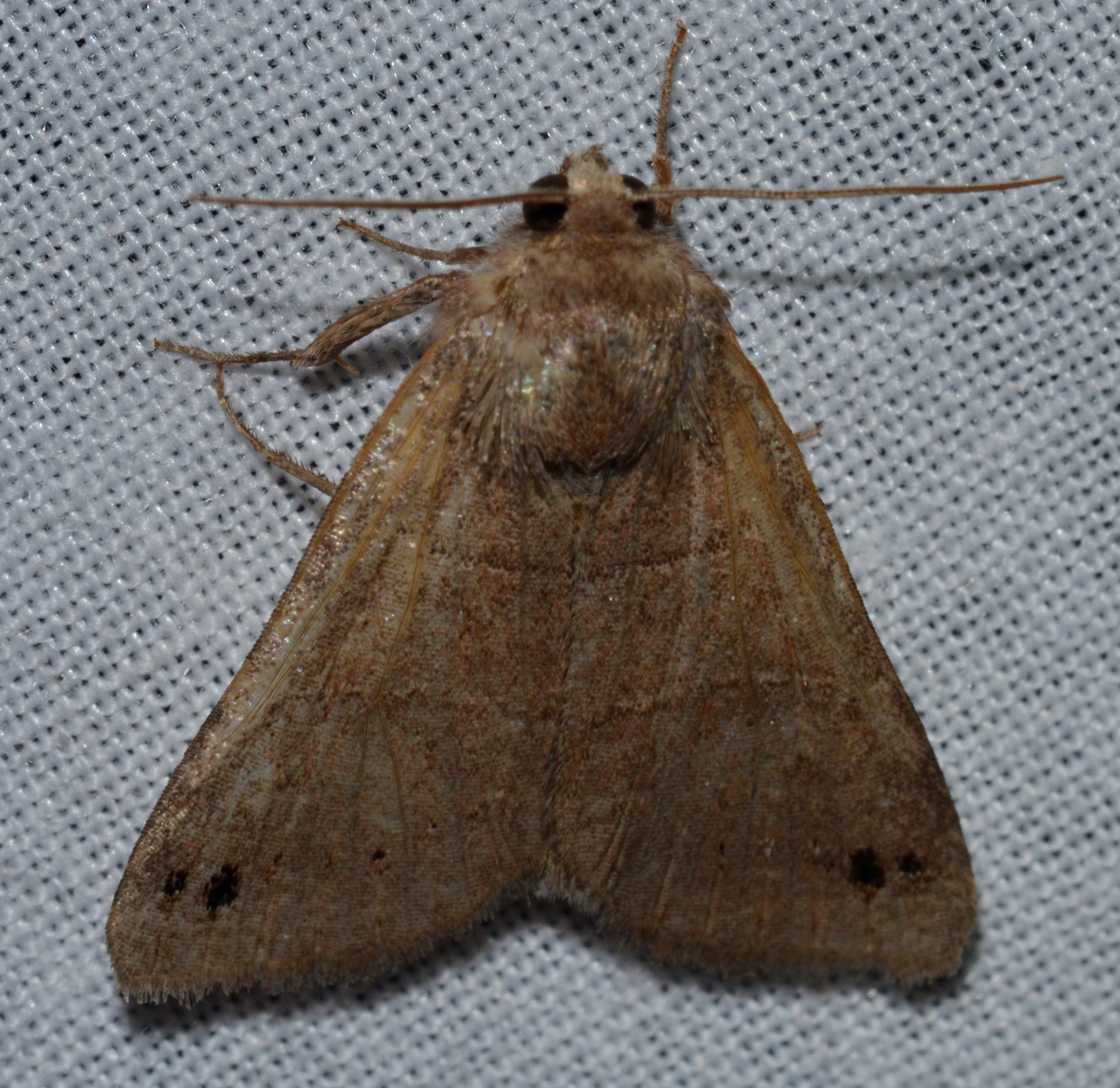
- Cissusa spadix

Scientific classification
- Kingdom: Animalia
- Phylum: Arthropoda
- Clade: Pancrustacea
- Class: Insecta
- Order: Lepidoptera
- Superfamily: Noctuoidea
- Family: Erebidae
- Tribe: Melipotini
- Genus: Cissusa; Walker, 1856

Synonyms
- Ulosyneda Smith, 1903

= Cissusa =

Genus of moths

Cissusa is a genus of moths in the family Erebidae.

== Species ==
- Cissusa inconspicua (Schaus, 1894)
- Cissusa indiscreta H. Edwards, 1886
- Cissusa mucronata Grote, 1883
- Cissusa spadix Cramer, 1780
- Cissusa valens H. Edwards, 1881

== Former species ==
- Cissusa subtermina (Smith, 1900)
