= Ilyrgis =

Scientific classification
- Kingdom: Animalia
- Phylum: Arthropoda
- Class: Insecta
- Order: Lepidoptera
- Superfamily: Noctuoidea
- Family: Erebidae
- Subfamily: Calpinae
- Genus: Ilyrgis; Walker, 1859

Genus of moths

Ilyrgis is a genus of moths of the family Noctuidae first described by Francis Walker in 1859.

== Description ==
The male has the second joint of palpi reaching vertex of head. Third joint moderate length and naked. Antennae bipectinate (comb like on both sides), with long branches. Thorax and abdomen smoothly scaled. Forewings with arched costa near base and at apex, which is slightly produced. The outer margin excurved at middle. Veins 7 to 10 stalked. A tuft of long scales from base of costa on underside. The retinacular tuft large. Hindwings with veins 3 and 4 stalked and vein 5 from lower angle of cell.

== Species ==
Based on the Global Lepidoptera Names Index:

- Ilyrgis capnosia Hampson, 1926
- Ilyrgis costinotata Hampson, 1926
- Ilyrgis echephurealis Walker, 1859
- Ilyrgis ethiopica Hampson, 1926
- Ilyrgis olivacea Rothschild, 1916
- Ilyrgis perdiceas Schaus, 1916
- Ilyrgis subsignata Mabille, 1900
