= Isoura =

Scientific classification
- Kingdom: Animalia
- Phylum: Arthropoda
- Clade: Pancrustacea
- Class: Insecta
- Order: Lepidoptera
- Superfamily: Noctuoidea
- Family: Erebidae
- Subfamily: Calpinae
- Genus: Isoura; Hampson, 1894

Genus of moths

Isoura is a genus of moths of the family Erebidae. The genus was erected by George Hampson in 1894.

== Species ==
- Isoura fuscicollis Butler, 1889
- Isoura pratti Bethune-Baker, 1906
