= Hyunsoonleella rubra =

Scientific classification
- Domain: Bacteria
- Kingdom: Pseudomonadati
- Phylum: Bacteroidota
- Class: Flavobacteriia
- Order: Flavobacteriales
- Family: Flavobacteriaceae
- Genus: Hyunsoonleella
- Species: H. rubra

Binomial name
- Hyunsoonleella rubra Shi et al. 2017

Type strain
- FA042

Synonyms
- Hyunsoonleella rubrobacteria

Species of bacterium

Hyunsoonleella rubra is a Gram-negative, aerobic and non-motile bacterium from the genus of Hyunsoonleella which has been isolated from marine sediments from the coast of Weihai.
