= Indocala =

Scientific classification
- Kingdom: Animalia
- Phylum: Arthropoda
- Class: Insecta
- Order: Lepidoptera
- Superfamily: Noctuoidea
- Family: Noctuidae (?)
- Subfamily: Catocalinae
- Genus: Indocala; Rose & Srivastava, 1990
- Species: I. punjabensis

Binomial name
- Indocala punjabensis Rose & Srivastava, 1990

Genus of moths

Indocala is a monotypic moth genus of the family Noctuidae. Its only species, Indocala punjabensis, is found in India. Both the genus and the species were first described by H. S. Rose and A. Srivastava in 1990. The specific name comes from the state of Punjab.
