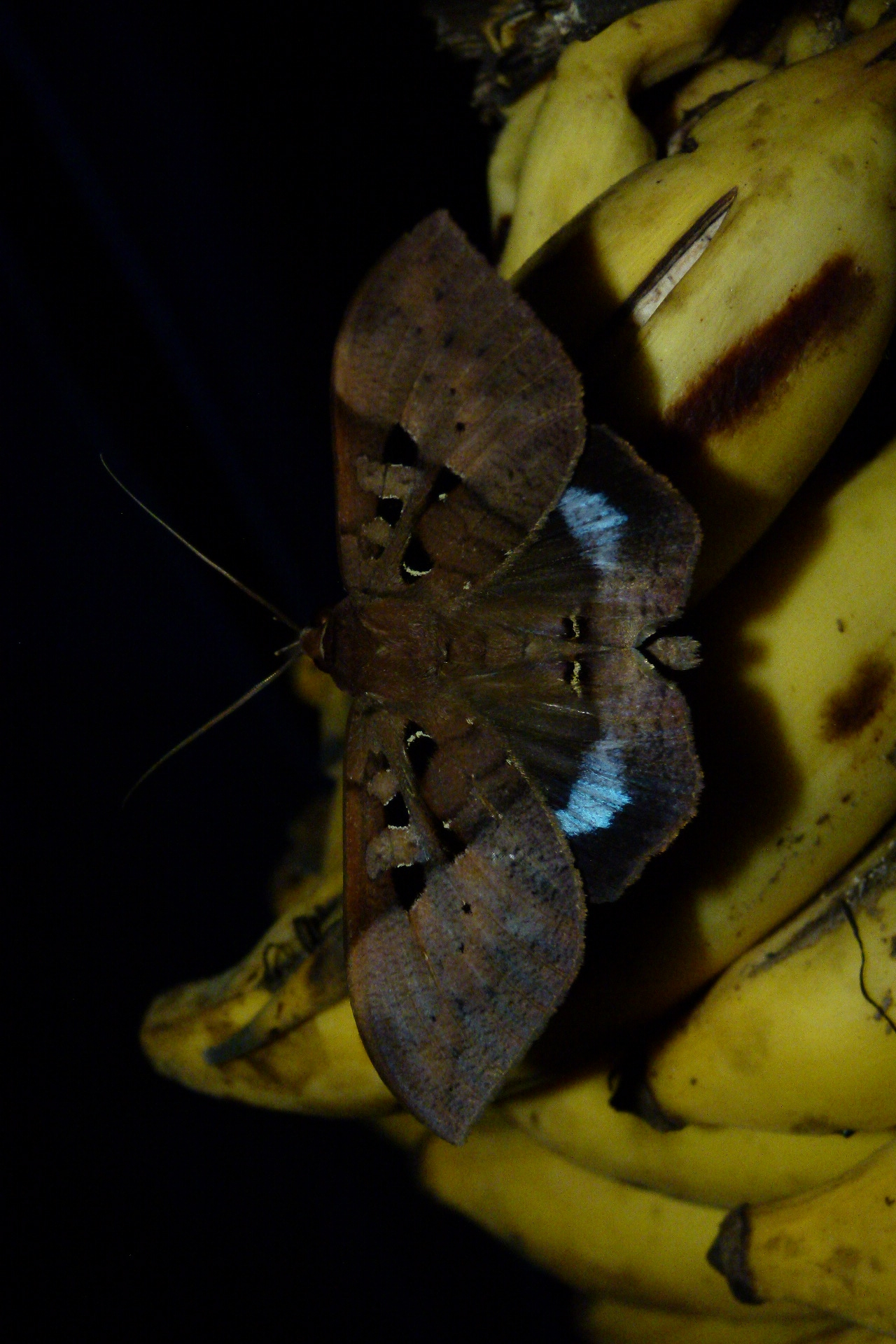
- A species from the Western Ghats (close to I. manlia)

Scientific classification
- Kingdom: Animalia
- Phylum: Arthropoda
- Clade: Pancrustacea
- Class: Insecta
- Order: Lepidoptera
- Superfamily: Noctuoidea
- Family: Noctuidae (?)
- Subfamily: Catocalinae
- Genus: Ischyja; Hübner, [1823]

= Ischyja =

Genus of moths

Ischyja is a genus of moths of the family Noctuidae erected by Jacob Hübner in 1823.

== Description ==
Palpi with second joint broad and rectangularly scaled, reaching vertex of head. Third joint long, naked and oblique. Antennae thickened and fasciculate in male. Thorax and abdomen smoothly scaled. Tibia spineless. Fore tibia with a triangular tuft of hair. Mid-tibia slightly fringed. Hind tibia clothed with long hair. Forewings with highly arched costa towards the apex, which is produced and acute. Outer margin obliquely curved. Hindwings with very short cell. Male with veins 2 to 4 running close together to near outer margin. Larva with four pairs of abdominal prolegs.

== Species ==
- Ischyja albata Felder & Rogenhofer, 1874
- Ischyja anna Swinhoe, 1902
- Ischyja ebusa Swinhoe, 1902
- Ischyja ferrifracta Snellen, 1863
- Ischyja gynnis Prout, 1928
- Ischyja hagenii Snellen, 1885
- Ischyja hemiphaea Hampson, 1926
- Ischyja inferna Swinhoe, 1902
- Ischyja manlia Cramer, 1776
- Ischyja manlioides Prout, 1928
- Ischyja marapok
- Ischyja neocherina Butler, 1877
- Ischyja paraplesius Rothschild, 1920
- Ischyja subreducta
