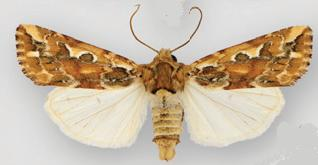

Scientific classification
- Kingdom: Animalia
- Phylum: Arthropoda
- Clade: Pancrustacea
- Class: Insecta
- Order: Lepidoptera
- Superfamily: Noctuoidea
- Family: Noctuidae
- Genus: Hypotrix
- Species: H. optima

Binomial name
- Hypotrix optima (Dyar, [1920])

Synonyms
- Scriptania optima Dyar, [1920]; Hexorthodes optima (Dyar, [1920])

= Hypotrix optima =

Species of moth

Hypotrix optima is a moth of the family Noctuidae found in south-eastern Arizona and central New Mexico southward to Mexico City.

The length of the forewings is 11–14 mm. Adults are on wing from mid-June to mid-July.
