= Imosca =

Scientific classification
- Kingdom: Animalia
- Phylum: Arthropoda
- Clade: Pancrustacea
- Class: Insecta
- Order: Lepidoptera
- Superfamily: Noctuoidea
- Family: Noctuidae
- Genus: Imosca; Sugi, 1984

Genus of moths

Imosca is a genus of moths of the family Noctuidae.

== Species ==
- Imosca coreana (Matsumura, 1926)
- Imosca hoenei (Bang-Haas, 1927)
- Imosca sugii (Kobes, 1984)
