= Iodopepla =

Scientific classification
- Kingdom: Animalia
- Phylum: Arthropoda
- Clade: Pancrustacea
- Class: Insecta
- Order: Lepidoptera
- Superfamily: Noctuoidea
- Family: Noctuidae
- Tribe: Actinotiini
- Genus: Iodopepla; Franclemont, 1964

Genus of moths

Iodopepla is a genus of moths native to the US commonwealth of Massachusetts. It belongs to the family Noctuidae.

== Species ==
- Iodopepla alayoi Todd, 1964
- Iodopepla u-album (Guenée, 1852)
