= Algibacter aestuarii =

Scientific classification
- Domain: Bacteria
- Kingdom: Pseudomonadati
- Phylum: Bacteroidota
- Class: Flavobacteriia
- Order: Flavobacteriales
- Family: Flavobacteriaceae
- Genus: Algibacter
- Species: A. aestuarii

Binomial name
- Algibacter aestuarii (Park et al. 2013) Park et al. 2013

Synonyms
- Hyunsoonleella aestuarii Algibacter marinus

Species of bacterium

Algibacter aestuarii is a gram-negative bacterium from the genus Algibacter.
