= Uzinia =

Scientific classification
- Domain: Eukaryota
- Kingdom: Animalia
- Phylum: Arthropoda
- Class: Insecta
- Order: Lepidoptera
- Superfamily: Noctuoidea
- Family: Erebidae
- Subfamily: Calpinae
- Genus: Uzinia; Schaus, 1913
- Species: U. hyas

Binomial name
- Uzinia hyas Schaus, 1913

Genus of moths

Uzinia is a monotypic moth genus of the family Erebidae. Its only species, Uzinia hyas, is found in Costa Rica. Both the genus and the species were first described by William Schaus in 1913.
