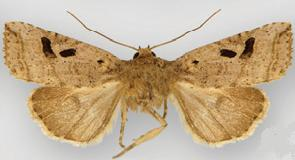

Scientific classification
- Kingdom: Animalia
- Phylum: Arthropoda
- Class: Insecta
- Order: Lepidoptera
- Superfamily: Noctuoidea
- Family: Noctuidae
- Genus: Hypotrix
- Species: H. purpurigera

Binomial name
- Hypotrix purpurigera Guenée, 1852

= Hypotrix purpurigera =

Species of moth

Hypotrix purpurigera is a moth of the family Noctuidae. It is found in Brazil. It is the type species of the genus Hypotrix.
