= Ilsea =

Scientific classification
- Domain: Eukaryota
- Kingdom: Animalia
- Phylum: Arthropoda
- Class: Insecta
- Order: Lepidoptera
- Superfamily: Noctuoidea
- Family: Erebidae
- Subfamily: Calpinae
- Genus: Ilsea; Schaus, 1906

Genus of moths

Ilsea is a genus of moths of the family Erebidae. The genus was described by William Schaus in 1906.

== Species ==
- Ilsea bormia Schaus, 1906
- Ilsea dilucida Schaus, 1914
- Ilsea minuta H. Druce, 1898
- Ilsea subgeminata Schaus, 1914
