= Insolentipalpus =

Scientific classification
- Domain: Eukaryota
- Kingdom: Animalia
- Phylum: Arthropoda
- Class: Insecta
- Order: Lepidoptera
- Superfamily: Noctuoidea
- Family: Erebidae
- Subfamily: Herminiinae
- Genus: Insolentipalpus; Bethune-Baker, 1908

Genus of moths

Insolentipalpus is a genus of moths of the family Erebidae. The genus was erected by George Thomas Bethune-Baker in 1908.

== Species ==
- Insolentipalpus acypera (Hampson, 1896)
- Insolentipalpus biagi (Bethune-Baker, 1908)
- Insolentipalpus mesogramma (Hampson, 1912)
- Insolentipalpus ochreopunctata Bethune-Baker, 1908
