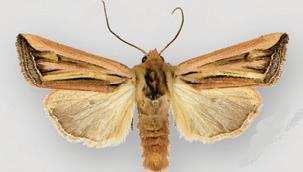
- Male
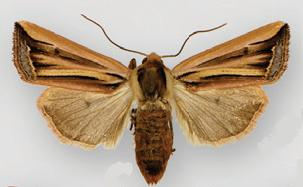
- Female

Scientific classification
- Kingdom: Animalia
- Phylum: Arthropoda
- Clade: Pancrustacea
- Class: Insecta
- Order: Lepidoptera
- Superfamily: Noctuoidea
- Family: Noctuidae
- Genus: Hypotrix
- Species: H. ferricola

Binomial name
- Hypotrix ferricola (Smith, 1905)

Synonyms
- Leucania ferricola Smith, 1905; Trichorthosia ferricola (Smith, 1905)

= Hypotrix ferricola =

Species of moth

Hypotrix ferricola is a moth of the family Noctuidae first described by Smith in 1905. It is found in southern North America from south-eastern Arizona, south-western New Mexico and northern Mexico.

== Description ==
Hypotrix ferricola features an unmistakeable orange and black streaked forewing pattern.

H. ferricola is closely related to the mexican Hypotrix aselenographa (Dyar, 1916); the two can be distinguished using the subterminal line, which on H. ferricola runs parallel to the wing margin before curving out near the forewing apex (on H. aselenographa it is nearly straight to the forewing). H. ferricola also features visible orbicular and reniform spots; on H. aselenographa these spots are completely obscured.

== Ecology and behavior ==
Most records are from ponderosa pine forests. Adults are on wing from early April to early August possibly representing several generations.
