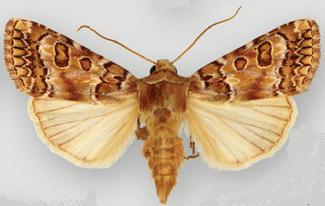

Scientific classification
- Kingdom: Animalia
- Phylum: Arthropoda
- Clade: Pancrustacea
- Class: Insecta
- Order: Lepidoptera
- Superfamily: Noctuoidea
- Family: Noctuidae
- Genus: Hypotrix
- Species: H. hueco

Binomial name
- Hypotrix hueco (Barnes, 1904)

Synonyms
- Mamestra hueco Barnes, 1904; Hexorthodes hueco (Barnes, 1904)

= Hypotrix hueco =

Species of moth

Hypotrix hueco is a moth of the family Noctuidae first described by William Barnes in 1904. It is known only from south-eastern Arizona in the United States.

Adults are on wing from mid-June to mid-August.

== Taxon ==
Hypotrix hueco was originally described using the name Mamestra hueco. In 2010, based on novel morphological and phylogenetic analysis, Mamestra hueco was transferred to genus Hypotrix.

== Description ==
The length of the forewings is 14–16 mm. The medial area is pale with whitish shading; basal and subterminal areas are darker. The subterminal area is very narrow; about as wide as the terminal area.
