= List of noctuid genera: Z =

The huge moth family Noctuidae contains the following genera:

A B C D E F G H I J K L M N O P Q R S T U V W X Y Z

- Zacthys
- Zagira
- Zagorista
- Zalaca
- Zale
- Zaleodes
- Zaleops
- Zalissa
- Zanclognatha
- Zanclopalpus
- Zanclostathme
- Zarima
- Zatilpa
- Zazanisa
- Zebeeba
- Zekelita
- Zelicodes
- Zellerminia
- Zenomia
- Zeteolyga
- Zethes
- Zethesides
- Zeuxinia
- Ziela
- Zigera
- Zinna
- Zirona
- Zitna
- Ziza
- Zobia
- Zonoplusia
- Zophochroa
- Zorothis
- Zorzines
- Zosichrysia
- Zosteropoda
- Zotheca
- Zurobata
- Zutragum
