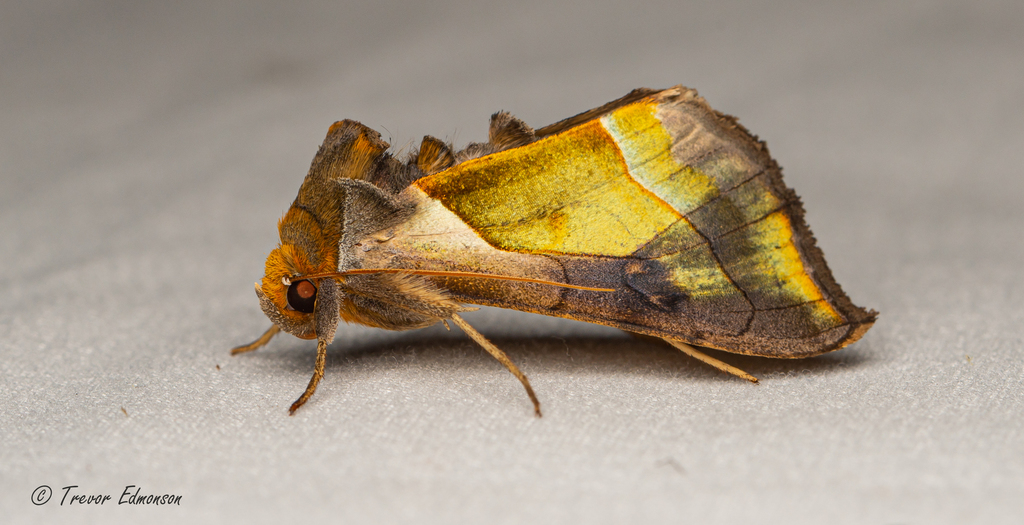

Scientific classification
- Kingdom: Animalia
- Phylum: Arthropoda
- Class: Insecta
- Order: Lepidoptera
- Superfamily: Noctuoidea
- Family: Noctuidae
- Genus: Diachrysia
- Species: D. balluca

Binomial name
- Diachrysia balluca Geyer, 1832

= Diachrysia balluca =

Species of moth

Diachrysia balluca (Geyer, 1832), commonly known as the green-patched looper or hologram moth, is a moth of the family Noctuidae. The species was first described by scientific illustrator Carl Geyer in 1832.

== Physical description ==
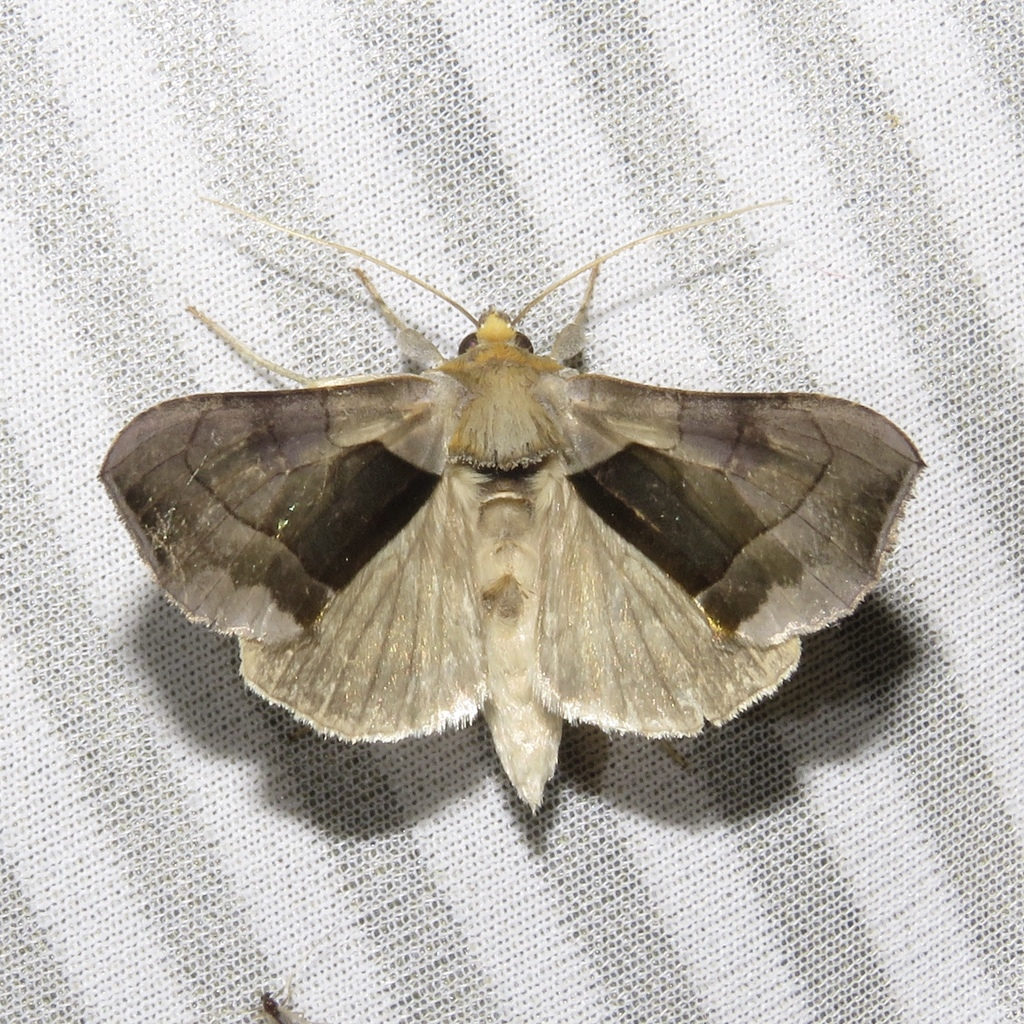
Dorsal image of Diachrysia balluca photographed by Dan MacNeil, exported from iNaturalist.

Diachrysia balluca is a large (20.0-25.0 mm forewing length) grey to brown moth with pointed forewings. The forewings possess metallic green patches over the outer two-thirds, and the hindwings are grey and unmarked. The underside of the thorax is white, and the prothorax is brown to yellow. Diachrysia balluca is the largest plusiine in North America.

Information regarding the larval form of Diachrysia balluca is limited. Most larvae in the subfamily Plusiinae lack prolegs on abdominal segments three and four. This results in a 'looping motion' of their abdomen during movement much like inchworms. This subfamily is also characterized by upturned labial palps above the eye, large scale tufts on the thorax, dorsal scale tufts on one or more abdominal segments, and a quadrifid hindwing.

== Geographic range ==
Diachrysia balluca occurs in northeastern North America, west from Nova Scotia to Manitoba and south to North Carolina. The species' southern limit is The Great Smoky Mountains National Park in the southeastern United States. However, the first recorded specimen of this species was found in Georgia in 1832, and one specimen was recorded in northwestern Florida in 1965.

== Habitat ==
Diachrysia balluca inhabits mature poplar and mixedwood forest in northeastern North America.

== Development ==
Members of the family Noctuidae are holometabolous, meaning they have four life stages: egg, larva, pupa and adult.

== Reproduction ==
=== Mating systems ===
Although there is limited data on the specific reproductive cycle of Diachrysia balluca, a 1978 study by Eichlin and Cunningham reared and observed Plusiinae specimens from Canada and the Southeastern United States in a laboratory setting. According to the study, adults typically mate the second day following emergence, and multiple matings occur regularly amongst this subfamily. Females produce a sex pheromone to attract males. Males emit a volatile chemical from hair pencils on their abdomen to aid in mating, which may serve as a recognition signal for mating partners. Females deposit between 200 and 300 eggs during her lifetime. Canadian woodnettle is a known host for Diachrysia balluca broods.

=== General behaviour ===
Although there is limited data on the lifespan of Diachrysia balluca, a 1978 study by Eichlin and Cunningham recorded the development of Plusiinae specimens from Canada and the Southeastern United States reared in a laboratory setting. The average developmental time from egg to adult was found to be thirty days. Most species passed through five instars, with each stage requiring three to five days. The prepupal stage lasted 1 to 2 days, and adults emerged after 8 days following pupation. There is one single brood per year.

== Lifespan ==
Adult specimens have been observed from May through September, with the most observations occurring during the month of July. Observation of larvae is sparse, but this may be attributed to the larvae being small in size and rather inconspicuous, whereas the adults are larger and more visually striking.

== Behaviour ==
As a member of the Noctuidae family, Diachrysia balluca is a nocturnal species, often flying solely at night.

== Senses and communication ==
Diachrysia balluca possesses a tympanal organ for sound reception. Moths possess a simple tympanal organ that responds to alternating pressures of sound waves.

Moths also possess refractive superposition eyes, a type of compound eye found mostly in nocturnal insects.

== Food habits ==
Diachrysia balluca feeds on woody plants including common hop, quaking aspen, Canadian woodnettle and species of the genus Rubus.

Adults are also known to visit flowers of the family Asteraceae.

== Predation ==
Although there is minimal data regarding the predation of this species, there is evidence that iridescence in moths is linked to predator evasion. Although this may seem counterintuitive, some iridescence may serve as an optical illusion to escape the notice of predators. Iridescence may also play a role in species recognition and courtship.

== Ecosystem roles ==
There is limited data regarding the ecosystem role of this species.

== Economic importance ==
While there is limited data regarding the economic impact of Diachrysia balluca, larvae of the subfamily Plusiinae have been known to damage crops, vegetables, greenhouse plants and ornamental herbs.

== Conservation status ==
There is no listed conservation status for this species.

== Taxonomic status ==
Diachrysia balluca is considered a scientifically accepted species in the field of entomology, meeting established criteria for species distinction as of September 2023.

== Genetic data ==
Diachrysia balluca is assigned a unique Barcode Index Number (BIN) on BOLD (Biodiversity of Life Database). You can explore the species-specific information and genetic data by visiting the BOLD page for TaxID: 21796, which includes details about its genetic characteristics and distribution.

As of September 28, 2023, there are a total of nine genetic sequences available for Diachrysia balluca on NCBI (National Center for Biotechnology Information) (NCBI:txid689076). These sequences can be accessed for detailed genetic analysis and research purposes.

Some species within the subfamily Plusiinae share almost identical genetic sequences. For example, Diachrysia stenochrysis and Diachrysia chrysitis are often difficult to be discriminated from each other based on external appearance, and possess a minimum pairwise divergence of a mere 0.93%. This is important to note when examining genetic data associated with this subfamily.

== Information Resources ==
Genetic data, distribution records and taxonomic details of Diachrysia balluca are available through the Biodiversity of Life Database (BOLD) and the Global Biodiversity Information Facility (GBIF).

Sequence data for Diachrysia balluca is accessible through the National Center for Biotechnology Information (NCBI).

Catalogue of Life (CoL), Integrated Taxonomic Information System (ITIS) and the Global Lepidoptera Names Index (LepIndex) hold taxonomic and nomenclature data about Diachrysia balluca.

Additionally, research-grade observations on iNaturalist provide valuable field data.

See the 'Taxon identifiers' box below for links and accession numbers for these sources.

Other sources are also provided below by Wikipedia, such as Butterflies and Moths of North America (BAMONA), BugGuide, Interim Register of Marine and Nonmarine Genera (IRMNG), Moth Photographers Group (MPG), and NatureServe; however, the accuracy of information from these sources may vary.
