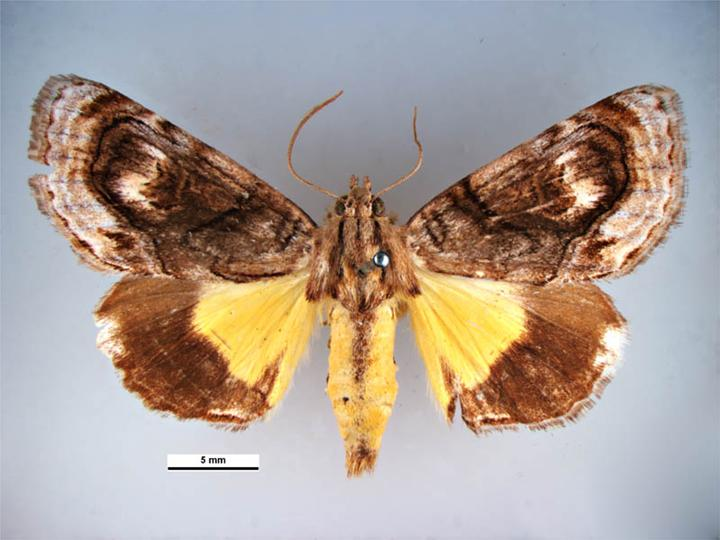
- Dorsal view
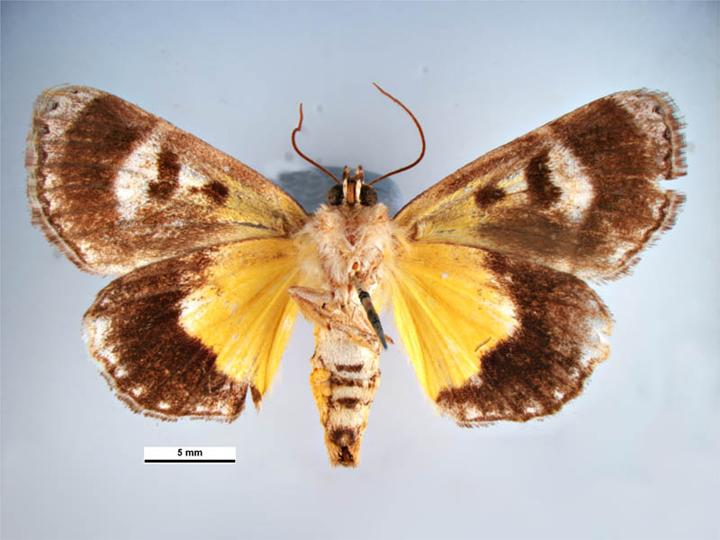
- Ventral view

Scientific classification
- Kingdom: Animalia
- Phylum: Arthropoda
- Class: Insecta
- Order: Lepidoptera
- Superfamily: Noctuoidea
- Family: Noctuidae
- Genus: Zalissa
- Species: Z. catocalina

Binomial name
- Zalissa catocalina Walker, 1865

Synonyms
- Hypocala pratti Bethune-Baker, 1906; Zalissa pratti (Bethune-Baker, 1906)

= Zalissa catocalina =

Species of moth

Zalissa catocalina is a moth of the family Noctuidae first described by Francis Walker in 1865. It is found in Papua New Guinea and Australia. In Australia, it is found in or near rainforests in eastern Australia as far south as northern New South Wales.

== Gallery ==
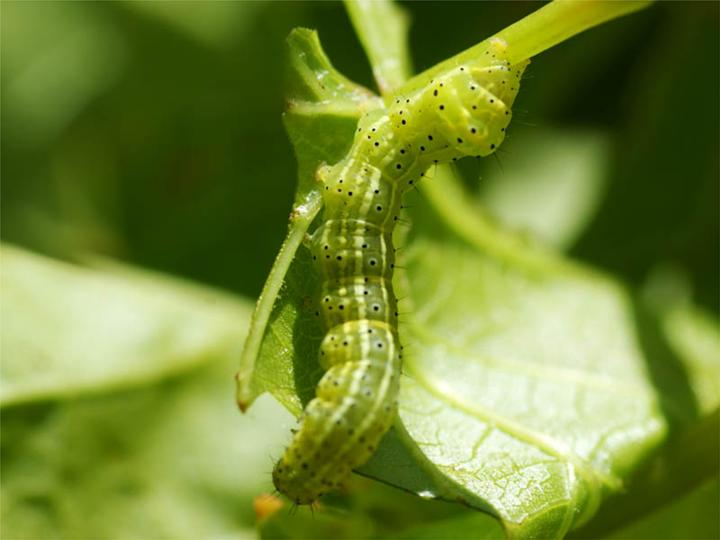
Larva

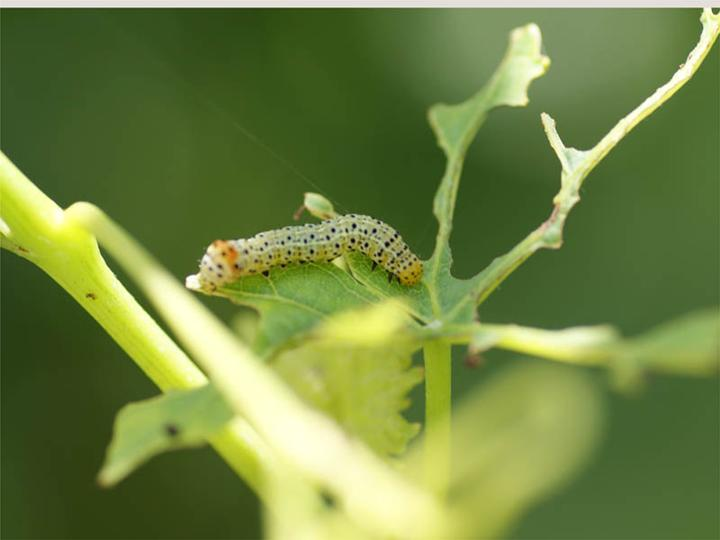
Larva
