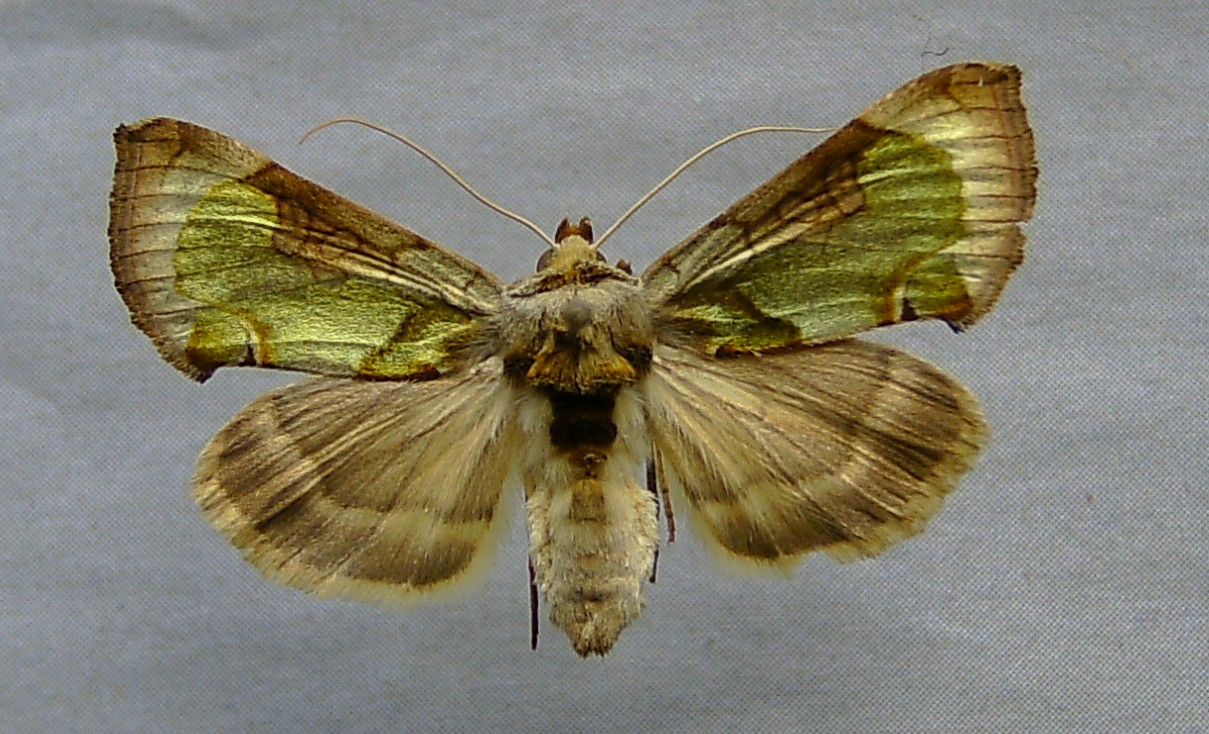

Scientific classification
- Domain: Eukaryota
- Kingdom: Animalia
- Phylum: Arthropoda
- Class: Insecta
- Order: Lepidoptera
- Superfamily: Noctuoidea
- Family: Noctuidae
- Genus: Diachrysia
- Species: D. zosimi

Binomial name
- Diachrysia zosimi (Hübner, 1822)

Synonyms
- Noctua zosimi; Plusia zosimi; Phytometra zosimi

= Diachrysia zosimi =

Species of moth

Diachrysia zosimi is a species of moth of the family Noctuidae. It is found in Eastern Europe and bordering regions, such as Poland, Northern Italy, Bulgaria, Ukraine, and Southern Siberia.

== Description ==
The wingspan is 32–42 mm. Warren (1914) states P. zosimi Hbn. (64 e). Forewing glossy green, the costal and terminal areas narrowly brownish; a diffuse brown costal triangle containing the 3 dark-edged stigmata; a dark somewhat hook shaped mark on inner margin represents the outer lower portion of basal patch: the bright green area is limited outwardly by a widely outcurved outer line, which is preceded on inner margin by a dark triangular mark, and followed by a small dark blotch at anal angle; hindwing shining pale fuscous, with darker outer line and terminal border separated by a paler band. A local species found in Piedmont, Galicia, the Dobrulscha, and the Ural Mts.; also in the Altai Mts., W. Siberia, in Amurland, and Japan.

== Biology ==
Adults fly from June to August in two generations and sometimes also from September to October in a third generation.

The larvae feed on Sanguisorba species, such as Sanguisorba officinalis and sometimes Parnassia palustris.
