= Zosichrysia =

Scientific classification
- Domain: Eukaryota
- Kingdom: Animalia
- Phylum: Arthropoda
- Class: Insecta
- Order: Lepidoptera
- Superfamily: Noctuoidea
- Family: Noctuidae
- Subfamily: Plusiinae
- Genus: Zosichrysia; Beck, 1996

Genus of moths

Zosichrysia is a genus or subgenus of moths of the family Noctuidae. It is sometimes treated as a subgenus of Diachrysia. According to Beck, it should be treated as a valid genus.
