= Metachrostis velocior =

Scientific classification
- Domain: Eukaryota
- Kingdom: Animalia
- Phylum: Arthropoda
- Class: Insecta
- Order: Lepidoptera
- Superfamily: Noctuoidea
- Family: Erebidae
- Genus: Metachrostis
- Species: M. velocior

Binomial name
- Metachrostis velocior (Staudinger, 1892)

Synonyms
- Thalpochares velox velocior Staudiger, 1892; Eublemma velocior deserta Amsel, 1935

Species of moth

Metachrostis velocior is a species of moth of the family Erebidae. It was described by Otto Staudinger in 1892. It is found on Malta, Crete and Cyprus, as well as in southern Italy, Greece, Turkey and the Middle East.
