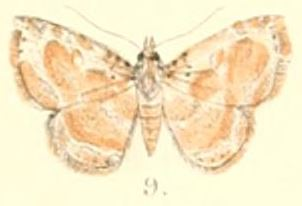

Scientific classification
- Domain: Eukaryota
- Kingdom: Animalia
- Phylum: Arthropoda
- Class: Insecta
- Order: Lepidoptera
- Superfamily: Noctuoidea
- Family: Erebidae
- Genus: Zurobata
- Species: Z. reticulata

Binomial name
- Zurobata reticulata (Moore, 1882)

Synonyms
- Selenis reticulata Moore, 1882

= Zurobata reticulata =

Species of moth

Zurobata reticulata is a moth of the family Erebidae first described by Frederic Moore in 1882. It is found in India.
