= Metachrostis egens =

Scientific classification
- Domain: Eukaryota
- Kingdom: Animalia
- Phylum: Arthropoda
- Class: Insecta
- Order: Lepidoptera
- Superfamily: Noctuoidea
- Family: Erebidae
- Genus: Metachrostis
- Species: M. egens

Binomial name
- Metachrostis egens (Moore, [1884])

Synonyms
- Chlumetia egens Moore, [1884]

Species of moth

Metachrostis egens is a moth of the family Erebidae first described by Frederic Moore in 1884. It is found in Sri Lanka.
