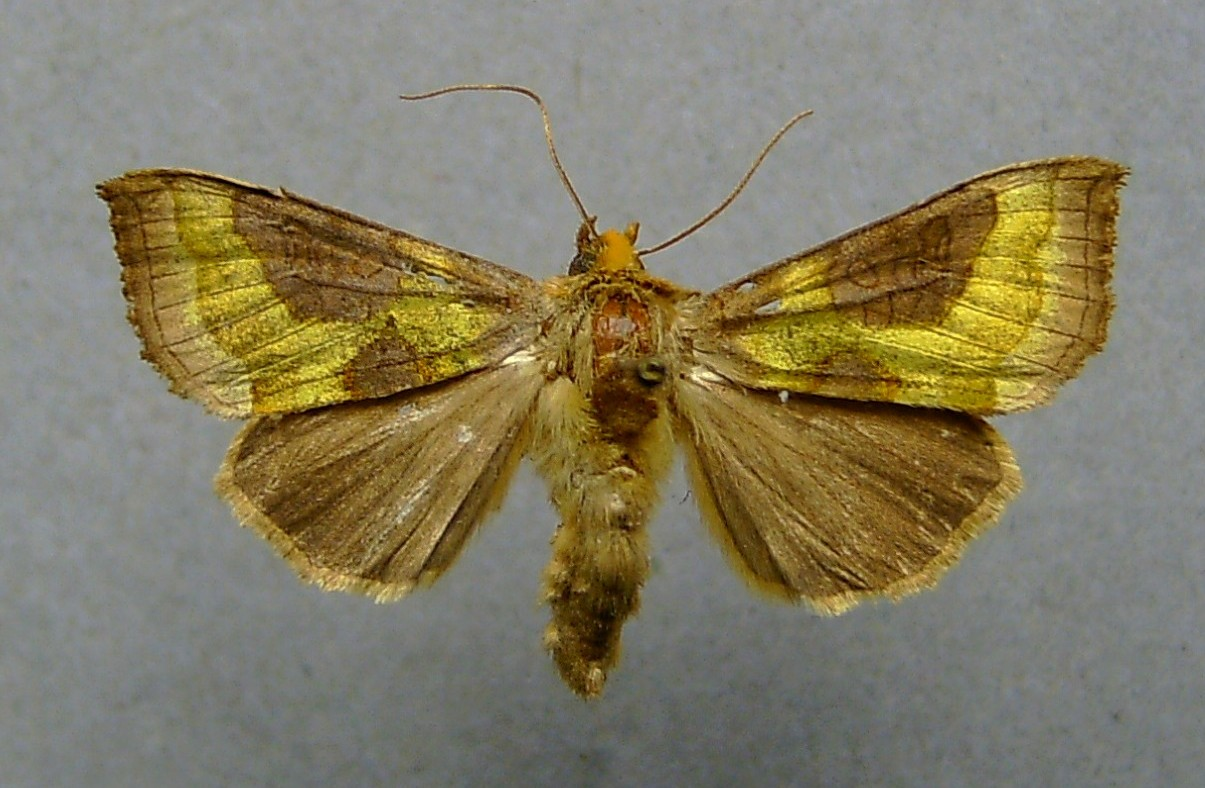

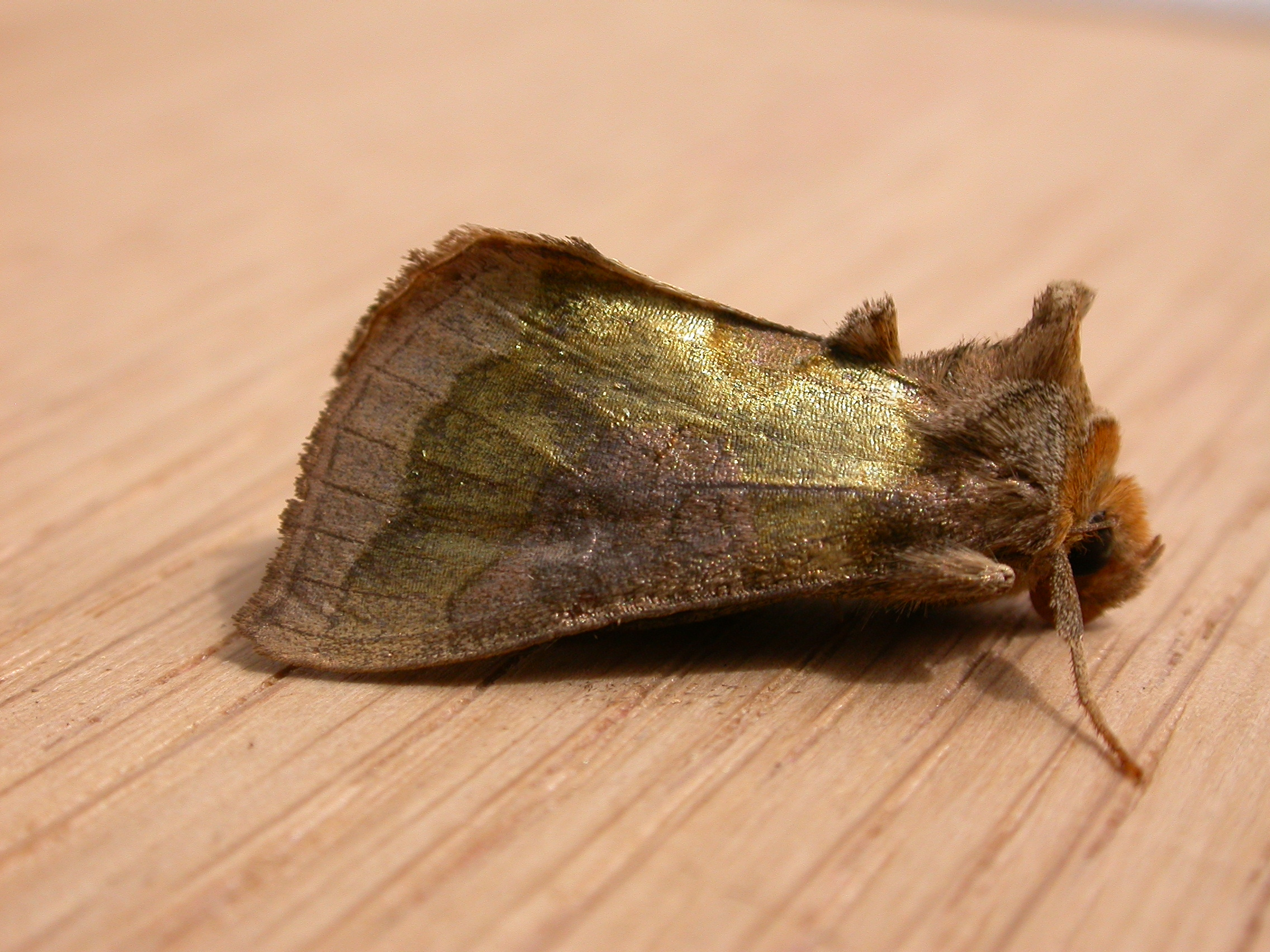

Scientific classification
- Domain: Eukaryota
- Kingdom: Animalia
- Phylum: Arthropoda
- Class: Insecta
- Order: Lepidoptera
- Superfamily: Noctuoidea
- Family: Noctuidae
- Genus: Diachrysia
- Species: D. stenochrysis

Binomial name
- Diachrysia stenochrysis (Warren, 1913)

Synonyms
- Diachrysia tutti; Phytometra stenochrysis; Plusia tutti; Phytometra multauri

= Diachrysia stenochrysis =

Species of moth

Diachrysia stenochrysis is a species of moth of the family Noctuidae. It is found in Europe, the Caucasus, the Far East, Primorye, Ussuri, Korea, Manchuria, Mongolia, Transbaikalia, Siberia and Japan.

The wingspan is 32–34 mm. Warren (1914) states (original description) P. stenochrysis spec. nov. (64 f). As large as or larger than Diachrysia chrysitis, but with the forewing narrower;the costal portion of median fascia with conversely oblique edges, and nearly twice as wide on costa as in Diachrysia nadeja Oberthür, 1880. Several examples from Ichikishiri, Yesso, in Tring Museum.

The larvae feed on Urtica species and other plants.
