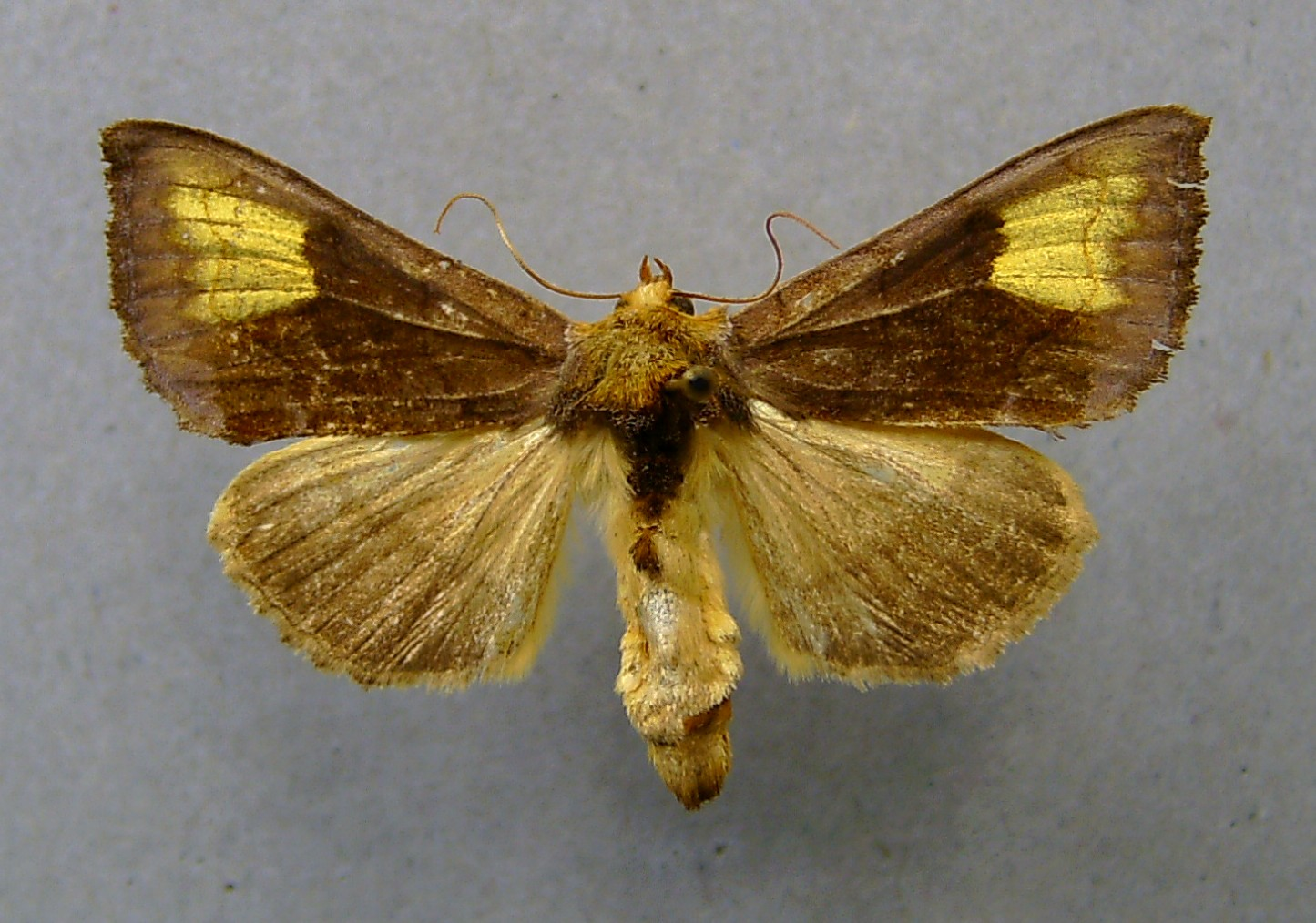

Scientific classification
- Kingdom: Animalia
- Phylum: Arthropoda
- Class: Insecta
- Order: Lepidoptera
- Superfamily: Noctuoidea
- Family: Noctuidae
- Genus: Diachrysia
- Species: D. chryson

Binomial name
- Diachrysia chryson (Esper, 1789)

Synonyms
- Plusia chryson; Phytometra chryson; Autographa chryson; Phalaena chryson; Phalaena aerifera

= Diachrysia chryson =

Scarce burnished brass

Species of moth

Diachrysia chryson, the scarce burnished brass, is a moth of the family Noctuidae. The species was first described by Eugen Johann Christoph Esper in 1789. It is found in central and southern Europe (including the southern part of the British Isles), Asia Minor across the Palearctic to Japan.

== Technical description and variation ==
P.chryson Esp. Forewing brownish fuscous tinged with purple: lines dark brown, inconspicuous; inner line waved, oblique inwards; median line visible only at costa; a large subquadrate shining brassy blotch beyond cell between veins 7 and 3, the space between it and inner margin suffused with deep golden brown, both traversed by the fine outer line, which becomes lustrous towards inner margin; submarginal line very obscure, waved, limiting the brassy and brown patches; hindwing pale bronzy fuscous, darker towards termen. Larva green; dorsal line darker green, white-edged; some oblique whitish lateral stripes; spiracles white. The wingspan is 44–54 mm.

== Biology ==
The moth flies from July to August depending on the location.

The larvae feed on Eupatorium cannabinum.

== Subspecies ==
There are three recognised subspecies:

- Diachrysia chryson chryson
- Diachrysia chryson pales
- Diachrysia chryson deltaica
