= Metachrostis pectinata =

Scientific classification
- Kingdom: Animalia
- Phylum: Arthropoda
- Class: Insecta
- Order: Lepidoptera
- Superfamily: Noctuoidea
- Family: Erebidae
- Genus: Metachrostis
- Species: M. pectinata

Binomial name
- Metachrostis pectinata Hampson, 1907

Species of moth

Metachrostis pectinata is a moth of the family Erebidae first described by George Hampson in 1907. It is found in Sri Lanka.
