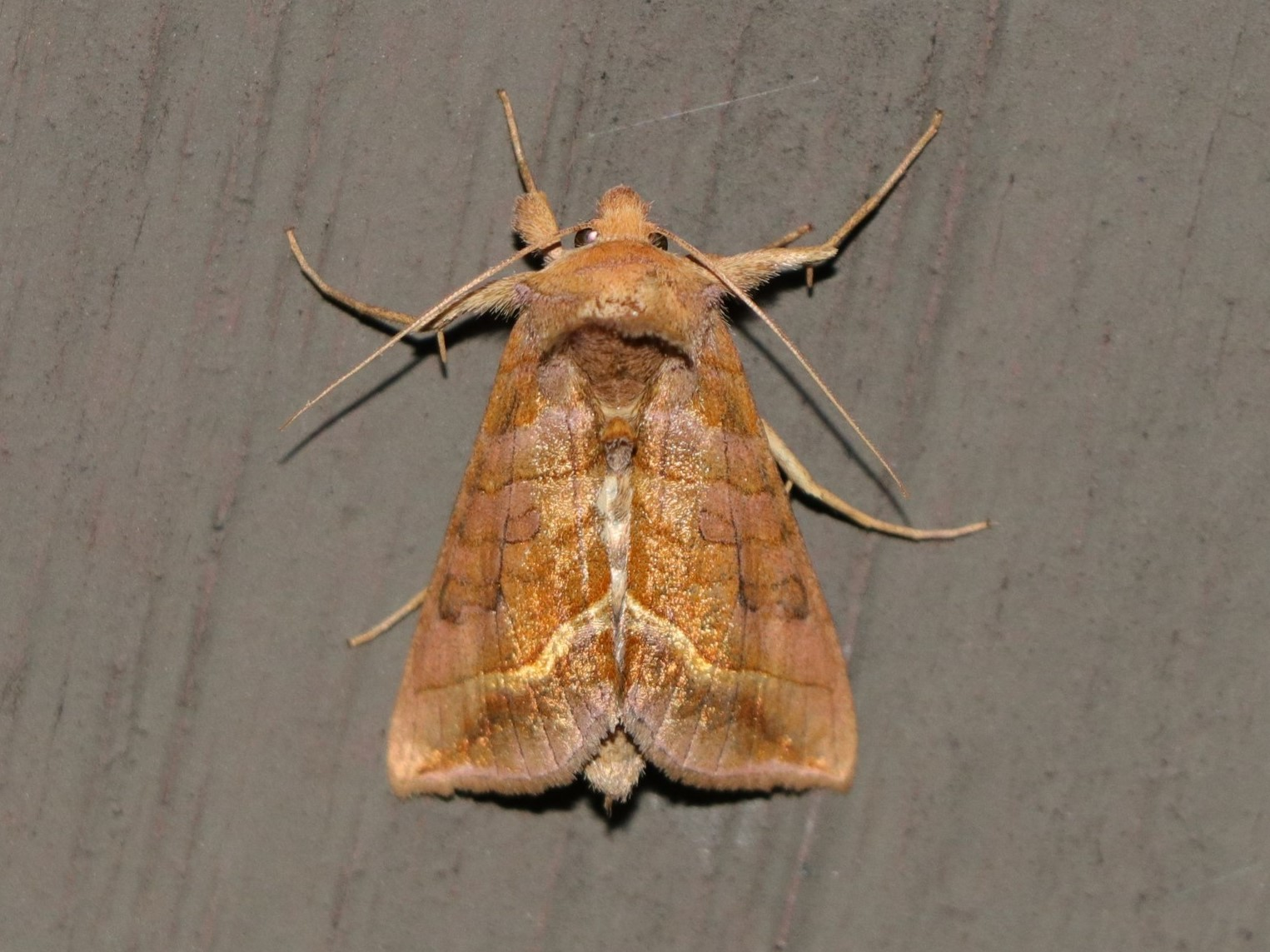

Scientific classification
- Domain: Eukaryota
- Kingdom: Animalia
- Phylum: Arthropoda
- Class: Insecta
- Order: Lepidoptera
- Superfamily: Noctuoidea
- Family: Noctuidae
- Genus: Diachrysia
- Species: D. aereoides

Binomial name
- Diachrysia aereoides (Grote, 1864)

Synonyms
- Plusia aereoides Grote, 1864; Diachrysia aeroides

= Diachrysia aereoides =

Species of moth

Diachrysia aereoides, the dark-spotted looper or lined copper looper, is a moth of the family Noctuidae. The species was first described by Augustus Radcliffe Grote in 1864. It is found in North America from Newfoundland west to northern California. It reaches its southernmost distribution in Great Smoky Mountains National Park.

The wingspan is 28–40 mm. Adults are on wing from June to July. There is one generation per year.

The larvae are probably general feeders on herbaceous and woody plants. Larvae have been recorded on Asteraceae, Lamiaceae and Rosaceae species.
