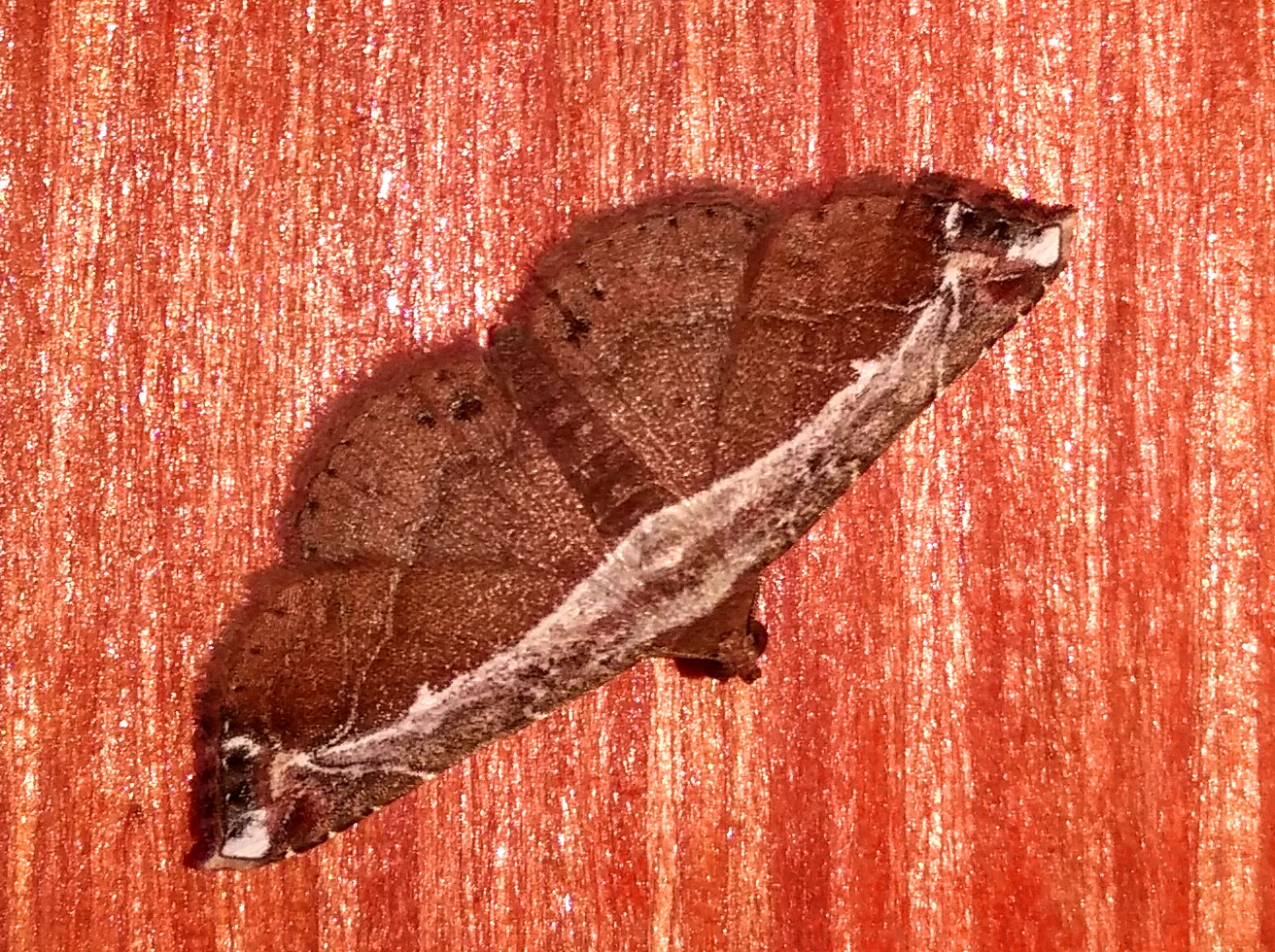

Scientific classification
- Kingdom: Animalia
- Phylum: Arthropoda
- Clade: Pancrustacea
- Class: Insecta
- Order: Lepidoptera
- Superfamily: Noctuoidea
- Family: Erebidae
- Genus: Zurobata
- Species: Z. vacillans

Binomial name
- Zurobata vacillans (Walker, 1864)

Synonyms
- Zurobata aequalis (Walker, 1864); Zurobata inaequalis (Walker, 1864); Zurobata irrecta (Walker, 1865); Zurobata niviapex (Walker, 1865); Zurobata selenicula (Snellen, 1880); Xanthoptera seleniocula Snellen, 1880

= Zurobata vacillans =

Species of moth

Zurobata vacillans is a moth of the family Erebidae first described by Francis Walker in 1864. It is found in the Oriental tropics of India, Sri Lanka, Taiwan and New Guinea.

== Gallery ==
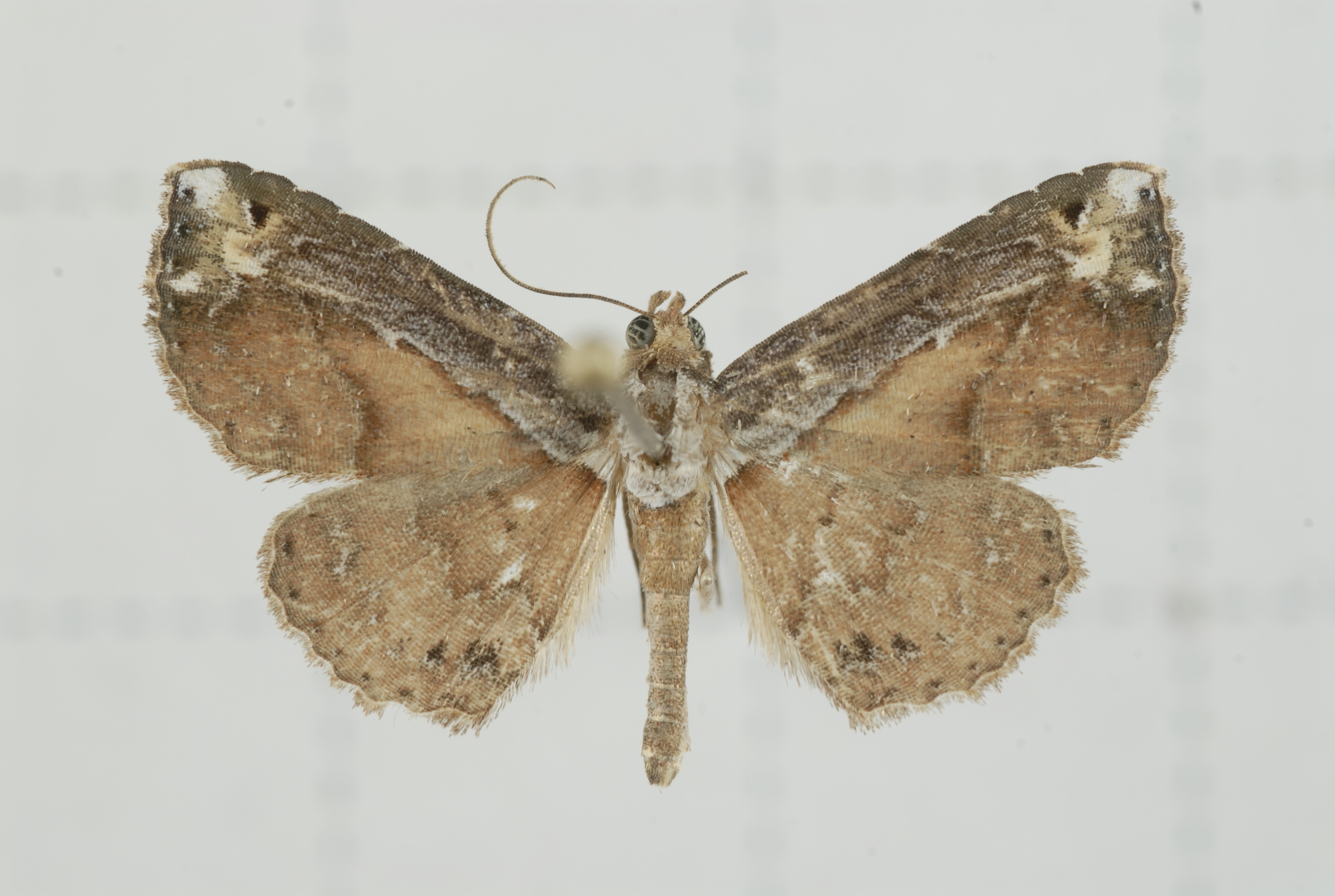

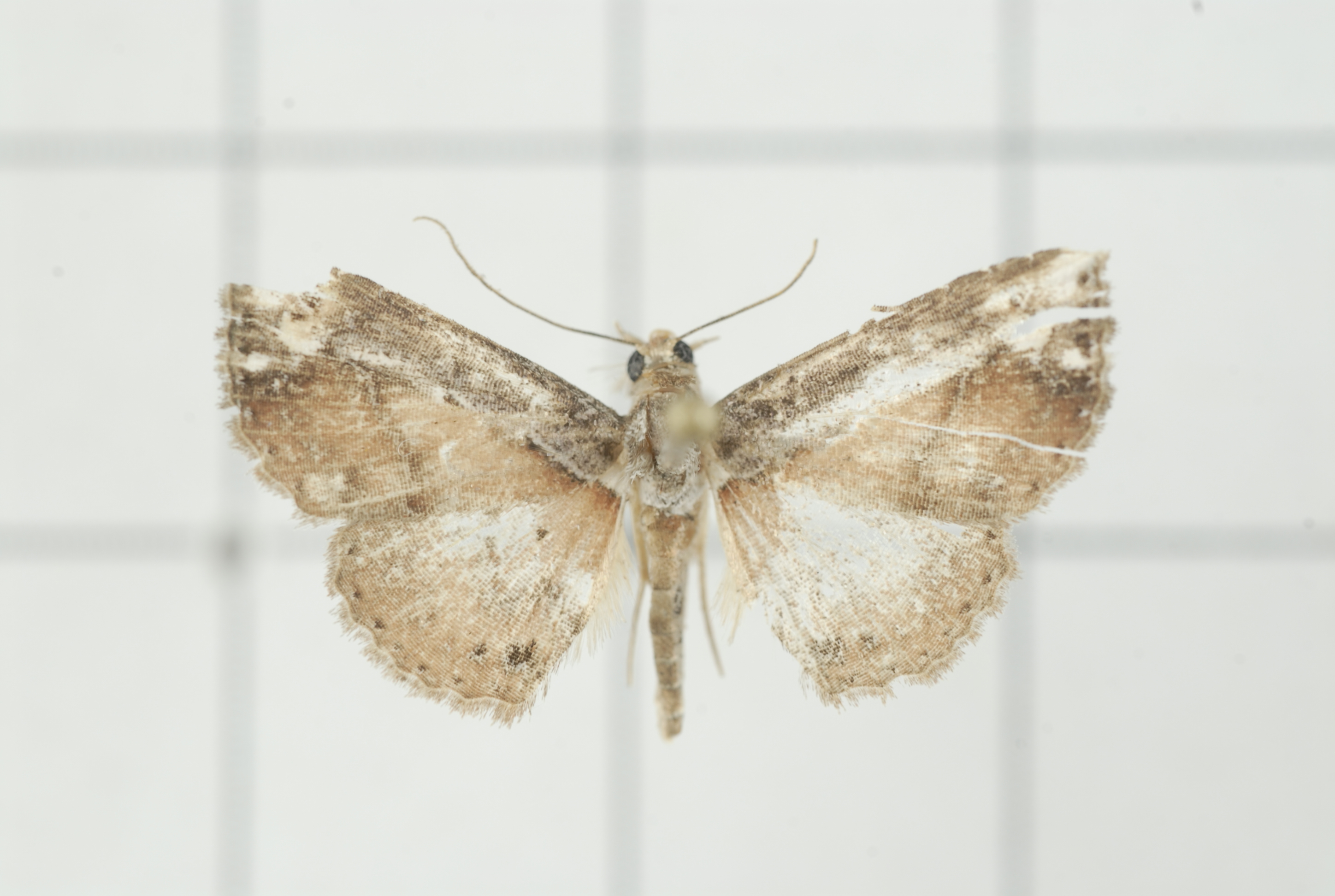

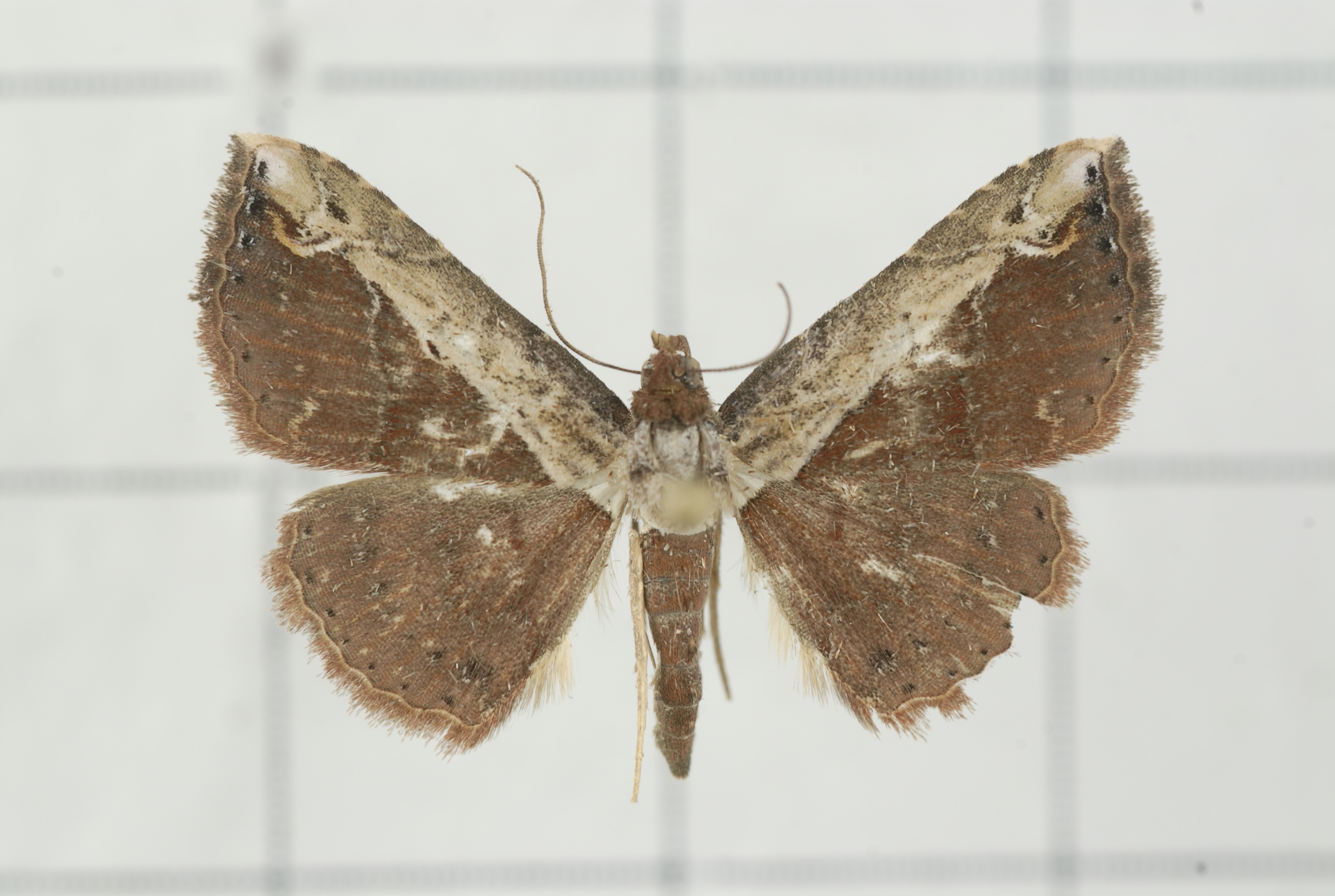

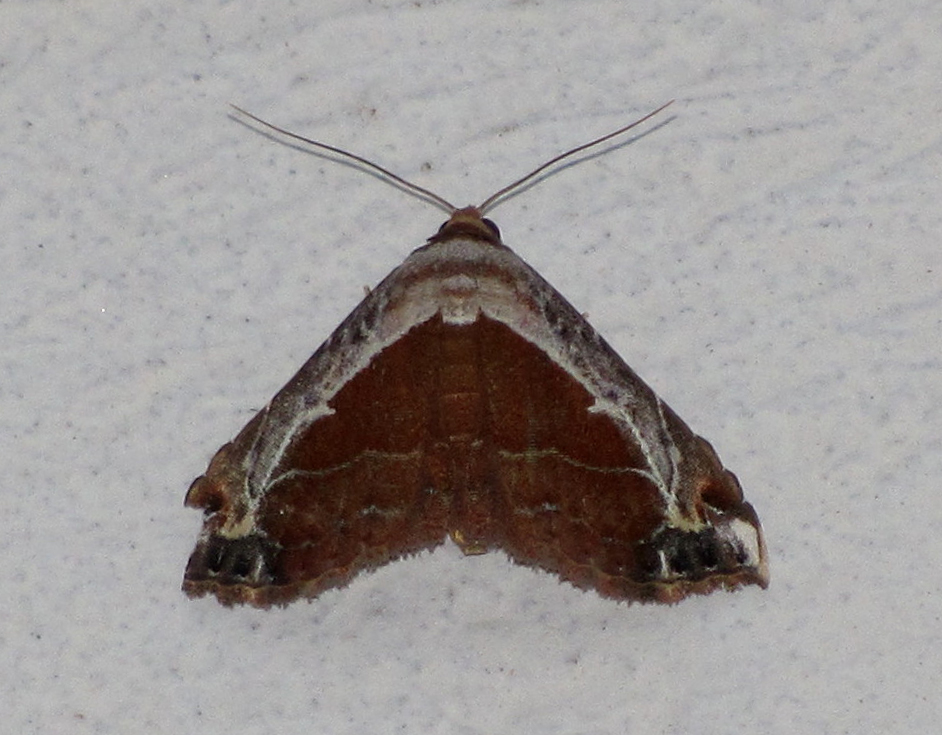
