= Zacthys =

Scientific classification
- Kingdom: Animalia
- Phylum: Arthropoda
- Class: Insecta
- Order: Lepidoptera
- Superfamily: Noctuoidea
- Family: Noctuidae
- Genus: Zacthys; Viette, 1973

Genus of moths

Zacthys is a genus of moths of the family Noctuidae.

== Species ==
- Zacthys biplaga Viette, 1973
