= Zethesides =

Scientific classification
- Kingdom: Animalia
- Phylum: Arthropoda
- Class: Insecta
- Order: Lepidoptera
- Superfamily: Noctuoidea
- Family: Erebidae
- Subfamily: Calpinae
- Genus: Zethesides; Hampson, 1926

Genus of moths

Zethesides is a genus of moths of the family Noctuidae described by George Hampson in 1926.

== Species ==
- Zethesides bettoni (Butler, 1898)
- Zethesides haesitans (Walker, 1858) (syn: Zethesides umbrifera (C. Swinhoe, 1890))
- Zethesides hesperioides (Guenée, 1852)
- Zethesides pusilla Hampson, 1926
- Zethesides serangodes Viette, 1956
- Zethesides simplex D. S. Fletcher, 1955
