= Metachrostis =

Scientific classification
- Kingdom: Animalia
- Phylum: Arthropoda
- Clade: Pancrustacea
- Class: Insecta
- Order: Lepidoptera
- Superfamily: Noctuoidea
- Family: Erebidae
- Subfamily: Boletobiinae
- Genus: Metachrostis; Hübner, [1820]

Synonyms
- Leptosia Guenée, 1841; Zalaca Walker, [1866]; Neoleptosia Koçak, 1980

Genus of moths

Metachrostis is a genus of moths of the family Erebidae first described by Jacob Hübner in 1820.

== Taxonomy ==
The genus has previously been classified in the Eublemminae subfamily of Erebidae or the Acontiinae subfamily of the family Noctuidae.

== Description ==
Palpi long and upturned, reaching above vertex of head. Thorax and abdomen tuftless. Forewings with stalked veins 8,9 and 10. Vein 7 sometimes almost or quite touching vein 8, and forming an areole.

== Species ==
- Metachrostis amanica Osthelder, 1933
- Metachrostis antemediana Hacker, 2011
- Metachrostis anticalis (Walker, [1866])
- Metachrostis anticalis Walker, 1866
- Metachrostis atristipata (Hampson, 1926)
- Metachrostis batanga Draudt, 1950
- Metachrostis bipartita Kononenko & Matov, 2009
- Metachrostis brunea Hampson, 1891
- Metachrostis chalcoscripta Hacker, 2011
- Metachrostis comvelox Hacker, 2011
- Metachrostis contingens Moore, 1888
- Metachrostis costiplaga Warren, 1903
- Metachrostis dardouini Boisduval, 1840
- Metachrostis debivar (Berio, 1947)
- Metachrostis decora Walker, 1869
- Metachrostis djakonovi Kononenko & Matov, 2009
- Metachrostis egens Moore, [1884]
- Metachrostis eupethecica (Hampson, 1910)
- Metachrostis fasciata Hampson, 1891
- Metachrostis forsteri Hacker, 2011
- Metachrostis glaucopuncta Hacker, 2011
- Metachrostis grandivelox Hacker, 2011
- Metachrostis griseimargo Warren, 1912
- Metachrostis hoenei Kononenko & Matov, 2009
- Metachrostis lavinia (Hampson, 1902)
- Metachrostis melabela Hampson, 1910
- Metachrostis miasma Hampson, 1891
- Metachrostis misturata (Hampson, 1910)
- Metachrostis nannata Hampson, 1910
- Metachrostis ochrographa Hacker, 2011
- Metachrostis olmii (Berio, 1937)
- Metachrostis pallidiscripta Hacker, 2011
- Metachrostis parvisi (Berio, 1940)
- Metachrostis paurograpta Butler, 1886
- Metachrostis pectinata Hampson, 1907
- Metachrostis phaeapera (Hampson, 1910)
- Metachrostis phaeographa Hacker, 2011
- Metachrostis politzari Hacker, 2011
- Metachrostis quinaria Moore, 1881
- Metachrostis quinarioides (Berio, 1947)
- Metachrostis remanei Hacker, 2011
- Metachrostis rubripuncta Hampson, 1902
- Metachrostis sciaphora (Hampson, 1910)
- Metachrostis sefidi Brandt, 1938
- Metachrostis sinevi Kononenko & Matov, 2009
- Metachrostis snelleni (Wallengren, 1875)
- Metachrostis stygiodonta (Hampson, 1910)
- Metachrostis subdardouini Hacker, 2011
- Metachrostis subvelox Hacker & Saldaitis, 2010
- Metachrostis thermochroa (Hampson, 1910)
- Metachrostis thermosticta (Hampson, 1910)
- Metachrostis tritonia Hampson, 1902
- Metachrostis velocior Staudinger, 1892
- Metachrostis velox Hübner, 1813
