= Zinna (moth) =

Scientific classification
- Domain: Eukaryota
- Kingdom: Animalia
- Phylum: Arthropoda
- Class: Insecta
- Order: Lepidoptera
- Superfamily: Noctuoidea
- Family: Erebidae
- Subfamily: Calpinae
- Genus: Zinna; Walker, 1869

Genus of moths

Zinna is a genus of moths of the family Erebidae. The genus was erected by Francis Walker in 1869.

The Global Lepidoptera Names Index gives this name as a synonym of Ugia Walker, 1858.

== Species ==
- Zinna nigripalpis Walker, 1869
- Zinna prompta (Walker, 1869)
