= Zaleodes =

Scientific classification
- Kingdom: Animalia
- Phylum: Arthropoda
- Class: Insecta
- Order: Lepidoptera
- Superfamily: Noctuoidea
- Family: Noctuidae (?)
- Subfamily: Catocalinae
- Genus: Zaleodes; Hampson, 1926
- Species: Z. xylochroa

Binomial name
- Zaleodes xylochroa Hampson, 1926

Genus of moths

Zaleodes is a monotypic moth genus of the family Noctuidae. Its only species, Zaleodes xylochroa, is found in Peru. Both the genus and the species were first described by George Hampson in 1926.
