= Zorzines =

Scientific classification
- Domain: Eukaryota
- Kingdom: Animalia
- Phylum: Arthropoda
- Class: Insecta
- Order: Lepidoptera
- Superfamily: Noctuoidea
- Family: Erebidae
- Subfamily: Herminiinae
- Genus: Zorzines; H. Druce in Godman & Salvin, 1891
- Species: Z. plumula

Binomial name
- Zorzines plumula H. Druce, 1891

Genus of moths

Zorzines is a monotypic moth genus of the family Noctuidae. Its only species, Zorzines plumula, is found in Panama. Both the genus and the species were first described by Herbert Druce in 1891.
