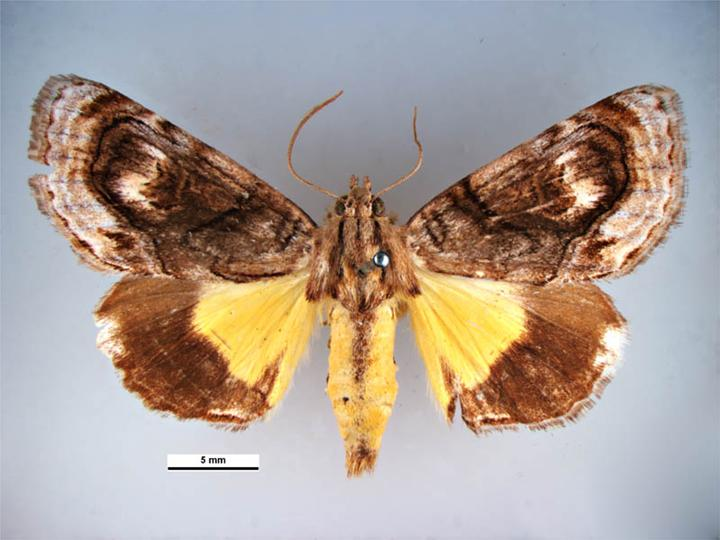
- Zalissa catocalina dorsal view

Scientific classification
- Kingdom: Animalia
- Phylum: Arthropoda
- Class: Insecta
- Order: Lepidoptera
- Superfamily: Noctuoidea
- Family: Noctuidae
- Subfamily: Agaristinae
- Genus: Zalissa; Walker, 1865

Synonyms
- Eulissa; Pagenstecher, 1909 (missp.); Jalissa; Pagenstecher, 1909 (missp.)

= Zalissa =

Genus of moths

Zalissa is a genus of moths of the family Noctuidae. The genus was erected by Francis Walker in 1865.

== Species ==
- Zalissa catocalina Walker, 1865 Western Australia
- Zalissa pratti (Bethune-Baker, 1906) New Guinea
- Zalissa stichograpta Turner, 1943 Queensland
