= Zorothis =

Scientific classification
- Domain: Eukaryota
- Kingdom: Animalia
- Phylum: Arthropoda
- Class: Insecta
- Order: Lepidoptera
- Superfamily: Noctuoidea
- Family: Erebidae
- Subfamily: Herminiinae
- Genus: Zorothis; Schaus, 1916

Genus of moths

Zorothis is a genus of moths of the family Noctuidae. The genus was erected by Schaus in 1916.

== Species ==
- Zorothis dissimilis Schaus, 1916
- Zorothis zacualpana Schaus, 1916
