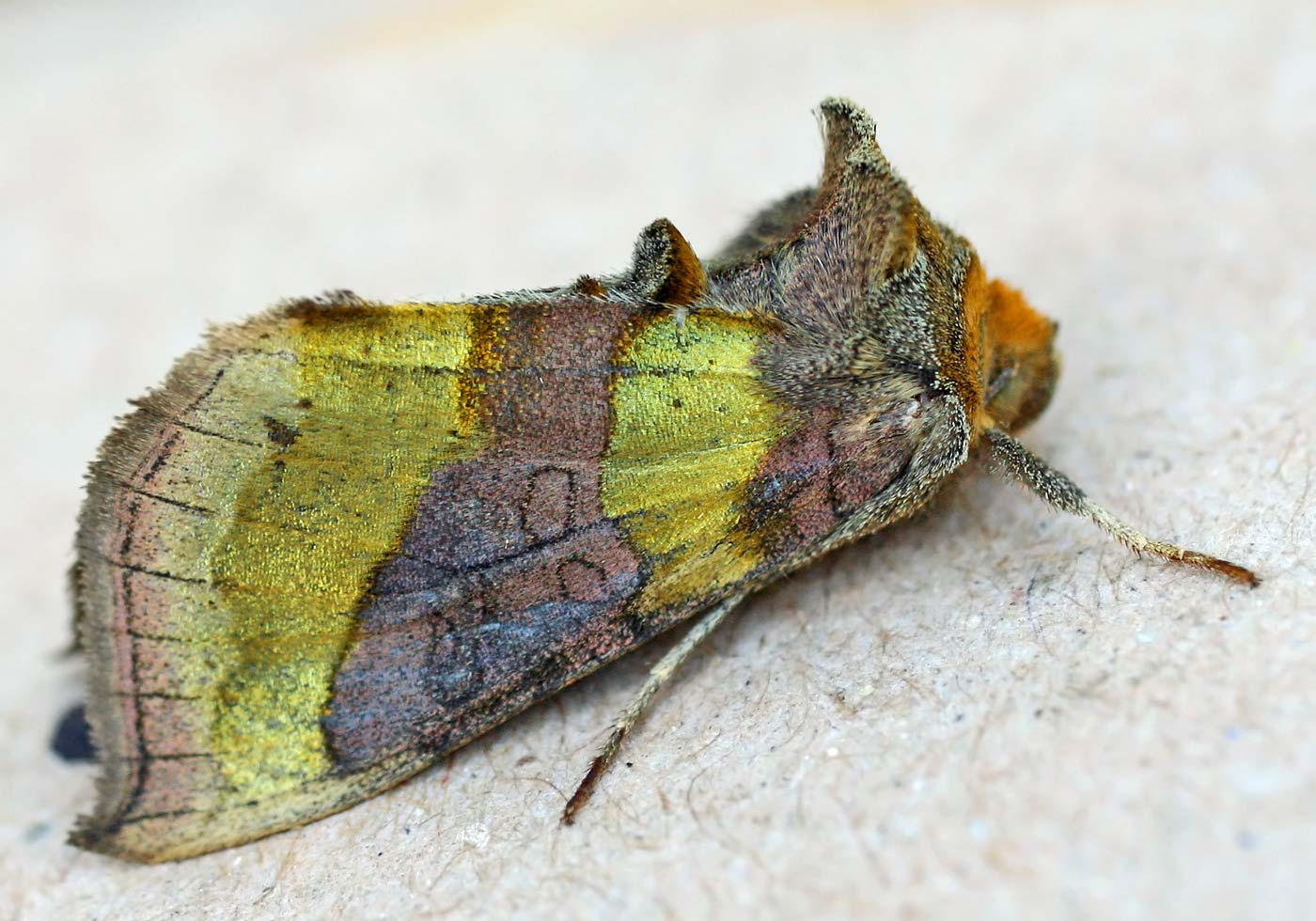
- Diachrysia chrysitis

Scientific classification
- Domain: Eukaryota
- Kingdom: Animalia
- Phylum: Arthropoda
- Class: Insecta
- Order: Lepidoptera
- Superfamily: Noctuoidea
- Family: Noctuidae
- Subtribe: Autoplusiina
- Genus: Diachrysia; Hübner, [1821]

= Diachrysia =

Genus of moths

Diachrysia is a genus of moths in the family Noctuidae.

== Species ==
- Diachrysia aereoides Grote, 1864
- Diachrysia balluca Geyer, 1832
- Diachrysia bieti Oberthür, 1884
- Diachrysia chrysitis – burnished brass Linnaeus, 1758
- Diachrysia chryson – scarce burnished brass Esper, 1789
- Diachrysia coreae Bryk, 1949
- Diachrysia generosa Staudinger, 1900
- Diachrysia leonina Oberthür, 1884
- Diachrysia nadeja Oberthür, 1880
- Diachrysia stenochrysis Warren, 1913
- Diachrysia zosimi Hübner, [1822]
