= Ziela =

Scientific classification
- Kingdom: Animalia
- Phylum: Arthropoda
- Class: Insecta
- Order: Lepidoptera
- Superfamily: Noctuoidea
- Family: Erebidae
- Subfamily: Herminiinae
- Genus: Ziela; D. S. Fletcher & Viette, 1955

Genus of moths

Ziela is a monotypic moth genus of the family Noctuidae described by David Stephen Fletcher and Pierre Viette in 1955. Its single species, Ziela biplaga, described in the same article, was found in Guinea.
