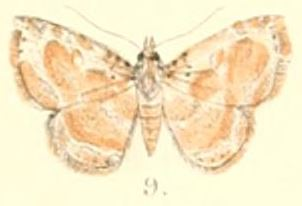
- Zurobata reticulata

Scientific classification
- Kingdom: Animalia
- Phylum: Arthropoda
- Class: Insecta
- Order: Lepidoptera
- Superfamily: Noctuoidea
- Family: Erebidae
- Subfamily: Boletobiinae
- Genus: Zurobata; Walker, 1866

= Zurobata =

Genus of moths

Zurobata is a genus of moths of the family Erebidae. The genus was erected by Francis Walker in 1866.

== Taxonomy ==
The genus has previously been classified in the subfamily Acontiinae of the family Noctuidae.

== Species ==
- Zurobata decorata (C. Swinhoe, 1903)
- Zurobata fissifascia Hampson, 1896
- Zurobata intractata (Walker, 1864)
- Zurobata reticulata (Moore, 1882)
- Zurobata rorata Walker, 1865 (syn: Zurobata constellata (Snellen, 1880), Zurobata multiguttata (Moore, 1885))
- Zurobata vacillans (Walker, 1864) (syn: Zurobata aequalis (Walker, 1864), Zurobata inaequalis (Walker, 1864), Zurobata irrecta (Walker, 1865), Zurobata niviapex (Walker, 1865), Zurobata selenicula (Snellen, 1880))
