= Zanclopalpus =

Scientific classification
- Kingdom: Animalia
- Phylum: Arthropoda
- Class: Insecta
- Order: Lepidoptera
- Superfamily: Noctuoidea
- Family: Erebidae
- Subfamily: Hypeninae
- Genus: Zanclopalpus; Hampson, 1893

Genus of moths

Zanclopalpus is a genus of moths of the family Noctuidae.

== Species ==
- Zanclopalpus rasalis (Warren, 1891)
