= Zeuxinia =

Scientific classification
- Domain: Eukaryota
- Kingdom: Animalia
- Phylum: Arthropoda
- Class: Insecta
- Order: Lepidoptera
- Superfamily: Noctuoidea
- Family: Erebidae
- Subfamily: Hypeninae
- Genus: Zeuxinia; Legrand, 1966
- Species: Z. aeschrina

Binomial name
- Zeuxinia aeschrina Legrand, 1966

Genus of moths

Zeuxinia is a monotypic moth genus of the family Erebidae. Its only species, Zeuxinia aeschrina, is found on Aldabra, a coral atoll in the Seychelles. Both the genus and the species were first described by Henry Legrand in 1966.
