= Zellerminia =

Scientific classification
- Domain: Eukaryota
- Kingdom: Animalia
- Phylum: Arthropoda
- Class: Insecta
- Order: Lepidoptera
- Superfamily: Noctuoidea
- Family: Erebidae
- Subfamily: Herminiinae
- Genus: Zellerminia; Beck, 1996

Genus of moths

Zellerminia is a genus of moths of the family Noctuidae.

== Species ==
- Zellerminia zelleralis (Wocke, 1850)
