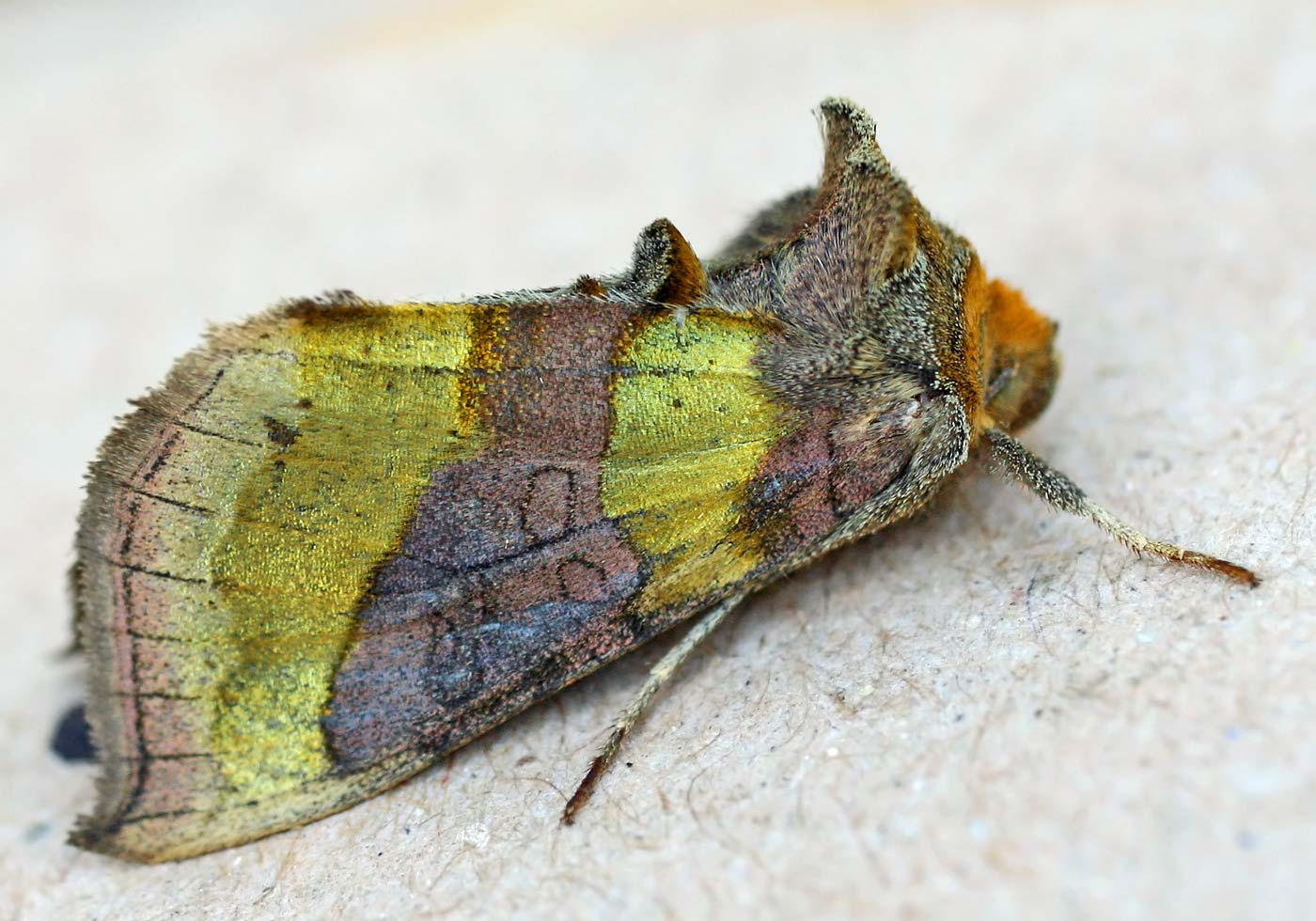

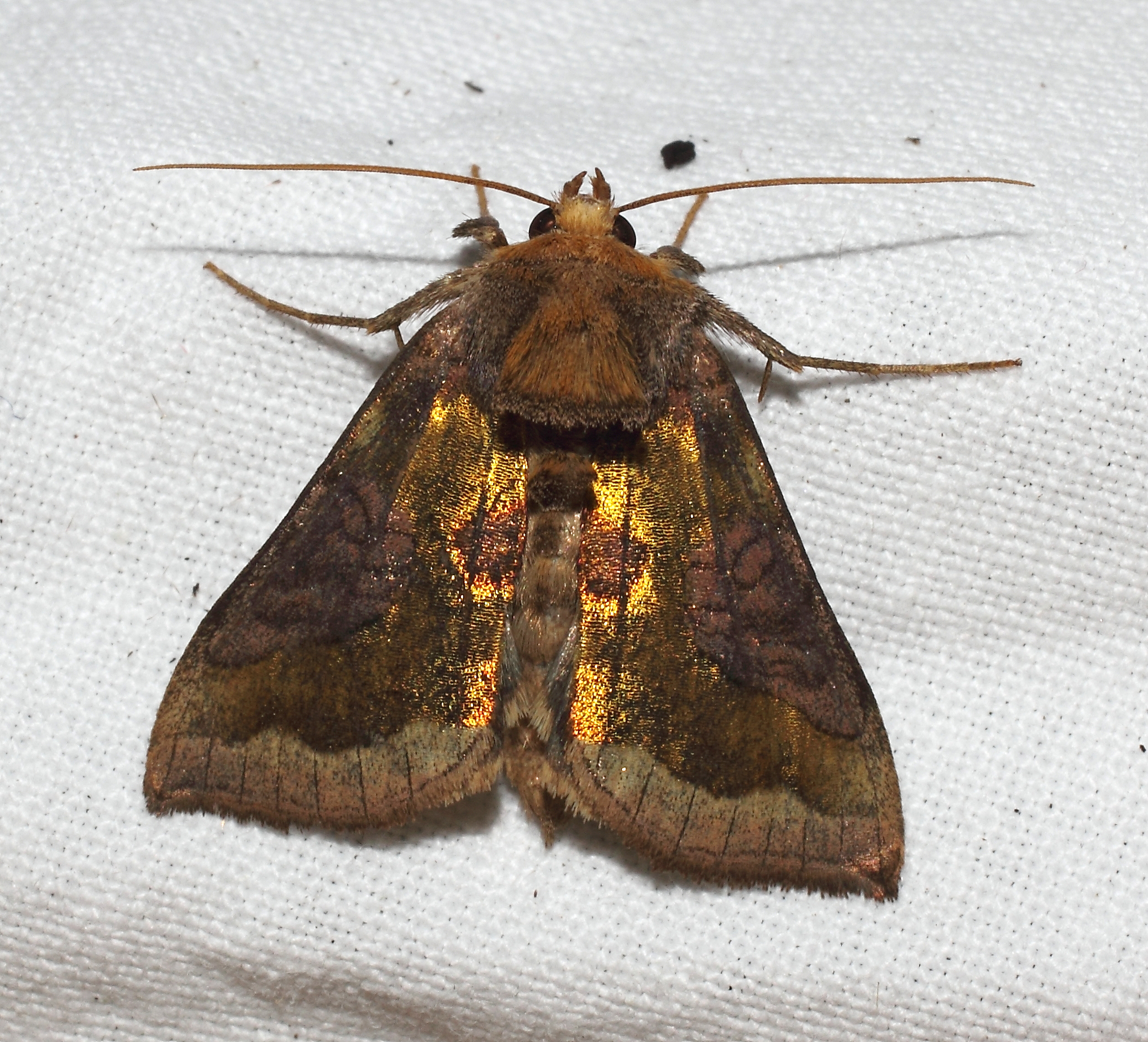

Scientific classification
- Kingdom: Animalia
- Phylum: Arthropoda
- Clade: Pancrustacea
- Class: Insecta
- Order: Lepidoptera
- Superfamily: Noctuoidea
- Family: Noctuidae
- Genus: Diachrysia
- Species: D. chrysitis

Binomial name
- Diachrysia chrysitis (Linnaeus, 1758)

= Diachrysia chrysitis =

Species of moth

Diachrysia chrysitis, the burnished brass, is a species of moth of the family Noctuidae. It is found in Europe, the Caucasus, Russia, Russian Far East and Siberia. In the south of Europe the range extends to southern Spain, southern Italy and the Balkan Peninsula. It is lacking on most of the Greek Islands. In the north it extends into almost to the Arctic Circle and far north Russia. In the east the range extends to the Amur region and Japan.

== Description ==
The wingspan is 28–35 mm. The length of the forewings is 16–18 mm. Forewing brassy green; the basal patch and broad median fascia, widening at costa, purplish brown; subterminal line preceded by a shade showing deeper green in certain lights; the terminal area paler brown; the three stigmata with dark outlines; hindwing fuscous with the fringe pale; in the ab. juncta Tutt the median fascia is more or less widely broken in the middle, the two brassy green areas becoming confluent; - in ab. aurea Huene the green is deep golden, with the golden bands confluent; ab. disjuncta Schultz, golden with the bands not confluent, while in ab. scintillans Schultz the bands are dull blue green.

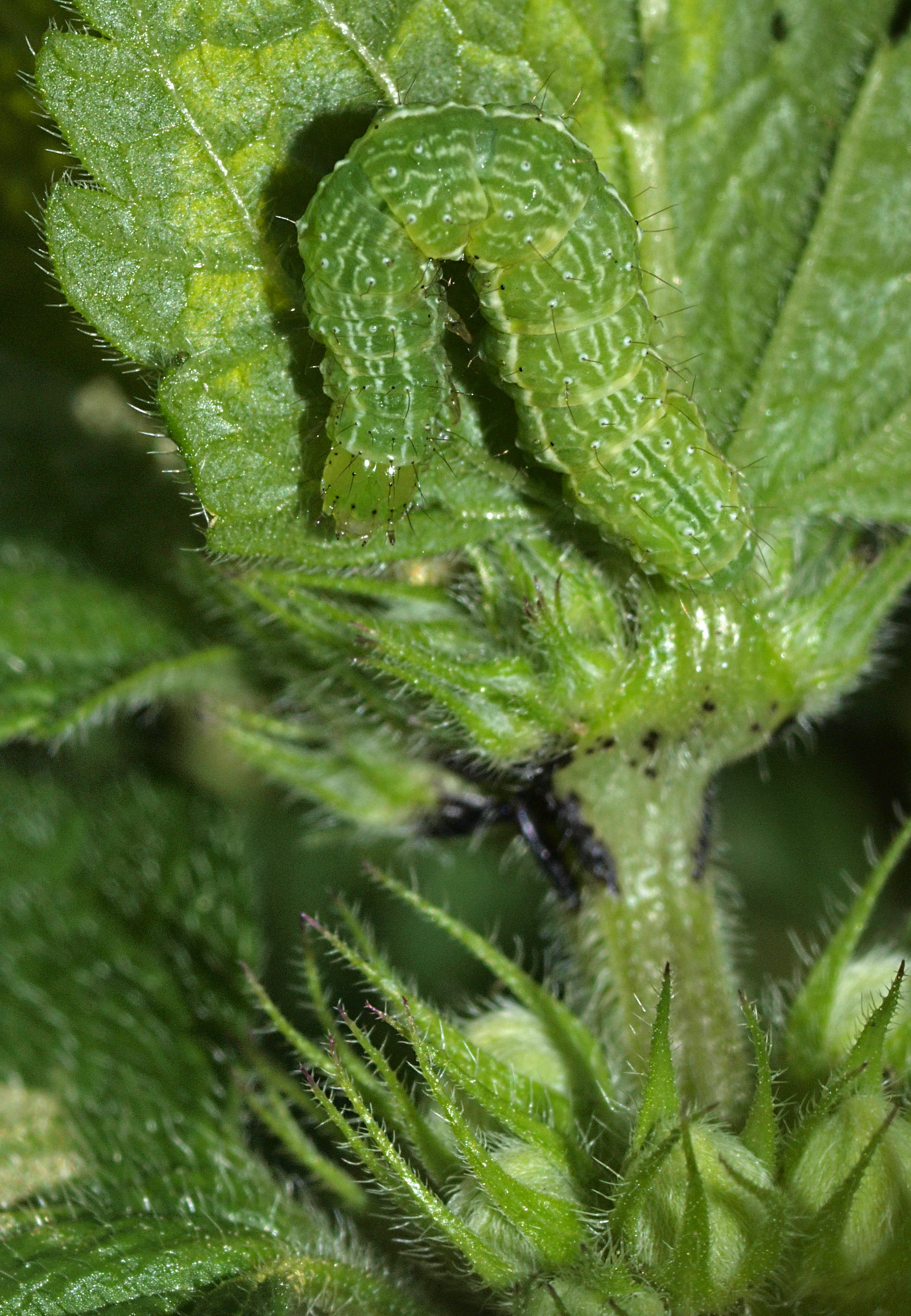
larva

The moth flies from May to October depending on the location.

Larva green, with many fine whitish dorsal lines; sinuous white lines along the sides and a white stripe above the feet. The larvae feed on various herbaceous plants, such as nettle, Lamium, thistles and oregano.
