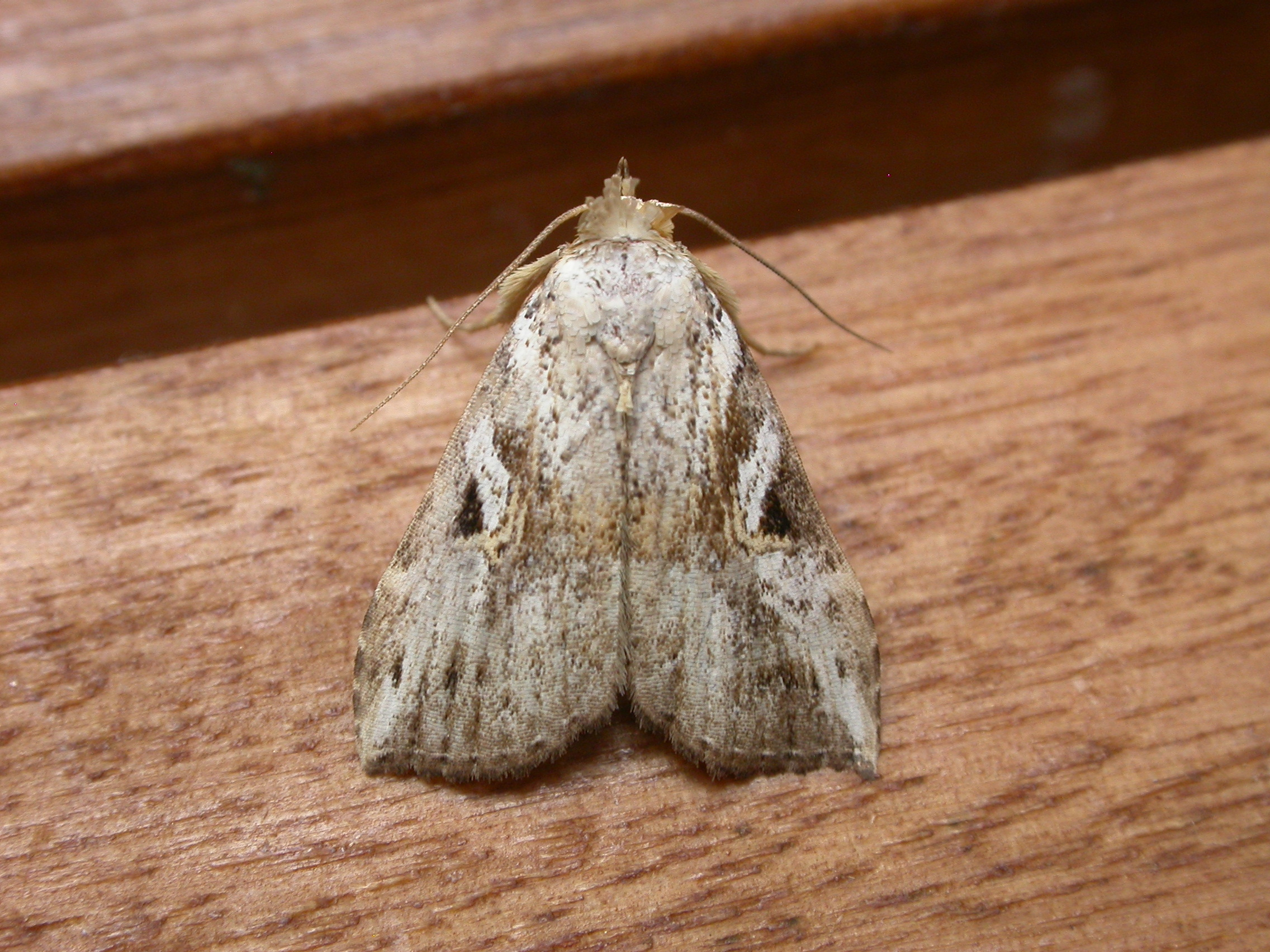

Scientific classification
- Kingdom: Animalia
- Phylum: Arthropoda
- Clade: Pancrustacea
- Class: Insecta
- Order: Lepidoptera
- Superfamily: Noctuoidea
- Family: Erebidae
- Genus: Pseudogyrtona
- Species: P. perversa

Binomial name
- Pseudogyrtona perversa (Walker, 1862)

Synonyms
- Xylina perverse Walker, 1862

= Pseudogyrtona perversa =

Species of moth

Pseudogyrtona perversa is a moth of the family Noctuidae first described by Francis Walker in 1862. It is found in Sri Lanka, Borneo and Australia.

Its wingspan is about 2.5 cm. Adult with brownish body, with a complex pattern on each forewing. A dark triangular patch found near the center of each costa. Hindwings are plain brownish.
