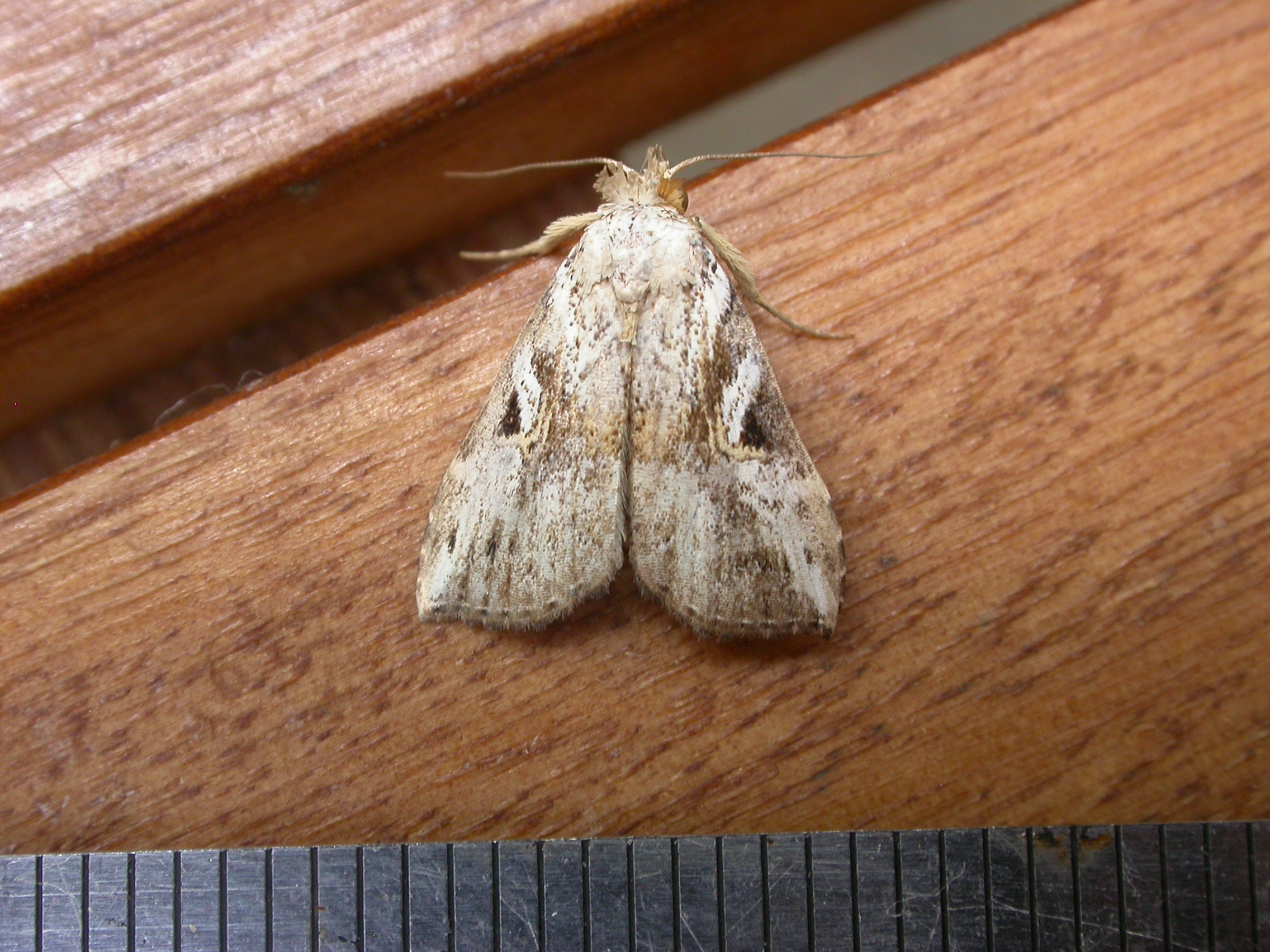
- Pseudogyrtona pervesa, one of the species in the Genus.

Scientific classification
- Domain: Eukaryota
- Kingdom: Animalia
- Phylum: Arthropoda
- Class: Insecta
- Order: Lepidoptera
- Superfamily: Noctuoidea
- Family: Erebidae
- Subfamily: Calpinae
- Genus: Pseudogyrtona; Bethune-Baker, 1908

= Pseudogyrtona =

Genus of moths

Pseudogyrtona is a genus of moths of the family Erebidae. The genus was first described by George Thomas Bethune-Baker in 1908.

- Pseudogyrtona bilineatoides Poole, 1989 New Guinea
- Pseudogyrtona fulvana Bethune-Baker, 1908 New Guinea, Queensland
- Pseudogyrtona hemicyclopis Hampson, 1926 Borneo
- Pseudogyrtona hypenina (Rothschild, 1915) New Guinea
- Pseudogyrtona marmorea (Wileman & South, 1916) Taiwan
- Pseudogyrtona mesoscia Hampson, 1926 Philippines (Luzon)
- Pseudogyrtona modesta (Moore, [1884]) Sri Lanka
- Pseudogyrtona nigrivitta Hampson, 1926 Malawi
- Pseudogyrtona ochreopuncta Wileman & South, 1916 Taiwan
- Pseudogyrtona octosema Hampson, 1926 Borneo
- Pseudogyrtona perversa (Walker, 1862) Borneo, Sri Lanka
- Pseudogyrtona trichocera Hampson, 1926 Philippines (Luzon)
