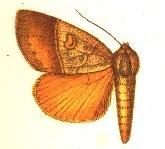
- Dermaleipa minians

Scientific classification
- Kingdom: Animalia
- Phylum: Arthropoda
- Class: Insecta
- Order: Lepidoptera
- Superfamily: Noctuoidea
- Family: Erebidae
- Tribe: Ophiusini
- Genus: Dermaleipa; Saalmüller, 1891

= Dermaleipa =

Genus of moths

Dermaleipa is a genus of moths in the family Erebidae. Some sources consider it a synonym of Thyas.

== Selected species ==
There are nine recognized species:

- Dermaleipa androgyna Berio, 1954
- Dermaleipa arcifera Hampson, 1913
- Dermaleipa metaphaea Hampson, 1913
- Dermaleipa meterythra Hampson, 1918
- Dermaleipa minians Mabille, 1884
- Dermaleipa nubilata Holland, 1920
- Dermaleipa parallelipipeda Guenée, 1852
- Dermaleipa quadrilineata Strand, 1912
- Dermaleipa rubricata Holland, 1894
