= Elousa =

Scientific classification
- Kingdom: Animalia
- Phylum: Arthropoda
- Class: Insecta
- Order: Lepidoptera
- Superfamily: Noctuoidea
- Family: Erebidae
- Tribe: Omopterini
- Genus: Elousa; Walker, 1858

Synonyms
- Masebia Walker, 1858

Genus of moths

Elousa is a genus of moths in the family Erebidae. The genus was erected by Francis Walker in 1858.

== Taxonomy ==
The genus was previously classified in the subtribe Ophiusina of the family Noctuidae or the tribe Ophiusini of the family Erebidae.

== Species ==
- Elousa albicans Walker, [1858]
- Elousa psegmapteryx Dyar, 1913
- Elousa schausi Giacomelli, 1911

== Former species ==
- Elousa fraterna Smith, 1899
- Elousa mima Harvey, 1876
- Elousa minor Smith, 1899
