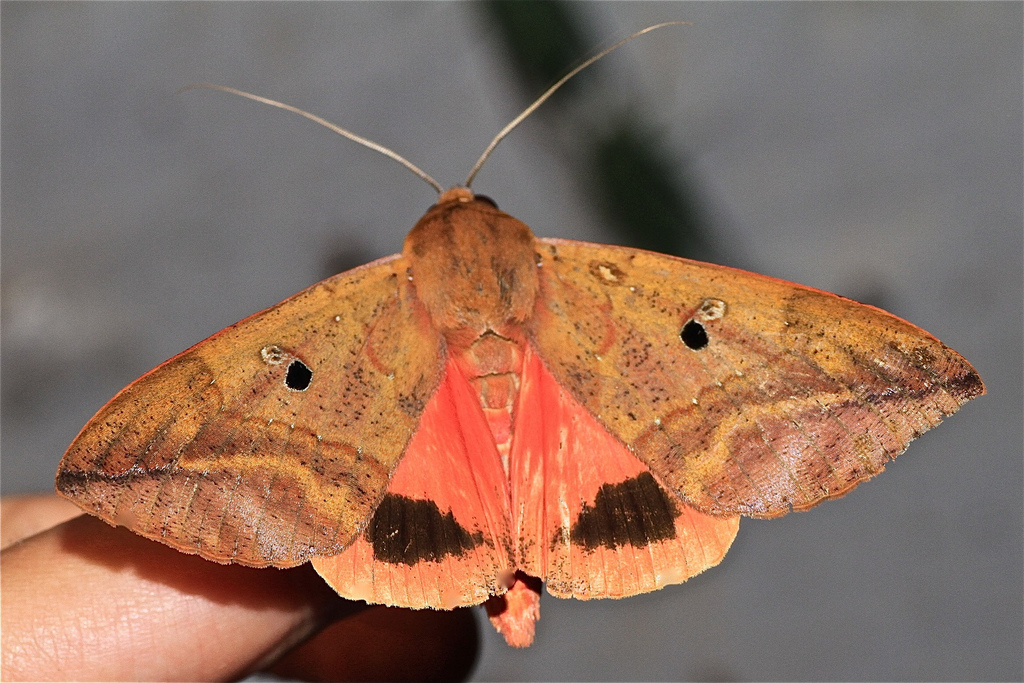
- In Borneo

Scientific classification
- Kingdom: Animalia
- Phylum: Arthropoda
- Clade: Pancrustacea
- Class: Insecta
- Order: Lepidoptera
- Superfamily: Noctuoidea
- Family: Erebidae
- Genus: Thyas
- Species: T. honesta

Binomial name
- Thyas honesta Hübner, 1824

Synonyms
- Ophiusa honesta Hübner, 1824

= Thyas honesta =

Species of moth

Thyas honesta is a species of moth of the superfamily Noctuoidea and the family Erebidae first described by Jacob Hübner in 1824. It is found in the Indian subregion, Myanmar, Thailand, Peninsular Malaysia, Sumatra, Sri Lanka, Borneo and on the Philippines.

== Taxonomy ==
Some sources also list the species for Java. Jeremy Daniel Holloway (in his work The Moths of Borneo) lists this species as ranging down to Sumatra, while the sister species Thyas miniacea is listed from the Lesser Sunda Islands east, leaving Java unassigned.

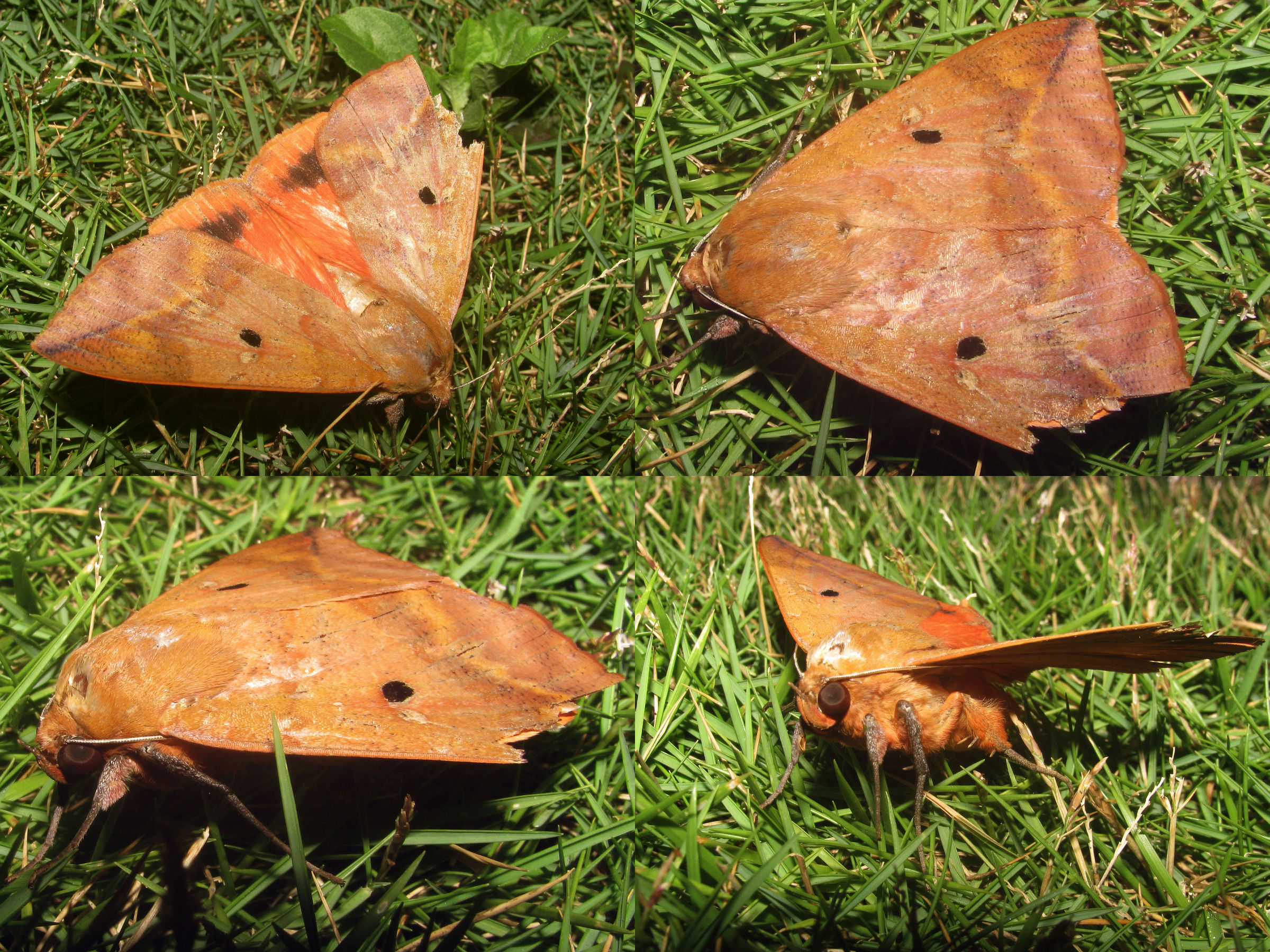

== Description ==
Its wingspan is about 84–104 mm. Head and thorax reddish chestnut in colour, where the third joint of palpi black. Abdomen crimson. Forewings reddish chestnut, slightly irrorated with dark scales. There are traces of a sinuous antemedial line with three specks on it. Reniform greyish, where the lower part more or less completely filled in with black. A curved postmedial series of white specks with an indistinct band beyond it angled at vein 6 and met by a dark streak from the apex. A marginal series of specks present. Hindwings crimson with black sub-marginal medial patch.

Larva ophiusine-shaped with an apple-greenish body and finely lined longitudinally with purple-centered double white lines. The dorsolateral pair of conical tubercles are yellowish patched with red. The larvae feed on Careya, Barringtonia and Planchonia species.
