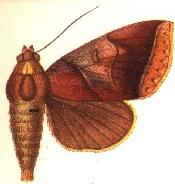

Scientific classification
- Kingdom: Animalia
- Phylum: Arthropoda
- Class: Insecta
- Order: Lepidoptera
- Superfamily: Noctuoidea
- Family: Erebidae
- Genus: Artena
- Species: A. submira

Binomial name
- Artena submira Walker, 1858

Synonyms
- Lagoptera submira (Walker, 1858)

= Artena submira =

Species of moth

Artena submira is a species of moth of the family Erebidae first described by Francis Walker in 1858. It is found in India.
