= Artena velutina =

Scientific classification
- Kingdom: Animalia
- Phylum: Arthropoda
- Clade: Pancrustacea
- Class: Insecta
- Order: Lepidoptera
- Superfamily: Noctuoidea
- Family: Erebidae
- Genus: Artena
- Species: A. velutina

Binomial name
- Artena velutina (L. B. Prout, 1919)

Synonyms
- Lagoptera rubida velutina L. B. Prout, 1919; Artena rubida velutina (L. B. Prout, 1919)

Species of moth

Artena velutina is a species of moth of the family Erebidae first described by Louis Beethoven Prout in 1919. It is found from New Guinea to the Solomons and possibly on Seram.
