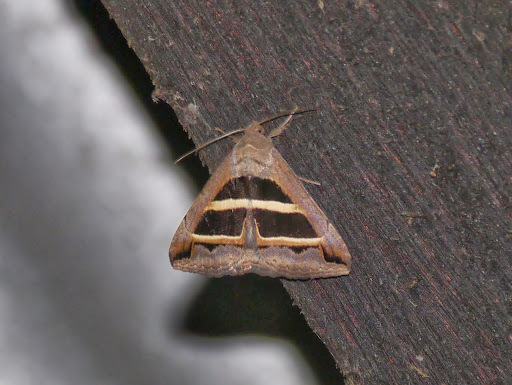

Scientific classification
- Kingdom: Animalia
- Phylum: Arthropoda
- Clade: Pancrustacea
- Class: Insecta
- Order: Lepidoptera
- Superfamily: Noctuoidea
- Family: Erebidae
- Genus: Grammodes
- Species: G. bifasciata

Binomial name
- Grammodes bifasciata (Petagna, 1787)

Synonyms
- Noctua bifasciata; Phalaena linearis; Phalaena chalciptera; Noctua parallelaris

= Grammodes bifasciata =

Species of moth

Grammodes bifasciata is a moth of the family Erebidae first described by Vincenzo Petagna in 1787. It is found in Madagascar, eastern Africa, North Africa and other parts of the Mediterranean Basin, including south of France and Israel.

There are multiple generations per year in Africa. Adults are on wing from May to August.

The larvae feed on Rubus, Cistus (especially Cistus salviifolius), Smilax and Polygonum species.
