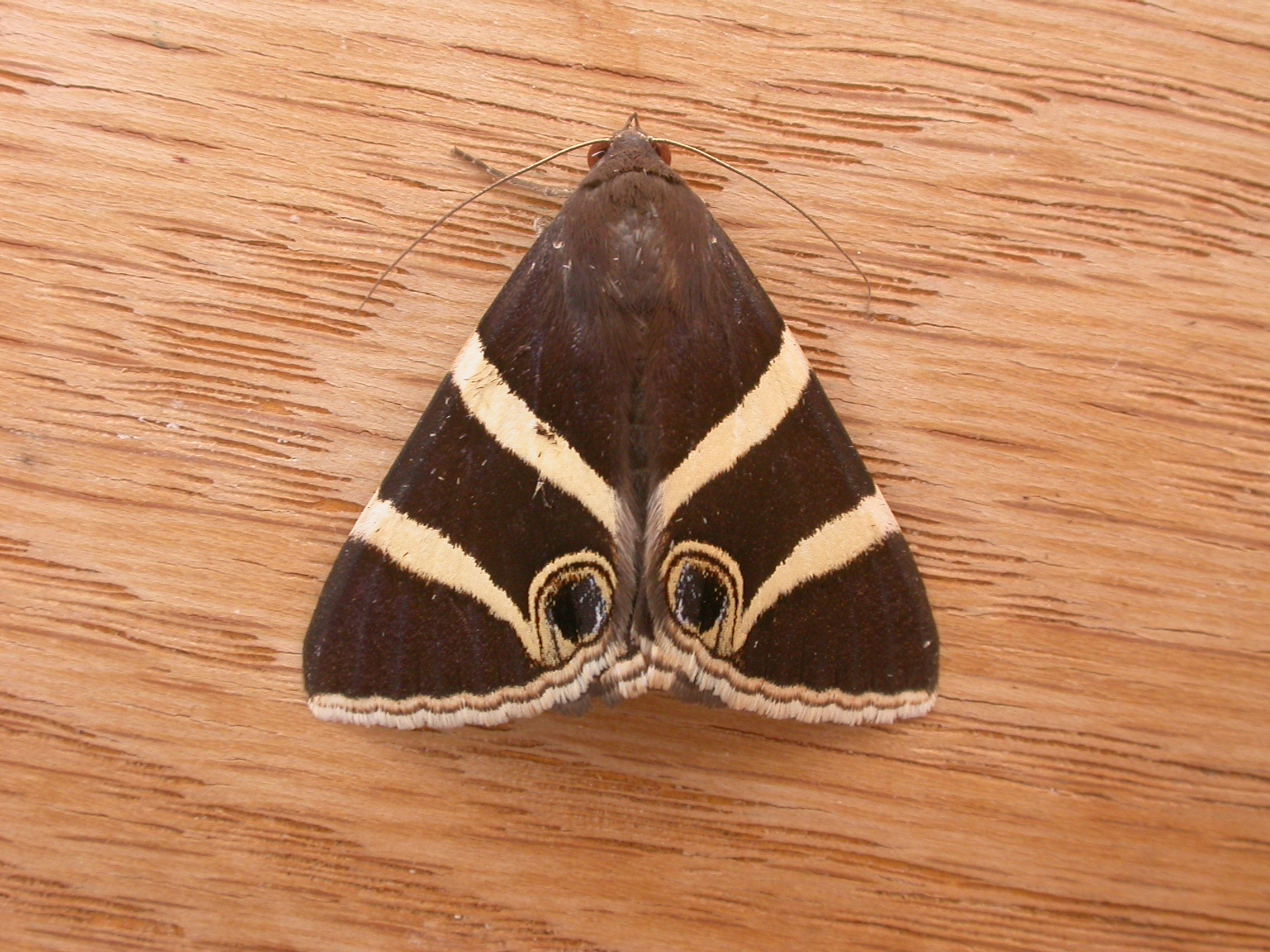

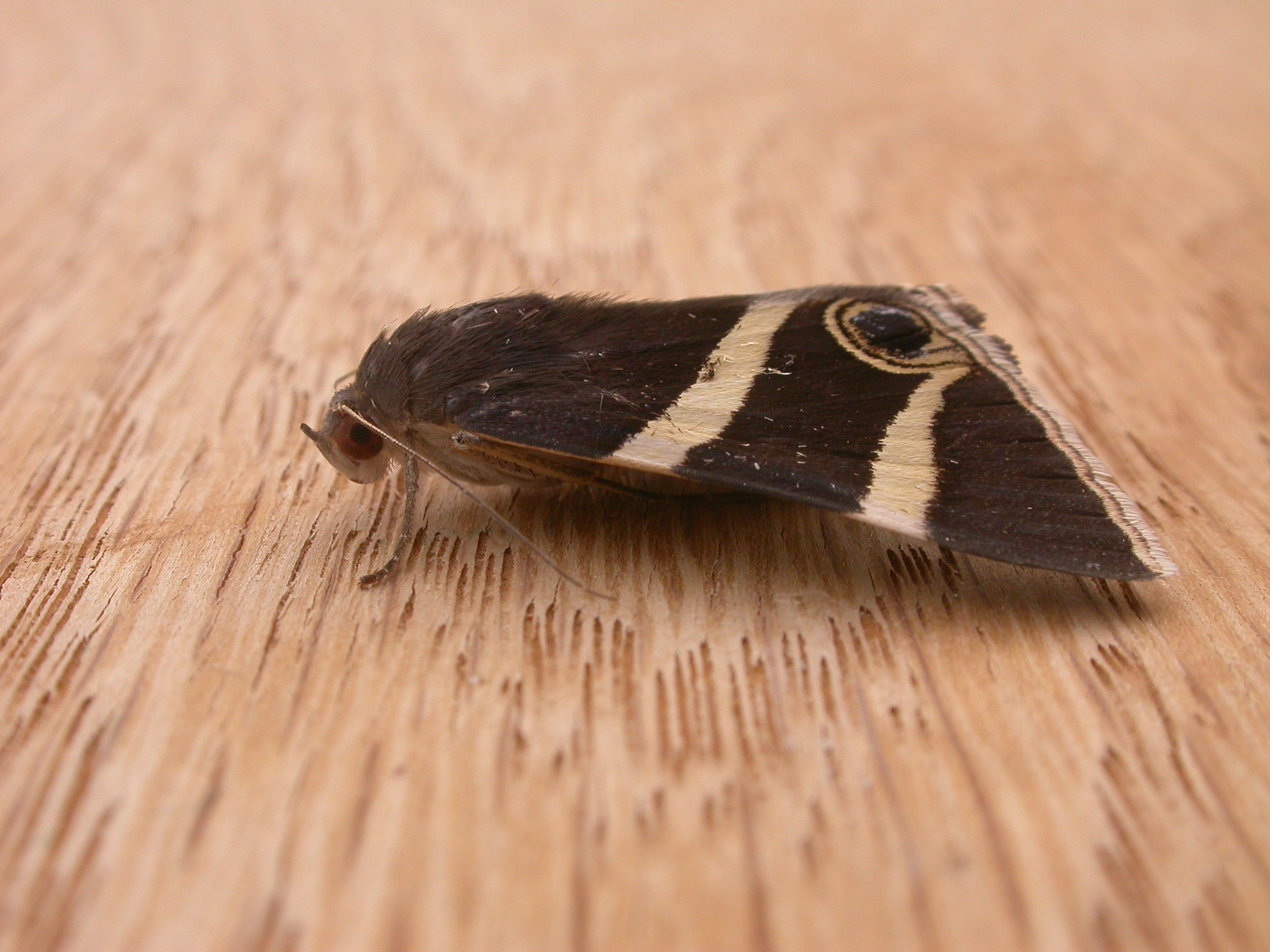

Scientific classification
- Kingdom: Animalia
- Phylum: Arthropoda
- Class: Insecta
- Order: Lepidoptera
- Superfamily: Noctuoidea
- Family: Erebidae
- Genus: Grammodes
- Species: G. ocellata

Binomial name
- Grammodes ocellata Tepper, 1890

Synonyms
- Grammodes excellens Lucas, 1893; Prodotis excellens (Lucas, 1893)

= Grammodes ocellata =

Species of moth

Grammodes ocellata, the large-eyed box-owlet, is a moth of the family Noctuidae first described by J. G. O. Tepper in 1890. It is found in the northern half of Australia.

The wingspan is about 40 mm.

The larvae feed on Phyllanthus maderaspatanus.
