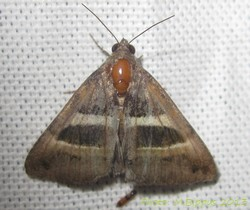

Scientific classification
- Kingdom: Animalia
- Phylum: Arthropoda
- Clade: Pancrustacea
- Class: Insecta
- Order: Lepidoptera
- Superfamily: Noctuoidea
- Family: Erebidae
- Genus: Grammodes
- Species: G. congenita

Binomial name
- Grammodes congenita Walker, 1858

Synonyms
- Grammodes exclusiva Pagenstecher, 1907

= Grammodes congenita =

Species of moth

Grammodes congenita is a moth of the family Noctuidae. It is found in Africa, including South Africa, Eswatini and Madagascar.

Foodplants of the larvae of this species are Cistus salvifolius, Rubus sp., Smilax sp. and Polygonum sp.. This species also figures on a $100 stamp of Cabo Verde from 1999.
