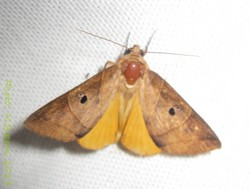

Scientific classification
- Kingdom: Animalia
- Phylum: Arthropoda
- Class: Insecta
- Order: Lepidoptera
- Superfamily: Noctuoidea
- Family: Erebidae
- Genus: Thyas
- Species: T. parallelipipeda

Binomial name
- Thyas parallelipipeda (Guenée,1852)

Synonyms
- Ophiodes parallelipipeda Guenée, 1852; Thyas saalmuelleri (Mabille, 1879)

= Thyas parallelipipeda =

Species of moth

Thyas parallelipipeda is a species of moth of the family Noctuidae. It is found in western, central and eastern Africa, where it is known from Congo, Equatorial Guinea, Nigeria , Senegal, Zambia, Ghana Madagascar and South Africa.
