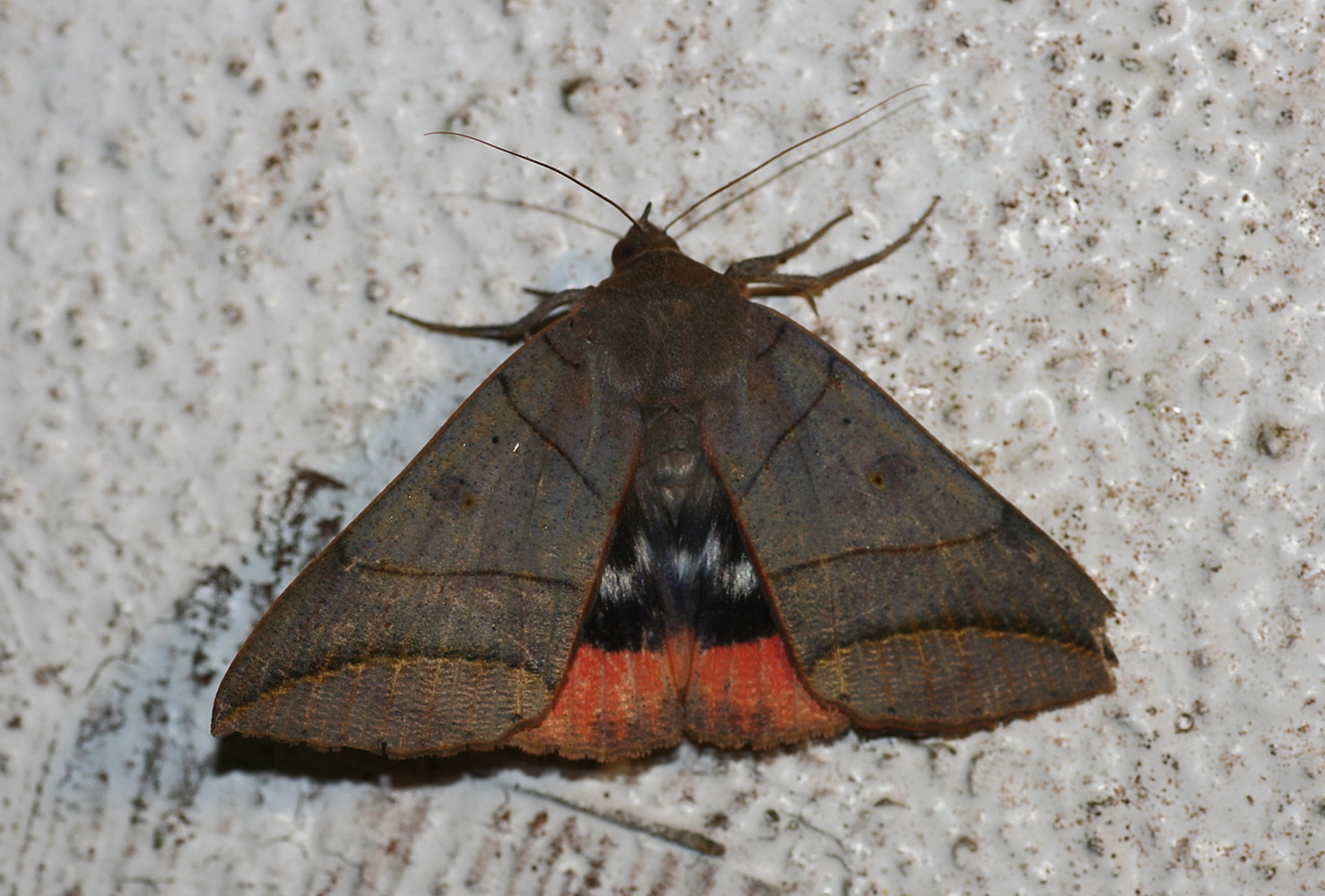

Scientific classification
- Kingdom: Animalia
- Phylum: Arthropoda
- Class: Insecta
- Order: Lepidoptera
- Superfamily: Noctuoidea
- Family: Erebidae
- Genus: Thyas
- Species: T. juno

Binomial name
- Thyas juno (Dalman, 1823)

Synonyms
- Noctua juno Dalman, 1823; Ophideres elegans Hoeven, 1840; Lagoptera multicolor , 1852; Thyas bella Bremer & Grey, 1853; Dermaleipa juno ceramensis Prout, 1922; Dermaleipa juno f. renalis Bryk, 1948

= Thyas juno =

Species of moth

Thyas juno is a species of moth of the family Erebidae first described by Johan Wilhelm Dalman in 1823. It is found in the Indian subregion, China, Japan, Korea, Thailand, Borneo, Java, Sulawesi and on the southern Moluccas.

The larvae feed on Castanea, Quercus, Juglans and Pterocarya species.
