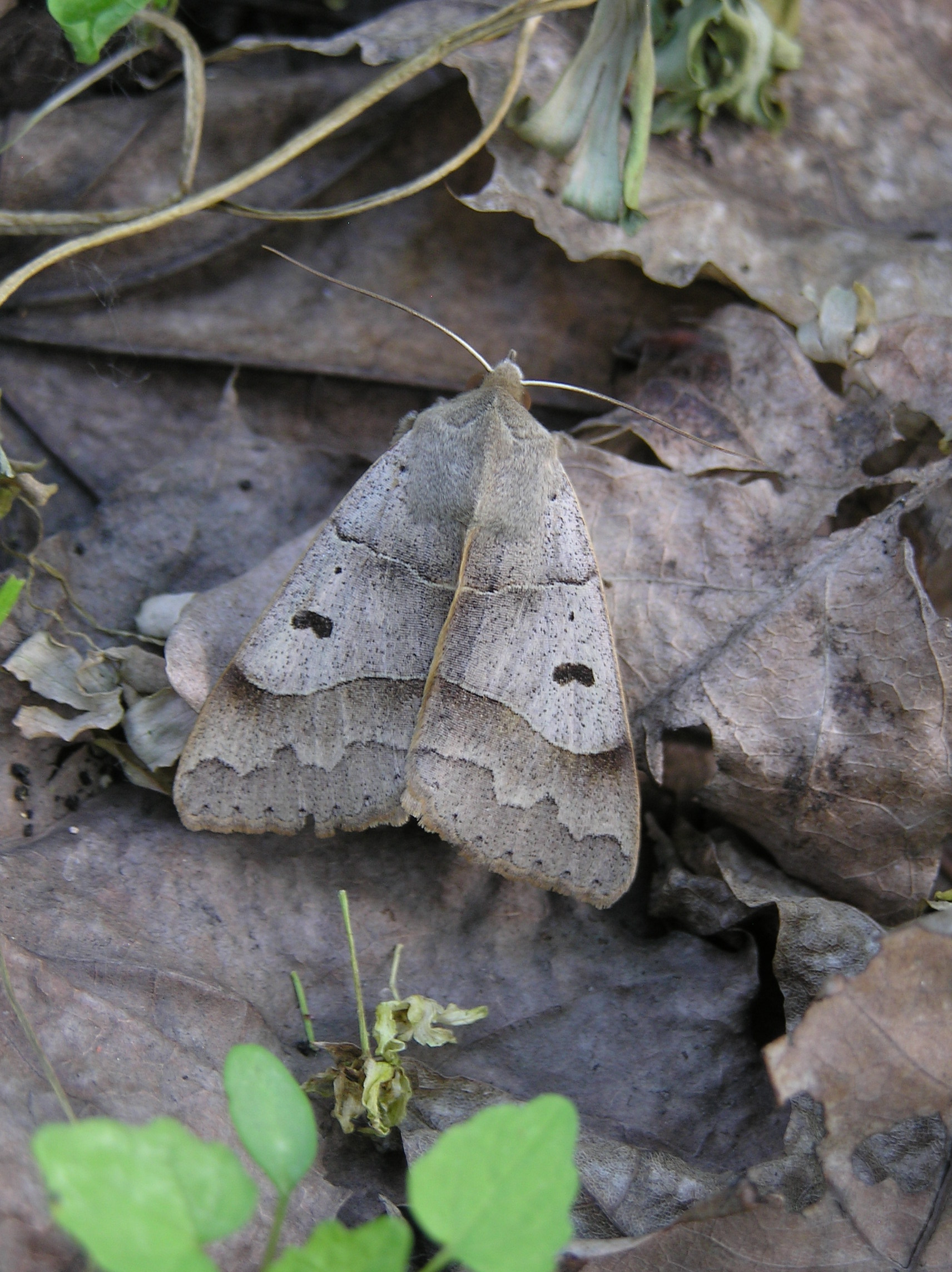

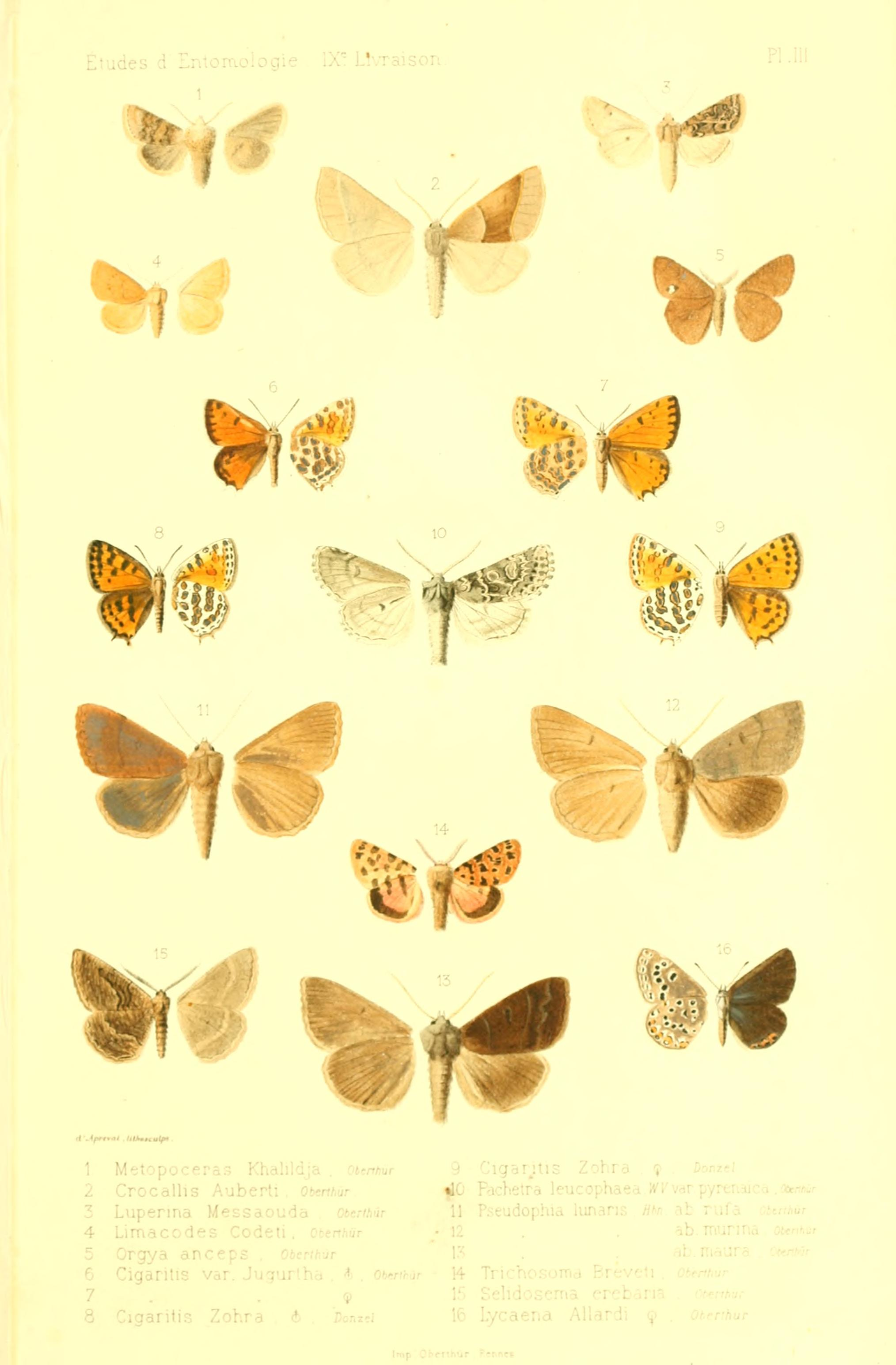
- Oberthur's forms in Etudes Entolologiques

Scientific classification
- Kingdom: Animalia
- Phylum: Arthropoda
- Clade: Pancrustacea
- Class: Insecta
- Order: Lepidoptera
- Superfamily: Noctuoidea
- Family: Erebidae
- Genus: Minucia
- Species: M. lunaris

Binomial name
- Minucia lunaris (Denis & Schiffermüller, 1775)

= Minucia lunaris =

Species of moth

Minucia lunaris, the lunar double-stripe or brown underwing, is a species of moth in the family Erebidae. The species was first described by Michael Denis and Ignaz Schiffermüller in 1775 and is found in Asia, Europe and North Africa.

== Technical description and variation ==
Minucia lunaris Schiff (= augur Esp.) Forewing pale ash grey, faintly dusted with dark, with a slight ochreous tinge, always darker in the female, tinged with pale red brown; inner and outer lines yellowish, the inner nearly straight, slightly bent inwards on subcostal vein and vein 1; the outer sinuous, approaching inner line on inner margin; orbicular a brown dot; reniform a brownish lunule; both lines followed by a brownish shade, the inner below middle only, the outer throughout; subterminal line twice indented, with a large rounded projection above each indentation; terminal area darker; a row of black terminal dots; hindwing pale brownish, with a faint curved pale median line before a fuscous brown submarginal border; this species varies in coloration; the ab. rufa Oberth. is red brown with thee markings more or less obsolete; ab murina Oberth. is mouse colour throughout, and maura Oberth. is blackish fuscous; — in ab. olivescens ab. nov., from Cintra, Portugal, the whole wing is tinged with greenish, and the abdomen is glossy; subsp. inconspicua nov. from Lambessa, N.Africa, is a smaller form, generally with slight and inconspicuous markings, dull grey in the male and somewhat pink-tinged in the female. Larva brown; dorsal line line, moniliform; subdorsal broad, dark, enclosing pale spots, with three line dark lines beneath it; spiracular pale, sometimes yellowish; two lateral projections on segment 5; pairs of dorsal points on last two segments; head brown. The wingspan is 53–61 mm.

== Biology ==
The adults fly from May to June depending on the location. The larvae feed nocturnally on the tender shoots of oak (Quercus species) in July and August. It overwinters as a pupa in a tough cocoon of coarsely spun silk, dead leaves and soil.

== Distribution ==
The lunar double-stripe is found in Central and Southern Europe, North Africa, Asia Minor and Kazakhstan. In Great Britain it is a scarce migrant. Frequent records from Sussex in the 1870s suggest it was once resident there and from 1947 moths, ova and larvae were regularly found in Orlestone Wood, Kent amongst oak coppice. Numbers declined from 1953 and the last record was in 1958; temporary residence is attributed to wartime coppicing and the consequent abundance of oak stools and fresh foliage.
