= Gnamptonyx =

Scientific classification
- Kingdom: Animalia
- Phylum: Arthropoda
- Class: Insecta
- Order: Lepidoptera
- Superfamily: Noctuoidea
- Family: Erebidae
- Tribe: Ophiusini
- Genus: Gnamptonyx; Hampson, 1894

Genus of moths

Gnamptonyx is a genus of moths in the family Erebidae.

== Species ==
- Gnamptonyx australis Viette, 1965
- Gnamptonyx innexa (Walker, 1858)
- Gnamptonyx obsoleta Hampson, 1913
