= Grammodes arenosa =

Scientific classification
- Kingdom: Animalia
- Phylum: Arthropoda
- Class: Insecta
- Order: Lepidoptera
- Superfamily: Noctuoidea
- Family: Erebidae
- Genus: Grammodes
- Species: G. arenosa

Binomial name
- Grammodes arenosa C. Swinhoe, 1902

Species of moth

Grammodes arenosa is a moth of the family Noctuidae first described by Charles Swinhoe in 1902. It is found in Australia.
