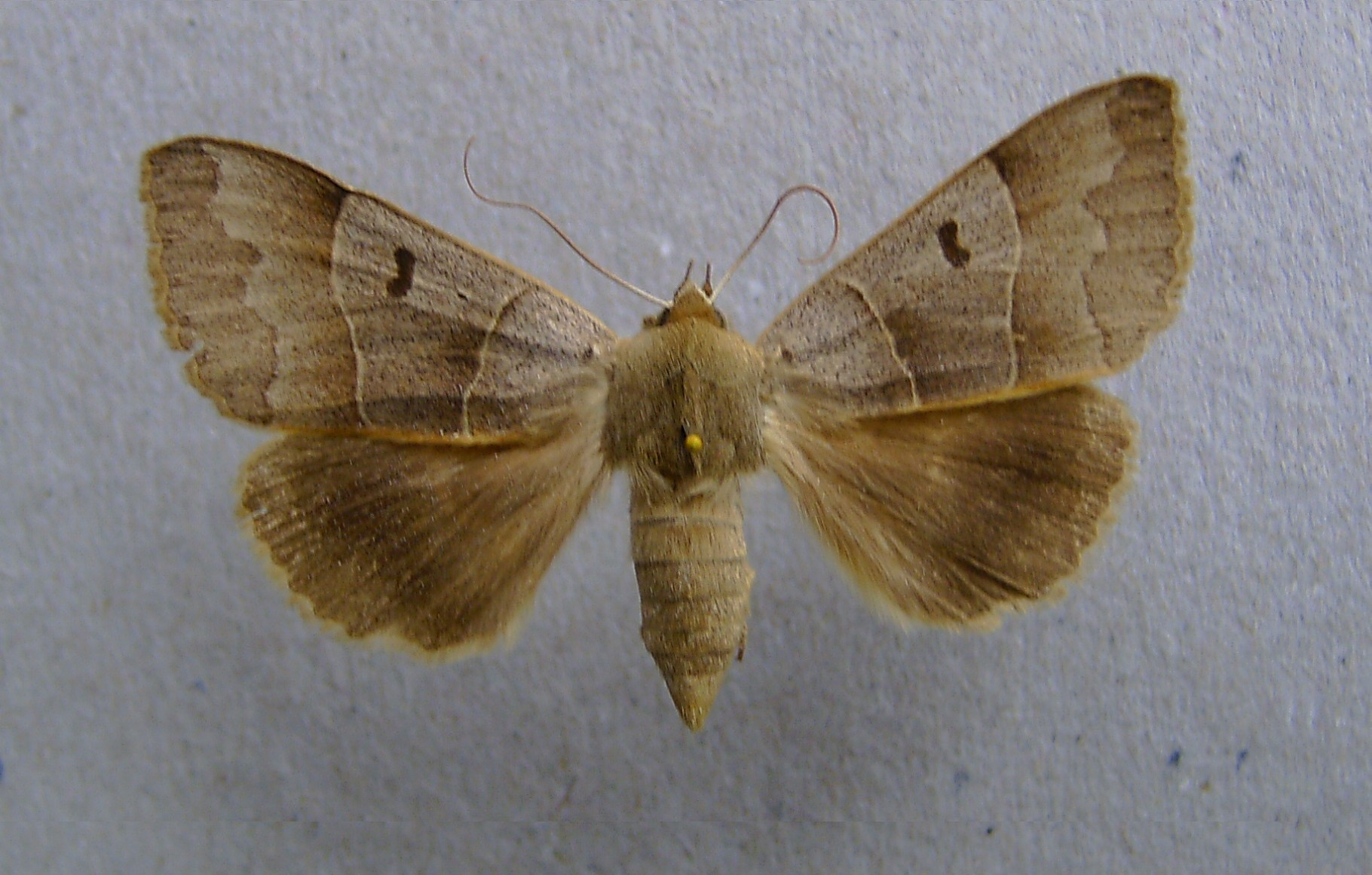
- Minucia lunaris

Scientific classification
- Kingdom: Animalia
- Phylum: Arthropoda
- Class: Insecta
- Order: Lepidoptera
- Superfamily: Noctuoidea
- Family: Erebidae
- Tribe: Ophiusini
- Genus: Minucia; Moore, [1885]

= Minucia =

Genus of moths

Minucia is a genus of moths in the family Erebidae. The genus was erected by Moore in 1885.

== Species ==
- Minucia bimaculata Osthelder, 1933
- Minucia heliothis Reberl, 1917
- Minucia lunaris (Denis & Schiffermüller, 1775) – lunar double-stripe, brown underwing
- Minucia profana Eversmann, 1857
- Minucia wiskotti Püngeler, 1901
