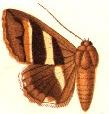

Scientific classification
- Kingdom: Animalia
- Phylum: Arthropoda
- Class: Insecta
- Order: Lepidoptera
- Superfamily: Noctuoidea
- Family: Erebidae
- Genus: Grammodes
- Species: G. cooma

Binomial name
- Grammodes cooma C. Swinhoe, 1900

Synonyms
- Grammodes frena C. Swinhoe, 1916

= Grammodes cooma =

Species of moth

Grammodes cooma is a moth of the family Noctuidae first described by Charles Swinhoe in 1900. It is known from the Australian state of Queensland and the Indonesia's Ambon Island.

The wingspan is about 40 mm.
