= Artena eccentrica =

Scientific classification
- Domain: Eukaryota
- Kingdom: Animalia
- Phylum: Arthropoda
- Class: Insecta
- Order: Lepidoptera
- Superfamily: Noctuoidea
- Family: Erebidae
- Genus: Artena
- Species: A. eccentrica

Binomial name
- Artena eccentrica Yoshimoto, 1999

Species of moth

Artena eccentrica is a species of moth of the family Erebidae first described by Yoshimoto in 1999. It is found on Mindanao in the Philippines.
