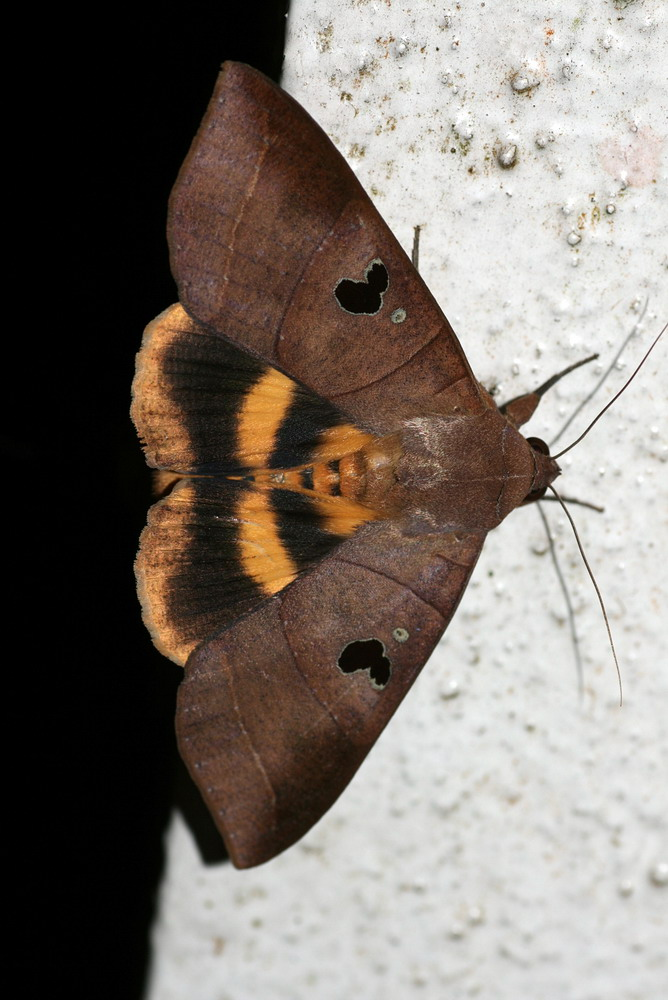

Scientific classification
- Kingdom: Animalia
- Phylum: Arthropoda
- Class: Insecta
- Order: Lepidoptera
- Superfamily: Noctuoidea
- Family: Erebidae
- Genus: Thyas
- Species: T. coronata

Binomial name
- Thyas coronata (Fabricius, 1775)

Synonyms
- Noctua coronata Fabricius, 1775; Noctua leonina Fabricius, 1775; Noctua ancilla Fabricius, 1794; Corycia magica Hübner, 1827; Ophiodes ponderosa Mabille, 1879; Anua coronata Fabricius; Holloway, 1976; Ophiusa coronata Fabricius; Kobes, 1985; Ophiusa ponderosa (Mabille, 1879); Ophiusa magica (Hübner, 1827); Ophiusa ancilla (Fabricius, 1794); Ophiusa leonina (Fabricius, 1775)

= Thyas coronata =

Species of moth

Thyas coronata is a species of moth of the family Erebidae first described by Johan Christian Fabricius in 1775. It is found from the Indo-Australian tropics of southern China, Taiwan, Japan, Nepal, India, Sri Lanka to Micronesia and the Society Islands.

== Description ==
The wingspan is about 82–96 mm. The head and thorax are a pale reddish brown. Abdomen orange, with black segments. Forewings irrorated (sprinkled) with dark specks. A short sub-basal dark line is present. There is an outwardly oblique slightly sinuous antemedial line and small round greyish orbicular can be seen. Renifrom large and chocolate coloured, ringed with grey or broken up into grey or chocolate grey-ringed spots. A slightly inwardly-oblique postmedial line and a pale sub-marginal line, which is slightly bent below the costa. Hindwings orange with broad medial and sub-marginal fuscous black bands not reaching inner margin. Sub-marginal lines widest towards costa. Ventral side orange. Costal and outer areas of both wings dark speckled and with a slight reddish suffusion. A black patch can be seen near the outer angle of the forewing.

Larva dull sienna brown and longitudinally striped with blackish brown. A dorsal black spot found on eighth somite and paired black dorsal tubercles can be seen on tenth and eleventh somites. A lateral yellow-edged spot is found on the fifth somite. Ventral side dark and head black striped.

The larvae feed on Combretum, Quisqualis (including Quisqualis indica), Terminalia (including Terminalia catappa), Litsea, Anamirta, Pinus and Nephelium species. It is considered a pest on oranges, lemons and other Citrus species.

== Gallery ==
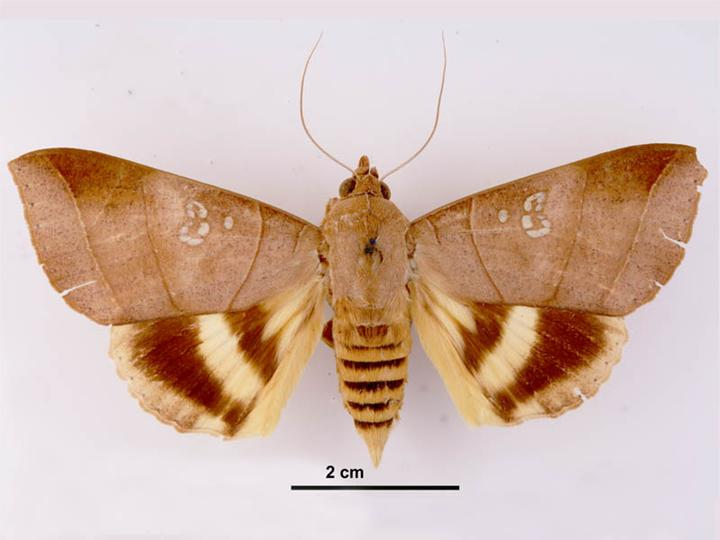
Female, dorsal view

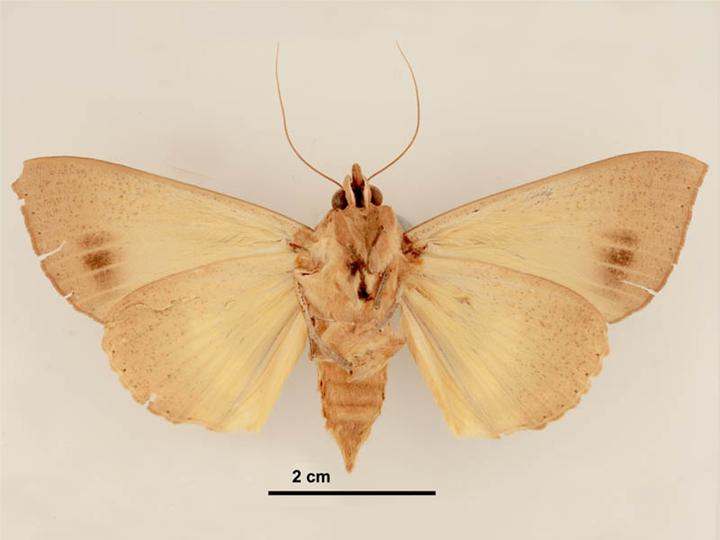
Female, ventral view

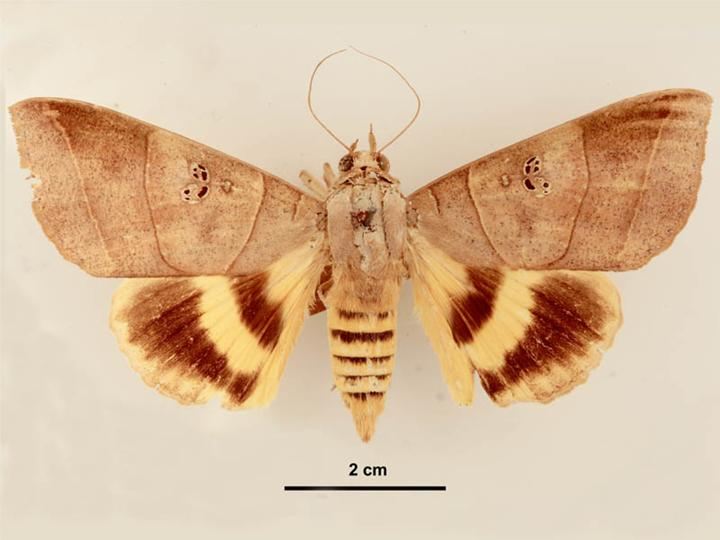
Male, dorsal view

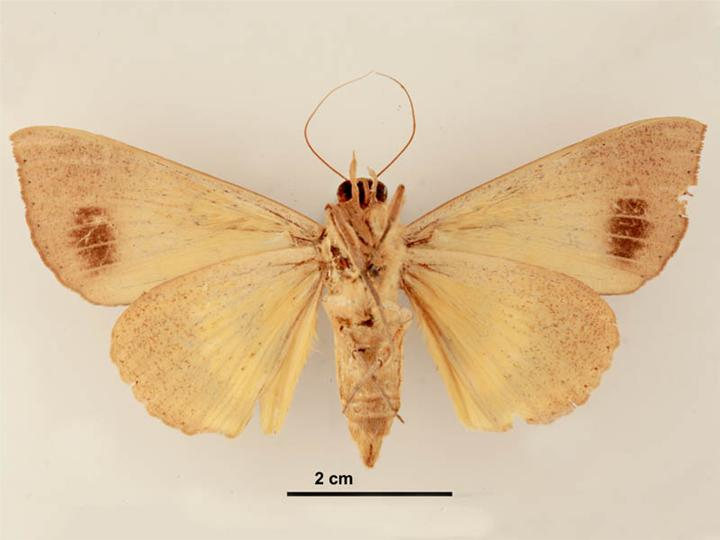
Male, ventral view
