= Gnamptonyx innexa =

Scientific classification
- Kingdom: Animalia
- Phylum: Arthropoda
- Class: Insecta
- Order: Lepidoptera
- Superfamily: Noctuoidea
- Family: Erebidae
- Genus: Gnamptonyx
- Species: G. innexa

Binomial name
- Gnamptonyx innexa (Walker, 1858)

Synonyms
- Homoptera vilis; Alamis rufomixta

Species of moth

Gnamptonyx innexa is a species of moth in the family Erebidae first described by Francis Walker in 1858. The species is found from Morocco to the Arabian Peninsula, Israel, Iran, Afghanistan, Pakistan and western India.

There are multiple generations per year. Adults are on wing in February, June and October in Israel.

The larvae probably feed on Acacia species.
