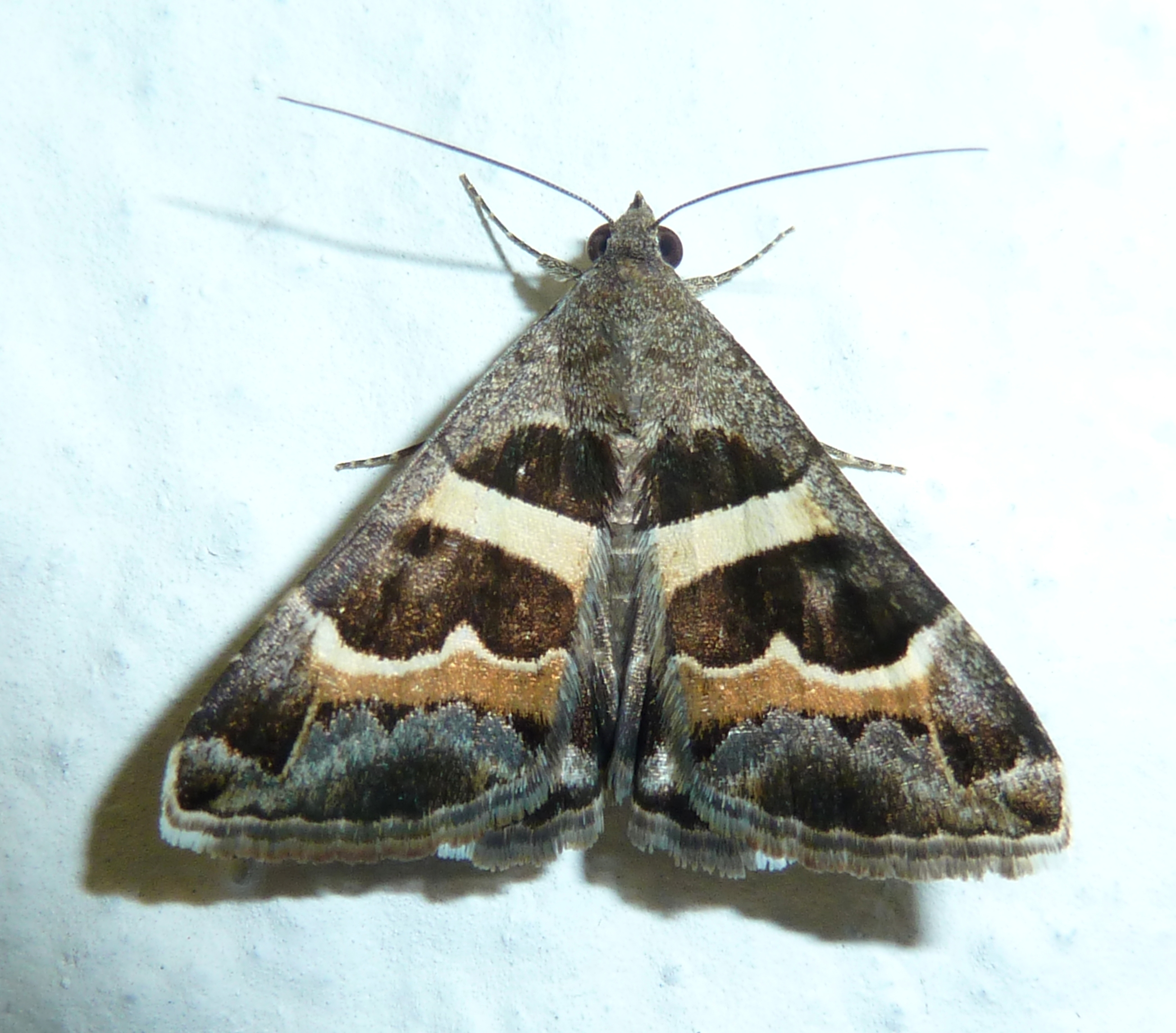

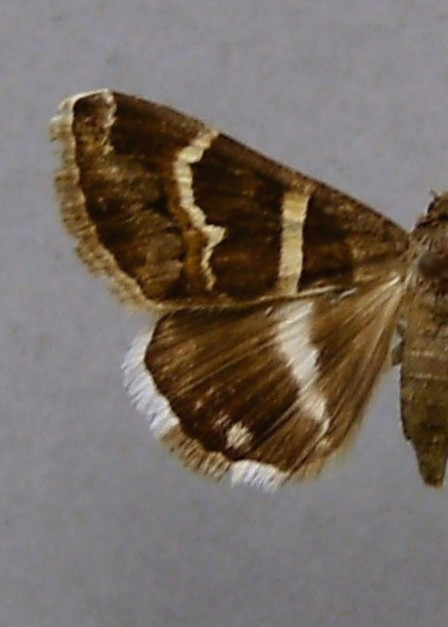

Scientific classification
- Kingdom: Animalia
- Phylum: Arthropoda
- Class: Insecta
- Order: Lepidoptera
- Superfamily: Noctuoidea
- Family: Erebidae
- Genus: Grammodes
- Species: G. stolida

Binomial name
- Grammodes stolida (Fabricius, 1775)

Synonyms
- Prodotis stolida; Noctua stolida; Noctua cingularis; Euclidia stupida; Grammodes curvilinea; Grammodes attenuata; Grammodes incompleta; Grammodes odontota Turner, 1925

= Grammodes stolida =

Geometrician

Species of moth

Grammodes stolida, the geometrician, is a moth of the family Erebidae. The species was first described by Johan Christian Fabricius in 1775. It is found in Africa, southern Europe, most of Asia and Australia. It migrates to central and northern Europe as far north as England, Denmark and Finland.

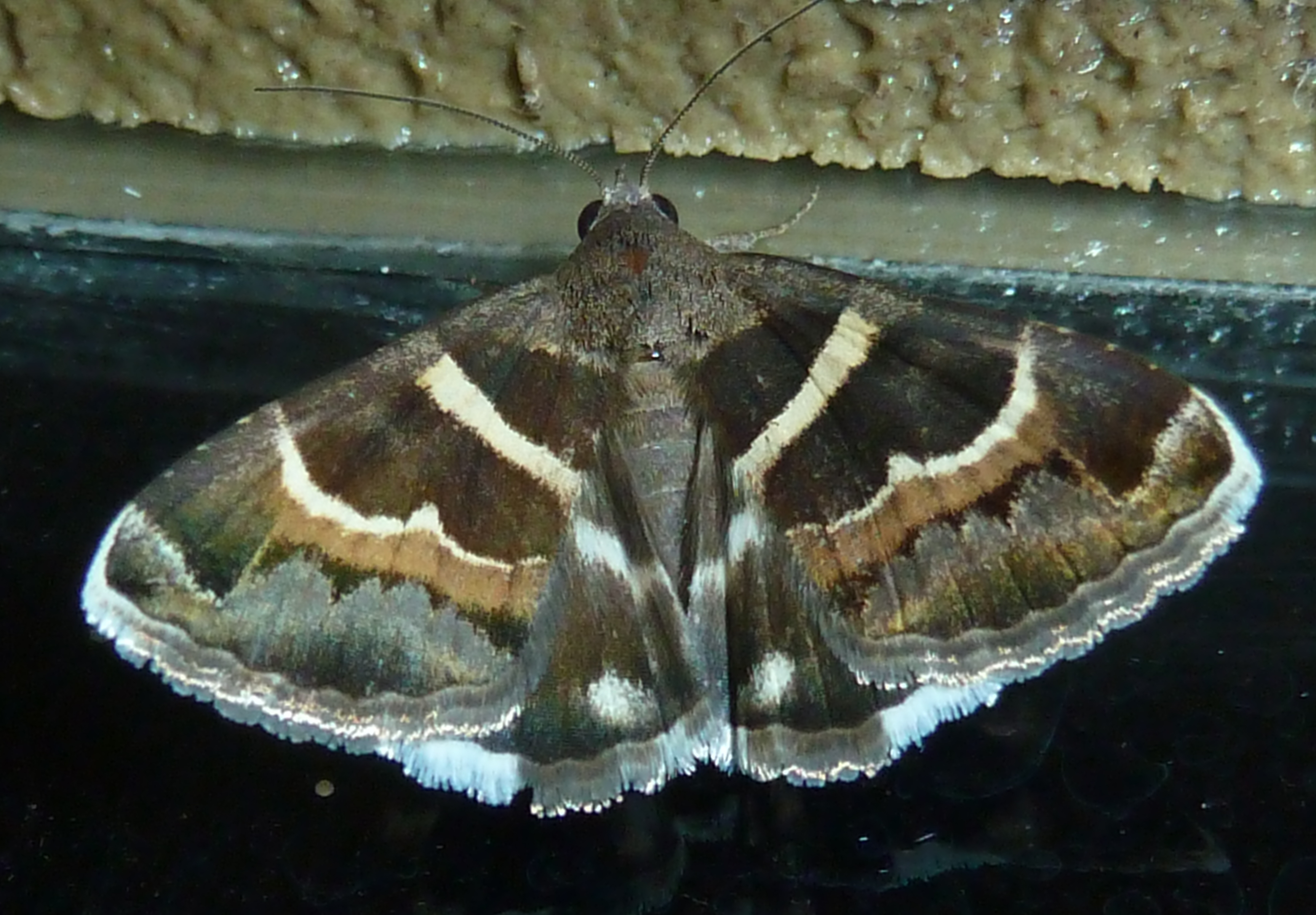

== Technical description and variation ==
Forewing: basal two-thirds black brown, with basal patch, costal streak, and reniform stigma fuscous grey; crossed at middle by a pale ochreous band oblique from subcostal and widening downwards, its outer half yellowish; limited externally by a biconcave ochreous band, narrower below, followed below vein 6 by a broad brown band, on the outer edge of which are three or four irregular black patches, and above and beyond it on costa a black blotch, sharply angled externally on vein 6, these black marks forming the inner edge of a diffuse submarginal pale line; terminal area shaded with brown and fuscous, with a short black apical streak and a diffuse dark cloud below the middle; fringe grey with white base, altogether whitish round apex: hindwing olive fuscous, becoming blackish towards termen; a white band from costa at one-third to anal angle, and a round white submarginal spot in submedian fold; fringe brightly white, but grey between veins 2 and 4; the form stupida H.-Sch. (? spec. dist.) from Salonica, Macedonia, has the bands marked with yellow only at inner margin, indicated merely by two straight dark streaks: the outer band more strongly bent inwards to costa; the white band of hindwing not straight but forming two curves; in the ab. attenuata ab. nov. [Warren] the white band is merely a narrow line from cell to inner margin.

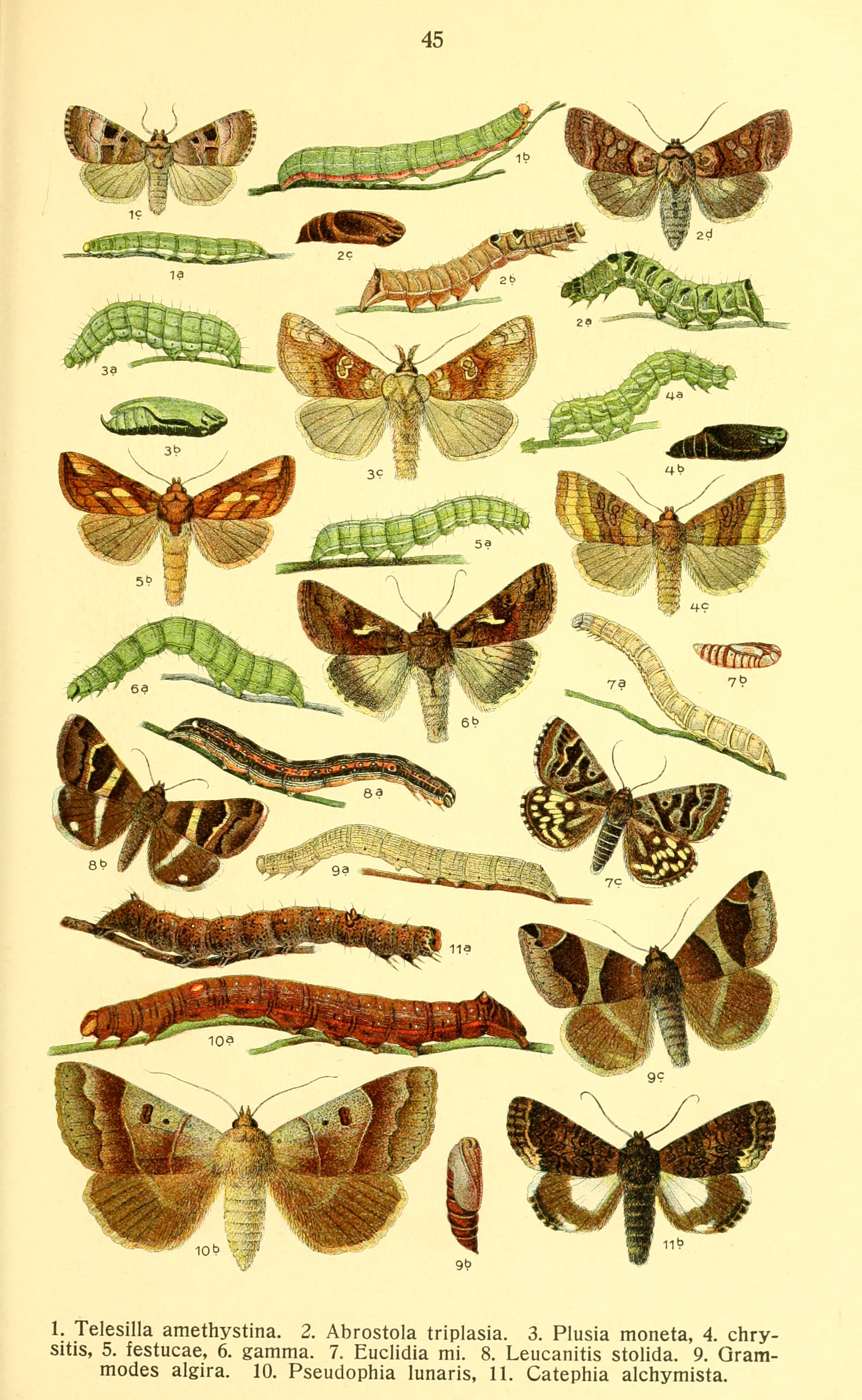
Moth and larva in Karl Eckstein Die Schmetterlinge DeutschlandsLarva and moth (figures 8a, 8b)

== Biology ==
There are multiple generations per year. Adults are on wing from February to October.

Larva reddish yellow, paler on dorsum and along spiracles, marked with fine black longitudinal streaks; dorsal and subdorsal stripes dark grey, the former widening beyond the 5th segment; spiraeular lineline, double: dorsal tubercles large, while ringed with black.

The larvae feed on Paliurus, Rubus, Tribulus, Coriaria and Quercus species.
