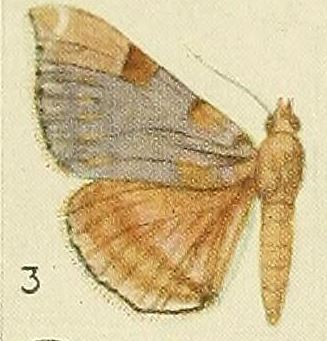

Scientific classification
- Kingdom: Animalia
- Phylum: Arthropoda
- Class: Insecta
- Order: Lepidoptera
- Superfamily: Noctuoidea
- Family: Erebidae
- Tribe: Ophiusini
- Genus: Euphiusa; Hampson, 1902

= Euphiusa =

Genus of moths

Euphiusa is a monotypic genus of moths in the family Erebidae. Its sole species is Euphiusa harmonica (Hampson, 1902).
