= Grammodes quaesita =

Scientific classification
- Kingdom: Animalia
- Phylum: Arthropoda
- Class: Insecta
- Order: Lepidoptera
- Superfamily: Noctuoidea
- Family: Erebidae
- Genus: Grammodes
- Species: G. quaesita

Binomial name
- Grammodes quaesita C. Swinhoe, 1901

Species of moth

Grammodes quaesita is a moth of the family Noctuidae first described by Charles Swinhoe in 1901. It is found in Australia's Northern Territory and Queensland.

Its wingspan is about 30 mm.
