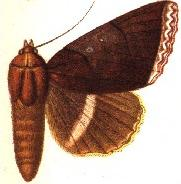

Scientific classification
- Kingdom: Animalia
- Phylum: Arthropoda
- Class: Insecta
- Order: Lepidoptera
- Superfamily: Noctuoidea
- Family: Erebidae
- Genus: Artena
- Species: A. rubida

Binomial name
- Artena rubida (Walker, 1863)

Synonyms
- Ophisma rubida Walker, 1863; Lagoptera rubida

= Artena rubida =

Species of moth

Artena rubida is a species of moth of the family Erebidae. It is found in north-eastern part of the Himalaya, south-east China, Thailand, the Andamans and Sundaland.
