= Artena convergens =

Scientific classification
- Domain: Eukaryota
- Kingdom: Animalia
- Phylum: Arthropoda
- Class: Insecta
- Order: Lepidoptera
- Superfamily: Noctuoidea
- Family: Erebidae
- Genus: Artena
- Species: A. convergens

Binomial name
- Artena convergens (Gaede, 1917)

Synonyms
- Lagoptera convergens Gaede, 1917; Artena ochrobrunnea L.B. Prout, 1919; Thyas ochrobrunnea

Species of moth

Artena convergens is a species of moth of the family Erebidae. It is found in Thailand, Peninsular Malaysia, Sumatra, Borneo and New Guinea.

== Subspecies ==
- Artena convergens convergens
- Artena convergens nicanora (New Guinea)
