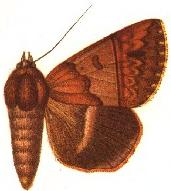

Scientific classification
- Kingdom: Animalia
- Phylum: Arthropoda
- Class: Insecta
- Order: Lepidoptera
- Superfamily: Noctuoidea
- Family: Erebidae
- Genus: Artena
- Species: A. certior

Binomial name
- Artena certior (Walker, 1858)

Synonyms
- Lagoptera certior; Ophisma certior Walker, 1858; Ophisma contenta Walker, 1858; Ophisma rectilinea Snellen, 1877; Ophisma siamica Walker, 1865

= Artena certior =

Species of moth

Artena certior is a species of moth of the family Erebidae first described by Francis Walker in 1858. It is found in Thailand, India and on Java.
