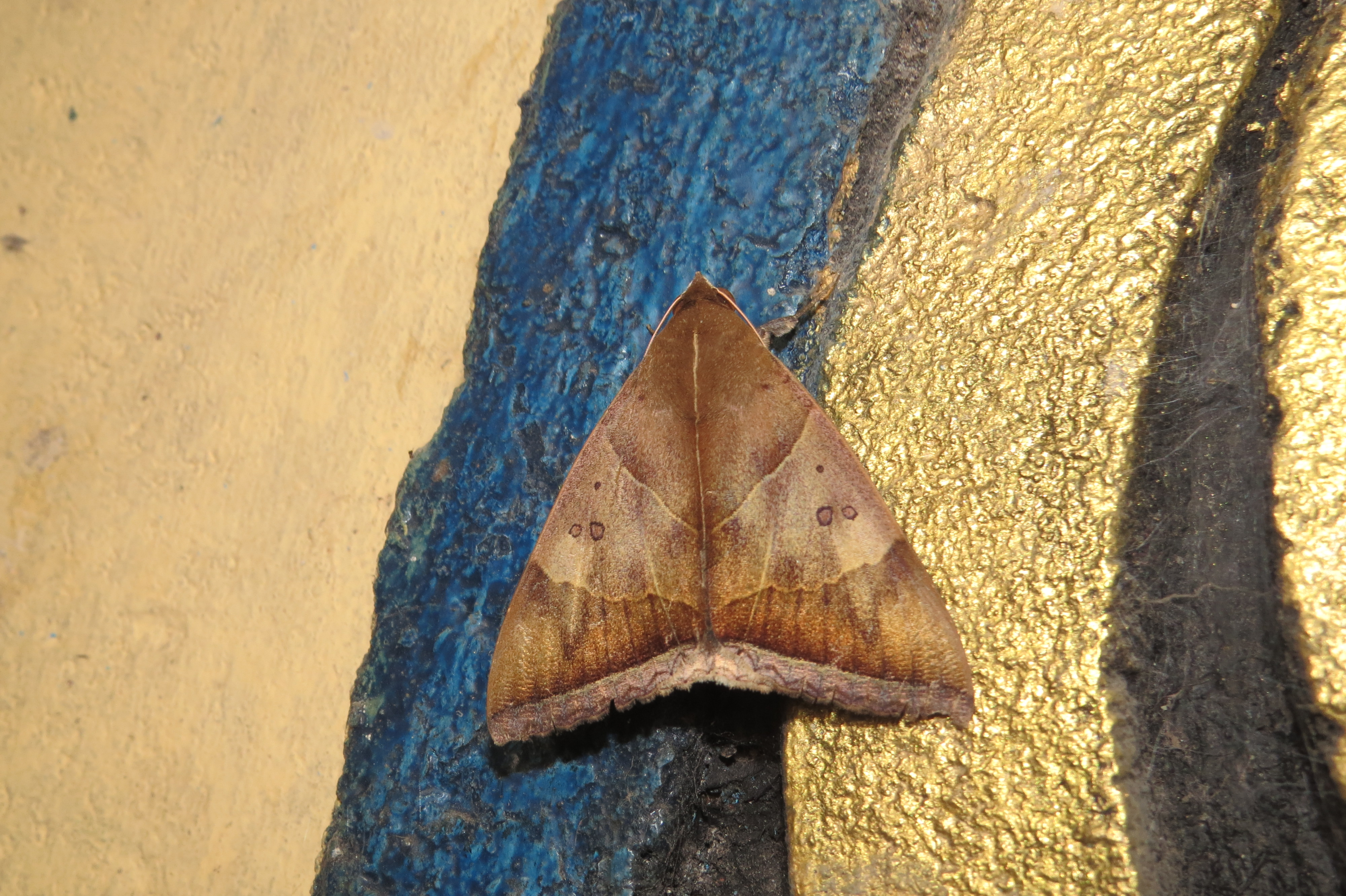
- Artena dotata at Sabarimala

Scientific classification
- Kingdom: Animalia
- Phylum: Arthropoda
- Class: Insecta
- Order: Lepidoptera
- Superfamily: Noctuoidea
- Family: Erebidae
- Tribe: Ophiusini
- Genus: Artena; Walker, 1858

= Artena (moth) =

Genus of moths

Artena is a genus of moths in the family Erebidae. The genus was erected by Francis Walker in 1858.

== Species ==
- Artena angulata (Roepke, 1938)
- Artena certior (Walker, 1858)
- Artena convergens (Gaede, 1917)
- Artena dotata (Fabricius, 1794)
- Artena durfa (Plotz, 1880)
- Artena eccentrica Yoshimoto, 1999
- Artena inversa (Walker, 1858)
- Artena lacteicincta (Hampson, 1912)
- Artena rubida (Walker, 1863)
- Artena submira Walker, 1858
- Artena velutina L. B. Prout, 1919

Alberto Zilli and Willem Hogenes raised Artena velutina, originally described as a subspecies of Artena rubida, to species status in 2004.
