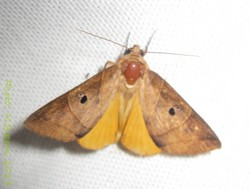
- Thyas parallelipipeda

Scientific classification
- Kingdom: Animalia
- Phylum: Arthropoda
- Clade: Pancrustacea
- Class: Insecta
- Order: Lepidoptera
- Superfamily: Noctuoidea
- Family: Erebidae
- Tribe: Ophiusini
- Genus: Thyas; Hübner, 1824

Synonyms
- Lagoptera Guenée

= Thyas =

Genus of moths

Thyas is a genus of moths in the family Erebidae. The genus was erected by Jacob Hübner in 1824.

== Species ==
- Thyas androgyna (Berio, 1954)
- Thyas arcifera (Hampson, 1913)
- Thyas coronata (Fabricius, 1775)
- Thyas honesta Hübner, 1824
- Thyas javanica (Gaede, 1917)
- Thyas juno (Dalman, 1823)
- Thyas metaphaea (Hampson, 1913)
- Thyas meterythra (Hampson, 1918)
- Thyas miniacea (Felder & Rogenhofer, 1874)
- Thyas minians (Mabille, 1884)
- Thyas nubilata (Holland, 1920)
- Thyas parallelipipeda (Guenée, 1852)
- Thyas quadrilineata (Strand, 1912)
- Thyas rubricata (Holland, 1894)

== Gallery ==
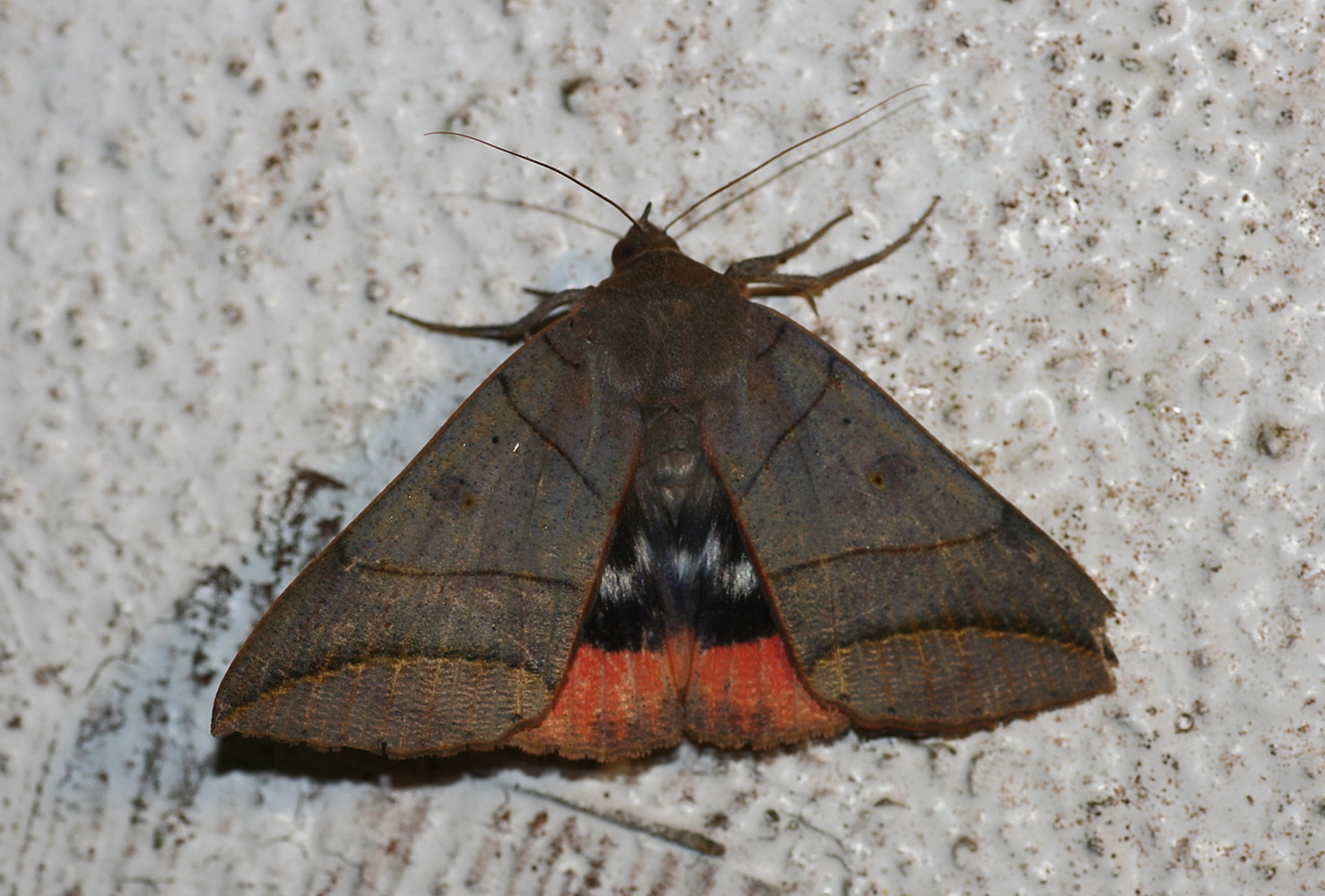
Thyas juno

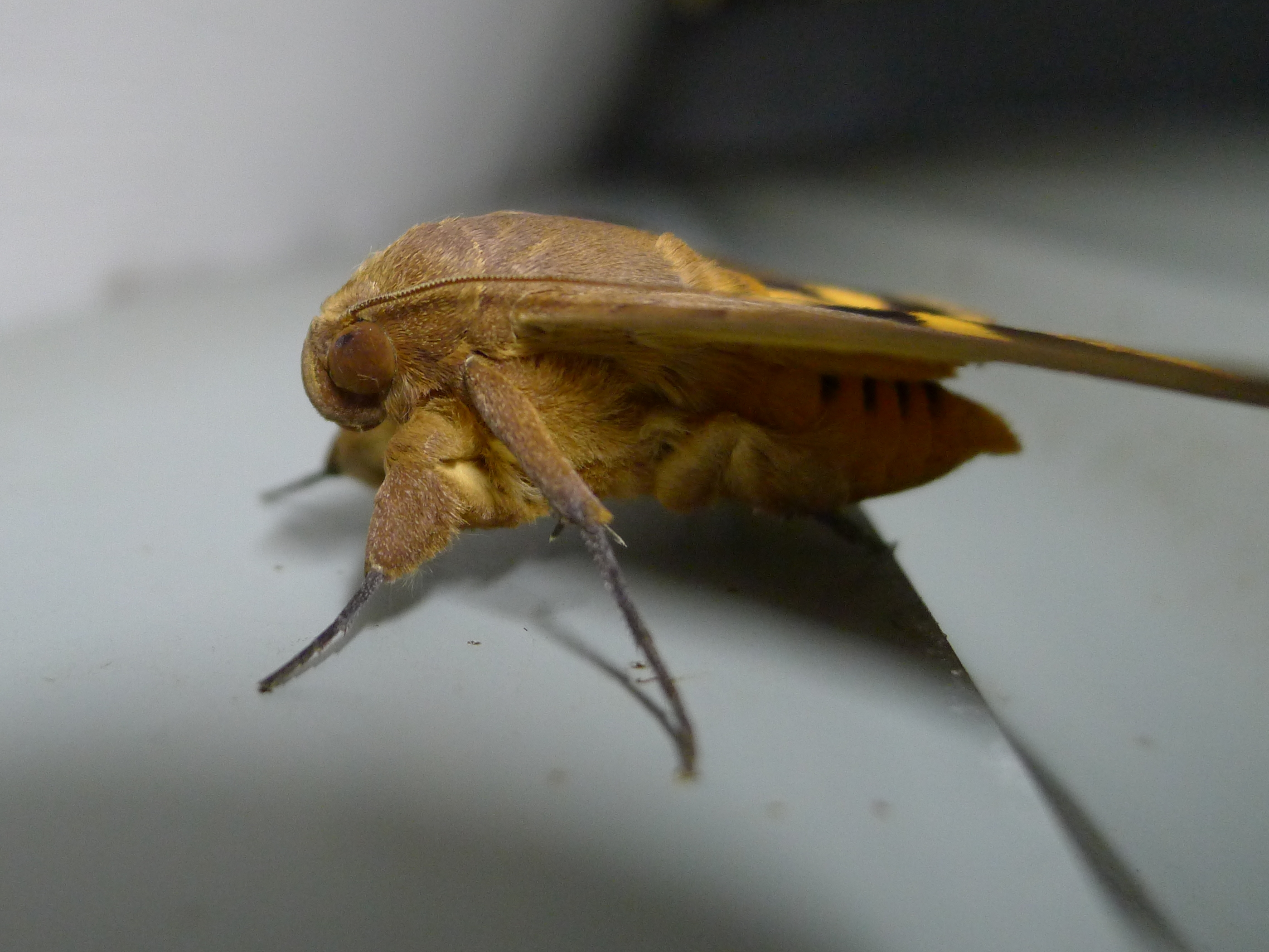
Thyas coronata
