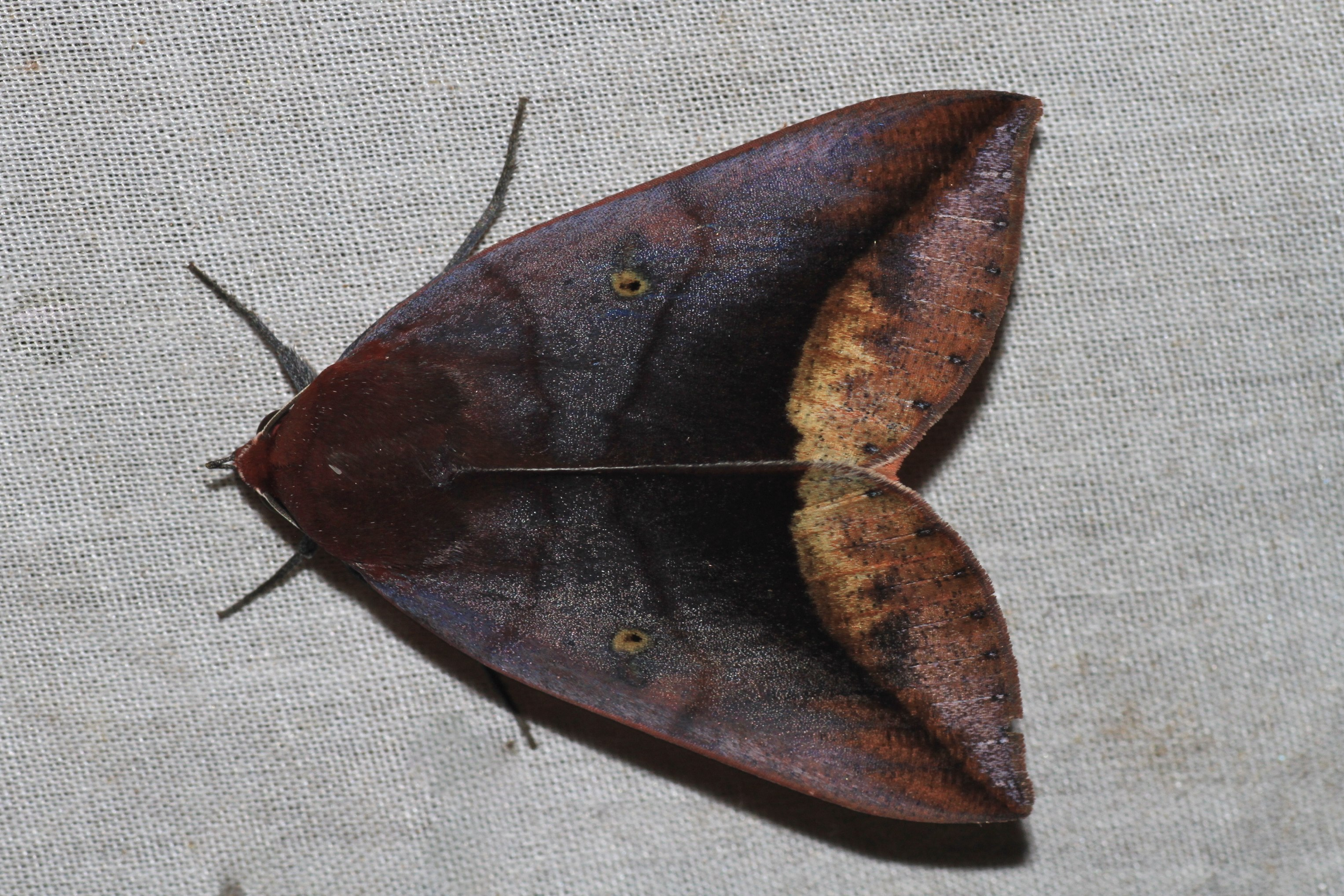

Scientific classification
- Kingdom: Animalia
- Phylum: Arthropoda
- Class: Insecta
- Order: Lepidoptera
- Superfamily: Noctuoidea
- Family: Erebidae
- Genus: Thyas
- Species: T. javanica

Binomial name
- Thyas javanica (Gaede, 1917)

Synonyms
- Dermaleipa javanica Gaede, 1917; Dermaleipa joiceyi Prout, 1924; Dermaleipa javanica defasciata Gaede, 1938; Lagoptera javanica acaerulea Holloway, 1976; Lagoptera javanica Gaede; Kobes, 1985; Thyas javanica acaerulea

= Thyas javanica =

Species of moth

Thyas javanica is a species of moth of the family Erebidae. It is found on Sumatra, Java, Bali, the Peninsular Malaysia and Borneo.

== Subspecies ==
- Thyas javanica javanica
- Thyas javanica defasciata (Borneo)
