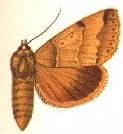

Scientific classification
- Kingdom: Animalia
- Phylum: Arthropoda
- Class: Insecta
- Order: Lepidoptera
- Superfamily: Noctuoidea
- Family: Erebidae
- Genus: Minucia
- Species: M. wiskotti

Binomial name
- Minucia wiskotti Püngeler, 1902

Synonyms
- Minucia viscotti Hampson, 1913

= Minucia wiskotti =

Species of moth

Minucia wiskotti is a species of moth in the family Erebidae first described by Rudolf Püngeler in 1902. The species is endemic to the mountains surrounding the Rift Valley and mountainous areas in Jordan.

There is one generation per year. Adults are on wing in May.

The larvae probably feed on Quercus species.
