= Grammodes oculicola =

Scientific classification
- Kingdom: Animalia
- Phylum: Arthropoda
- Class: Insecta
- Order: Lepidoptera
- Superfamily: Noctuoidea
- Family: Erebidae
- Genus: Grammodes
- Species: G. oculicola

Binomial name
- Grammodes oculicola Walker, 1858

Synonyms
- Grammodes omatophora Lower, 1895

Species of moth

Grammodes oculicola, the small-eyed box-owlet, is a moth of the family Noctuidae first described by Francis Walker in 1858. It is found in the South Pacific basin, from Australia to the Society Islands.

The wingspan is about 30 mm.
