= Rhabdophera =

Scientific classification
- Kingdom: Animalia
- Phylum: Arthropoda
- Class: Insecta
- Order: Lepidoptera
- Superfamily: Noctuoidea
- Family: Erebidae
- Tribe: Ophiusini
- Genus: Rhabdophera; Staudinger, 1897

Genus of moths

Rhabdophera is a genus of moths in the family Erebidae.

== Species ==
- Rhabdophera arefacta (Swinhoe, 1884)
