= Elousa albicans =

Scientific classification
- Kingdom: Animalia
- Phylum: Arthropoda
- Class: Insecta
- Order: Lepidoptera
- Superfamily: Noctuoidea
- Family: Erebidae
- Genus: Elousa
- Species: E. albicans

Binomial name
- Elousa albicans Walker, 1858

Species of moth

Elousa albicans is a species of moth in the family Erebidae. It is found in North America.

The MONA or Hodges number for Elousa albicans is 8661.1.
