= Artena angulata =

Scientific classification
- Domain: Eukaryota
- Kingdom: Animalia
- Phylum: Arthropoda
- Class: Insecta
- Order: Lepidoptera
- Superfamily: Noctuoidea
- Family: Erebidae
- Genus: Artena
- Species: A. angulata

Binomial name
- Artena angulata (Roepke, 1938)

Synonyms
- Lagoptera angulata Roepke, 1938

Species of moth

Artena angulata is a species of moth of the family Erebidae first described by Walter Karl Johann Roepke in 1938. It is found on Sumatra and Sulawesi.
