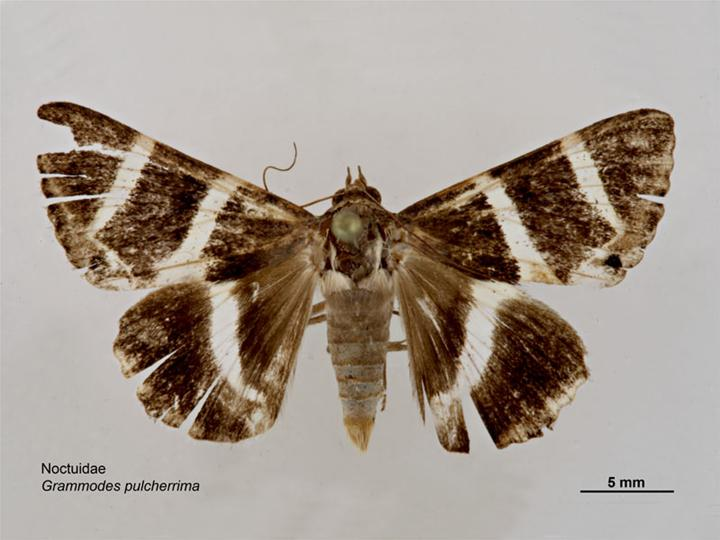
- Dorsal view
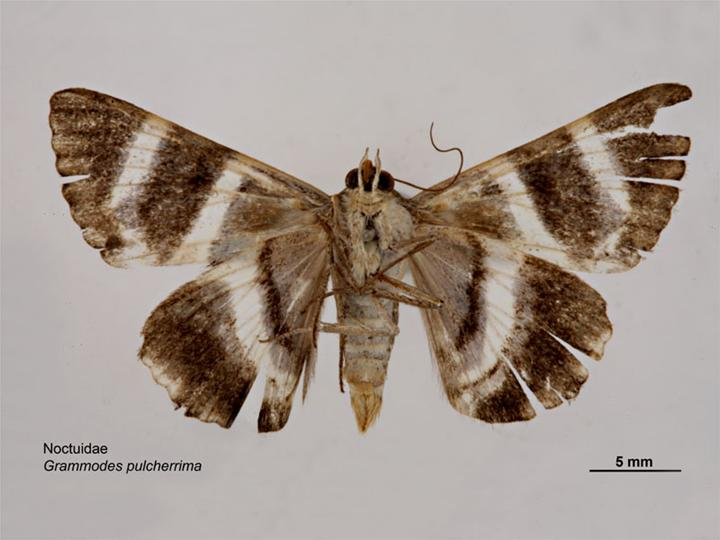
- Ventral view

Scientific classification
- Kingdom: Animalia
- Phylum: Arthropoda
- Class: Insecta
- Order: Lepidoptera
- Superfamily: Noctuoidea
- Family: Erebidae
- Genus: Grammodes
- Species: G. pulcherrima

Binomial name
- Grammodes pulcherrima T. P. Lucas, 1892

Synonyms
- Grammodes clementi Swinhoe, 1901; Prodotis clementi (Swinhoe, 1901); Ophiusa pulcherrima(T. P. Lucas, 1892)

= Grammodes pulcherrima =

Species of moth

Grammodes pulcherrima, the comely box-owlet, is a moth of the family Noctuidae first described by Thomas Pennington Lucas in 1892. It is found in the northern half of Australia.
