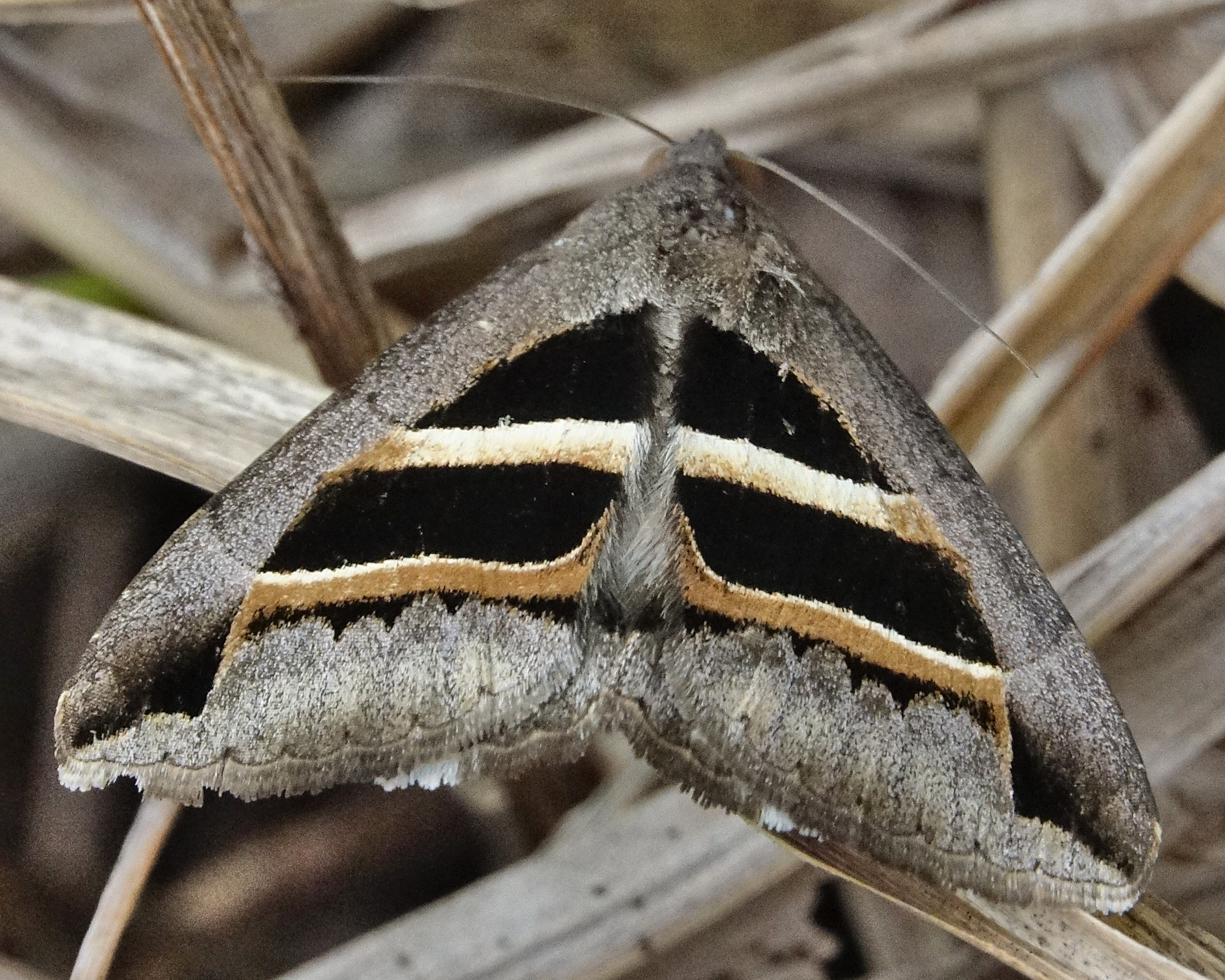

Scientific classification
- Kingdom: Animalia
- Phylum: Arthropoda
- Class: Insecta
- Order: Lepidoptera
- Superfamily: Noctuoidea
- Family: Erebidae
- Genus: Grammodes
- Species: G. geometrica

Binomial name
- Grammodes geometrica (Fabricius, 1775)

Synonyms
- Noctua geometrica Fabricius, 1775; Phalaena ammonia Cramer, [1779]; Grammodes bifulvata Warren, 1913; Grammodes orientalis Warren, 1913

= Grammodes geometrica =

Species of moth

Grammodes geometrica is a moth found from the Mediterranean east to Oriental and Australasian tropics of India, Sri Lanka, Java and Australia. The adult is a fruit piercer. The species was first described by Johan Christian Fabricius in 1775.

== Taxonomy ==
Grammodes moths were formerly classified in the family Noctuidae. Former noctuid moths are mostly classified in the family Erebidae now, along with all of the former members of the families Arctiidae and Lymantriidae. This reclassification has not yet met with general consensus, and many resources and publications still follow the older classification scheme (e.g.).

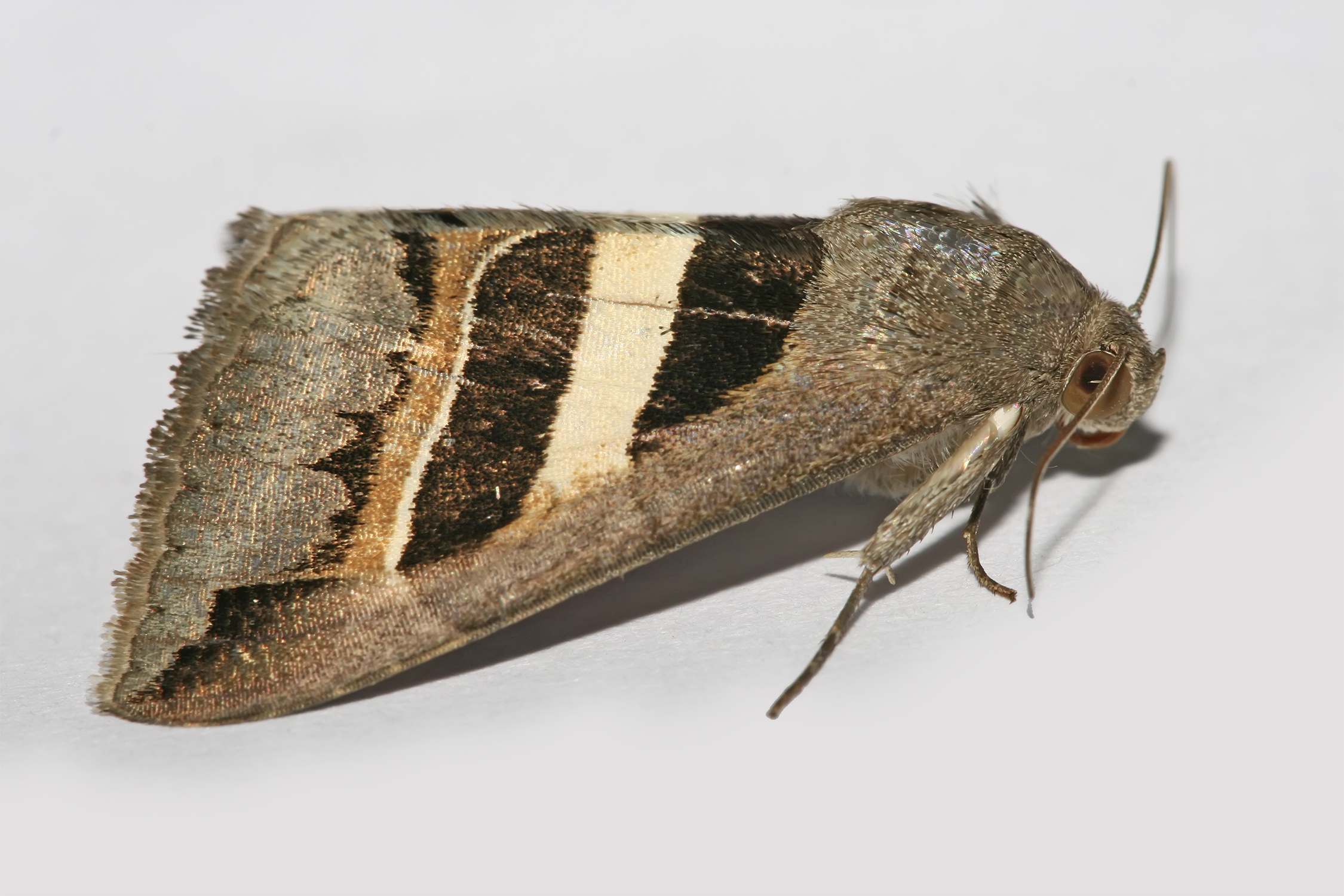
Ventral aspects

== Description ==
Its wingspan ranges from 26 to 45 mm. Body greyish brown. Forewings with a large black patch occupying the whole wing except the basal, costal and outer area. Its outer edge waved ad joined by an oblique streak from the apex. Antemedial and postmedial lines curved inwards below the costa with whitish bands outside them on the black patch. The outer part of the postmedial band pale fulvous colored. Hindwings fuscous, with medial pale band. Cilia with white apex and anal angle.

Larva is an elongated semi-looper. Tubercles absent. Head is pale ochreous with black spots. Body with longitudinal red lines dorsally and dorso-laterally. The larvae feed on Phyllanthus, Cistus, Diospyros, Ricinus, Oryza, various grasses, Polygonum, Ziziphus and Tamarix species.

== Subspecies ==
- G. g. orientalis Warren, 1913
