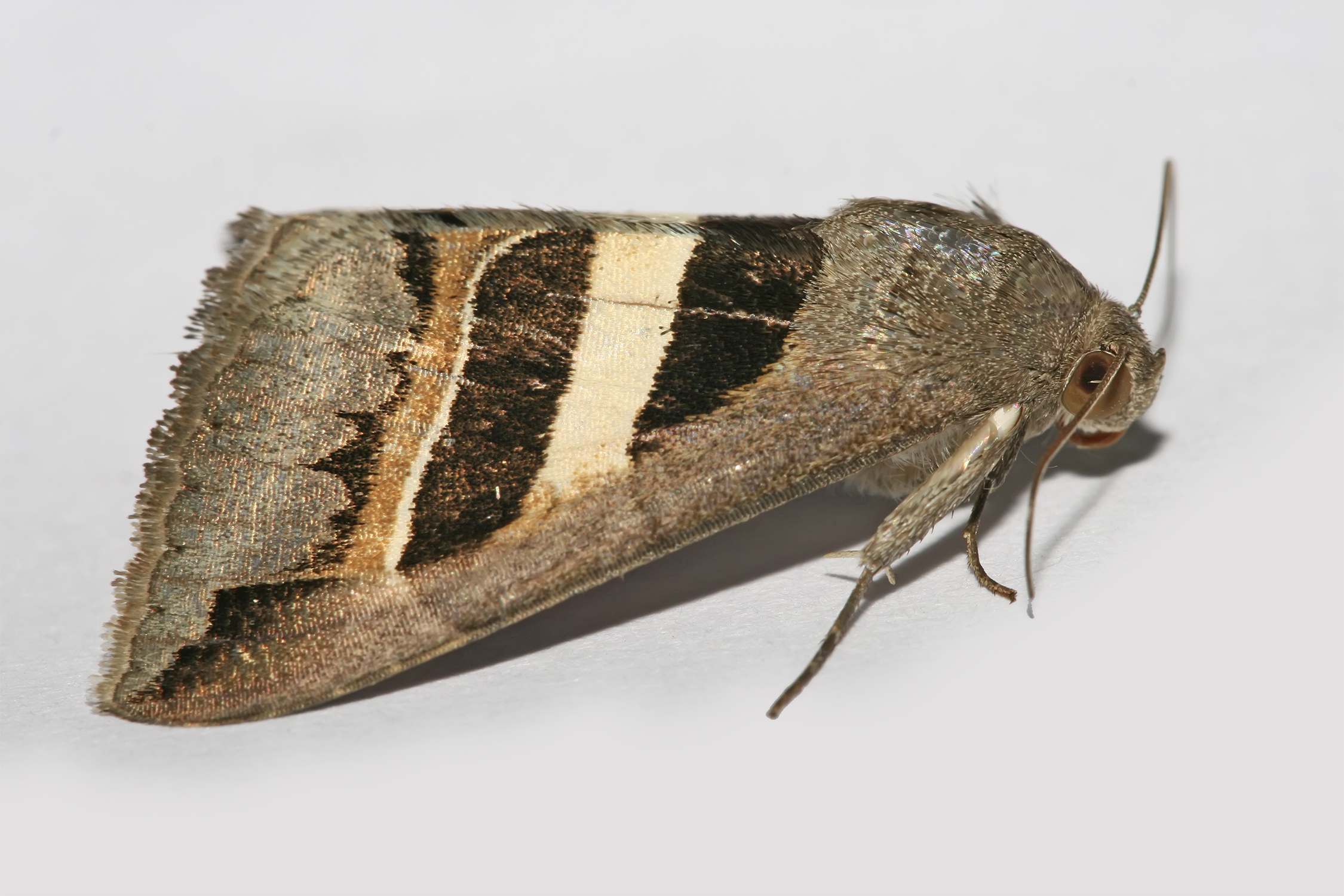
- Grammodes geometrica

Scientific classification
- Kingdom: Animalia
- Phylum: Arthropoda
- Class: Insecta
- Order: Lepidoptera
- Superfamily: Noctuoidea
- Family: Erebidae
- Tribe: Ophiusini
- Genus: Grammodes; Guenée, 1852

Synonyms
- Prodotis John, 1910

= Grammodes =

Genus of moths

Grammodes is a genus of moths in the family Erebidae first described by Achille Guenée in 1852.

== Description ==
Palpi upturned, reaching just above vertex of head and minute third joint. Antennae almost simple in male. Thorax and abdomen smoothly scaled and somewhat slender. Tibia clothed with rather long hair. Min tibia spiny. Forewings short and broad with somewhat acute apex. Larva with three pairs of abdominal prolegs.

== Species ==
- Grammodes afrocculta Berio, 1956
- Grammodes arenosa Swinhoe, 1902
- Grammodes bifasciata Petagna, 1738 (syn: Grammodes chalciptera (Borkhausen, 1792), Grammodes linearis (Hübner, 1790), Grammodes paralellaris (Hübner, 1803))
- Grammodes boisdeffrii Oberthür, 1867
- Grammodes buchanani Rothschild, 1921
- Grammodes congenita Walker, 1858
- Grammodes congesta Berio, 1956
- Grammodes cooma Swinhoe, 1900
- Grammodes diagarmma Lower, 1903
- Grammodes euclidioides Guenée, 1852 (syn: Grammodes dubitans (Walker, 1858), Grammodes postfumida (Wiltshire, 1970))
- Grammodes geometrica (Fabricius, 1775)
- Grammodes justa Walker, 1858
- Grammodes latifera Walker, 1870
- Grammodes marwitzi Gaede, 1914
- Grammodes microgonia (Hampson, 1910)
- Grammodes monodonta Berio, 1956 (syn: Grammodes somaliensis Berio, 1956)
- Grammodes netta Holland, 1897
- Grammodes occulta Berio, 1956 (syn: Grammodes samosira Kobes, 1985)
- Grammodes ocellata Tepper, 1890
- Grammodes oculata Snellen, 1880
- Grammodes oculicola Walker, 1858
- Grammodes paerambar Brandt, 1939
- Grammodes pulcherrima Lucas, 1892
- Grammodes quaesita Swinhoe, 1901
- Grammodes stolida (Fabricius, 1775) – geometrician
