= Grammodes boisdeffrii =

Scientific classification
- Kingdom: Animalia
- Phylum: Arthropoda
- Class: Insecta
- Order: Lepidoptera
- Superfamily: Noctuoidea
- Family: Erebidae
- Genus: Grammodes
- Species: G. boisdeffrii

Binomial name
- Grammodes boisdeffrii Oberthür, 1867

Synonyms
- Prodotis boisdeffrii; Grammodes palaestinensis Staudinger 1897

Species of moth

Grammodes boisdeffrii is a moth of the family Noctuidae first described by Charles Oberthür in 1867. It is found from the northern and western parts of the Sahara to Egypt, Israel and Lebanon.

There are multiple generations per year. Adults are on wing year round.

== Subspecies ==
- Grammodes boisdeffrii boisdeffrii
- Grammodes boisdeffrii palaestinensis
