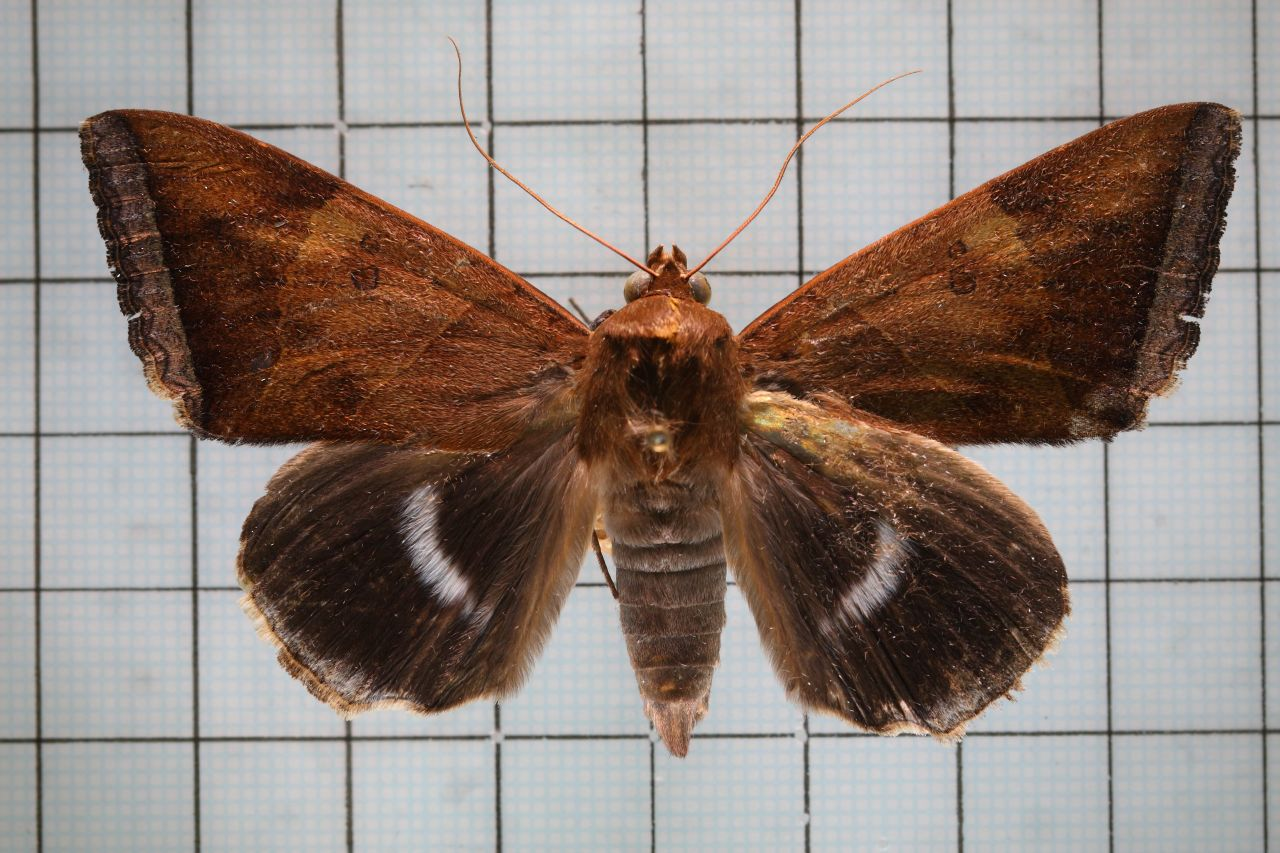

Scientific classification
- Kingdom: Animalia
- Phylum: Arthropoda
- Class: Insecta
- Order: Lepidoptera
- Superfamily: Noctuoidea
- Family: Erebidae
- Genus: Artena
- Species: A. dotata

Binomial name
- Artena dotata (Fabricius, 1794)

Synonyms
- Noctua dotata Fabricius, 1794; Thyas dotata (Fabricius)

= Artena dotata =

Species of moth

Artena dotata is a species of moth of the family Erebidae. It is found from the Indian subregion to Sri Lanka, Taiwan, Japan, Sumatra and Borneo.

== Description ==
Its wingspan is about 72 mm. The body is bronze brown. Forewings with a white speck in the cell. Antemedial and postmedial lines of forewings are very oblique, where antemedials are not waved and postmedials very slightly waved. Reniform broken up into two spots. A prominent marginal greyish band with a waved line found on it. Hindwings with prominent medial incomplete white band. The margin and cilia whitish. Ventral side with pale basal areas in both wings.

Spherical eggs are blue green and vertically ridged. Larvae spidery with the comb-like true legs on a thick thorax. Abdomen long. Primary setae are long. Third-instar larvae light brown with a white line series, which running longitudinally. Pupa typically ophiusine form.

The larvae feed on Combretum, Getonia, Quisqualis and Terminalia species.
