= Rhabdophera arefacta =

Scientific classification
- Kingdom: Animalia
- Phylum: Arthropoda
- Class: Insecta
- Order: Lepidoptera
- Superfamily: Noctuoidea
- Family: Erebidae
- Genus: Rhabdophera
- Species: R. arefacta

Binomial name
- Rhabdophera arefacta Swinhoe, 1884

Synonyms
- Rhabdophera messrae Staudinger, 1897

Species of moth

Rhabdophera arefacta is a species of moth in the family Erebidae first described by Charles Swinhoe in 1884. The species is found in India, Pakistan, Egypt, Israel, Jordan and Iraq.

There are multiple generations per year. Adults are on wing from March to November.

The larvae feed on Prosopis stephaniana.
