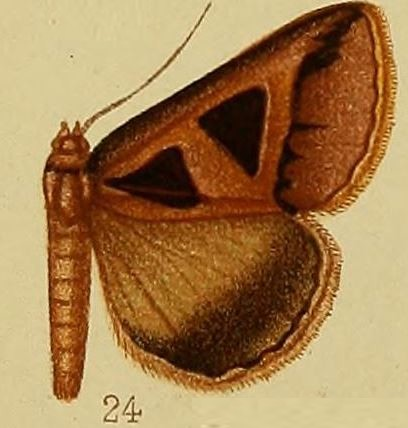

Scientific classification
- Kingdom: Animalia
- Phylum: Arthropoda
- Class: Insecta
- Order: Lepidoptera
- Superfamily: Noctuoidea
- Family: Erebidae
- Genus: Grammodes
- Species: G. microgonia

Binomial name
- Grammodes microgonia (Hampson, 1910)

Synonyms
- Chalciope microgonia Hampson, 1910

= Grammodes microgonia =

Species of moth

Grammodes microgonia is a moth of the family Erebidae first described by George Hampson in 1910.

== Distribution ==
This species is known from Zambia.
