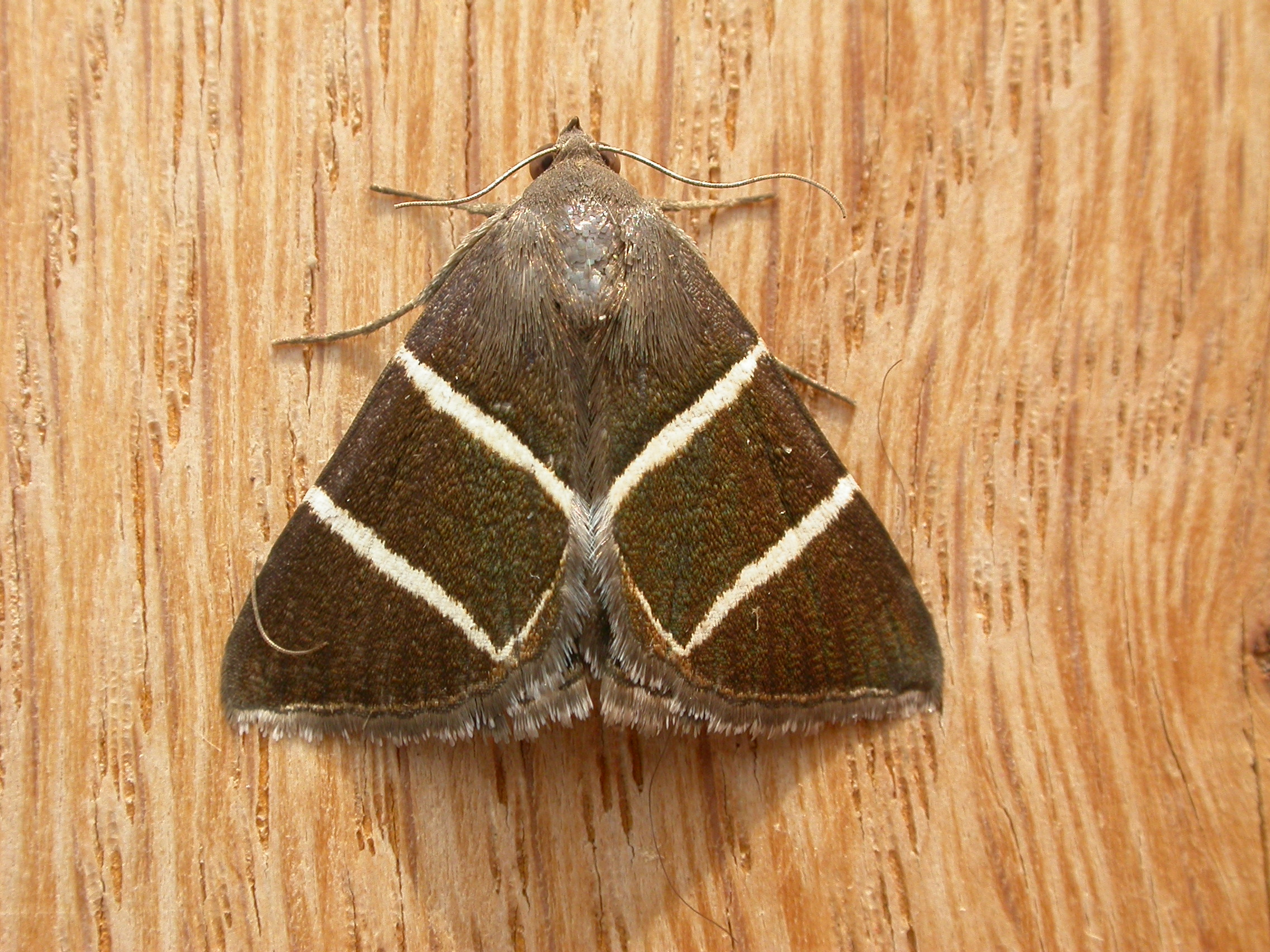

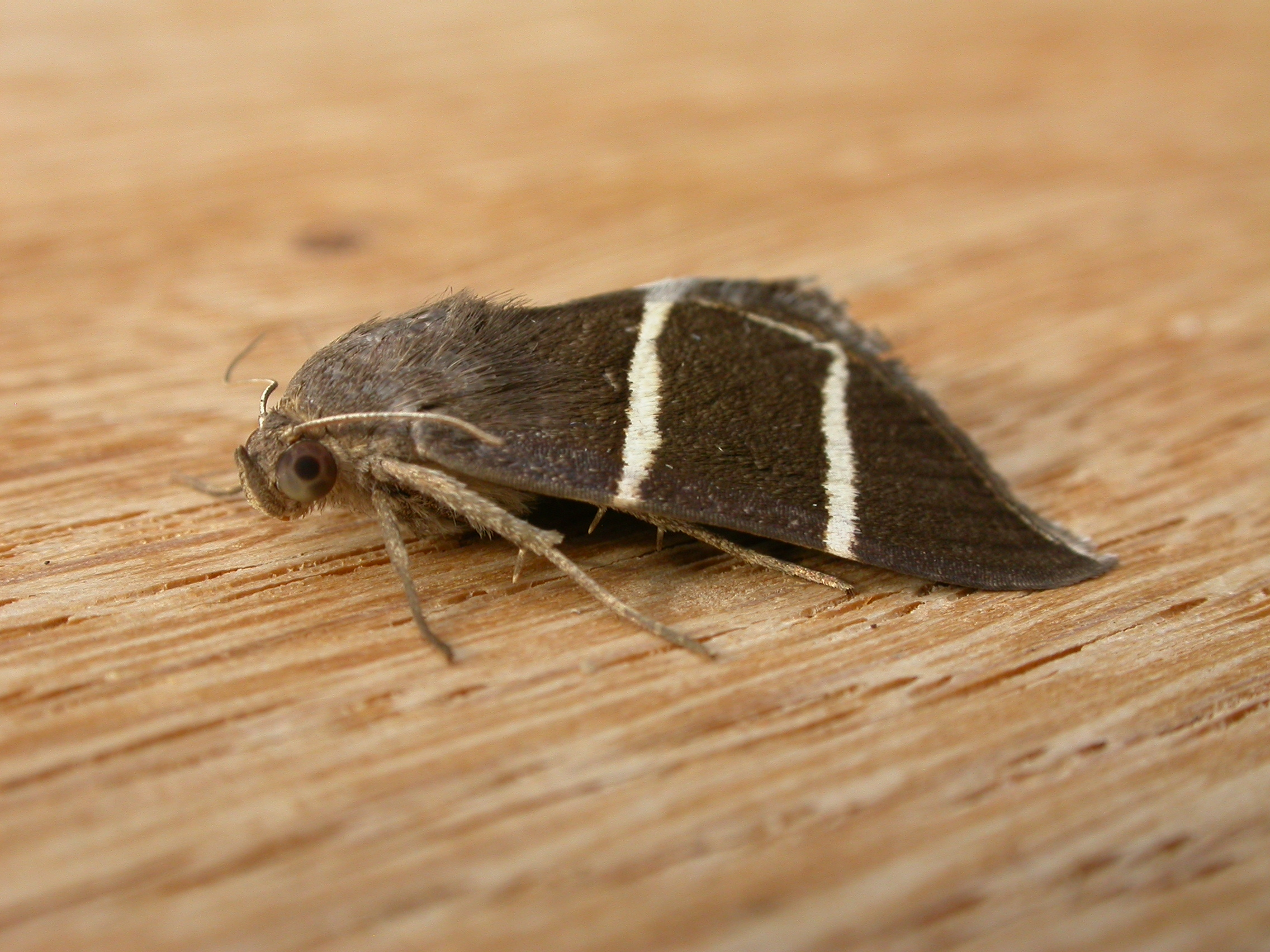

Scientific classification
- Kingdom: Animalia
- Phylum: Arthropoda
- Class: Insecta
- Order: Lepidoptera
- Superfamily: Noctuoidea
- Family: Erebidae
- Genus: Grammodes
- Species: G. justa

Binomial name
- Grammodes justa Walker, 1858

Synonyms
- Grammodes caeca Pagenstecher, 1900; Prodotis caeca (Pagenstecher, 1900)

= Grammodes justa =

Species of moth

Grammodes justa, the plain box-owlet, is a moth of the family Noctuidae first described by Francis Walker in 1858. It is found in the northern half of Australia and Papua New Guinea.

The wingspan is about 40 mm. The moths prefer the warmer climate of northern Australia and are considered a pest in the Northern Territory.
