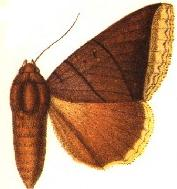

Scientific classification
- Kingdom: Animalia
- Phylum: Arthropoda
- Class: Insecta
- Order: Lepidoptera
- Superfamily: Noctuoidea
- Family: Erebidae
- Genus: Artena
- Species: A. lacteicincta

Binomial name
- Artena lacteicincta (Hampson, 1912)

Synonyms
- Ophisma lacteicincta Hampson, 1912

= Artena lacteicincta =

Species of moth

Artena lacteicincta is a species of moth of the family Erebidae. It is found in the north-eastern part of the Himalaya, Thailand, Sumatra and Borneo.
