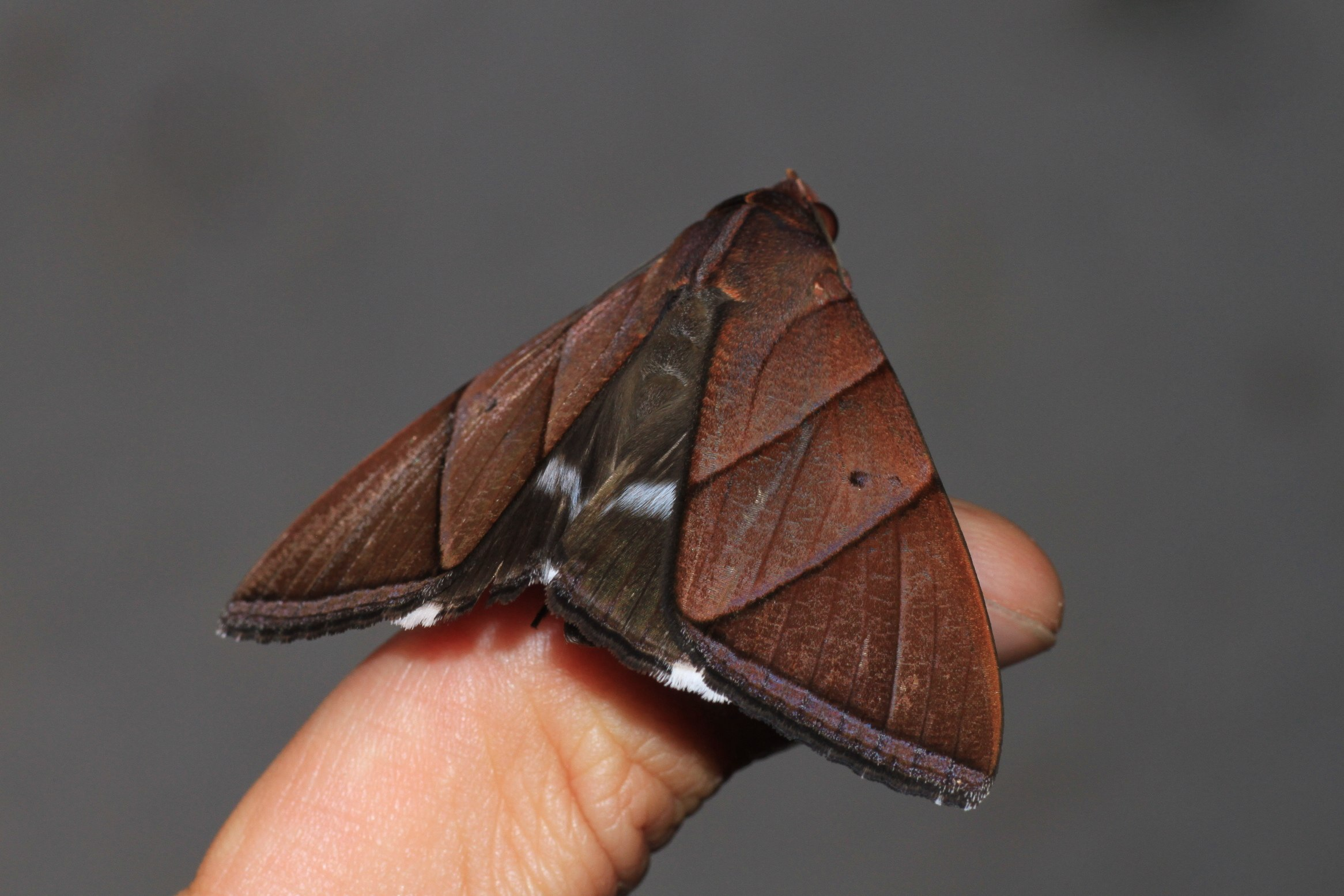
- Artena inversa

Scientific classification
- Kingdom: Animalia
- Phylum: Arthropoda
- Class: Insecta
- Order: Lepidoptera
- Superfamily: Noctuoidea
- Family: Erebidae
- Genus: Artena
- Species: A. inversa

Binomial name
- Artena inversa (Walker, 1858)

Synonyms
- Ophisma inversa Walker, 1858; Lagoptera bivirgata Snellen, 1885; Artena bivirgata

= Artena inversa =

Species of moth

Artena inversa is a species of moth of the family Erebidae. It is found on Borneo, north-eastern Sumatra and in the Philippines and Peninsular Malaysia.
