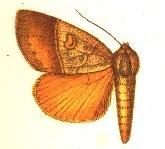

Scientific classification
- Kingdom: Animalia
- Phylum: Arthropoda
- Class: Insecta
- Order: Lepidoptera
- Superfamily: Noctuoidea
- Family: Erebidae
- Genus: Dermaleipa
- Species: D. minians

Binomial name
- Dermaleipa minians (Mabille, 1884)

Synonyms
- Ophiodes minians Mabille, 1884; Thyas minians (Mabille, 1884)

= Dermaleipa minians =

Species of moth

Dermaleipa minians is a species of moth in the family Erebidae first described by Paul Mabille in 1884. It is endemic to Madagascar.
