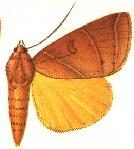

Scientific classification
- Kingdom: Animalia
- Phylum: Arthropoda
- Class: Insecta
- Order: Lepidoptera
- Superfamily: Noctuoidea
- Family: Erebidae
- Genus: Thyas
- Species: T. arcifera

Binomial name
- Thyas arcifera (Hampson, 1913)

Synonyms
- Dermaleipa arcifera

= Thyas arcifera =

Species of moth

Thyas arcifera is a moth of the family Noctuidae first described by George Hampson in 1913. It is found in eastern Africa, including South Africa.
