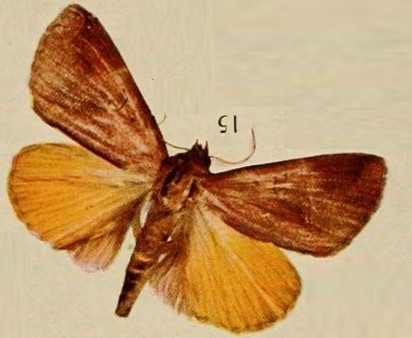

Scientific classification
- Kingdom: Animalia
- Phylum: Arthropoda
- Clade: Pancrustacea
- Class: Insecta
- Order: Lepidoptera
- Superfamily: Noctuoidea
- Family: Erebidae
- Genus: Thyas
- Species: T. nubilata

Binomial name
- Thyas nubilata (Holland, 1920)

Synonyms
- Dermaleipa nubilata Holland, 1920

= Thyas nubilata =

Species of moth

Thyas nubilata is a species of moth of the family Erebidae first described by William Jacob Holland in 1920. It is found in the Democratic Republic of the Congo.
