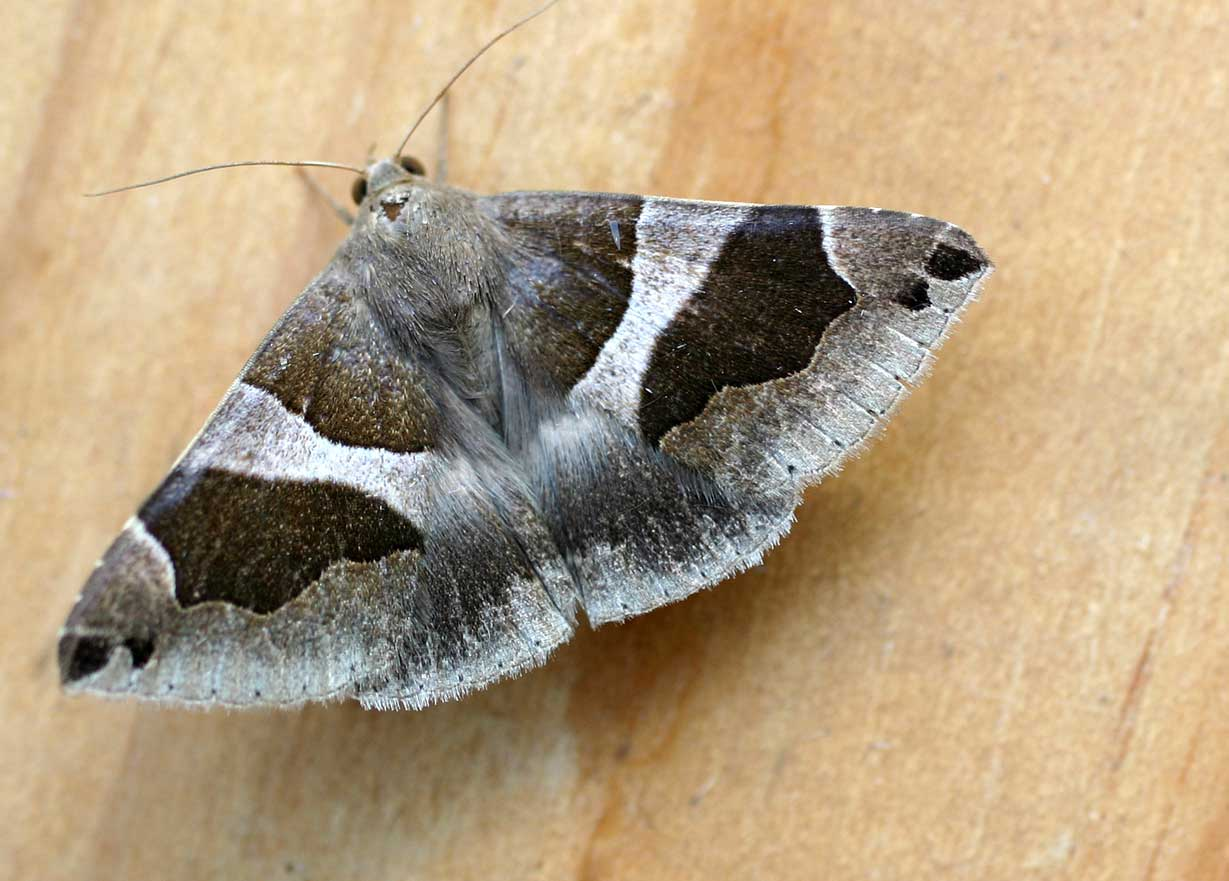
- Passenger, Dysgonia algira

Scientific classification
- Kingdom: Animalia
- Phylum: Arthropoda
- Class: Insecta
- Order: Lepidoptera
- Superfamily: Noctuoidea
- Family: Erebidae
- Subfamily: Erebinae
- Tribe: Ophiusini; Guenée, 1837

Synonyms
- Achaeini; Anuini; Cerocalini; Dermaleipini; Ophiusina; Pericymatini; Polydesmini

= Ophiusini =

Tribe of moths

The Ophiusini are a tribe of moths in the family Erebidae.

== Taxonomy ==
The tribe is one of the most successful of the major radiations of the subfamily Erebinae. The tribe was previously classified as the subtribe Ophiusina of the subfamily Catocalinae of the family Noctuidae. Phylogenetic studies have shown that the Ophiusini are closely related to the tribe Poaphilini, and both these tribes are best placed in the subfamily Erebinae of the family Erebidae. Many New World genera in the former Ophiusina were split into the tribe Omopterini after phylogenetic studies determined that the New and Old World genera were not as closely related to each other as they are to genera in other tribes of the Erebinae.

== Genera ==
The following genera are included in the tribe.

- Amphoraceras
- Artena
- Buzara
- Cerocala
- Clytie
- Dermaleipa (sometimes in Thyas)
- Dysgonia
- Euphiusa
- Grammodes
- Gnamptonyx
- Heteropalpia
- Lyncestis
- Minucia
- Ophiusa
- Prodotis (may belong in Grammodes)
- Rhabdophera
- Thyas
- Tabwecala
- Tytroca
