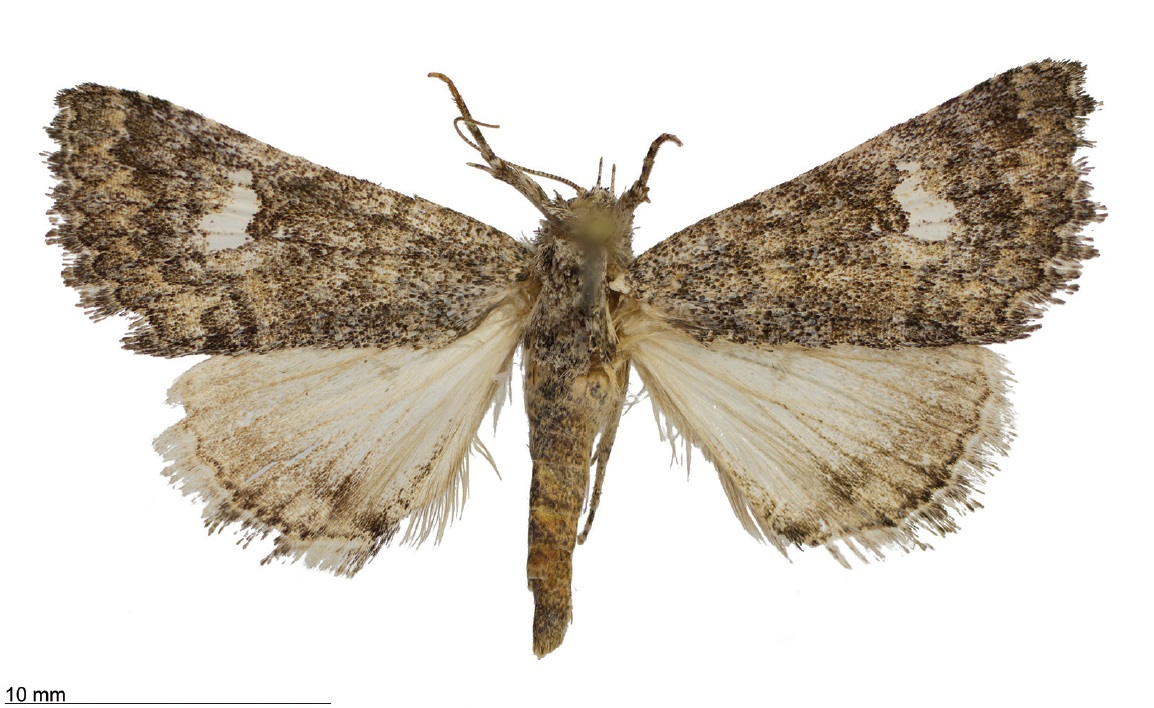
- Female
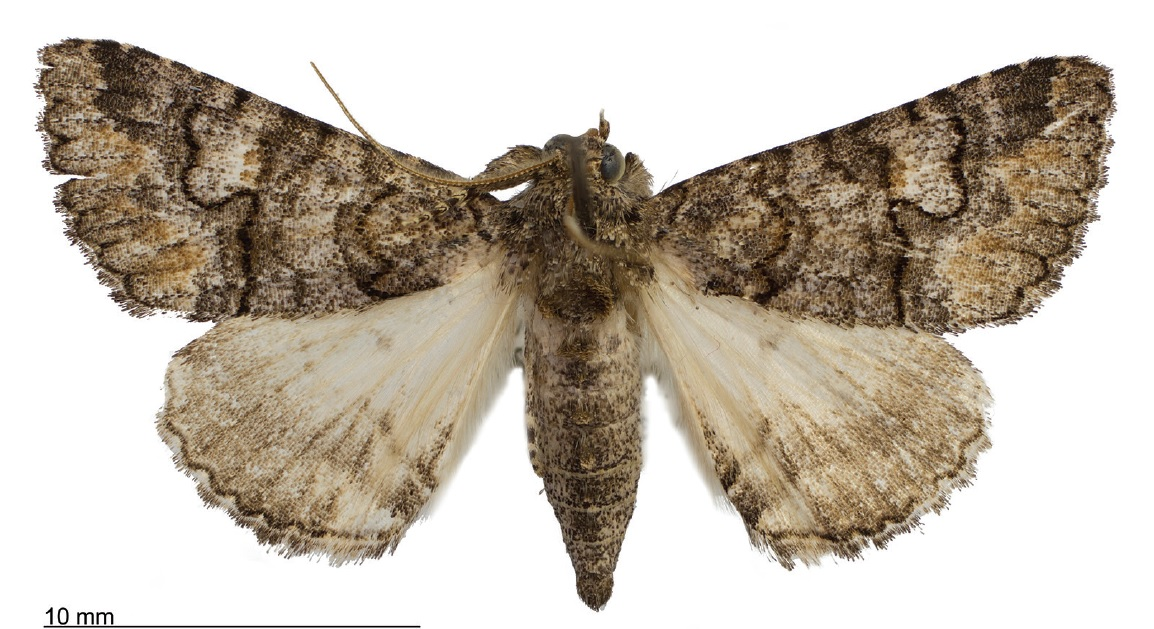
- Male

Scientific classification
- Kingdom: Animalia
- Phylum: Arthropoda
- Clade: Pancrustacea
- Class: Insecta
- Order: Lepidoptera
- Superfamily: Noctuoidea
- Family: Erebidae
- Genus: Heteranassa; J. B. Smith, 1899
- Species: H. mima

Binomial name
- Heteranassa mima (Harvey, 1876)

Synonyms
- Homoptera mima Harvey, 1876; Eubolina mima; Campometra mima; Elousa mima; Campometra fraterna Smith, 1899; Heteranassa fraterna; Elousa fraterna; Campometra minor Smith, 1899; Elousa minor; Heteranassa minor

= Heteranassa =

Genus of moths

Heteranassa is a monotypic genus of moths in the family Erebidae described by J. B. Smith in 1899. Its only species, Heteranassa mima, was first described by Leon F. Harvey in 1876. It is found in warm, arid habitats in North America from California to Texas, northward to Oklahoma, and south as far as Oaxaca in Mexico.

The length of the forewings is 9.7–14.9 mm for males and 11–16.7 mm for females. The antemedial line on the forewings is pointed apically on the anal vein and the medial line is black, pointed mesially on the radial, the cubital, and anal veins. The post medial line is black, outlining the apical half of the discal area and the subterminal line is brown, jagged, bordering the lighter colored terminal area. The terminal line is scalloped outwardly at the termini of the veins and the apical margin is traced in lighter coloration. The reniform spot markings range from a white spot, to a thin white vertical dash, to a barely visible dash, or black. The hindwing ground color is gray white, darker shading distally. The terminal line is black, scalloped apically at the termini of the veins. There are multiple generations per year, with adults on wing year round.

The larvae feed on Prosopis and Acacia species.

== Former species ==
- Heteranassa fraterna J. B. Smith, 1899 (syn: Heteranassa minor J. B. Smith, 1899)
