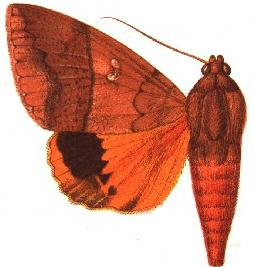

Scientific classification
- Kingdom: Animalia
- Phylum: Arthropoda
- Class: Insecta
- Order: Lepidoptera
- Superfamily: Noctuoidea
- Family: Erebidae
- Genus: Thyas
- Species: T. miniacea

Binomial name
- Thyas miniacea (Felder & Rogenhofer, 1874)

Synonyms
- Lagoptera miniacea Felder & Rogenhofer, 1874; Thyas regia Lucas, 1894; Lagoptera regina Strand, 1914; Thyas rubrior Holloway, 1979

= Thyas miniacea =

Species of moth

Thyas miniacea is a species of moth of the family Noctuidae. It is found from the Moluccas and Lesser Sundas to northern Australia, Fiji, Samoa, New Caledonia and Micronesia (Marianas, Carolines).

The larvae feed on Quisqualis and Terminalia species.

== Gallery ==
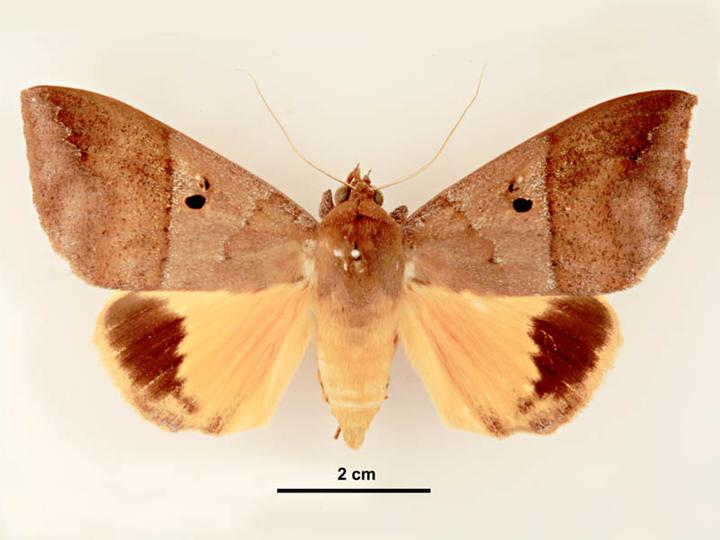
Female, dorsal view

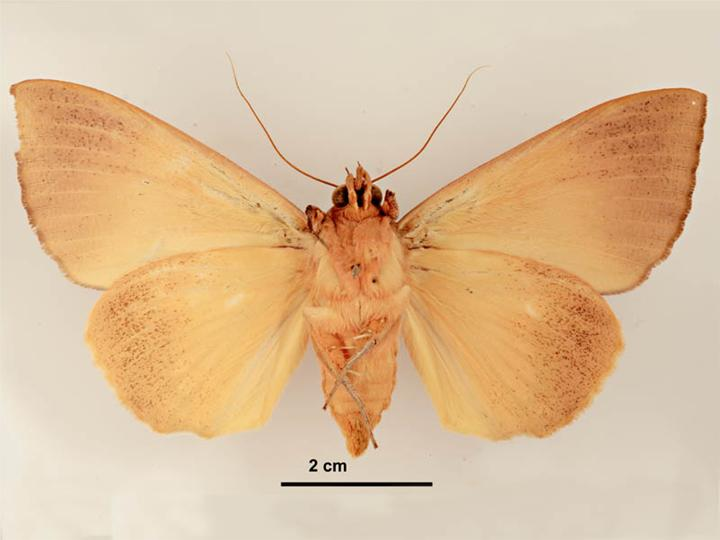
Female, ventral view

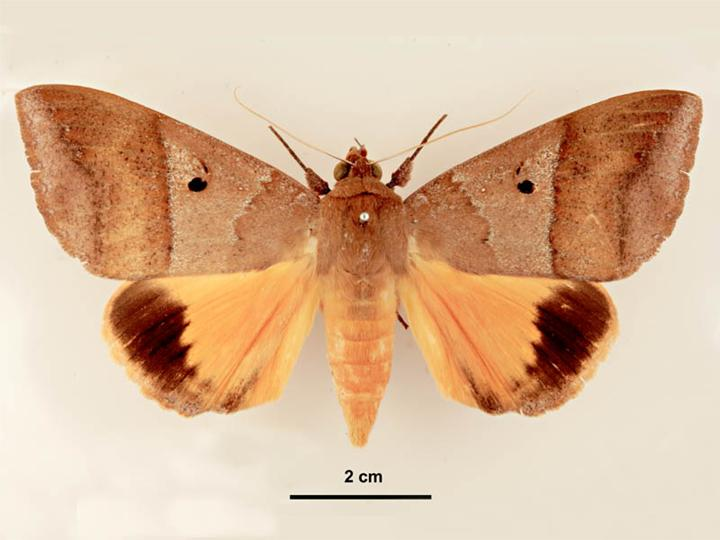
Male, dorsal view

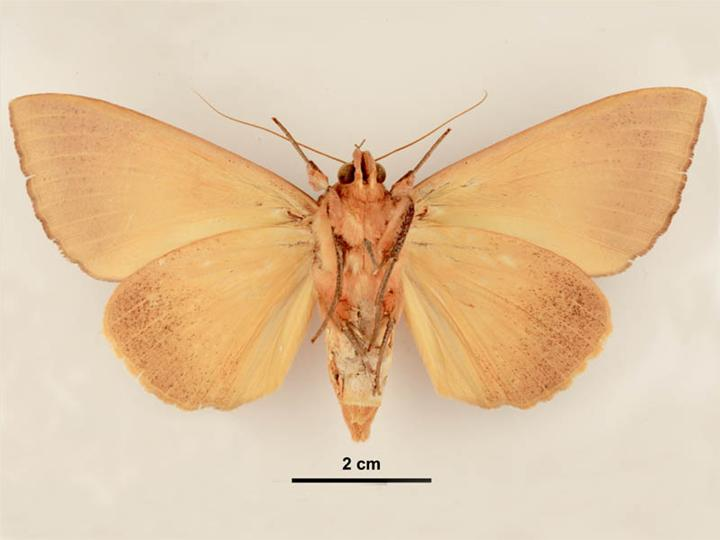
Male, ventral view
