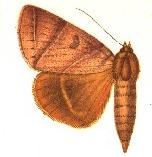

Scientific classification
- Kingdom: Animalia
- Phylum: Arthropoda
- Class: Insecta
- Order: Lepidoptera
- Superfamily: Noctuoidea
- Family: Erebidae
- Genus: Thyas
- Species: T. metaphaea

Binomial name
- Thyas metaphaea (Hampson, 1913)

Synonyms
- Dermaleipa metaphaea

= Thyas metaphaea =

Species of moth

Thyas metaphaea is a moth of the family Noctuidae first described by George Hampson in 1913. It is found in Africa, including Nigeria.
