= Zale =

Zale or Zales may refer to:

== Places ==
- Żałe, Kuyavian-Pomeranian Voivodeship, north-central Poland
- Żale, Podlaskie Voivodeship, north-east Poland
- Żale, Greater Poland Voivodeship, west-central Poland
- Zaleś, Siedlce County, Masovian Voivodeship, east-central Poland
- Zaleś, Sokołów County, Masovian Voivodeship, east-central Poland

== People ==
- Kārlis Zāle (1888–1942), Latvian sculptor
- Tony Zale (1913–1997), American boxer
- Zale Dalen (born 1947), Canadian film and television director
- Zales Ecton (1898–1961), American politician
- Zale Parry (born 1933), American scuba diver and photographer

=== Fictional characters ===
- Mackenzie Zales, the protagonist of the web series The Most Popular Girls in School
- Zelmo Zale, a fictional character on the TV series M*A*S*H
- Zale, a fictional priest in the 2018 novel Swordheart

== Other uses ==
- Zales, an American retail jewelry chain
- Zale (band), a Romanian hip-hop group
- Zale (moth), a genus of noctuid moths
  - Zale intenta, a type of moth native to Nova Scotia
  - Zale metatoides, a type of moth found in Wisconsin
  - Zale minerea, a type of owlet moth
- Žale, a cemetery in Ljubljana, Slovenia

== See also ==
- Zahle, a city in Lebanon
- Zael (disambiguation)
