= Toxonprucha pardalis =

Scientific classification
- Domain: Eukaryota
- Kingdom: Animalia
- Phylum: Arthropoda
- Class: Insecta
- Order: Lepidoptera
- Superfamily: Noctuoidea
- Family: Erebidae
- Tribe: Omopterini
- Genus: Toxonprucha
- Species: T. pardalis

Binomial name
- Toxonprucha pardalis (Smith, 1908)

Species of moth

Toxonprucha pardalis, the spotted toxonprucha, is a species of moth in the family Erebidae. It is found in North America.

The MONA or Hodges number for Toxonprucha pardalis is 8670.
