= Zale obsita =

Scientific classification
- Kingdom: Animalia
- Phylum: Arthropoda
- Clade: Pancrustacea
- Class: Insecta
- Order: Lepidoptera
- Superfamily: Noctuoidea
- Family: Erebidae
- Subfamily: Erebinae
- Tribe: Omopterini
- Genus: Zale
- Species: Z. obsita

Binomial name
- Zale obsita (Guenée, 1852)

Species of moth

Zale obsita is a species of moth in the family Erebidae. It was described by Achille Guenée in 1852 and is found in North America.

The MONA or Hodges number for Zale obsita is 8686.1.
