= Zale strigimacula =

Scientific classification
- Kingdom: Animalia
- Phylum: Arthropoda
- Class: Insecta
- Order: Lepidoptera
- Superfamily: Noctuoidea
- Family: Erebidae
- Tribe: Omopterini
- Genus: Zale
- Species: Z. strigimacula

Binomial name
- Zale strigimacula (Guenée, 1852)

Species of moth

Zale strigimacula is a species of moth in the family Erebidae. It is found in North America.

The MONA or Hodges number for Zale strigimacula is 8686.
