= Toxonprucha strigalis =

Scientific classification
- Domain: Eukaryota
- Kingdom: Animalia
- Phylum: Arthropoda
- Class: Insecta
- Order: Lepidoptera
- Superfamily: Noctuoidea
- Family: Erebidae
- Tribe: Omopterini
- Genus: Toxonprucha
- Species: T. strigalis

Binomial name
- Toxonprucha strigalis (Smith, 1903)

Species of moth

Toxonprucha strigalis is a species of moth in the family Erebidae. It is found in North America.

The MONA or Hodges number for Toxonprucha strigalis is 8671.
