= Zale peruncta =

Scientific classification
- Kingdom: Animalia
- Phylum: Arthropoda
- Class: Insecta
- Order: Lepidoptera
- Superfamily: Noctuoidea
- Family: Erebidae
- Tribe: Omopterini
- Genus: Zale
- Species: Z. peruncta

Binomial name
- Zale peruncta (Guenée, 1852)

Species of moth

Zale peruncta is a species of moth in the family Erebidae. It is found in North America.

The MONA or Hodges number for Zale peruncta is 8684.1.

== Subspecies ==
These two subspecies belong to the species Zale peruncta:

- Zale peruncta incipiens Walker, 1858
- Zale peruncta peruncta
