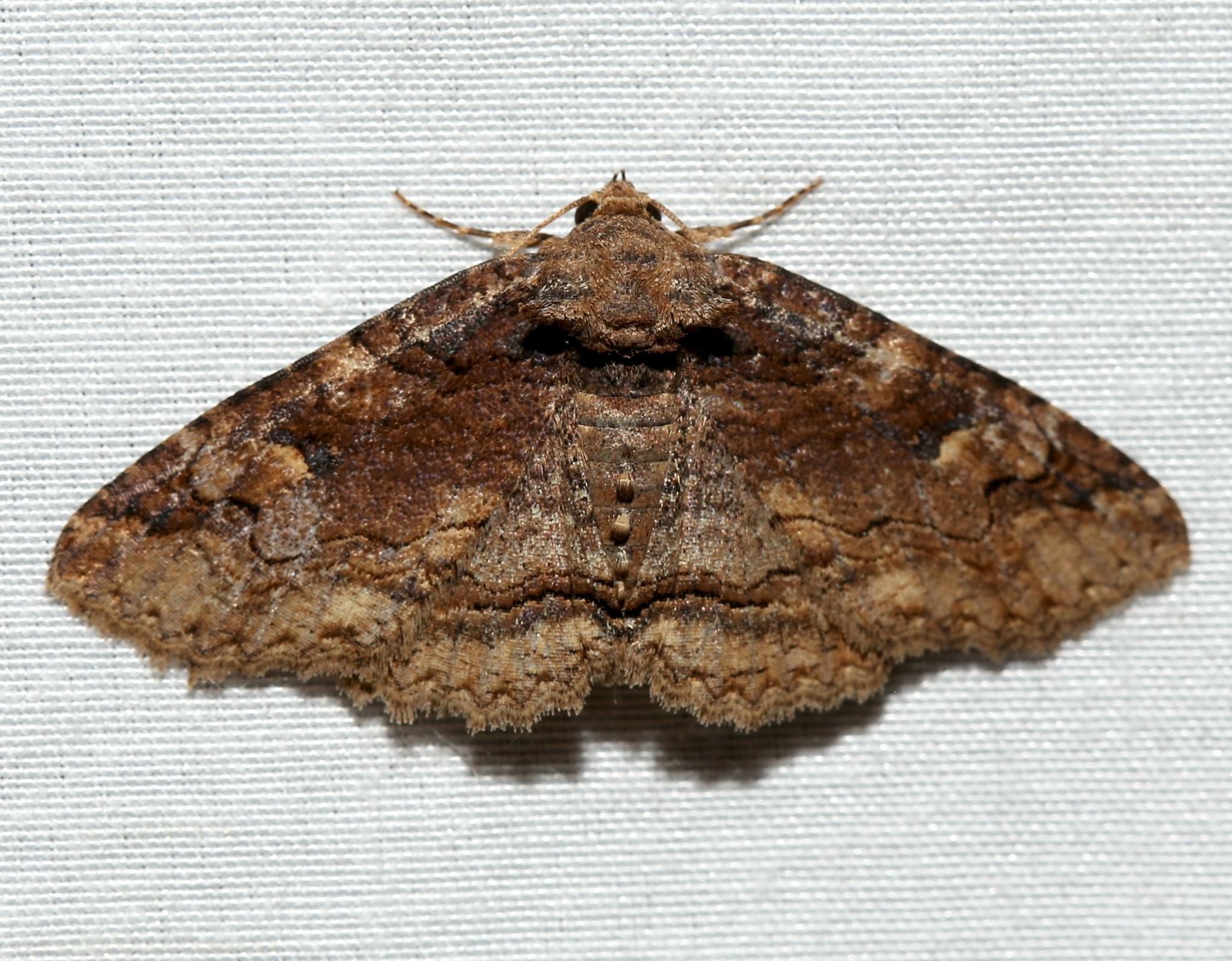

Scientific classification
- Kingdom: Animalia
- Phylum: Arthropoda
- Clade: Pancrustacea
- Class: Insecta
- Order: Lepidoptera
- Superfamily: Noctuoidea
- Family: Erebidae
- Tribe: Omopterini
- Genus: Zale
- Species: Z. phaeocapna

Binomial name
- Zale phaeocapna Franclemont, 1950

= Zale phaeocapna =

Species of moth

Zale phaeocapna is a species of moth in the family Erebidae. It is found in North America.
