= Zale colorado =

Scientific classification
- Domain: Eukaryota
- Kingdom: Animalia
- Phylum: Arthropoda
- Class: Insecta
- Order: Lepidoptera
- Superfamily: Noctuoidea
- Family: Erebidae
- Tribe: Omopterini
- Genus: Zale
- Species: Z. colorado

Binomial name
- Zale colorado (Smith, 1908)

Species of moth

Zale colorado is a species of moth in the family Erebidae. It is found in North America.

The MONA or Hodges number for Zale colorado is 8715.
