= Zale fictilis =

Scientific classification
- Kingdom: Animalia
- Phylum: Arthropoda
- Class: Insecta
- Order: Lepidoptera
- Superfamily: Noctuoidea
- Family: Erebidae
- Tribe: Omopterini
- Genus: Zale
- Species: Z. fictilis

Binomial name
- Zale fictilis (Guenée, 1852)

Species of moth

Zale fictilis, the fictilis zale moth, is a species of moth in the family Erebidae. It is found in North America.

The MONA or Hodges number for Zale fictilis is 8687.
