= Zale bethunei =

Scientific classification
- Kingdom: Animalia
- Phylum: Arthropoda
- Clade: Pancrustacea
- Class: Insecta
- Order: Lepidoptera
- Superfamily: Noctuoidea
- Family: Erebidae
- Tribe: Omopterini
- Genus: Zale
- Species: Z. bethunei

Binomial name
- Zale bethunei (Smith, 1908)

Species of moth

Zale bethunei, or Bethune's zale, is a species of moth in the family Erebidae first described by Smith in 1908. It is found in North America.

The Moths of North America (MONA) (a.k.a. Hodges number) for Zale bethunei is 8705.
