= Zale rubiata =

Scientific classification
- Domain: Eukaryota
- Kingdom: Animalia
- Phylum: Arthropoda
- Class: Insecta
- Order: Lepidoptera
- Superfamily: Noctuoidea
- Family: Erebidae
- Tribe: Omopterini
- Genus: Zale
- Species: Z. rubiata

Binomial name
- Zale rubiata (Smith, 1908)

Species of moth

Zale rubiata is a species of moth in the family Erebidae. It is found in North America.

The MONA or Hodges number for Zale rubiata is 8710.
