= Zale rubi =

Scientific classification
- Kingdom: Animalia
- Phylum: Arthropoda
- Clade: Pancrustacea
- Class: Insecta
- Order: Lepidoptera
- Superfamily: Noctuoidea
- Family: Erebidae
- Tribe: Omopterini
- Genus: Zale
- Species: Z. rubi

Binomial name
- Zale rubi (H. Edwards, 1881)

Species of moth

Zale rubi is a species of moth in the family Erebidae. It is found in North America.

The MONA or Hodges number for Zale rubi is 8711.
