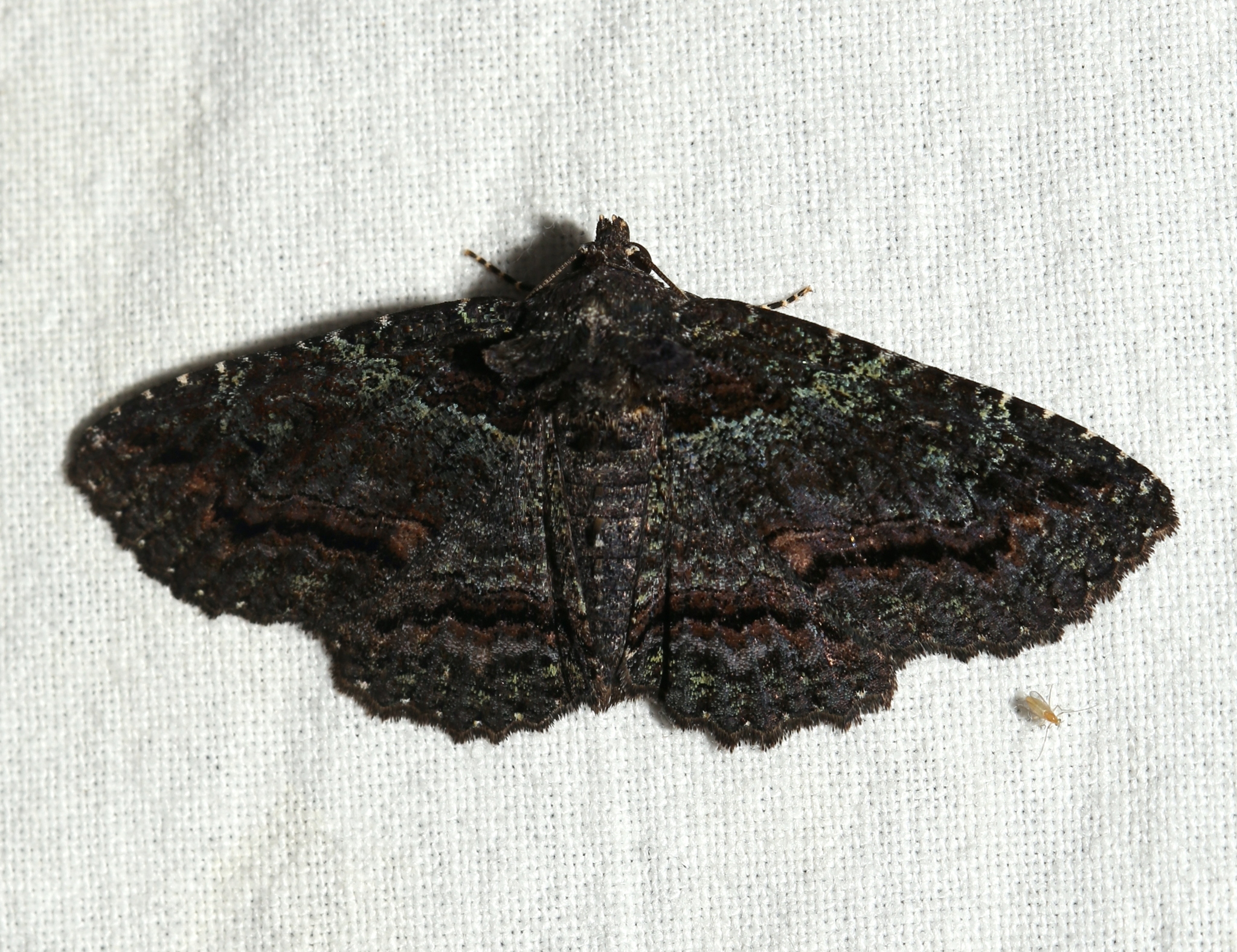

Scientific classification
- Kingdom: Animalia
- Phylum: Arthropoda
- Class: Insecta
- Order: Lepidoptera
- Superfamily: Noctuoidea
- Family: Erebidae
- Tribe: Omopterini
- Genus: Zale
- Species: Z. aeruginosa

Binomial name
- Zale aeruginosa (Guenée, 1852)

= Zale aeruginosa =

Species of moth

Zale aeruginosa, the green-dusted zale, is a species of moth in the family Erebidae. It is found in North America.

The MONA or Hodges number for Zale aeruginosa is 8694.
