= Acritogramma metaleuca =

Scientific classification
- Kingdom: Animalia
- Phylum: Arthropoda
- Class: Insecta
- Order: Lepidoptera
- Superfamily: Noctuoidea
- Family: Erebidae
- Tribe: Omopterini
- Genus: Acritogramma
- Species: A. metaleuca

Binomial name
- Acritogramma metaleuca (Hampson, 1913)

Species of moth

Acritogramma metaleuca is a moth species in the family Erebidae. It is found in North America.

The MONA or Hodges number for Acritogramma metaleuca is 8682.
