= Zale chisosensis =

Scientific classification
- Domain: Eukaryota
- Kingdom: Animalia
- Phylum: Arthropoda
- Class: Insecta
- Order: Lepidoptera
- Superfamily: Noctuoidea
- Family: Erebidae
- Tribe: Omopterini
- Genus: Zale
- Species: Z. chisosensis

Binomial name
- Zale chisosensis A. Blanchard & Franclemont, 1982

Species of moth

Zale chisosensis is a species of moth in the family Erebidae. It is found in North America.

The MONA or Hodges number for Zale chisosensis is 8693.1.
