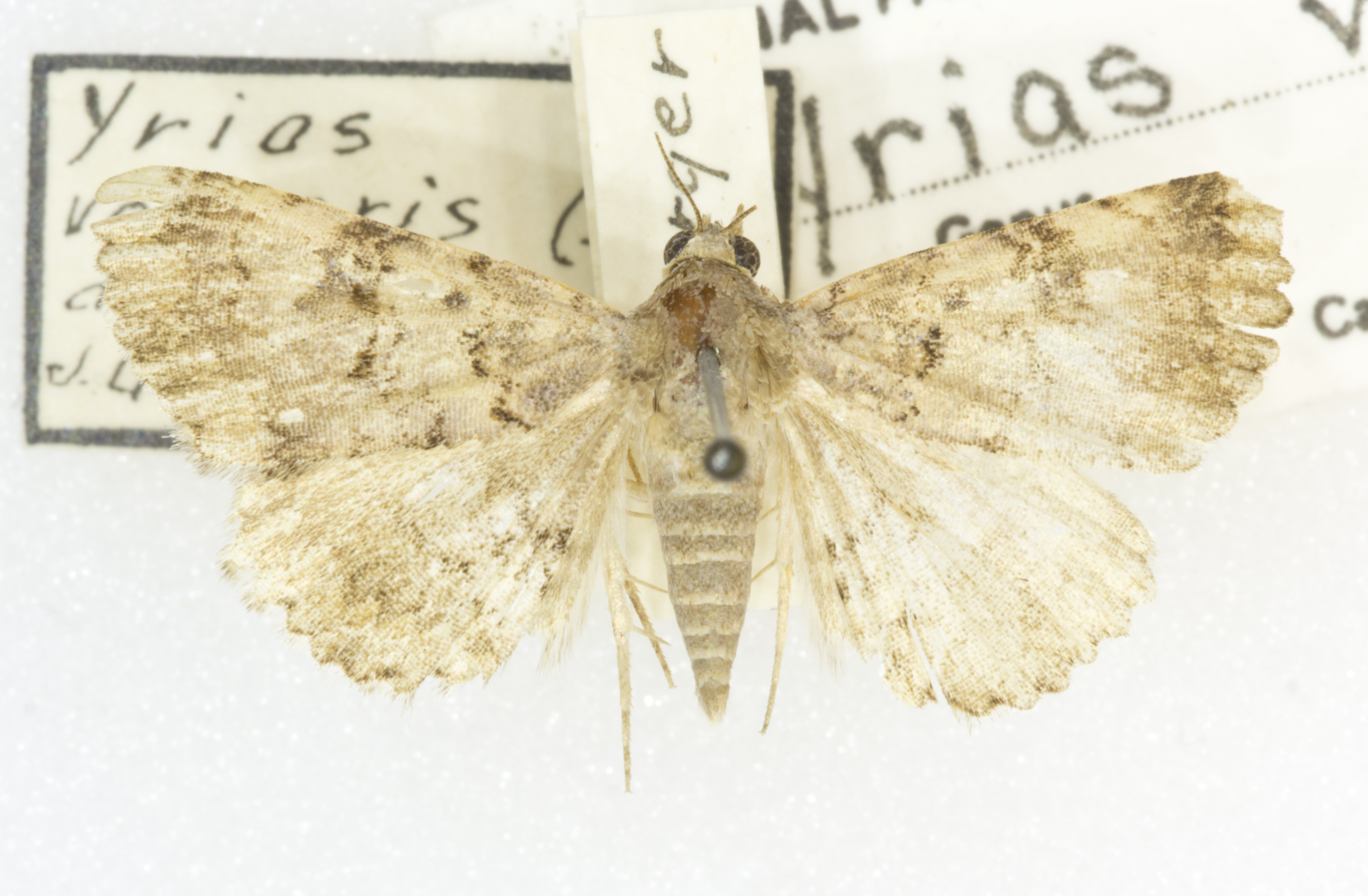

Scientific classification
- Kingdom: Animalia
- Phylum: Arthropoda
- Class: Insecta
- Order: Lepidoptera
- Superfamily: Noctuoidea
- Family: Erebidae
- Genus: Toxonprucha
- Species: T. volucris

Binomial name
- Toxonprucha volucris (Grote, 1883)

= Toxonprucha volucris =

Species of moth

Toxonprucha volucris, the bird toxonprucha, is a species of moth in the family Erebidae. It is found in North America.
