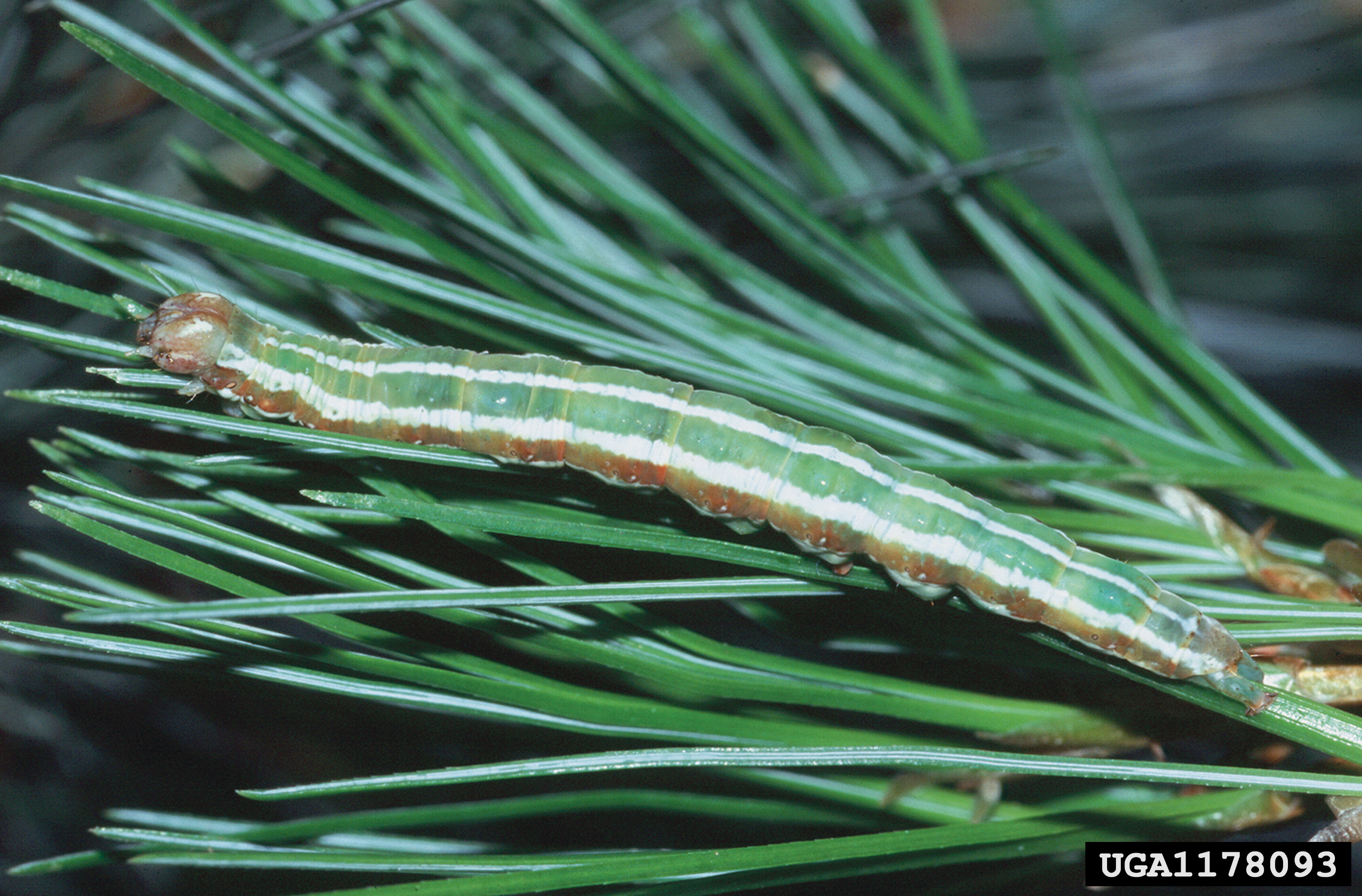
- Northern variant

Scientific classification
- Domain: Eukaryota
- Kingdom: Animalia
- Phylum: Arthropoda
- Class: Insecta
- Order: Lepidoptera
- Superfamily: Noctuoidea
- Family: Erebidae
- Genus: Zale
- Species: Z. helata

Binomial name
- Zale helata McDunnough, 1943

Synonyms
- Zale ruperti McDunnough, 1943 (form)

= Zale helata =

Species of moth

Zale helata, the brown-spotted zale, is a moth of the family Noctuidae. The species was first described by James Halliday McDunnough in 1943. It is found in barrens and pine woodlands from Manitoba to Maine, south to northern Alabama and Texas.

The wingspan is 35–41 mm. Adults are on wing from May to June. There is one generation per year.
