= Zale submediana =

Scientific classification
- Domain: Eukaryota
- Kingdom: Animalia
- Phylum: Arthropoda
- Class: Insecta
- Order: Lepidoptera
- Superfamily: Noctuoidea
- Family: Erebidae
- Genus: Zale
- Species: Z. submediana

Binomial name
- Zale submediana Strand, 1917

Synonyms
- Zale lemmeri McDunnough, 1943 (form)

Species of moth

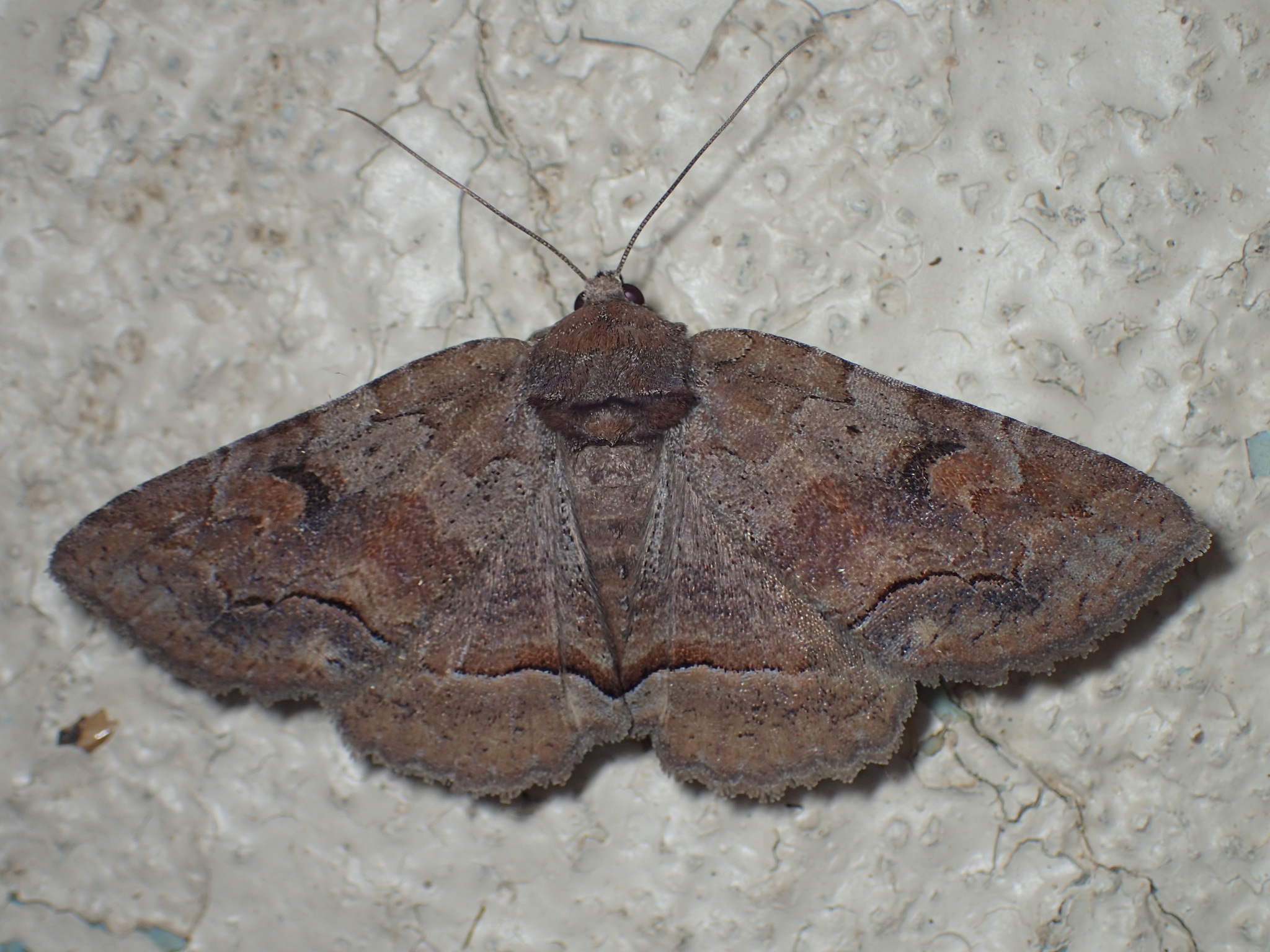
Zale submediana (Gray Spring Zale Moth) at Tuscaloosa, Alabama, USA.

Zale submediana, the gray spring zale, is a moth of the family Noctuidae. The species was first described by Embrik Strand in 1917. It is found in the US from Wisconsin to Maine, south to New Jersey and in mountains to North Carolina.

The wingspan is about 39 mm. There is one generation over much of range. The species is listed as being of special concern and is believed to be extirpated from Connecticut.
