= Acritogramma =

Scientific classification
- Domain: Eukaryota
- Kingdom: Animalia
- Phylum: Arthropoda
- Class: Insecta
- Order: Lepidoptera
- Superfamily: Noctuoidea
- Family: Erebidae
- Tribe: Omopterini
- Genus: Acritogramma; Franclemont, 1986

Genus of moths

Acritogramma is a genus of moths in the family Erebidae.

== Species ==
- Acritogramma metaleuca (Hampson, 1913)
- Acritogramma noctar (Schaus, 1901)
