= Zale obliqua =

Scientific classification
- Kingdom: Animalia
- Phylum: Arthropoda
- Class: Insecta
- Order: Lepidoptera
- Superfamily: Noctuoidea
- Family: Erebidae
- Genus: Zale
- Species: Z. obliqua

Binomial name
- Zale obliqua (Guenée, 1852)

Species of moth

Zale obliqua, the oblique zale, is a moth of the family Noctuidae. The species was first described by Achille Guenée in 1852. It is found in barrens and pine woodlands of the United States from Ohio to southern Maine, south to northern Florida, Mississippi and Texas.

Zale obliqua has a less contrasting pattern and no bluish gray band. The wingspan is 36–40 mm. Adults are on wing in late March in southeastern North Carolina and in early summer from New Jersey northward. There is one generation from New Jersey north. From eastern Maryland to northeastern North Carolina southward there are two generations.

They feed on pitch pine in the north and probably loblolly, pond, and longleaf pine in the south.
