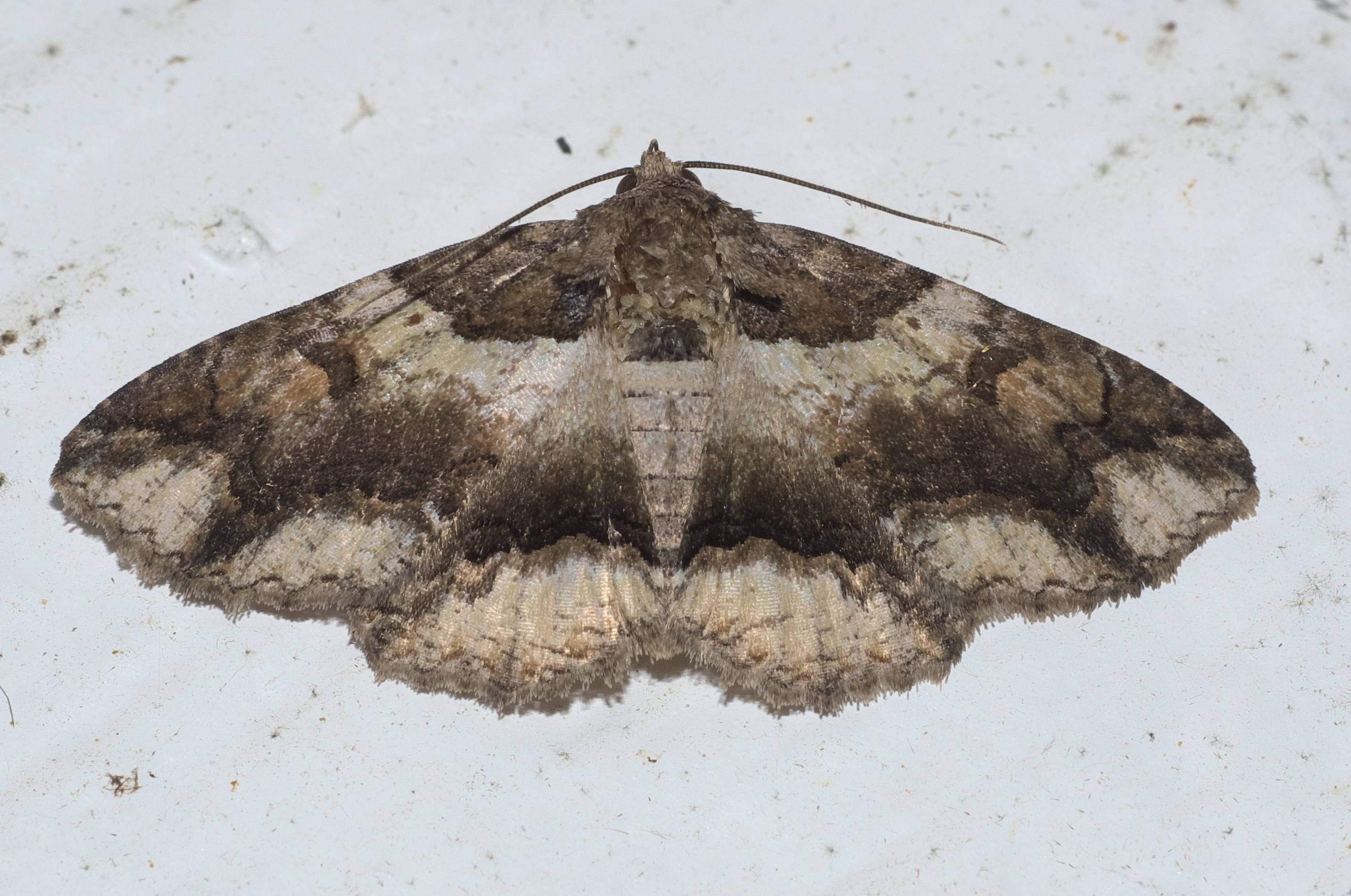

Scientific classification
- Kingdom: Animalia
- Phylum: Arthropoda
- Clade: Pancrustacea
- Class: Insecta
- Order: Lepidoptera
- Superfamily: Noctuoidea
- Family: Erebidae
- Genus: Zale
- Species: Z. galbanata

Binomial name
- Zale galbanata (Morrison, 1876)

= Zale galbanata =

Species of moth

Zale galbanata, the maple zale, is a species of moth in the family Erebidae. It is found in North America.
