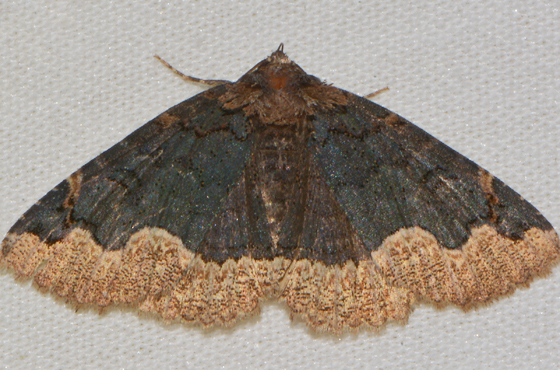

Scientific classification
- Kingdom: Animalia
- Phylum: Arthropoda
- Clade: Pancrustacea
- Class: Insecta
- Order: Lepidoptera
- Superfamily: Noctuoidea
- Family: Erebidae
- Genus: Zale
- Species: Z. horrida

Binomial name
- Zale horrida Hübner, 1819

= Zale horrida =

Species of moth

Zale horrida, the horrid zale, is a species of moth in the family Erebidae. The species was first described by Jacob Hübner in 1819. It is found in North America.

The MONA or Hodges number for Zale horrida is 8717.

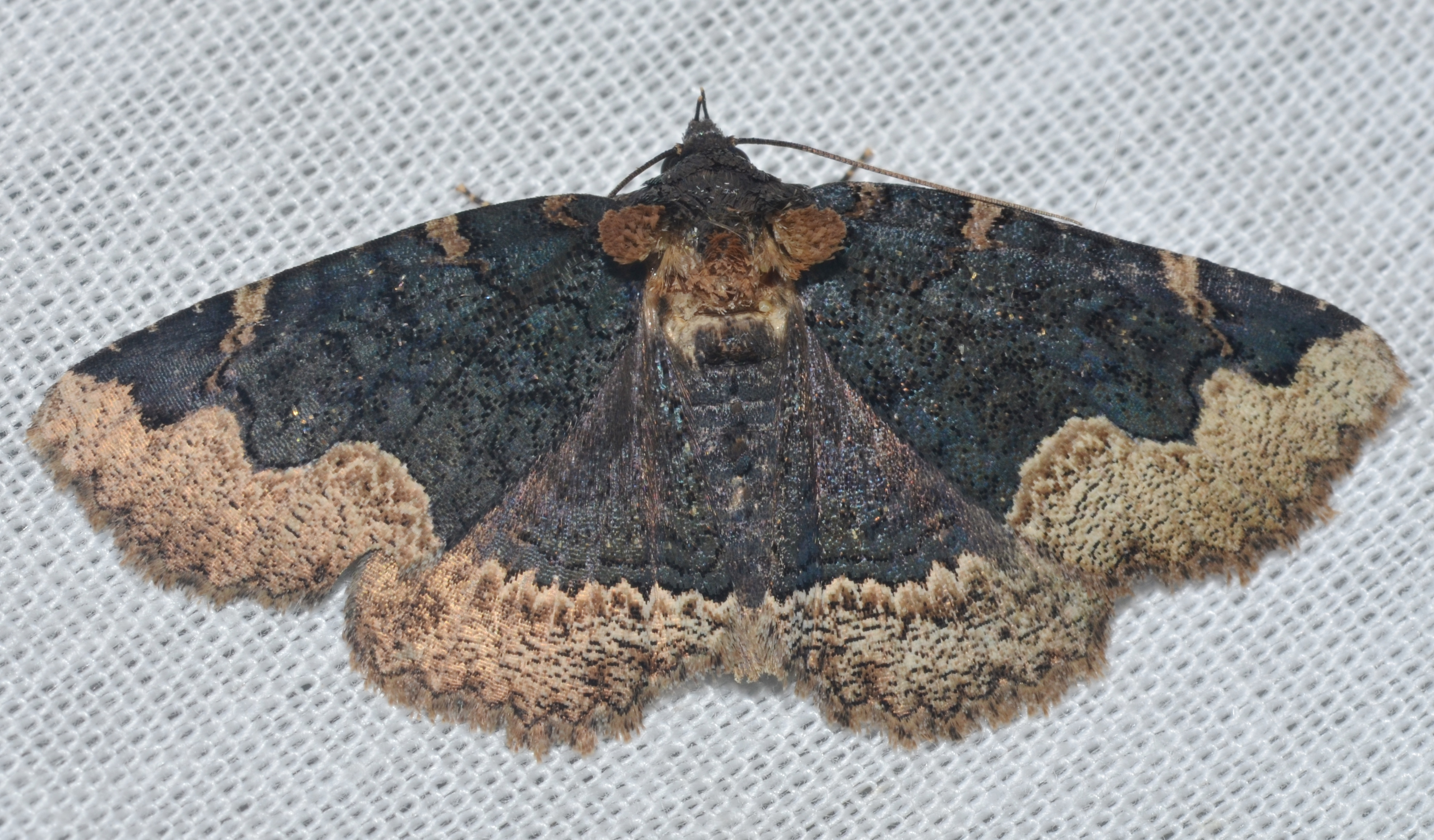
Horrid zale, Zale horrida
