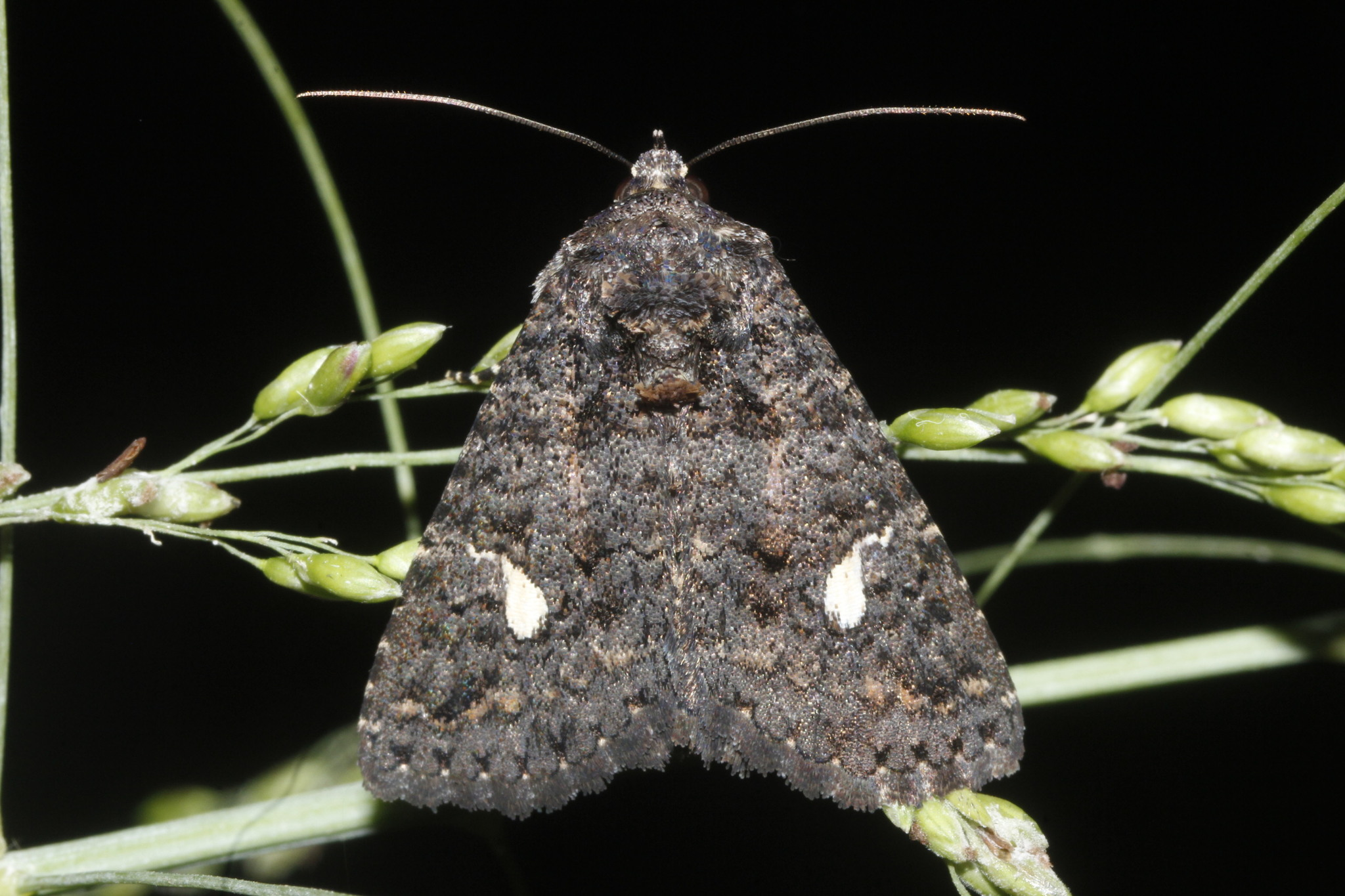
- Coxina cinctipalpis, México

Scientific classification
- Kingdom: Animalia
- Phylum: Arthropoda
- Class: Insecta
- Order: Lepidoptera
- Superfamily: Noctuoidea
- Family: Erebidae
- Subfamily: Erebinae
- Tribe: Omopterini
- Genus: Coxina; Guenée, 1852

= Coxina =

Genus of moths

Coxina is a genus of moths in the family Erebidae, found in North, Central, and South America.

== Species ==
These eight species belong to the genus Coxina:

- Coxina cinctipalpis (Smith, 1899) (black-waved owlet) (Mexico, southern United States)
- Coxina cymograpta Dognin, 1914 (Argentina)
- Coxina ensipalpis Guenée, 1852 (Mexico, Central America)
- Coxina guinocha Schaus, 1933 (Argentina)
- Coxina hadenoides Guenee, 1852 (Mexico, Central America)
- Coxina plumbeola Hampson, 1926 (Caribbean)
- Coxina thermeola Hampson, 1926 (Central America)
- Coxina turibia Schaus, 1934 (Argentina)
