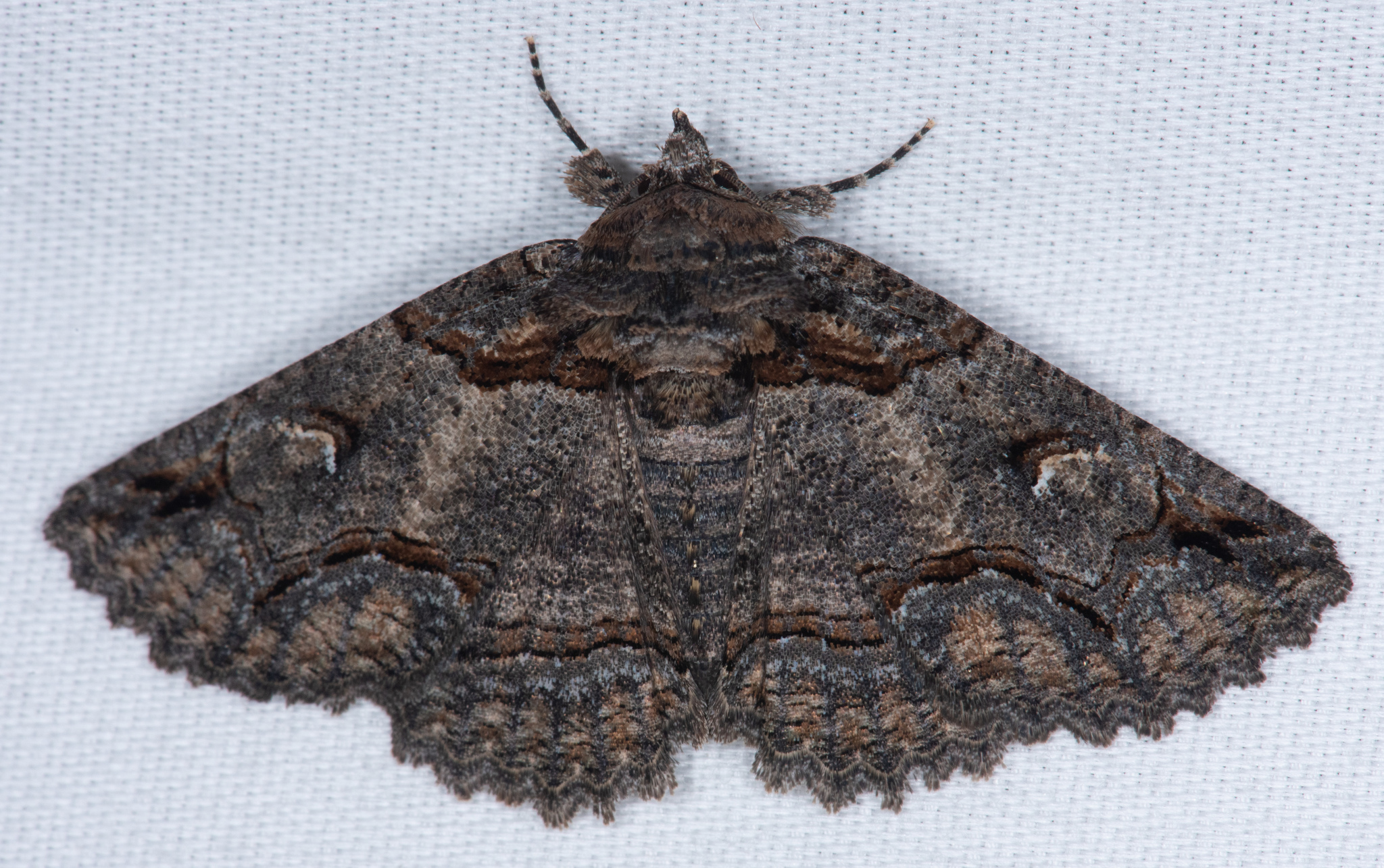

Scientific classification
- Domain: Eukaryota
- Kingdom: Animalia
- Phylum: Arthropoda
- Class: Insecta
- Order: Lepidoptera
- Superfamily: Noctuoidea
- Family: Erebidae
- Genus: Zale
- Species: Z. termina

Binomial name
- Zale termina (Grote, 1883)

= Zale termina =

Species of moth

Zale termina is a species of moth in the family Erebidae. It is found in North America.
