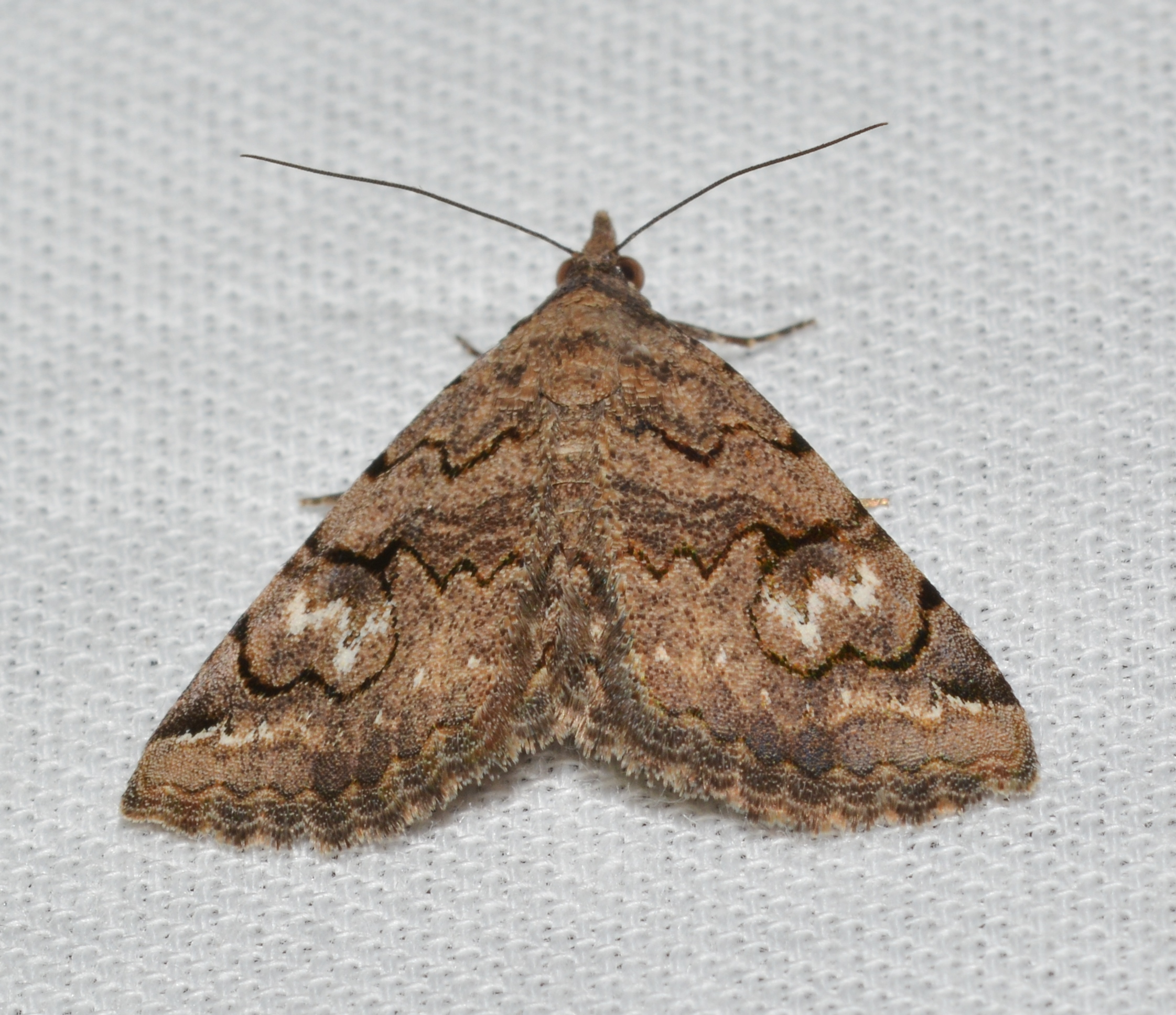

Scientific classification
- Domain: Eukaryota
- Kingdom: Animalia
- Phylum: Arthropoda
- Class: Insecta
- Order: Lepidoptera
- Superfamily: Noctuoidea
- Family: Erebidae
- Genus: Toxonprucha
- Species: T. repentis

Binomial name
- Toxonprucha repentis (Grote, 1881)

= Toxonprucha repentis =

Species of moth

Toxonprucha repentis is a species of moth in the family Erebidae first described by Augustus Radcliffe Grote in 1881. It is found in North America.

The MONA or Hodges number for Toxonprucha repentis is 8673.
