= Coxina hadenoides =

Scientific classification
- Kingdom: Animalia
- Phylum: Arthropoda
- Clade: Pancrustacea
- Class: Insecta
- Order: Lepidoptera
- Superfamily: Noctuoidea
- Family: Erebidae
- Genus: Coxina
- Species: C. hadenoides

Binomial name
- Coxina hadenoides Guenée, 1852

Species of moth

Coxina hadenoides is a species of moth in the family Erebidae. It is found in North America.

The MONA or Hodges number for Coxina hadenoides is 8662.1.
