= Zale buchholzi =

Buchholz's zale

Scientific classification
- Kingdom: Animalia
- Phylum: Arthropoda
- Clade: Pancrustacea
- Class: Insecta
- Order: Lepidoptera
- Superfamily: Noctuoidea
- Family: Erebidae
- Genus: Zale
- Species: Z. buchholzi

Binomial name
- Zale buchholzi McDunnough, 1943

Species of moth

Zale buchholzi, or Buchholz's zale, is a moth of the family Erebidae. The species was first described by James Halliday McDunnough in 1943. It is found in coastal pinelands of the Atlantic coastal plain from New Jersey to Florida, west along the Gulf Coast to Texas.

There is one generation per year.

The larvae feed on pitch pine and pond pine in New Jersey. Larvae have also been recorded on loblolly and longleaf pine in the south.
