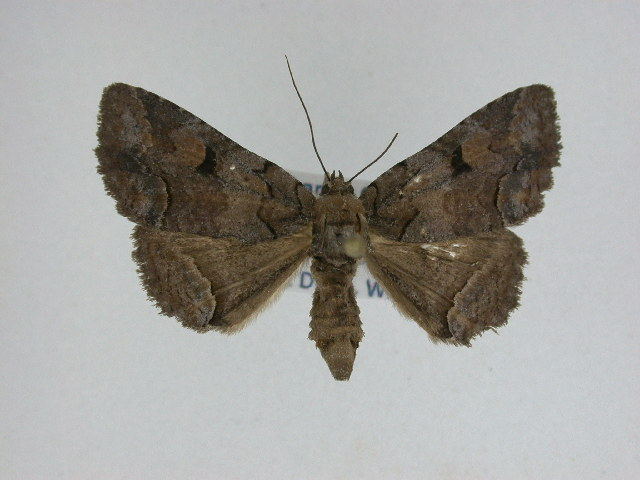

Conservation status
- Apparently Secure (NatureServe)

Scientific classification
- Kingdom: Animalia
- Phylum: Arthropoda
- Class: Insecta
- Order: Lepidoptera
- Superfamily: Noctuoidea
- Family: Erebidae
- Genus: Zale
- Species: Z. curema

Binomial name
- Zale curema (J. B. Smith, 1908)

Synonyms
- Phaeocyma curema Smith, 1908

= Zale curema =

Species of moth

Zale curema, the black-eyed zale moth, black-eyed zale or northeastern pine zale, is a moth of the family Erebidae. The species was first described by John Bernhard Smith in 1908. It is found in forests and woodlands in the eastern United States and Canada. The species is listed as endangered in Connecticut, but is classified as "apparently secure" globally.

The wingspan is up to about 35 mm. There is one generation per year. The larvae feed on pitch pine. They prefer young needles.
