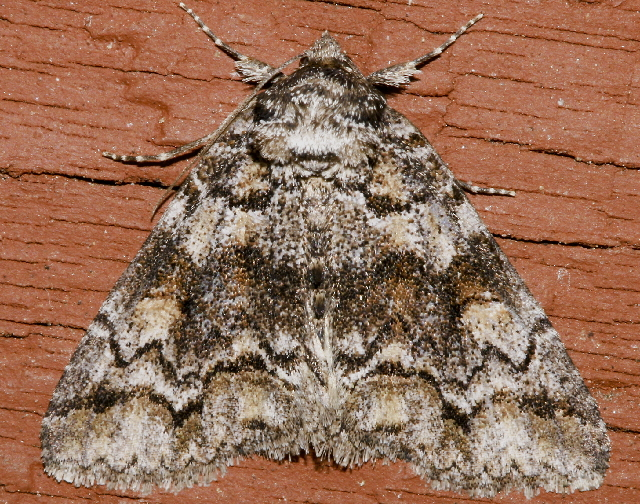

Scientific classification
- Domain: Eukaryota
- Kingdom: Animalia
- Phylum: Arthropoda
- Class: Insecta
- Order: Lepidoptera
- Superfamily: Noctuoidea
- Family: Erebidae
- Genus: Zale
- Species: Z. duplicata

Binomial name
- Zale duplicata (Bethune, 1865)

Synonyms
- Zale benesignata (Harvey, 1875) (form); Zale franclemonti McDunnough, 1943 (form)

= Zale duplicata =

Species of moth

Zale duplicata, the pine false looper zale, pine false looper, banded similar-wing or grey similar-wing, is a moth of the family Noctuidae. The species was first described by Charles J. S. Bethune in 1865. It is found in woodlands and forests from British Columbia to Nova Scotia, south to the mountains of Georgia and Texas.

The wingspan is 34–36 mm. Adults are on wing from late May to June in Alberta. There is one generation per year.

== Subspecies ==
- Zale duplicata duplicata
- Zale duplicata largera (J. B. Smith, 1908)
