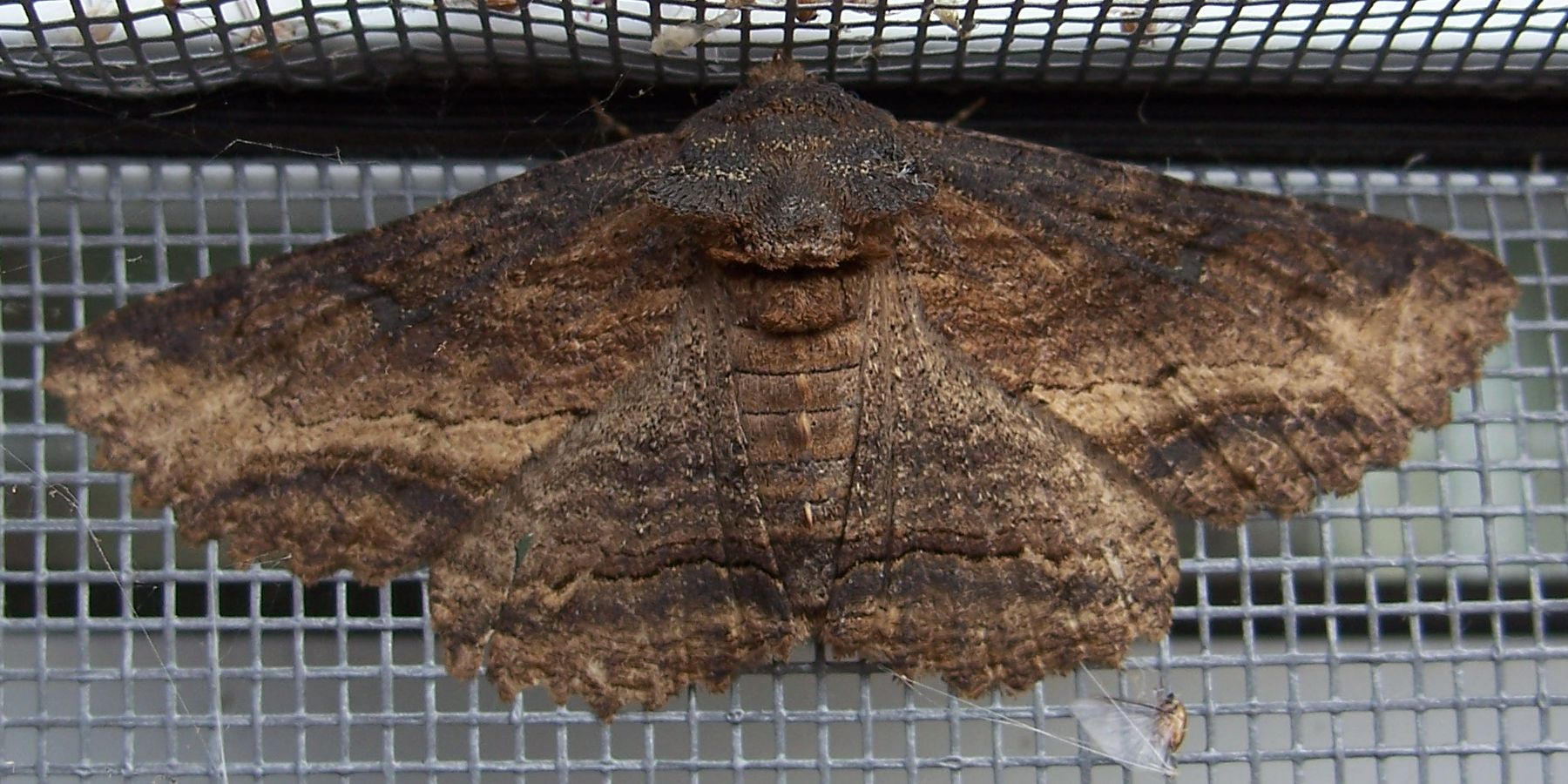

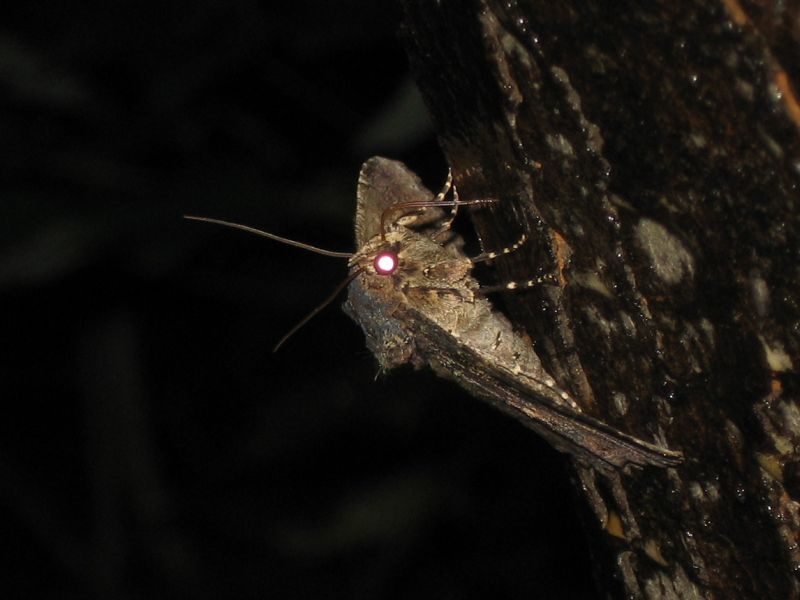

Scientific classification
- Domain: Eukaryota
- Kingdom: Animalia
- Phylum: Arthropoda
- Class: Insecta
- Order: Lepidoptera
- Superfamily: Noctuoidea
- Family: Erebidae
- Genus: Zale
- Species: Z. lunata

Binomial name
- Zale lunata (Drury, 1773)

= Zale lunata =

Species of moth

Zale lunata, the lunate zale, is a moth of the family Erebidae. The species was first described by Dru Drury in 1773. It is found throughout the east and west of North America. The wingspan is 40–55 mm. The moth flies from year round depending on the location. The larvae feed on various deciduous trees, such as maple, willow and Prunus.
