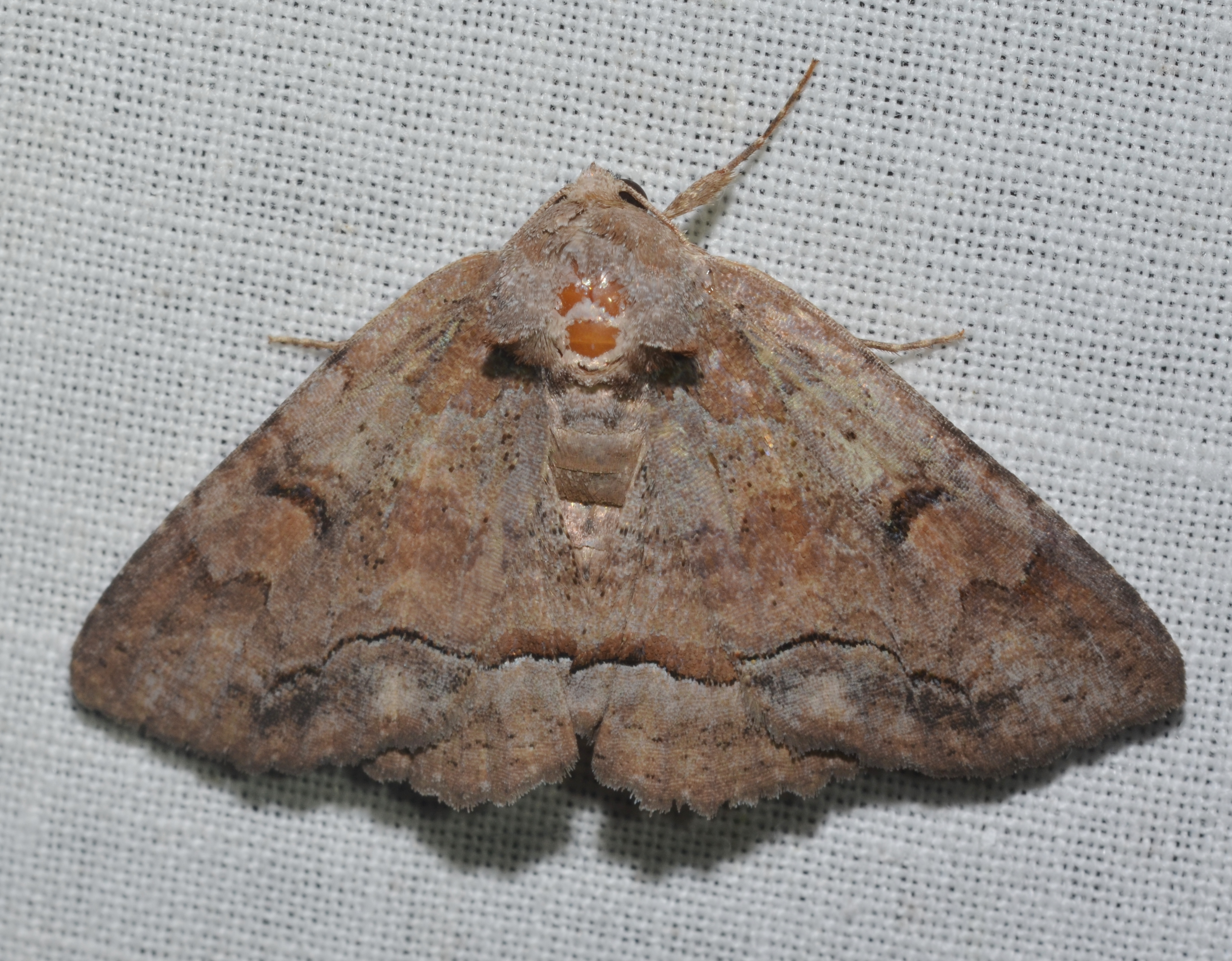

Scientific classification
- Kingdom: Animalia
- Phylum: Arthropoda
- Clade: Pancrustacea
- Class: Insecta
- Order: Lepidoptera
- Superfamily: Noctuoidea
- Family: Erebidae
- Genus: Zale
- Species: Z. confusa

Binomial name
- Zale confusa McDunnough, 1940

= Zale confusa =

Species of moth

Zale confusa, the confused zale moth, is a species of owlet moth in the family Erebidae. The species was first described by James Halliday McDunnough in 1940. It is found in North America.
