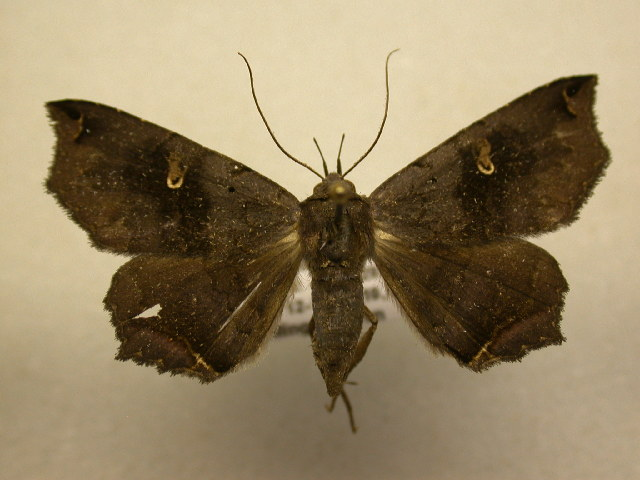

Scientific classification
- Kingdom: Animalia
- Phylum: Arthropoda
- Clade: Pancrustacea
- Class: Insecta
- Order: Lepidoptera
- Superfamily: Noctuoidea
- Family: Erebidae
- Genus: Euclystis
- Species: E. manto

Binomial name
- Euclystis manto (Cramer, 1776)

Synonyms
- Geometra manto Cramer, 1776; Focilla homopteroides Moschler, 1880; Acigona mantalis Hubner, 1825

= Euclystis manto =

Species of moth

Euclystis manto is a species of moth in the family Erebidae. The species is found in Central America (including Costa Rica) and South America (including Guyana).
