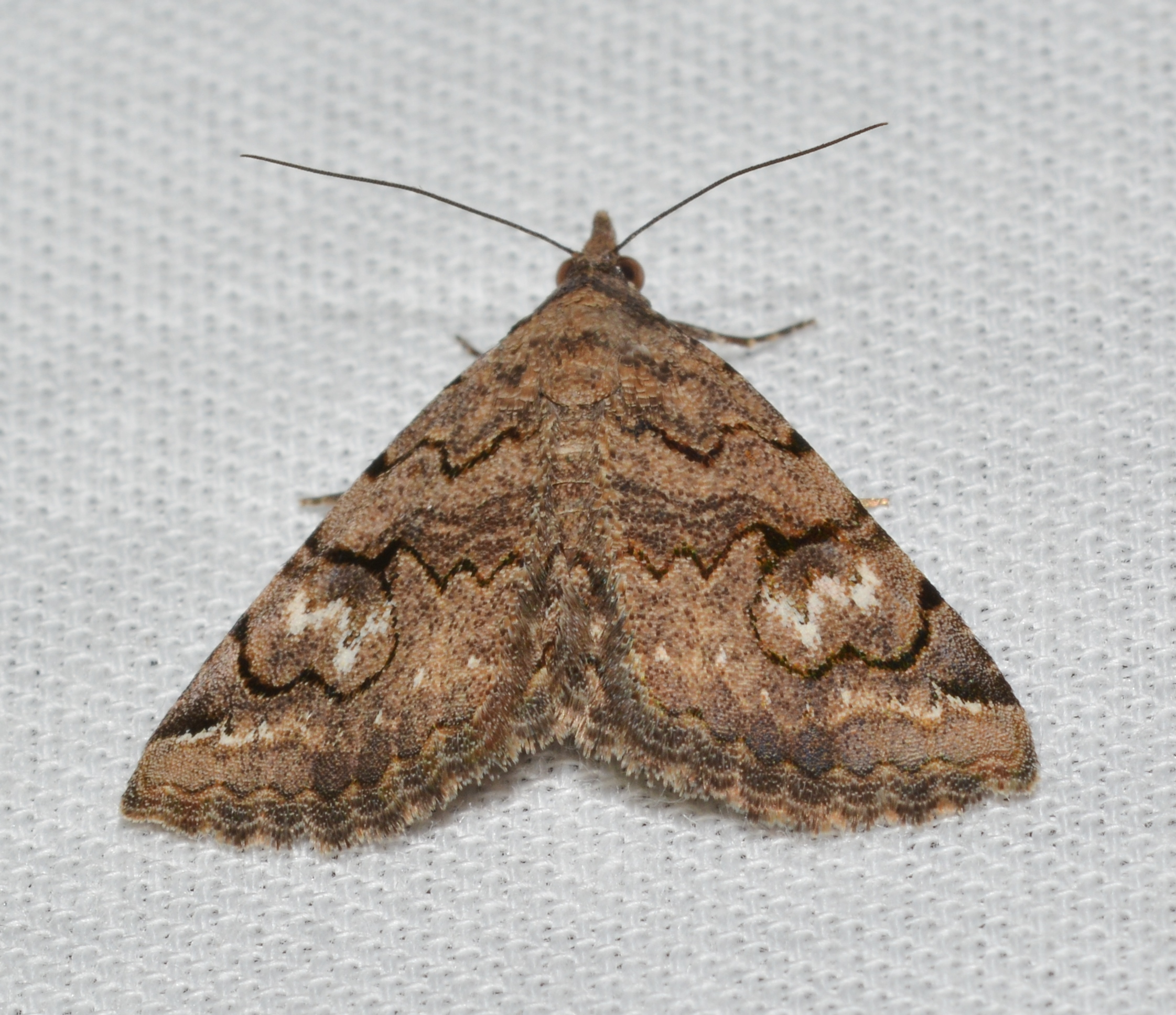
- Toxonprucha repentis

Scientific classification
- Domain: Eukaryota
- Kingdom: Animalia
- Phylum: Arthropoda
- Class: Insecta
- Order: Lepidoptera
- Superfamily: Noctuoidea
- Family: Erebidae
- Tribe: Omopterini
- Genus: Toxonprucha; Möschler, 1890

Synonyms
- Synyrias Hampson, 1926

= Toxonprucha =

Genus of moths

Toxonprucha is a genus of moths in the family Erebidae described by Heinrich Benno Möschler in 1890.

== Species ==
- Toxonprucha aglaia (H. Druce, 1890) Mexico
- Toxonprucha clientis (Grote, 1882) Arizona
- Toxonprucha crudelis (Grote, 1882) Arizona – cruel toxonprucha moth
- Toxonprucha diffundes (Walker, 1858) Antilles, Mexico, Honduras, Venezuela, Brazil
- Toxonprucha scitior (Walker, 1865) Honduras, Guatemala, Mexico, southern Texas
- Toxonprucha excavata (Walker, 1865) Dominican Republic
- Toxonprucha lacerta (Druce, 1890) Mexico
- Toxonprucha pardalis (J. B. Smith, 1908) Arizona – spotted toxonprucha moth
- Toxonprucha psegmapteryx (Dyar, 1913) Mexico
- Toxonprucha repentis (Grote, 1881) Arizona
- Toxonprucha strigalis (J. B. Smith, 1903) Arizona
- Toxonprucha stunia (Schaus, 1901) Mexico
- Toxonprucha volucris (Grote, 1883) Arizona – bird toxonprucha
