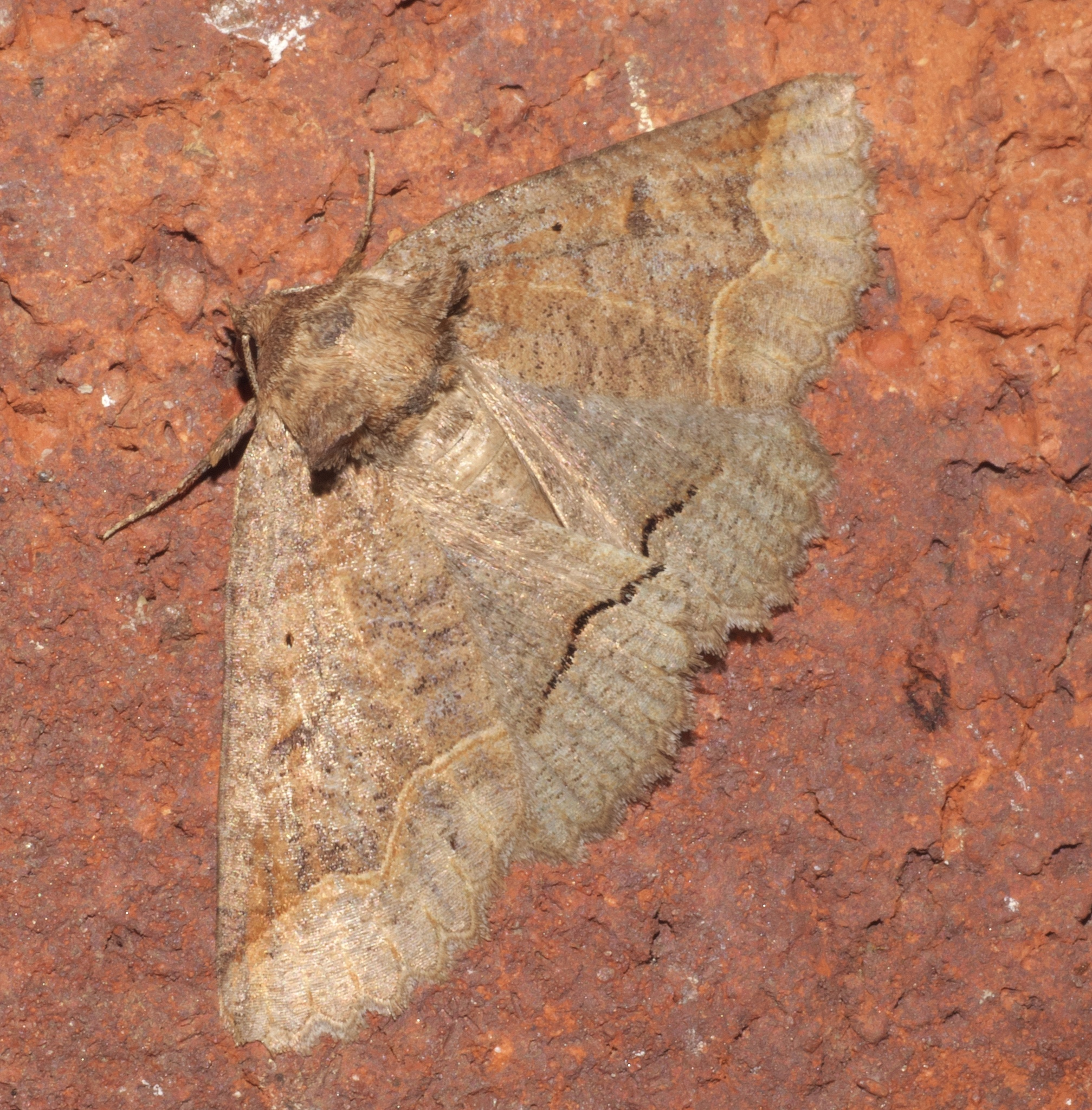
- Zale unilineata, Oklahoma

Scientific classification
- Kingdom: Animalia
- Phylum: Arthropoda
- Class: Insecta
- Order: Lepidoptera
- Superfamily: Noctuoidea
- Family: Erebidae
- Genus: Zale
- Species: Z. unilineata

Binomial name
- Zale unilineata (Grote, 1876)

= Zale unilineata =

Species of moth

Zale unilineata, the one-lined zale, is a species of moth in the family Erebidae. It is found in North America.

The MONA or Hodges number for Zale unilineata is 8716.
