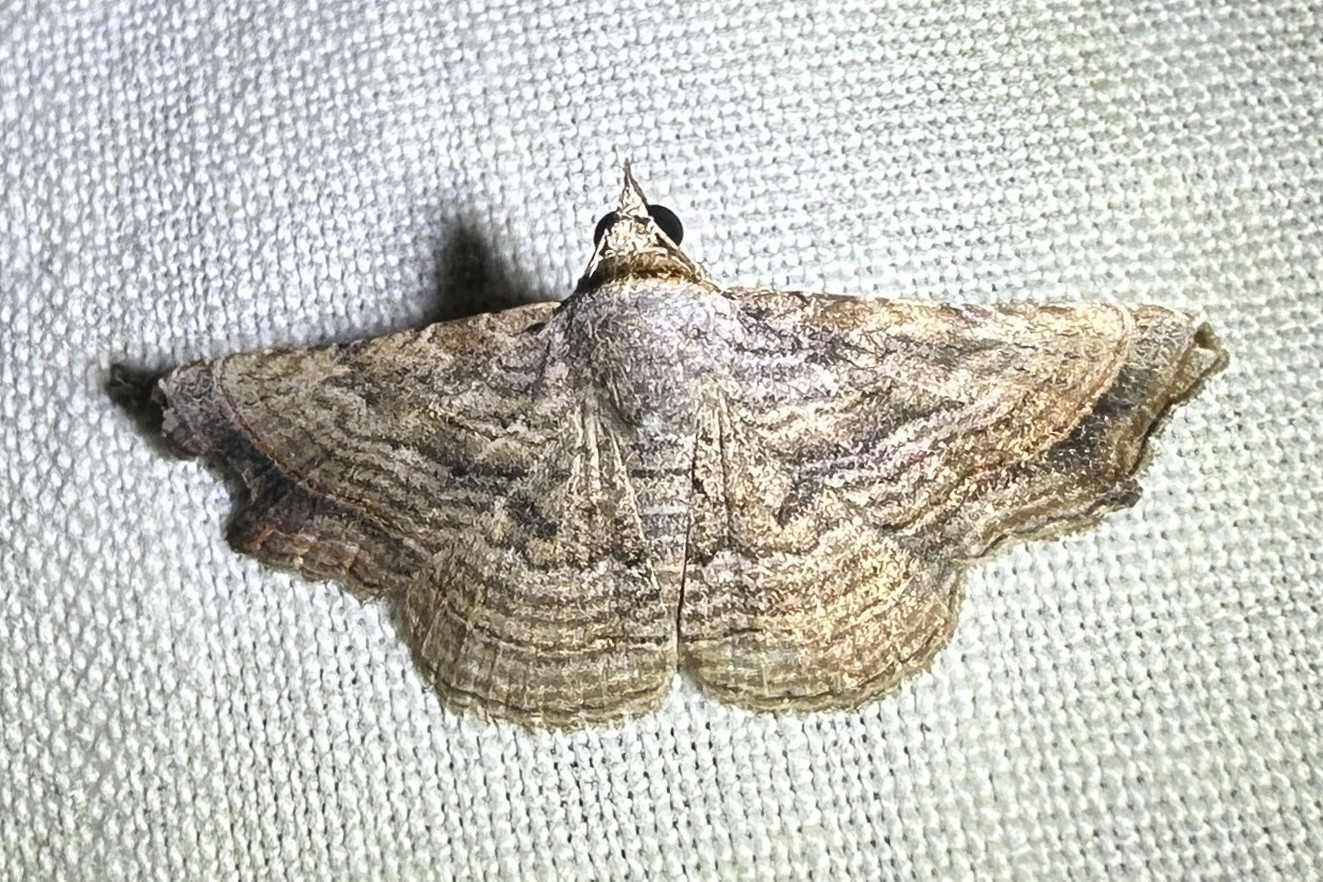

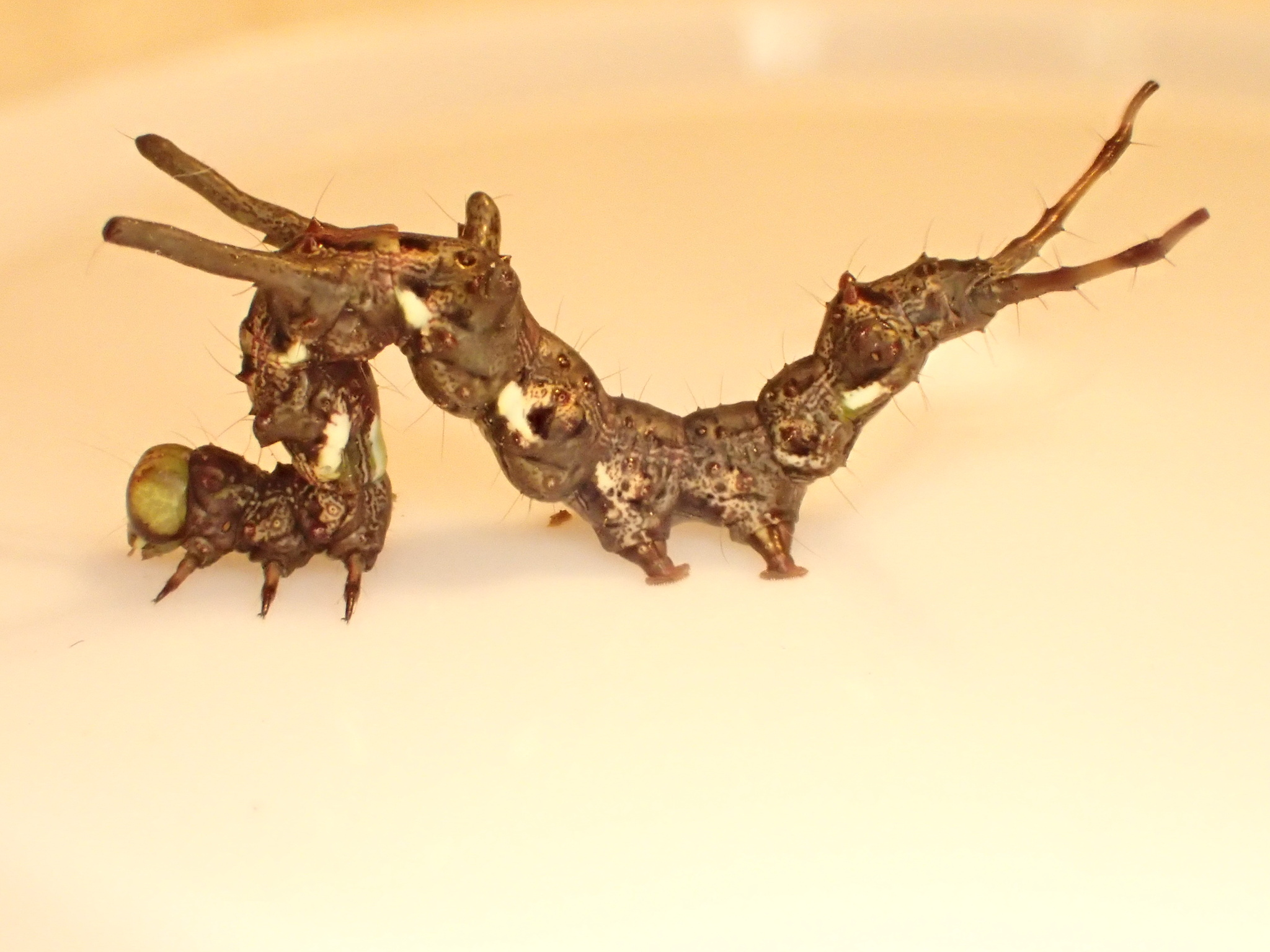
- Adult (top) and larva (bottom)

Scientific classification
- Kingdom: Animalia
- Phylum: Arthropoda
- Clade: Pancrustacea
- Class: Insecta
- Order: Lepidoptera
- Superfamily: Noctuoidea
- Family: Erebidae
- Genus: Tyrissa
- Species: T. multilinea

Binomial name
- Tyrissa multilinea Barnes & McDunnough, 1913

= Tyrissa multilinea =

Species of moth

Tyrissa multilinea is a species of moth in the family Erebidae. It was first described by William Barnes and James Halliday McDunnough in 1913 and is found in North America.
