= Zale declarans =

Scientific classification
- Kingdom: Animalia
- Phylum: Arthropoda
- Class: Insecta
- Order: Lepidoptera
- Superfamily: Noctuoidea
- Family: Erebidae
- Genus: Zale
- Species: Z. declarans

Binomial name
- Zale declarans (Walker, 1858)

Species of moth

Zale declarans, the Dixie zale, is an owlet moth in the family Erebidae. The species was first described by Francis Walker in 1858. It is found in North America.

The MONA or Hodges number for Zale declarans is 8691.
