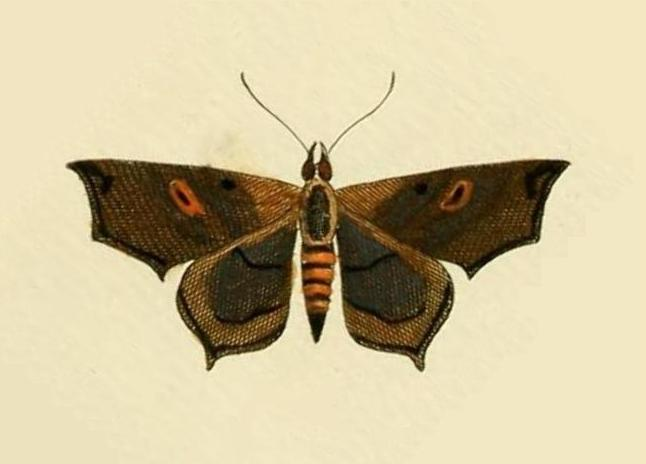
- Euclystis manto

Scientific classification
- Kingdom: Animalia
- Phylum: Arthropoda
- Clade: Pancrustacea
- Class: Insecta
- Order: Lepidoptera
- Superfamily: Noctuoidea
- Family: Erebidae
- Tribe: Omopterini
- Genus: Euclystis; Hübner, 1823

Synonyms
- Acigona Hübner, 1825; Acogona Agassiz, 1847; Focilla Guenee, 1852; Galapha Walker, 1858

= Euclystis =

Genus of moths

Euclystis is a genus of moths in the family Erebidae.

== Species ==
- Euclystis angularis (Moschler, 1886)
- Euclystis antecedens (Walker, 1858)
- Euclystis cayuga Schaus, 1921
- Euclystis centurialis Hubner, 1823
- Euclystis deterrimus (Schaus, 1911)
- Euclystis diascia Hampson, 1926
- Euclystis epidromiaelineatus Feige, 1972
- Euclystis epulea (Herrich-Schaffer, 1858)
- Euclystis facunda (Felder & Rogenhofer, 1874)
- Euclystis fulica (Felder & Rogenhofer, 1874)
- Euclystis furvus (Schaus, 1912)
- Euclystis fuscicilia Hampson, 1926
- Euclystis ghilianii (Guenee, 1852)
- Euclystis golosus (Dognin, 1897)
- Euclystis gorge (Schaus, 1912)
- Euclystis gravidus (Schaus, 1914)
- Euclystis gregalis (Schaus, 1912)
- Euclystis guerini (Guenee, 1852)
- Euclystis infusella Walker
- Euclystis insanus (Guenee, 1852) (or Euclystis insana)
- Euclystis intactus (Felder & Rogenhofer, 1874)
- Euclystis invidiosus (Schaus, 1911)
- Euclystis isoa (Guenee, 1852)
- Euclystis labecia (Druce, 1890)
- Euclystis lacaena (Druce, 1890)
- Euclystis lala (Druce, 1890)
- Euclystis laluma (Schaus, 1915)
- Euclystis manto (Cramer, 1776)
- Euclystis masgaba (Schaus, 1914)
- Euclystis maximus (Druce, 1890)
- Euclystis mnyra Schaus, 1921
- Euclystis myodes Felder & Rogenhofer, 1874
- Euclystis nescia (Schaus, 1911)
- Euclystis onusta (Schaus, 1911)
- Euclystis pallidipes (Schaus, 1911)
- Euclystis perplexus (Schaus, 1911)
- Euclystis plusioides (Walker, 1858)
- Euclystis polioperas Hampson, 1926
- Euclystis polyoperas Schaus, 1921
- Euclystis postponens (Walker, 1858)
- Euclystis proba (Schaus, 1911)
- Euclystis recurvus (Walker, 1858)
- Euclystis steniellus Hampson
- Euclystis sublignaris Schaus, 1911
- Euclystis subtremula Schaus, 1921
- Euclystis sytis (Guenee, 1852)
- Euclystis terraba (Schaus, 1911)
