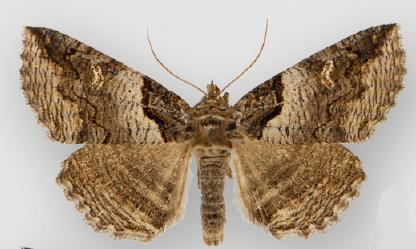

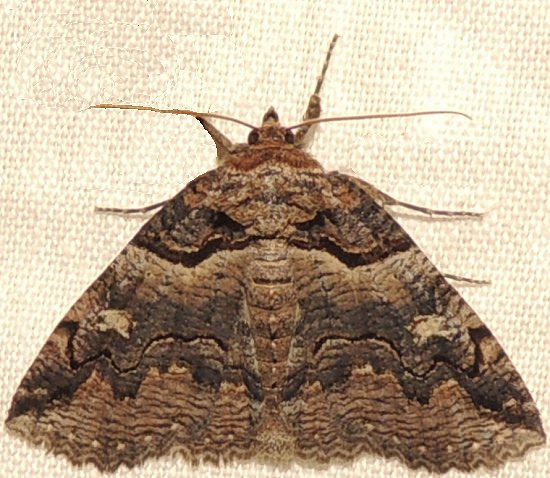

Scientific classification
- Kingdom: Animalia
- Phylum: Arthropoda
- Class: Insecta
- Order: Lepidoptera
- Superfamily: Noctuoidea
- Family: Erebidae
- Genus: Zale
- Species: Z. intenta

Binomial name
- Zale intenta (Walker, [1858])

Synonyms
- Homoptera intenta Walker, [1858]; Homoptera woodii Grote, 1877; Zale calycanthata ab. dealbata Strand, 1916 (unavailable); Zale lunifera not (Hübner, 1818); Homoptera woodii Grote, 1877; Zale woodii

= Zale intenta =

Species of moth

Zale intenta is a moth of the family Noctuidae first described by Francis Walker in 1858. It is found in North America from Nova Scotia westward to Wisconsin and Missouri and southward to Georgia. It probably also occurs in northern Florida, but records may apply to Zale lunifera. The southwestern range limit is not known.

The length of the forewings is about 19.7 mm for males and 20.1 mm for females. The flight period is from March to June depending on latitude and elevation.

The larvae feed on various Prunus species, including black cherry, beach plum and cherry.
