= Zale sabena =

Scientific classification
- Kingdom: Animalia
- Phylum: Arthropoda
- Class: Insecta
- Order: Lepidoptera
- Superfamily: Noctuoidea
- Family: Erebidae
- Genus: Zale
- Species: Z. sabena

Binomial name
- Zale sabena (Schaus, 1901)

Species of moth

Zale sabena is a species of moth in the family Erebidae. It is found in North America.

The MONA or Hodges number for Zale sabena is 8688.
