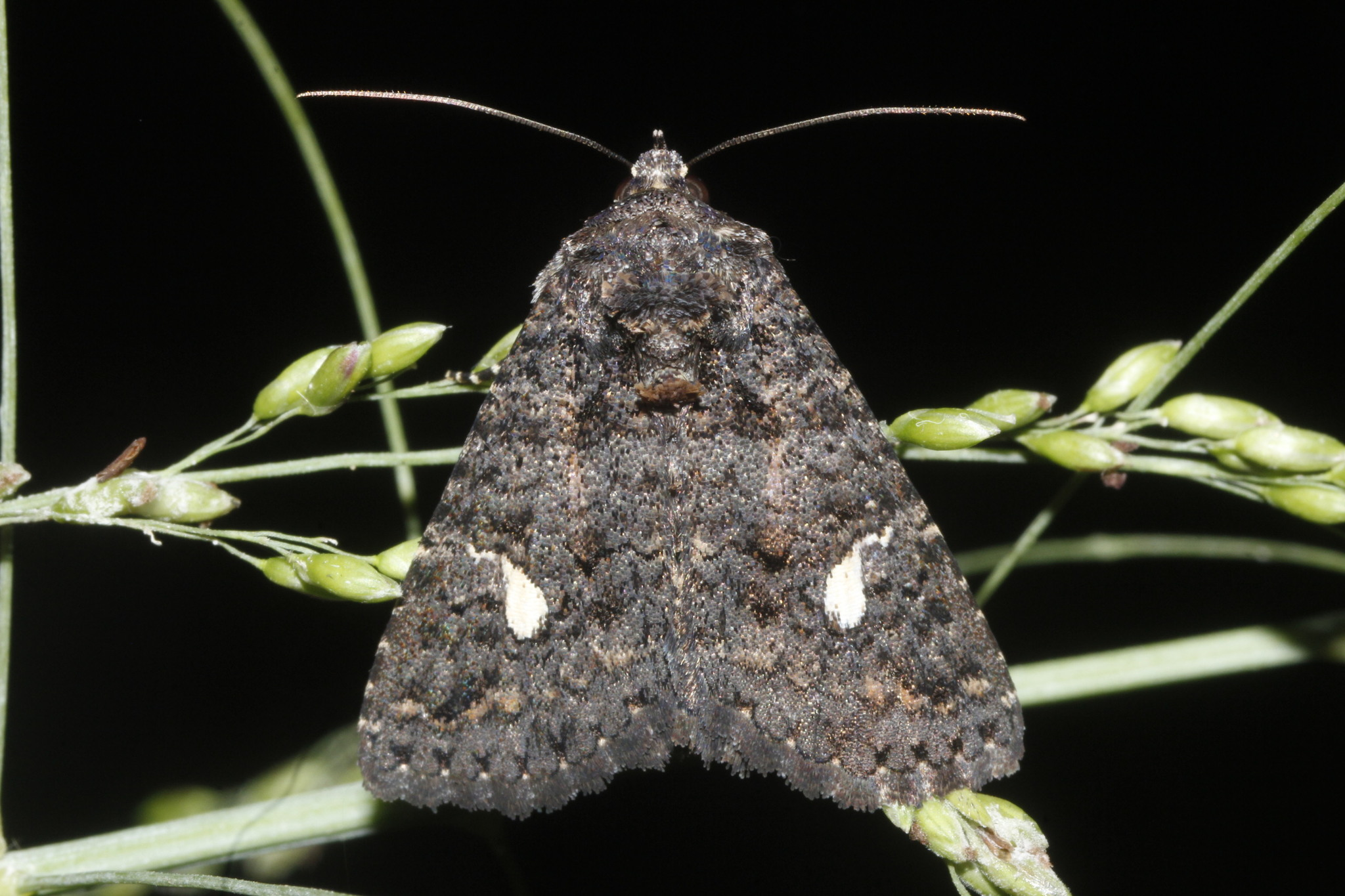
- Coxina cinctipalpis, México

Scientific classification
- Kingdom: Animalia
- Phylum: Arthropoda
- Class: Insecta
- Order: Lepidoptera
- Superfamily: Noctuoidea
- Family: Erebidae
- Genus: Coxina
- Species: C. cinctipalpis

Binomial name
- Coxina cinctipalpis (Smith, 1899)

= Coxina cinctipalpis =

Species of moth

Coxina cinctipalpis, the black-waved owlet, is a species of moth in the family Erebidae. It was described by Smith in 1899 and is found in Mexico and the southern United States.

The MONA or Hodges number for Coxina cinctipalpis is 8662.
