= Toxonprucha crudelis =

Scientific classification
- Domain: Eukaryota
- Kingdom: Animalia
- Phylum: Arthropoda
- Class: Insecta
- Order: Lepidoptera
- Superfamily: Noctuoidea
- Family: Erebidae
- Genus: Toxonprucha
- Species: T. crudelis

Binomial name
- Toxonprucha crudelis (Grote, 1882)

Species of moth

Toxonprucha crudelis, the cruel toxonprucha, is a species of moth in the family Erebidae. It is found in North America.

The MONA or Hodges number for Toxonprucha crudelis is 8674.
