= Toxonprucha psegmapteryx =

Scientific classification
- Kingdom: Animalia
- Phylum: Arthropoda
- Class: Insecta
- Order: Lepidoptera
- Superfamily: Noctuoidea
- Family: Erebidae
- Genus: Toxonprucha
- Species: T. psegmapteryx

Binomial name
- Toxonprucha psegmapteryx (Dyar, 1913)

Species of moth

Toxonprucha psegmapteryx is a species of moth in the family Erebidae. It is found in North America.

The MONA or Hodges number for Toxonprucha psegmapteryx is 8676.
