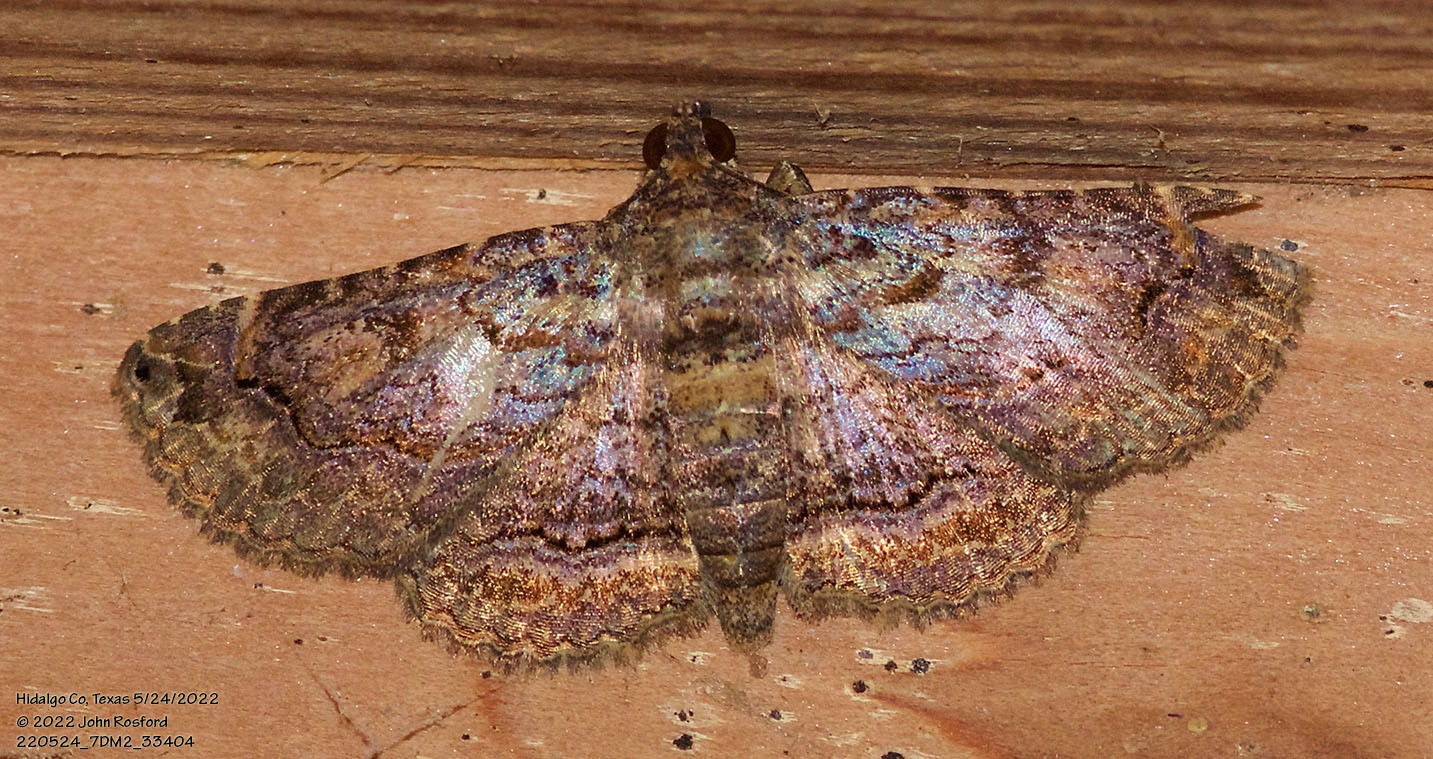
- Kakopoda progenies

Scientific classification
- Domain: Eukaryota
- Kingdom: Animalia
- Phylum: Arthropoda
- Class: Insecta
- Order: Lepidoptera
- Superfamily: Noctuoidea
- Family: Erebidae
- Tribe: Omopterini
- Genus: Kakopoda; J. B. Smith, 1900

Synonyms
- Meridyrias Hampson, 1926; Paryrias Hampson, 1926

= Kakopoda =

Genus of moths

Kakopoda is a genus of moths in the family Erebidae. The genus was erected by J. B. Smith in 1900.

== Species ==
- Kakopoda agarrha (Druce, 1890) Mexico
- Kakopoda mesostigma (Hampson, 1926) Venezuela
- Kakopoda progenies (Guenée, 1852) Florida, Antilles - Brazil
- Kakopoda stygia (Hampson, 1926) Guatemala
- Kakopoda violascens (Hampson, 1926) Guyana
