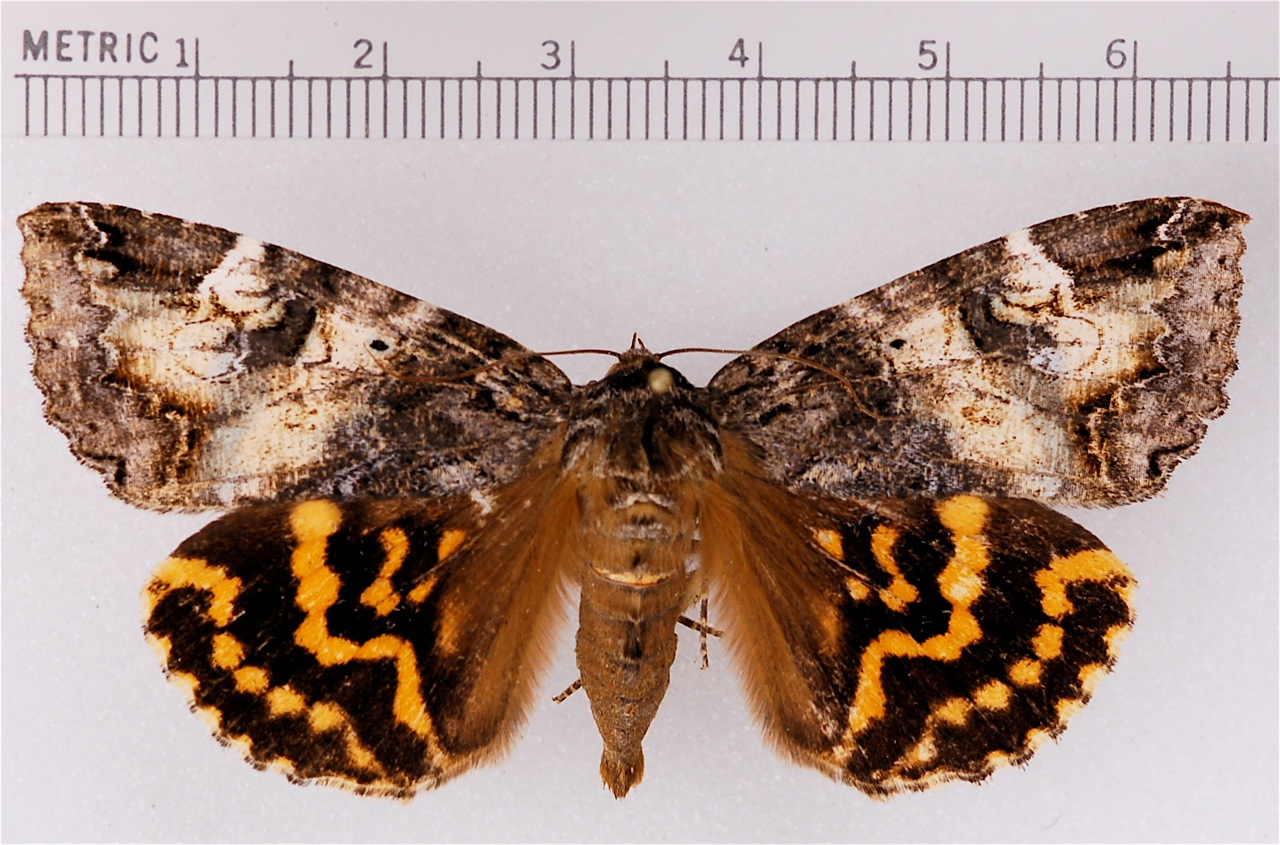
- Upperside of imago (scale in centimeters)
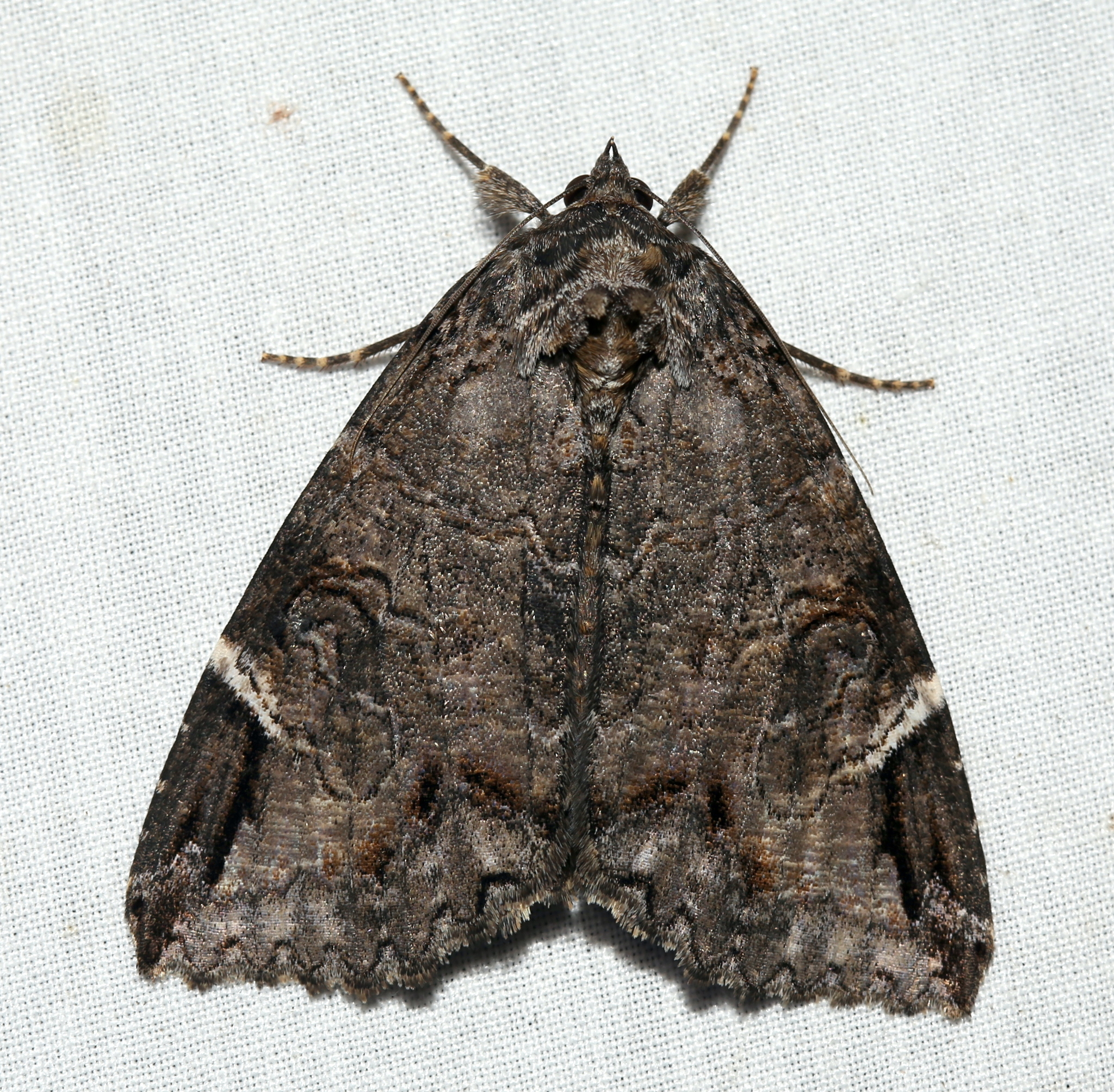

Scientific classification
- Kingdom: Animalia
- Phylum: Arthropoda
- Clade: Pancrustacea
- Class: Insecta
- Order: Lepidoptera
- Superfamily: Noctuoidea
- Family: Erebidae
- Subfamily: Erebinae
- Tribe: Omopterini
- Genus: Euparthenos; Grote, 1876
- Species: E. nubilis

Binomial name
- Euparthenos nubilis (Hübner, 1823)

Synonyms
- See text

= Euparthenos =

Genus of moths

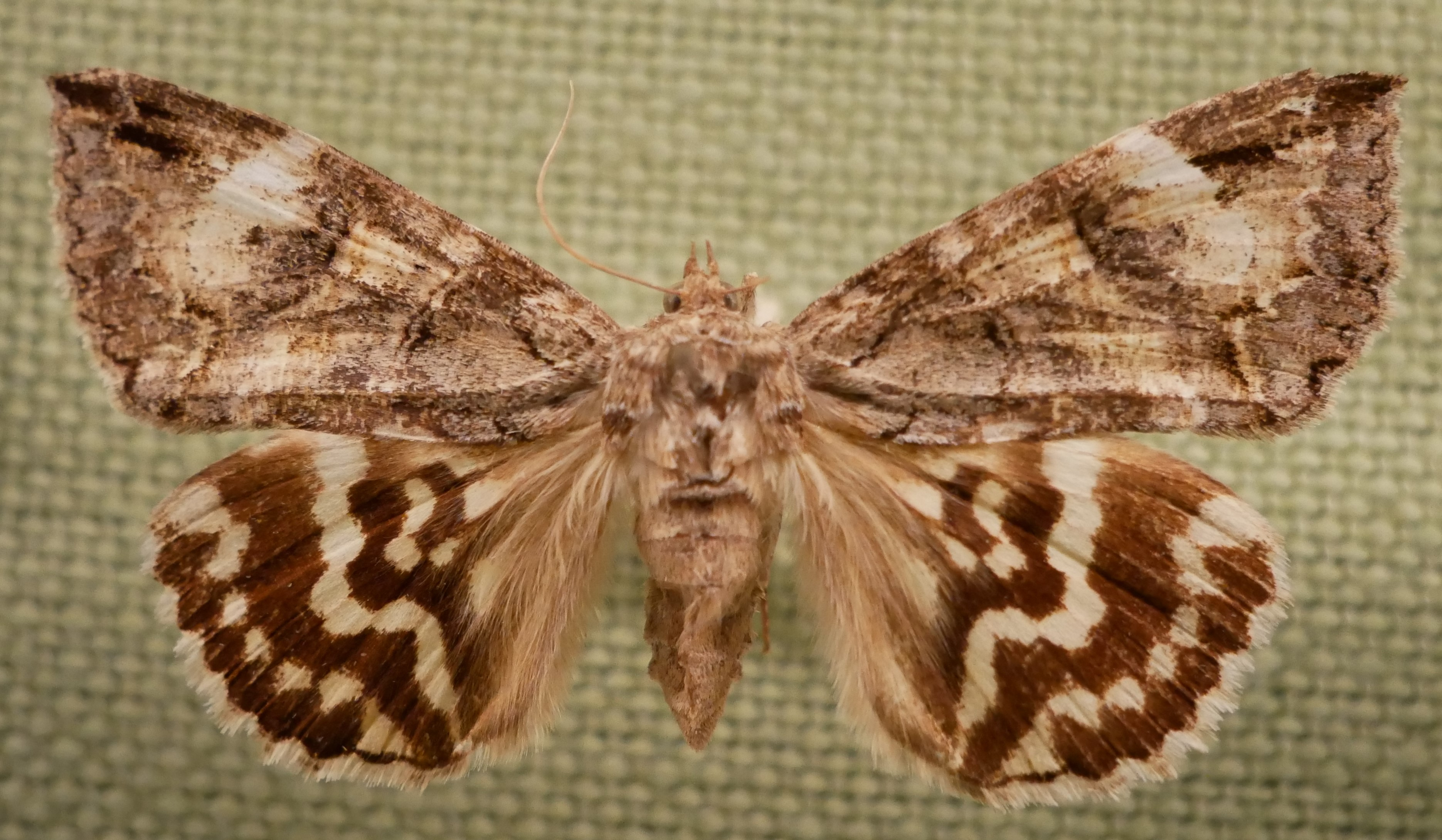
Euparthenos nubilis

Euparthenos is a monotypic genus of moth in the family Erebidae erected by Augustus Radcliffe Grote in 1876. Its only species, Euparthenos nubilis, the locust underwing, was first described by Jacob Hübner in 1823. The adults resemble some of the underwing moths of genus Catocala, which are fairly close relatives, in color, pattern, and the habit of resting on tree trunks. But E. nubilis can usually be immediately recognized by the four concentric black bands per hindwing, as opposed to one or two (at most three) in Catocala. Color morphs of E. nubilis with altered pattern are known, however, and these may be hard to recognize without detailed examination.

This moth has light grey forewings with a pattern of darker grey and brown lines and shading. The hindwings are yellow orange with the aforementioned four black bands each. The wingspan is 56–70 mm (over 2 to almost 3 inches.

The species is found in North America from Maine, Ontario and Quebec, south to northern Florida, west to Nebraska and Arizona. Adults are on wing from April to September. There are two generations per year. The larvae feed on Robinia (locust tree) species, such as black locust (R. pseudoacacia). The adults like to drink the juice of fermenting fruit, and are attracted to lights.

== Systematics and taxonomy ==
=== Classification ===
The species and genus were previously classified in the subfamily Catocalinae of the family Noctuidae and in the tribe Ophiusini of the family Erebidae.

=== Subspecies ===
The species has the following described subspecies.

- Euparthenos nubilis apache (Poling, 1901)
- Euparthenos nubilis nubilis (Hübner, 1823)
- Euparthenos nubilis osiris Barnes & Benjamin, 1926

=== Synonyms ===
The junior synonyms of this moth are:

- Genus-level:
  - Catocalirrhus Andrews, 1877
  - Parthenos Hübner, 1823 (non Hübner, 1819: preoccupied)
- Species-level:
  - Euparthenos faciata (Beutenmüller, 1907)
  - Euparthenos unilineata (Chermock & Chermock, 1940) (morph)
