= Zael =

Zael may refer to:

- Zael, Province of Burgos, a municipality and town in Castile and León, Spain
- Zael, a main character of 2011 action role-playing game The Last Story
- Sahl ibn Bishr, a ninth-century Jewish astrologer, astronomer and mathematician whose name is Latinised as Zael

== See also ==
- Zale (disambiguation)
