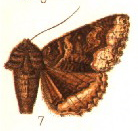

Scientific classification
- Domain: Eukaryota
- Kingdom: Animalia
- Phylum: Arthropoda
- Class: Insecta
- Order: Lepidoptera
- Superfamily: Noctuoidea
- Family: Erebidae
- Genus: Zale
- Species: Z. calycanthata

Binomial name
- Zale calycanthata (J. E. Smith & Abbot, 1797)

= Zale calycanthata =

Double-banded zale

Species of moth

Zale calycanthata, the double-banded zale, is a moth of the family Erebidae. The species was first described by James Edward Smith and John Abbot in 1797. It is found in eastern North America. Adults are in flight in abundance from March to April, with some records from February to May.
