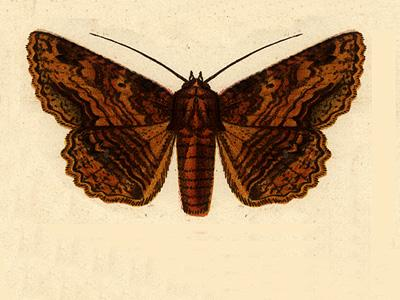

Scientific classification
- Kingdom: Animalia
- Phylum: Arthropoda
- Class: Insecta
- Order: Lepidoptera
- Superfamily: Noctuoidea
- Family: Erebidae
- Genus: Zale
- Species: Z. rufosa

Binomial name
- Zale rufosa Hampson, 1913

= Zale rufosa =

Species of moth

Zale rufosa is a moth of the family Noctuidae. It is found on Jamaica.
