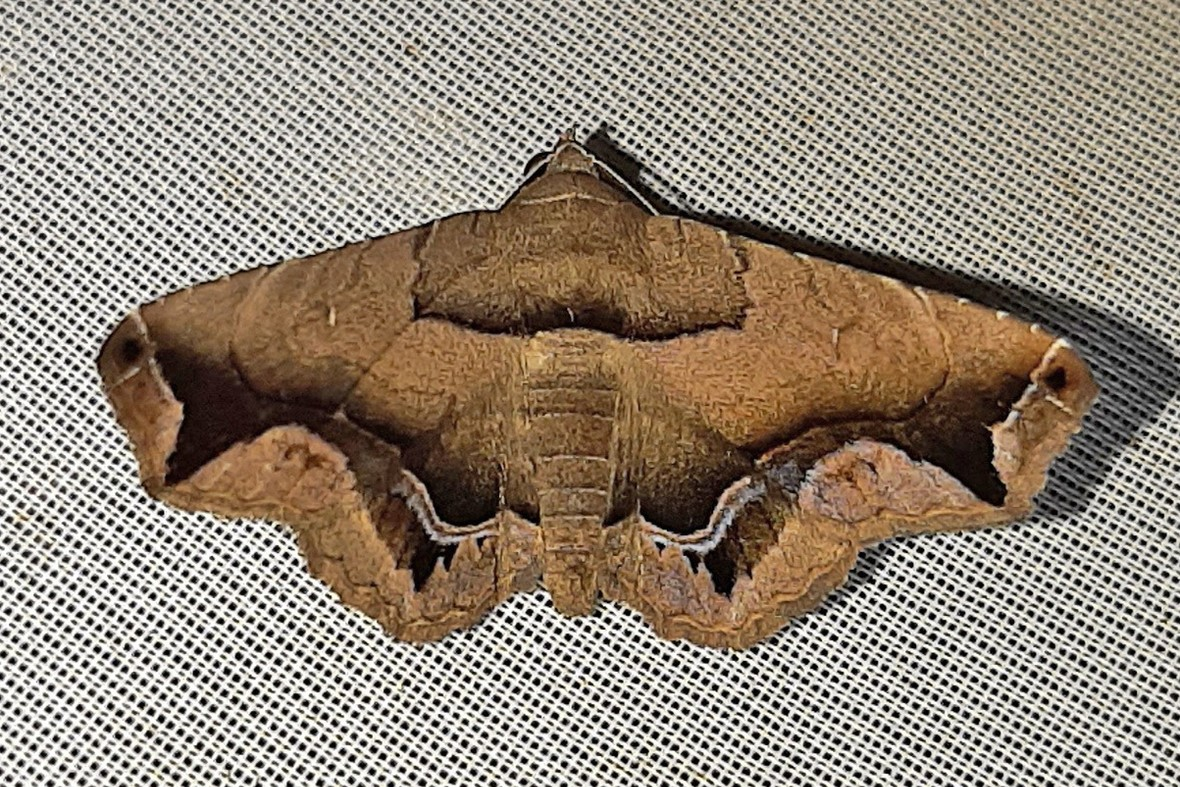
- Tyrissa acygonia

Scientific classification
- Kingdom: Animalia
- Phylum: Arthropoda
- Clade: Pancrustacea
- Class: Insecta
- Order: Lepidoptera
- Superfamily: Noctuoidea
- Family: Erebidae
- Tribe: Omopterini
- Genus: Tyrissa; Walker, 1866

= Tyrissa =

Genus of moths

Tyrissa is a genus of moths in the family Erebidae. The genus was erected by Francis Walker in 1866.

== Species ==
- Tyrissa abscisa Schaus, 1912 Suriname
- Tyrissa acygonia (Hampson, 1924) Paraguay
- Tyrissa bellula Schaus, 1912 French Guiana
- Tyrissa carola Schaus, 1906 Rio de Janeiro in Brazil
- Tyrissa laurentia Dognin, 1912 French Guiana
- Tyrissa mascara (Schaus, 1906) Parana in Brazil
- Tyrissa multilinea Barnes & McDunnough, 1913 Florida
- Tyrissa perstrigata Schaus, 1911 Costa Rica
- Tyrissa polygrapha Hampson, 1926 Rio de Janeiro in Brazil
- Tyrissa recurva Walker, 1866 south Florida, Dominican Republic
- Tyrissa siaha (Schaus, 1911) Costa Rica
- Tyrissa thara (Schaus, 1906) Rio de Janeiro in Brazil
