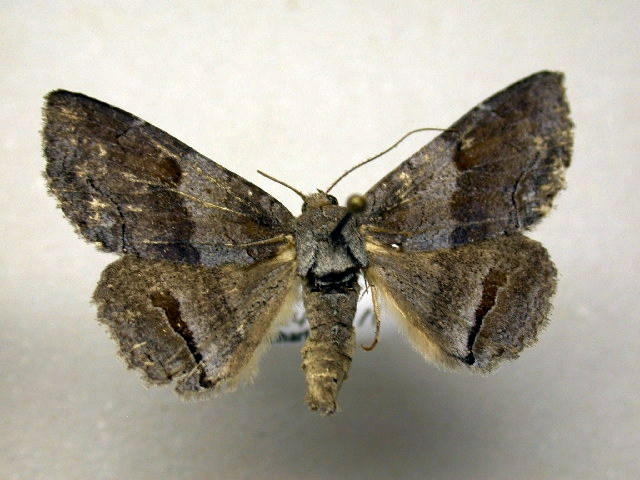

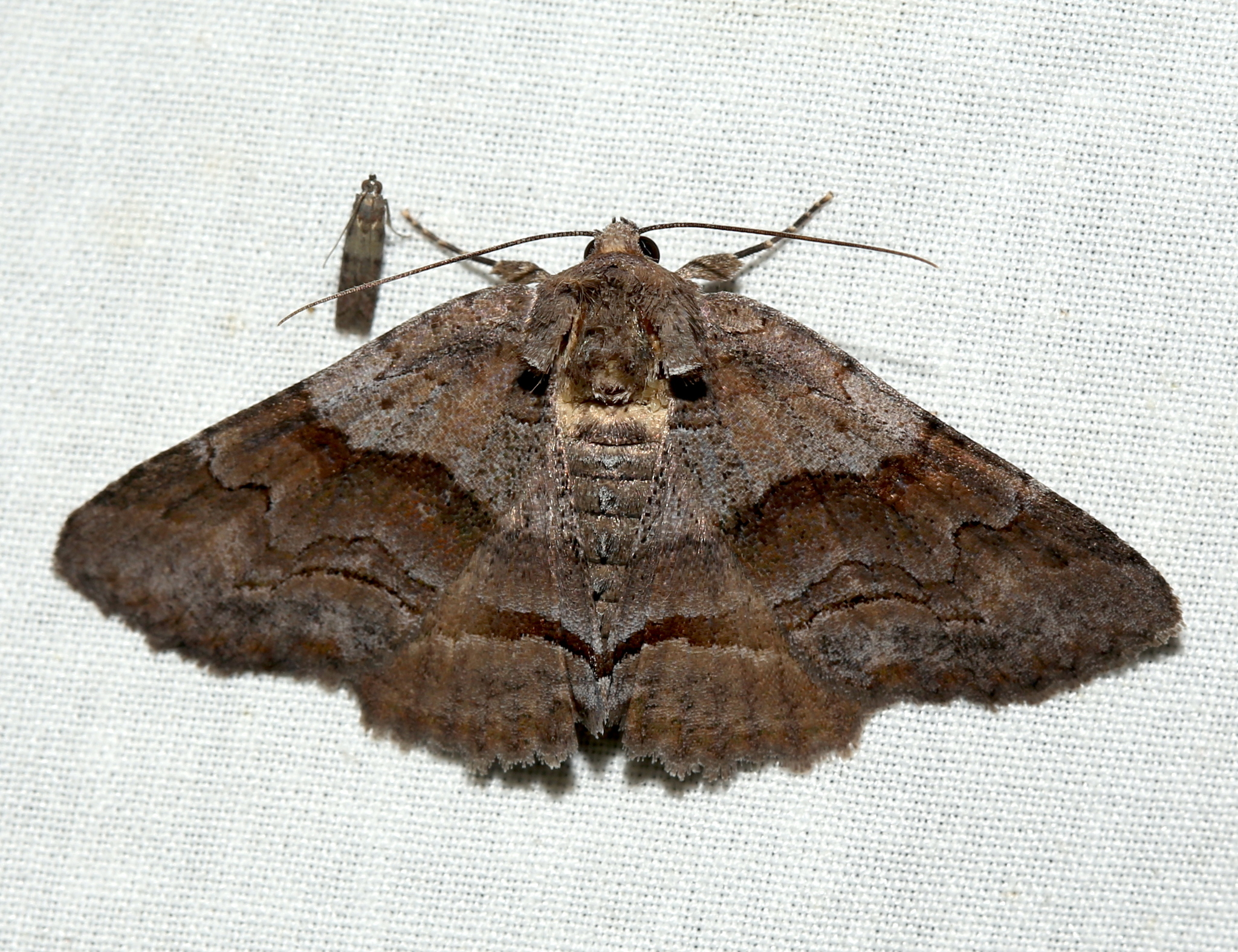

Scientific classification
- Kingdom: Animalia
- Phylum: Arthropoda
- Class: Insecta
- Order: Lepidoptera
- Superfamily: Noctuoidea
- Family: Erebidae
- Genus: Zale
- Species: Z. squamularis

Binomial name
- Zale squamularis (Drury, 1773)

Synonyms
- Zale lapidaria Haimbach, 1928 (form)

= Zale squamularis =

Species of moth

Zale squamularis, the gray-banded zale, is a moth of the family Noctuidae. The species was first described by Dru Drury in 1773. It is found in the US from Ohio to Long Island, south to Florida and Texas.

The wingspan is about 38 mm. There are two to three generations in New Jersey.

The larvae feed on pitch pine, pond pine and probably other hard pines. It prefers mature needles.
