= Toxonprucha clientis =

Scientific classification
- Domain: Eukaryota
- Kingdom: Animalia
- Phylum: Arthropoda
- Class: Insecta
- Order: Lepidoptera
- Superfamily: Noctuoidea
- Family: Erebidae
- Genus: Toxonprucha
- Species: T. clientis

Binomial name
- Toxonprucha clientis (Grote, 1882)

Species of moth

Toxonprucha clientis is a species of moth in the family Erebidae. It is found in North America.

The MONA or Hodges number for Toxonprucha clientis is 8675.
