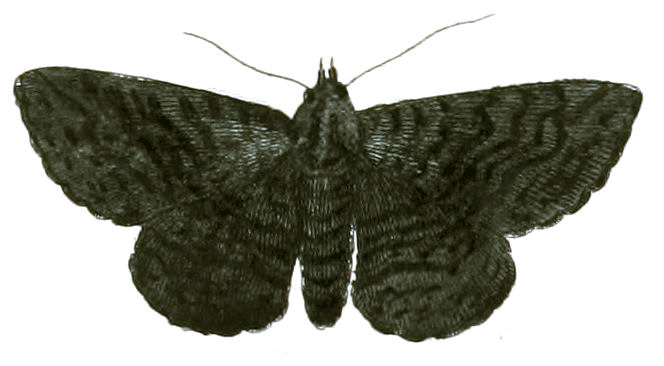

Scientific classification
- Domain: Eukaryota
- Kingdom: Animalia
- Phylum: Arthropoda
- Class: Insecta
- Order: Lepidoptera
- Superfamily: Noctuoidea
- Family: Erebidae
- Genus: Zale
- Species: Z. undularis

Binomial name
- Zale undularis (Drury, 1773)

Synonyms
- Phalaena undularis Drury, 1773; Homoptera nigricans Bethune, 1865; Zale nigricans; Zale umbripennis Grote, 1876; Zale albosquamulata Strand, 1917

= Zale undularis =

Black zale moth

Species of moth

Zale undularis, the black zale moth, is a moth of the family Noctuidae (or in some classifications, Erebidae). The species was first described by Dru Drury in 1773. It is found in the eastern United States and southern Ontario.

== Description ==
Upperside: the antennae are brown and thread like. The head, body, abdomen, and wings are of a very dark brown, bordering on black, and appear somewhat glossy. All the wings are a little dentated, and on the anterior ones, from the base to the extremity, is a series of black indented lines or bars, whereof the last or outer one is strong and conspicuous, crossing the wing from the anterior to the posterior edges, about a quarter of an inch from the external margin. The posterior wings are marked exactly like the superior.

The underside is of a lighter colour, with the same kind of markings, but fainter. The wingspan is about 2 inches (5 cm).
