= Zale metatoides =

Scientific classification
- Domain: Eukaryota
- Kingdom: Animalia
- Phylum: Arthropoda
- Class: Insecta
- Order: Lepidoptera
- Superfamily: Noctuoidea
- Family: Erebidae
- Genus: Zale
- Species: Z. metatoides

Binomial name
- Zale metatoides McDunnough, 1943

Species of moth

Zale metatoides, the washed-out zale or jack pine false looper, is a moth of the family Noctuidae. The species was first described by James Halliday McDunnough in 1943. It is found in barrens and pine woodlands from at least Wisconsin and probably Manitoba to Maine, south to the mountains of Georgia. The range in the Gulf States is not certain.

The wingspan is about 35 mm. There is one generation per year.
