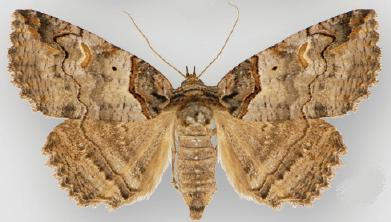

Scientific classification
- Kingdom: Animalia
- Phylum: Arthropoda
- Class: Insecta
- Order: Lepidoptera
- Superfamily: Noctuoidea
- Family: Erebidae
- Genus: Zale
- Species: Z. lunifera

Binomial name
- Zale lunifera (Hübner, 1818)

Synonyms
- Phaeocyma lunifera Hübner, 1818; Homoptera cingulifera Walker, [1858]

= Zale lunifera =

Bold-based zale

Species of moth

Zale lunifera, the bold-based zale or pine barrens zale, is a moth of the family Noctuidae. The species was first described by Jacob Hübner in 1818. It occurs primarily east and south of the Appalachian Mountains, from southern Maine south to Lee County, Mississippi, Mississippi and Florida. It is not known from south-eastern Virginia or South Carolina, but the species may occur in these regions. Lack of suitable habitat in Maryland and Delaware makes occurrence in these states unlikely. It also occurs inland to the mountains of Virginia and Lebanon County, Pennsylvania. In south-eastern Georgia it inhabits open, sandy pine-oak forest.

The wingspan is 37–45 mm. Adults are on wing from April to May and from July to August.

The larvae feed on various Quercus ilicifolia and other scrub oak species.
