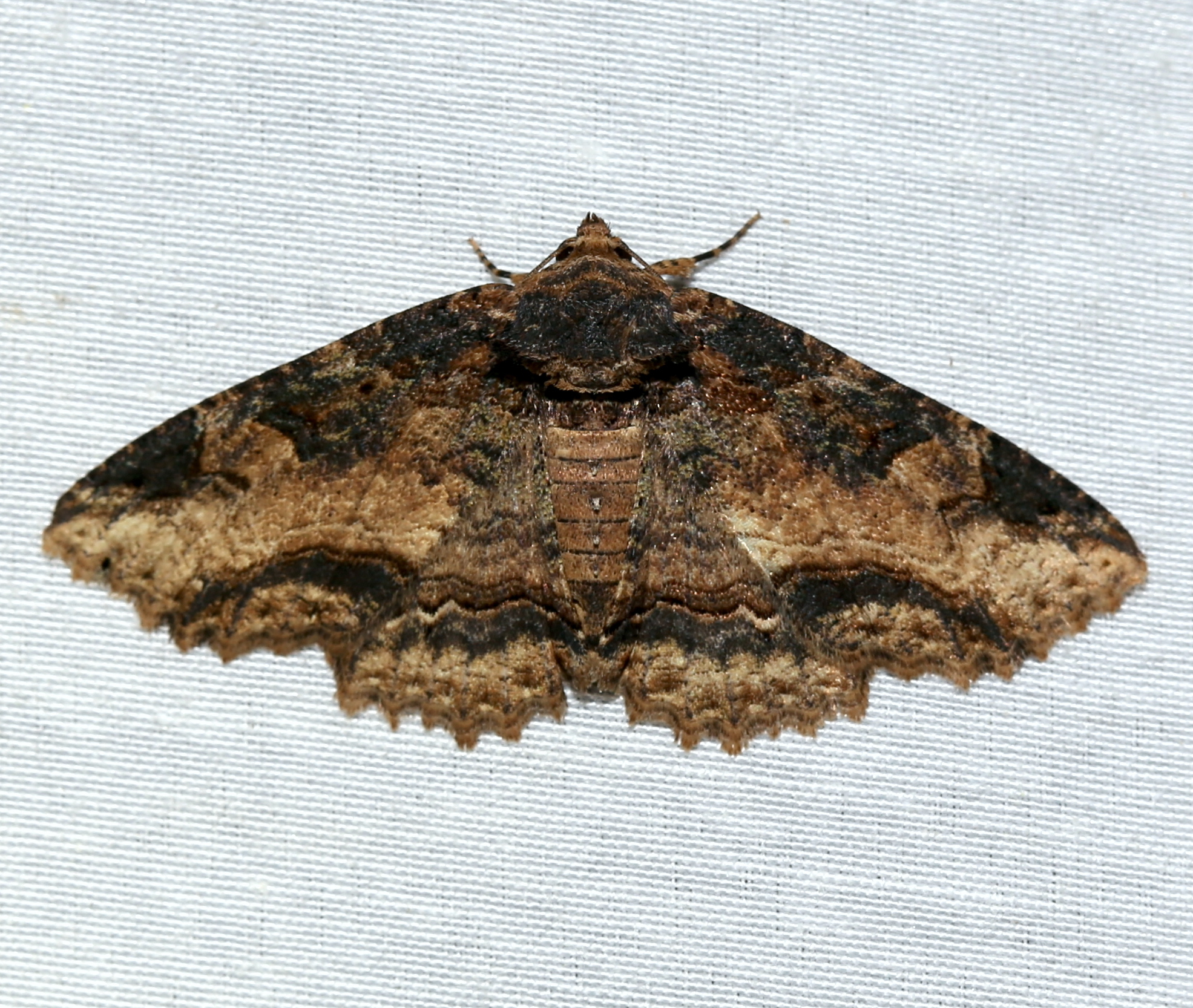

Scientific classification
- Kingdom: Animalia
- Phylum: Arthropoda
- Clade: Pancrustacea
- Class: Insecta
- Order: Lepidoptera
- Superfamily: Noctuoidea
- Family: Erebidae
- Genus: Zale
- Species: Z. minerea

Binomial name
- Zale minerea (Guenee, 1852)

= Zale minerea =

Species of moth

Zale minerea, commonly known as colorful zale, large false looper or mahogany similar-wing, is a species of owlet moth in the family Erebidae. The species was first described by Achille Guenée in 1852. It is found in North America.

== Subspecies ==
There are two subspecies:

- Zale minerea minerea
- Zale minerea norda Smith, 1909
