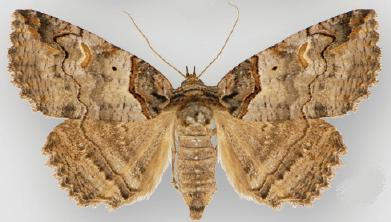
- Bold-based zale (Zale lunifera)

Scientific classification
- Kingdom: Animalia
- Phylum: Arthropoda
- Clade: Pancrustacea
- Class: Insecta
- Order: Lepidoptera
- Superfamily: Noctuoidea
- Family: Erebidae
- Tribe: Omopterini
- Genus: Zale; Hübner, 1818

Synonyms
- Omoptera Guérin-Méneville, 1832; Homoptera Guenée, 1852; Nephelina Kirby, 1897; Phaeocyma Hübner, 1818; Xylis Guenée, 1852; Ypsia Guenée, 1852

= Zale (moth) =

Genus of moths

Zale is a genus of moths in the family Erebidae erected by Jacob Hübner in 1818.

== Description ==
Palpi with second joint reaching vertex of head, and short third joint. Antennae of male with short fasciculate (bundled) cilia. Metathorax with a slight tuft. Abdomen with prominent dorsal tufts. Tibia of male heavily hairy. Mid tibia spined. Larva with four pairs of abdominal prolegs, where the first two pairs aborted or rudimentary.

== Species ==
- Zale aeruginosa Guenée, 1852 – green-dusted zale moth
- Zale bethunei J. B. Smith, 1908 – Bethune's zale moth
- Zale buchholzi McDunnough, 1943 – Buchholz's zale moth
- Zale calycantha J. E. Smith, 1797 – double-banded zale moth
- Zale chisosensis Blanchard & Franclemont, 1982
- Zale colorado J. B. Smith, 1908
- Zale confusa McDunnough, 1940
- Zale curema J. B. Smith, 1908 – black-eyed zale moth or northeastern pine zale moth
- Zale declarans Walker, 1858
- Zale duplicata Bethune, 1865 – pine false looper moth, banded similar-wing moth, or grey similar-wing moth
- Zale edusina Harvey, 1875
- Zale exhausta Guenée, 1852
- Zale fictilis Guenée, 1852
- Zale galbanata Morrison, 1876 – maple zale moth
- Zale helata J. B. Smith, 1908 – brown-spotted zale moth
- Zale horrida Hübner, 1818 – horrid zale moth
- Zale insuda J. B. Smith, 1908
- Zale intenta (Walker, [1858])
- Zale lunata Drury, 1773 – lunate zale moth
- Zale lunifera Hübner, 1818 – bold-based zale moth
- Zale meriata (Martyn, 1797)
- Zale metata J. B. Smith, 1908
- Zale metatoides McDunnough, 1943 – washed-out zale moth or jack pine false looper
- Zale minerea Guenée, 1852 – colorful zale moth
- Zale obliqua Guenée, 1952 – oblique zale moth
- Zale obsita (Guenée, 1852)
- Zale perculta Franclemont, 1964 – Okefenokee zale moth
- Zale peruncta (Guenée, 1852)
- Zale phaeocapna Franclemont, 1950
- Zale rubi H. Edwards, 1881
- Zale rubiata J. B. Smith, 1908
- Zale rufosa Hampson, 1913
- Zale sabena Schaus, 1901
- Zale smithi Haimbach, 1928
- Zale squamularis Drury, 1773 – gray-banded zale moth
- Zale strigimacula Guenée, 1852
- Zale submediana Strand, 1917– gray spring zale moth
- Zale termina Grote, 1883
- Zale undularis Drury, 1773 – black zale moth
- Zale unilineata Grote, 1876 – one-lined zale moth
- Zale viridans Guenée, 1852
