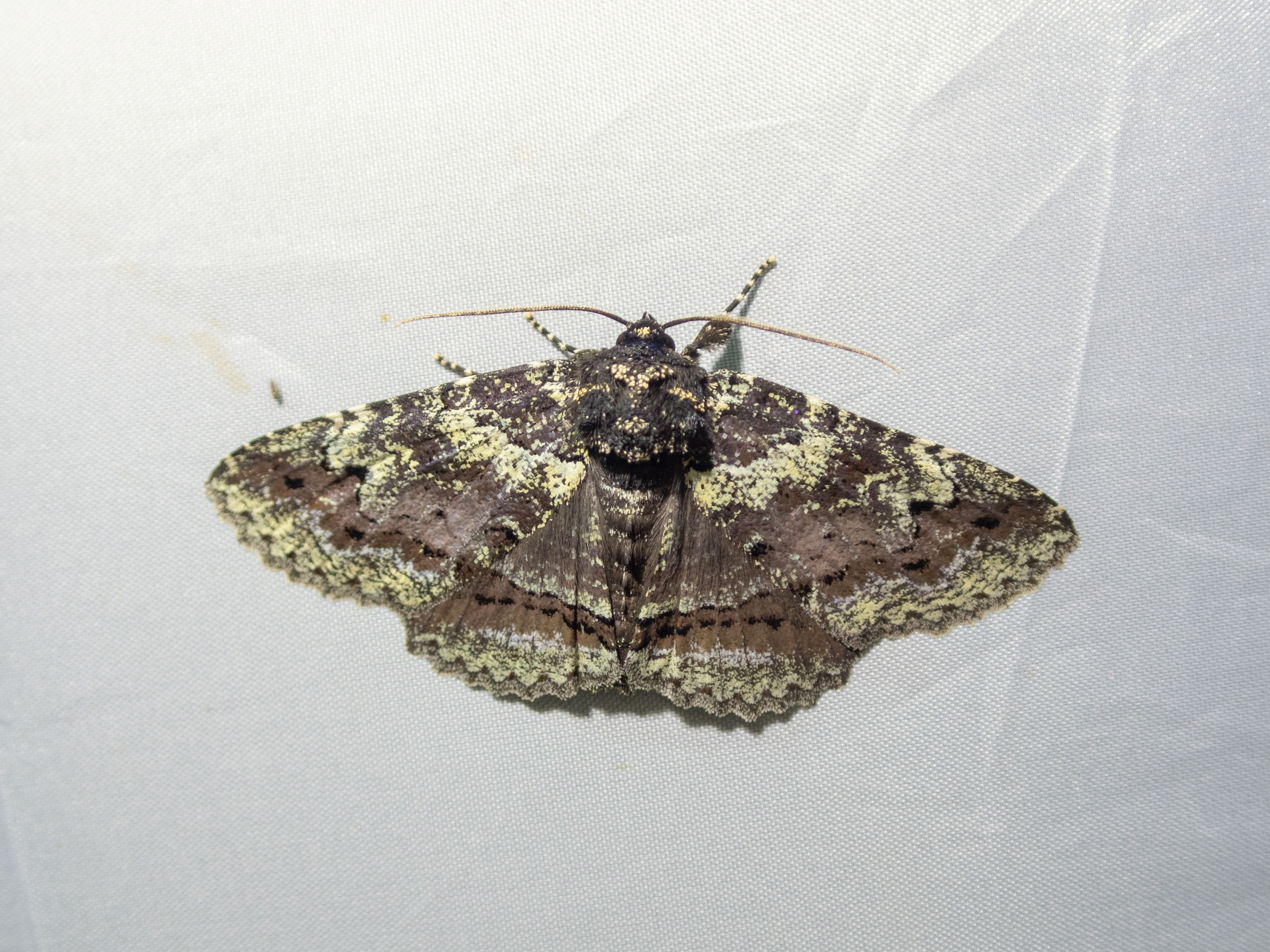
- Zale perculta

Scientific classification
- Domain: Eukaryota
- Kingdom: Animalia
- Phylum: Arthropoda
- Class: Insecta
- Order: Lepidoptera
- Superfamily: Noctuoidea
- Family: Erebidae
- Subfamily: Erebinae
- Tribe: Omopterini; Boisduval, 1833

= Omopterini =

Tribe of moths

The Omopterini are a tribe of moths in the family Erebidae.

== Taxonomy ==
The tribe was split from the tribe Ophiusini (also in the subfamily Erebinae) after phylogenetic analysis showed that the New World genera were not the closest relatives of the other genera in the Ophiusini.

== Genera ==
- Acritogramma
- Amolita
- Bendisodes
- Coenipeta
- Coxina
- Elousa
- Epidromia
- Eubolina
- Euclystis
- Euparthenos
- Helia
- Heteranassa
- Itomia
- Kakopoda
- Lesmone
- Matigramma
- Metria
- Pseudanthracia
- Selenisa
- Toxonprucha
- Tyrissa
- Zale
- Zaleops
