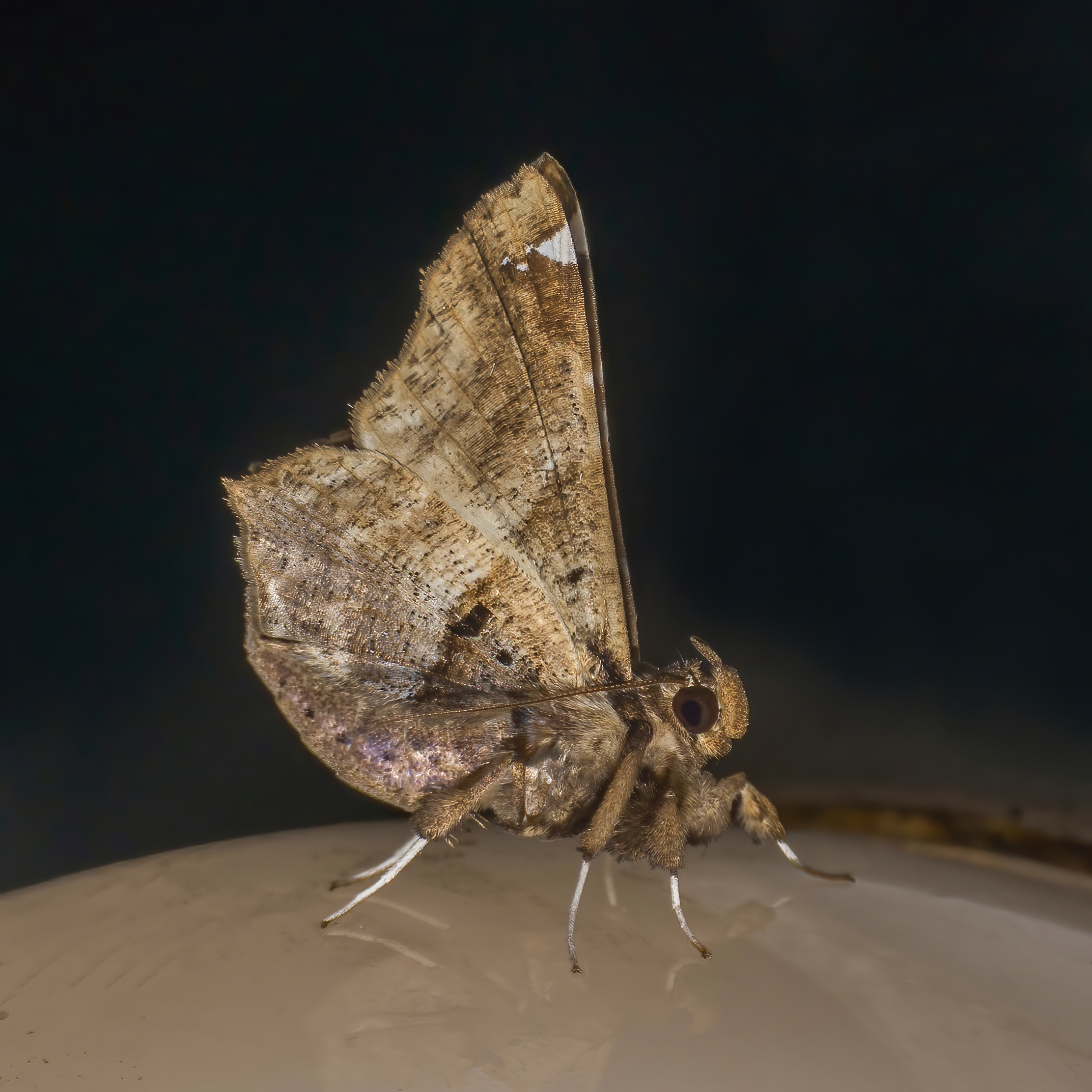
- Amphigonia cf. hepatizans Sinharaja Forest, Viharahena, Sri Lanka

Scientific classification
- Kingdom: Animalia
- Phylum: Arthropoda
- Class: Insecta
- Order: Lepidoptera
- Superfamily: Noctuoidea
- Family: Erebidae
- Subfamily: Erebinae
- Genus: Amphigonia; Guenée, 1852

Synonyms
- Acygoniodes Hampson, 1926

= Amphigonia =

Genus of moths

Amphigonia is a genus of moths of the family Noctuidae erected by Achille Guenée in 1852.

== Description ==
Palpi with second joint reaching above the vertex of the head. Third joint in male curved forwards, with a tuft of hair on the inner side. Antennae of male very long and minutely ciliated. Thorax and abdomen smoothly scaled. Tibia hairy. Forewings with arched towards apex, which is produced and acute. Outer margin highly angled at center. Hindwings with produced outer margin to a curved point at vein 4.

== Species ==
- Amphigonia hepatizans Guenée, 1852
- Amphigonia motisigna Prout, 1928
