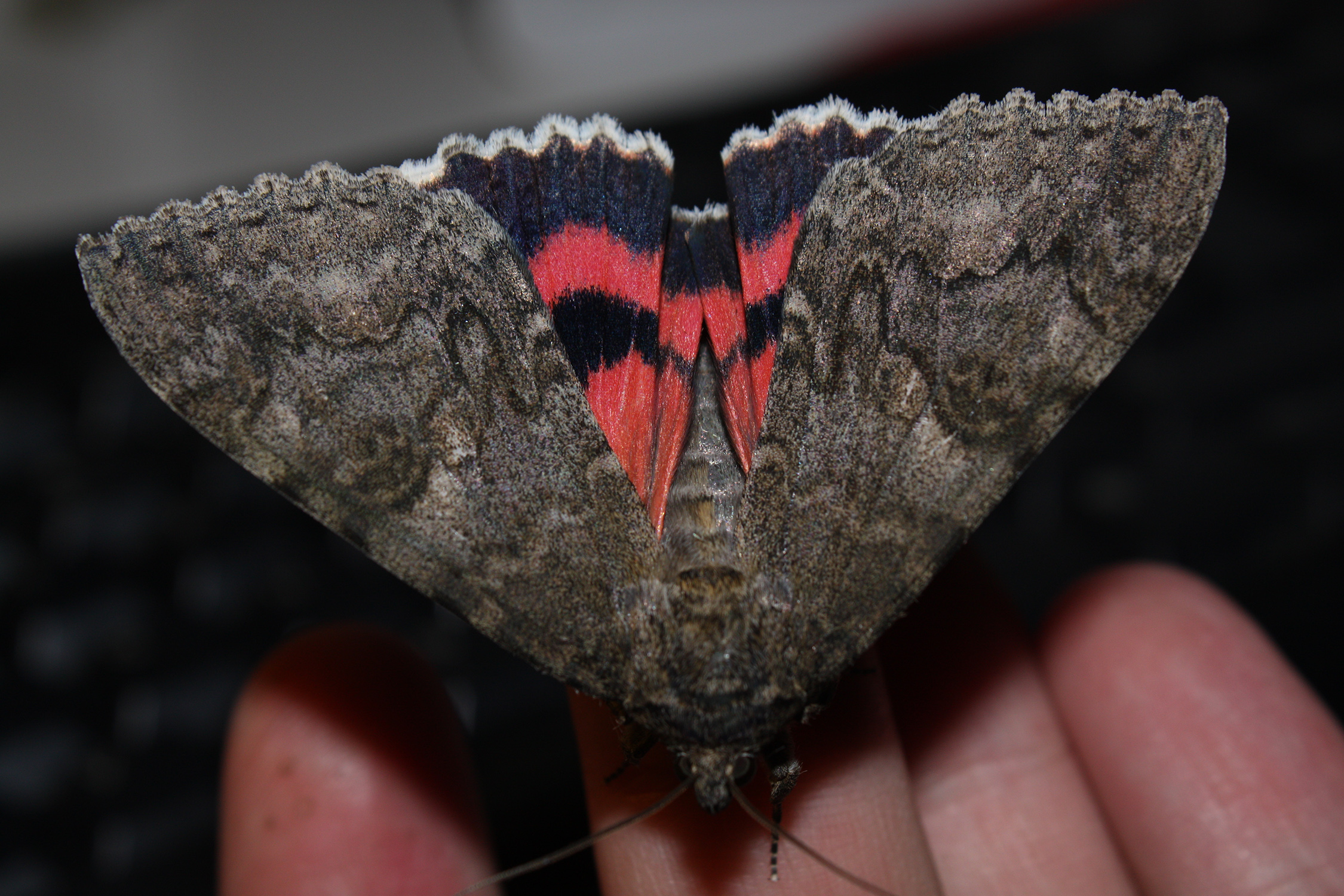
- Red underwing (Catocala nupta)

Scientific classification
- Kingdom: Animalia
- Phylum: Arthropoda
- Class: Insecta
- Order: Lepidoptera
- Superfamily: Noctuoidea
- Family: Erebidae
- Subfamily: Erebinae; Leach, [1815]

= Erebinae =

Subfamily of moths

The Erebinae are a subfamily of moths in the family Erebidae erected by William Elford Leach in 1815. Erebine moths are found on all continents except Antarctica, but reach their greatest diversity in the tropics. While the exact number of species belonging to the Erebinae is not known, the subfamily is estimated to include around 10,000 species. Some well-known Erebinae include underwing moths (Catocala) and witch moths (Thermesiini). Many of the species in the subfamily have medium to large wingspans (7 to 10 cm, 3 to 4 inches), up to nearly 30 cm in the white witch moth (Thysania agrippina), which has the widest wingspan of all Lepidoptera. Erebine caterpillars feed on a broad range of plants; many species feed on grasses and legumes, and a few are pests of castor bean, sugarcane, rice, as well as pistachios and blackberries.

== Morphology ==
Erebine moths possess a number of adaptations for predator defense. Most Erebinae, such as Zale have mottled, drably colored forewings and hindwings to better blend in with grass and tree trunks. In some Erebinae, such as Catocala, cryptically colored forewings conceal brightly colored hindwings which are suddenly revealed when the moth is disturbed from rest. The sudden exposure of these bright colors is thought to startle vertebrate predators, giving the moths extra time to escape. Like other Noctuoidea, erebine moths can detect the calls of echolocating bats or other approaching predators using hearing organs (tympana), which are among the most sensitive in the superfamily.

== Taxonomy ==
Prior to recent phylogenetic studies on the superfamily Noctuoidea, most Erebinae were classified within the noctuid subfamily Catocalinae, on the basis of a classification proposed by George Hampson at the start of the 20th century. Based on mounting evidence from molecular phylogenetic studies, Michael Fibiger and J. Donald Lafontaine transferred Erebinae and relatives from the Noctuidae to the Erebidae, and reinstated Erebinae as a subfamily. Later, Catocalinae was synonymized with Erebinae in the classifications proposed by Lafontaine and Christian Schmidt and Zahiri et al. A historical summary of the systematics of this group is provided by Jeremy Daniel Holloway, and a more detailed review of Erebinae taxonomy can be found in Nicholas T. Homziak et al. The most recent study by Zahriri et al. forms the basis for the current definition of the Erebinae. On the basis of consistent molecular support, Zahiri et al. identified several potential morphological synapomorphies for the subfamily: proboscis with smooth apex and sensilla styloconica dorsally, modified seventh abdominal sternite in the female, divided in to two lobes surrounding the ostium bursae (female copulatory opening). In the larvae, dorsolateral tubercles on segment A8, and pupae often with waxy bloom. Within the Erebinae, Zahiri et al. recognized the following 19 tribes:

== Tribes ==
- Acantholipini
- Audeini
- Catephiini
- Catocalini
- Cocytiini
- Ercheiini
- Erebini
- Euclidiini
- Hulodini
- Hypopyrini
- Melipotini
- Ommatophorini
- Omopterini
- Ophiusini
- Pandesmini
- Pericymini
- Poaphilini
- Sypnini
- Thermesiini
- Incertae sedis
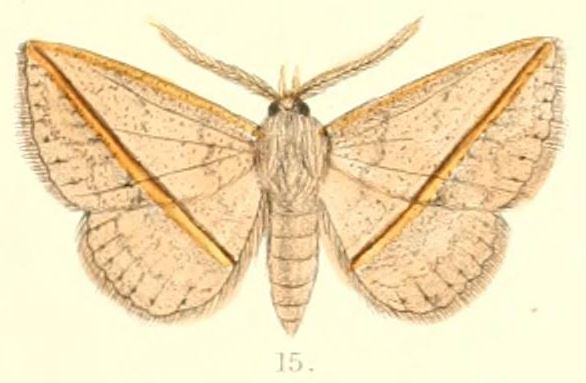
Acantholipini: Ugia transversa

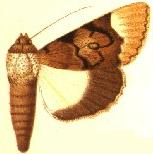
Audeini: Audea hypostigmata

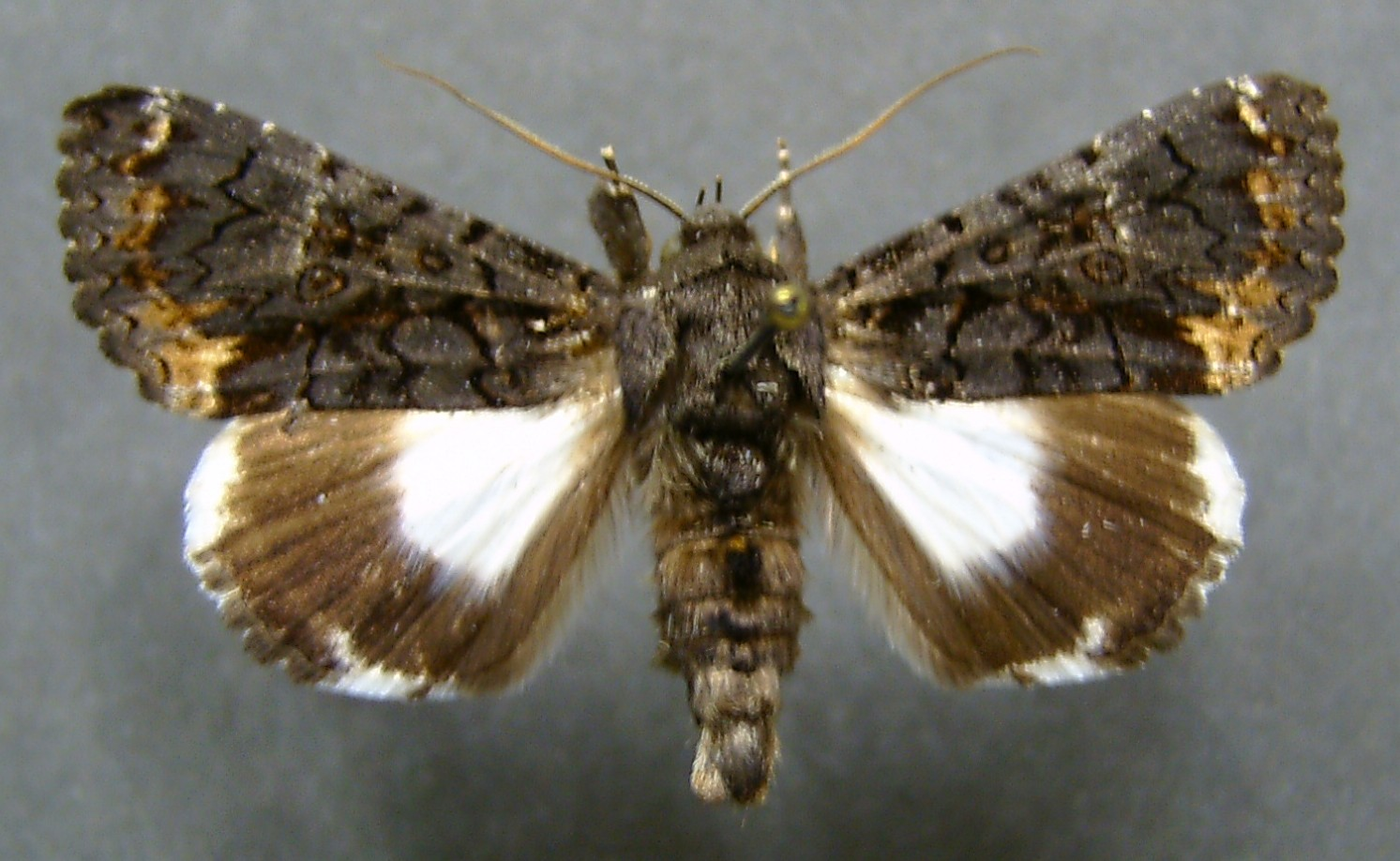
Catephiini: Catephia alchymista

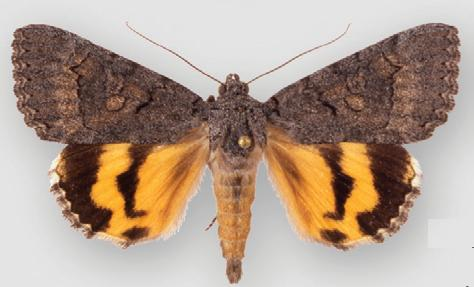
Catocalini: Catocala chelidonia

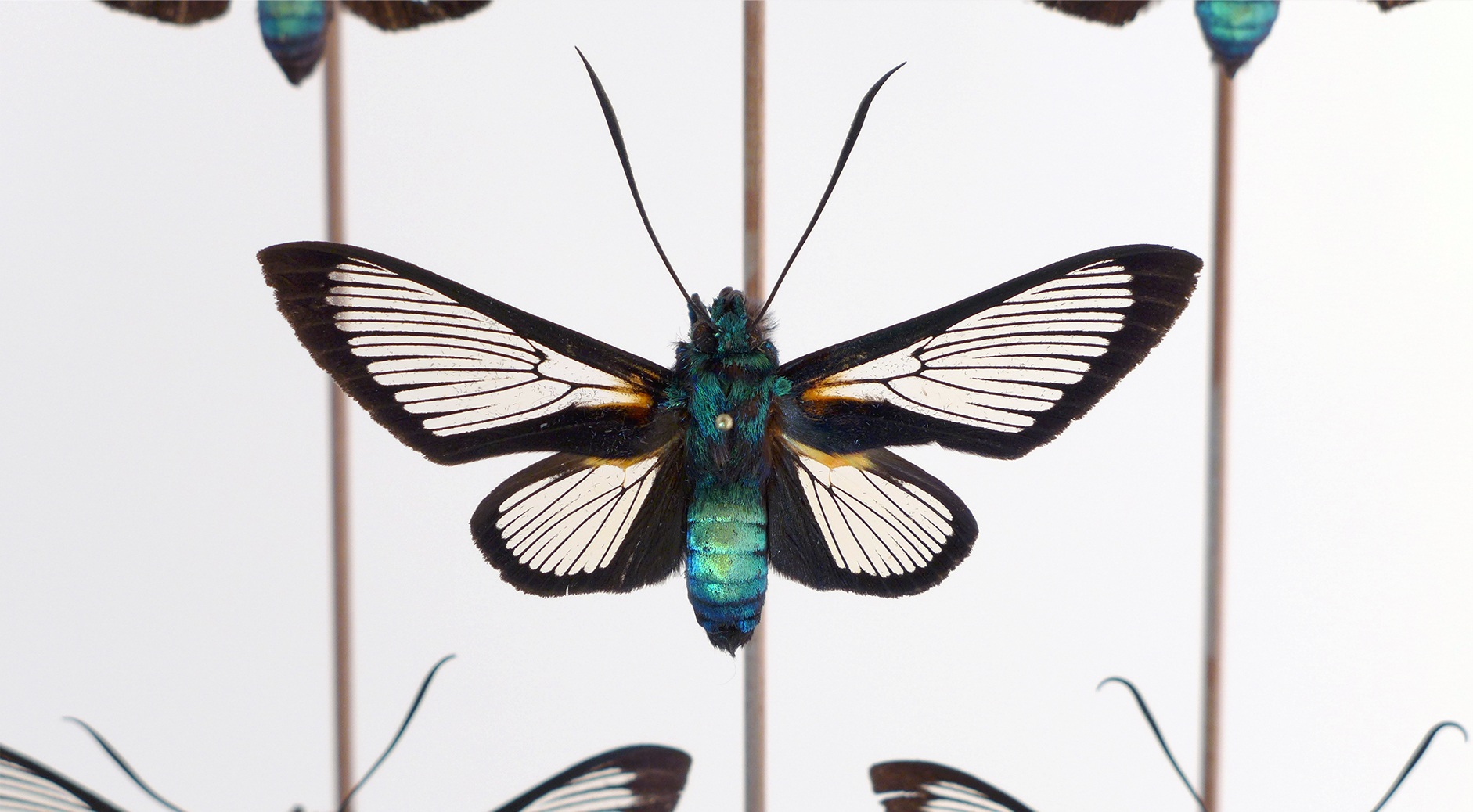
Cocytiini: Cocytia durvillii

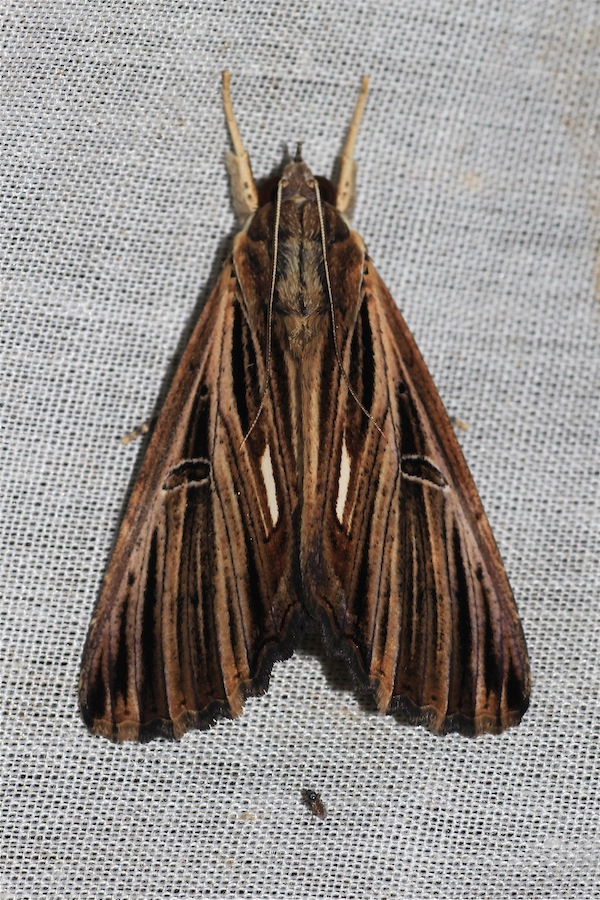
Ercheiini: Ercheia multilinea

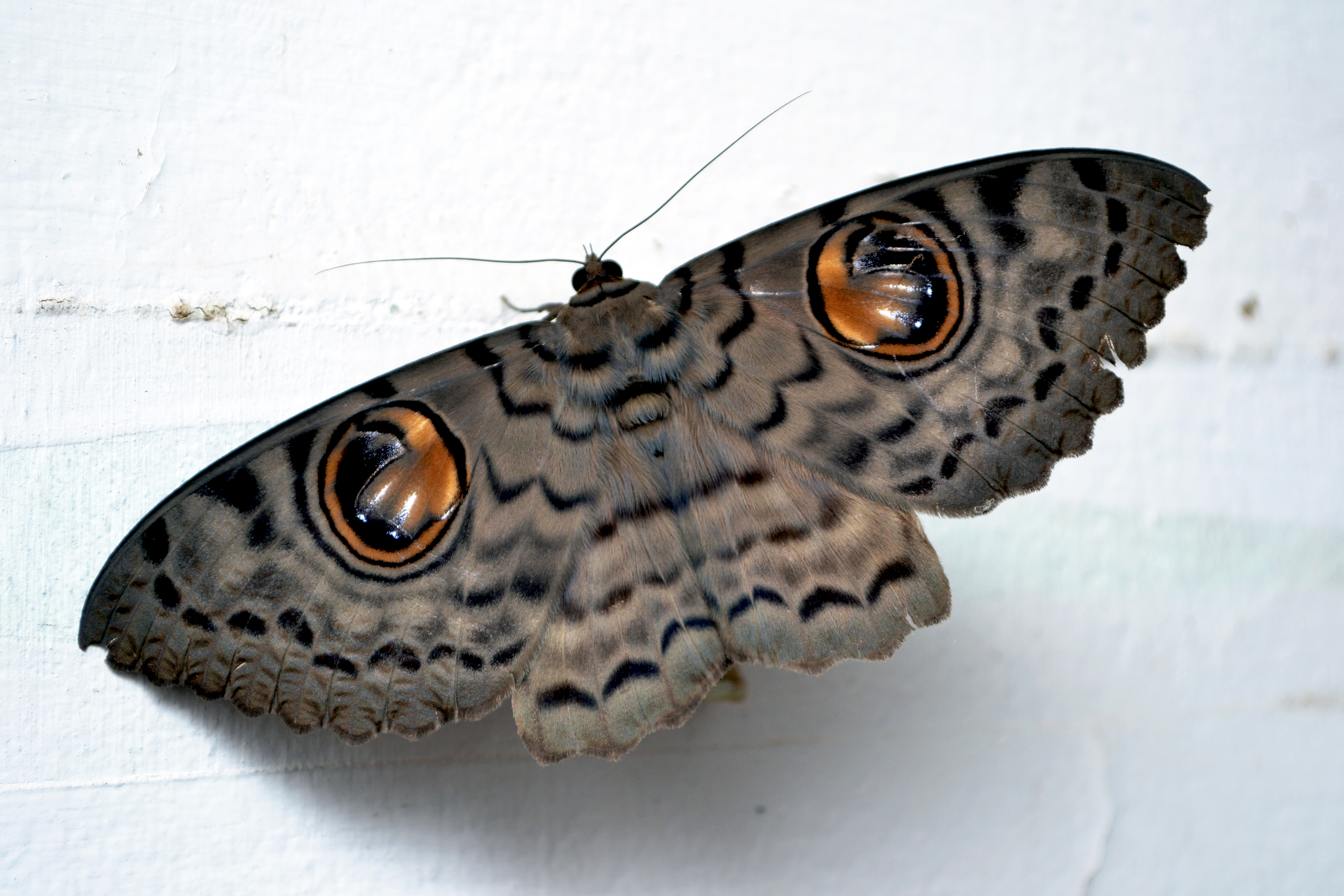
Erebini: Erebus macrops

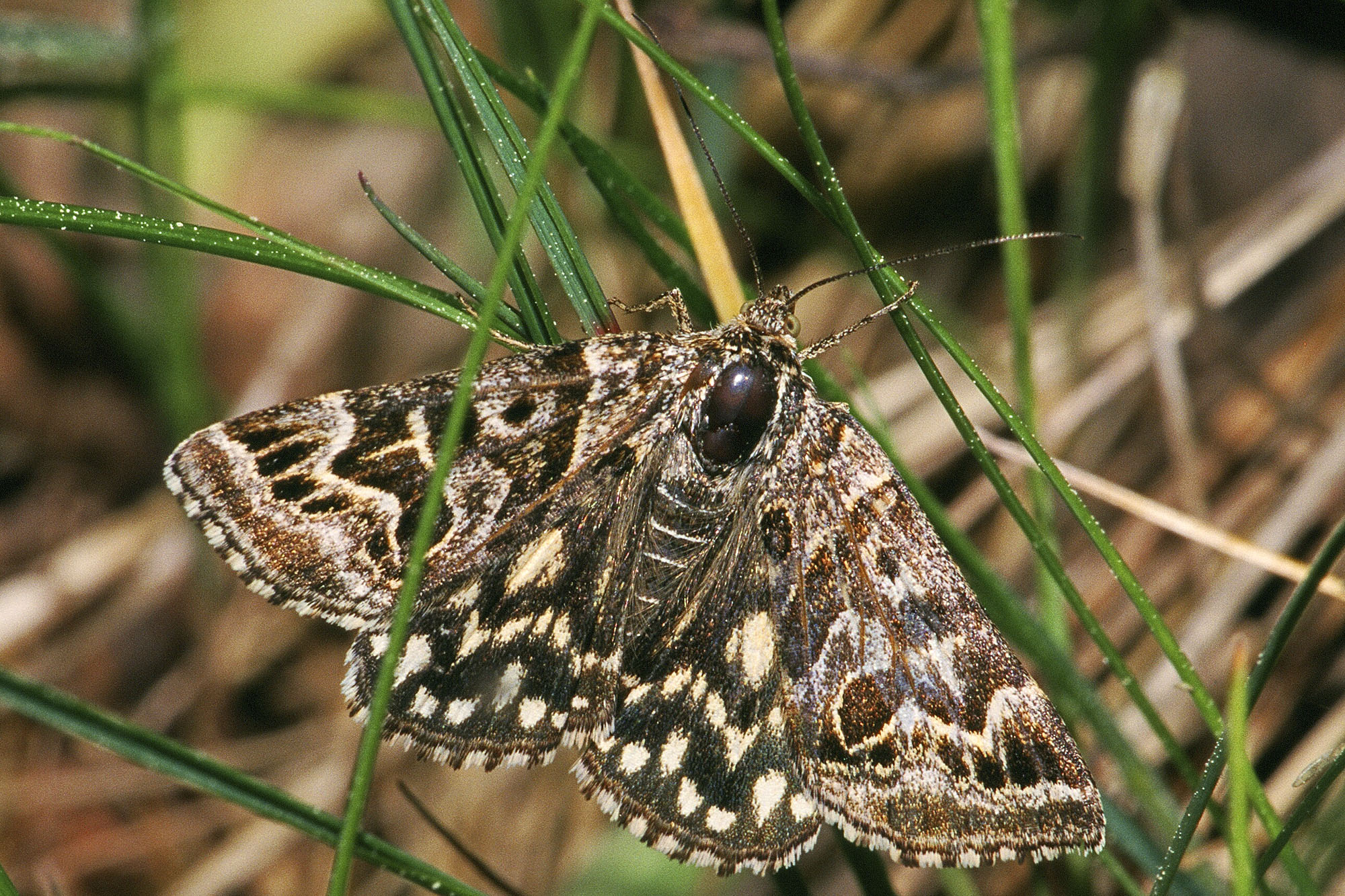
Euclidiini: Callistege mi

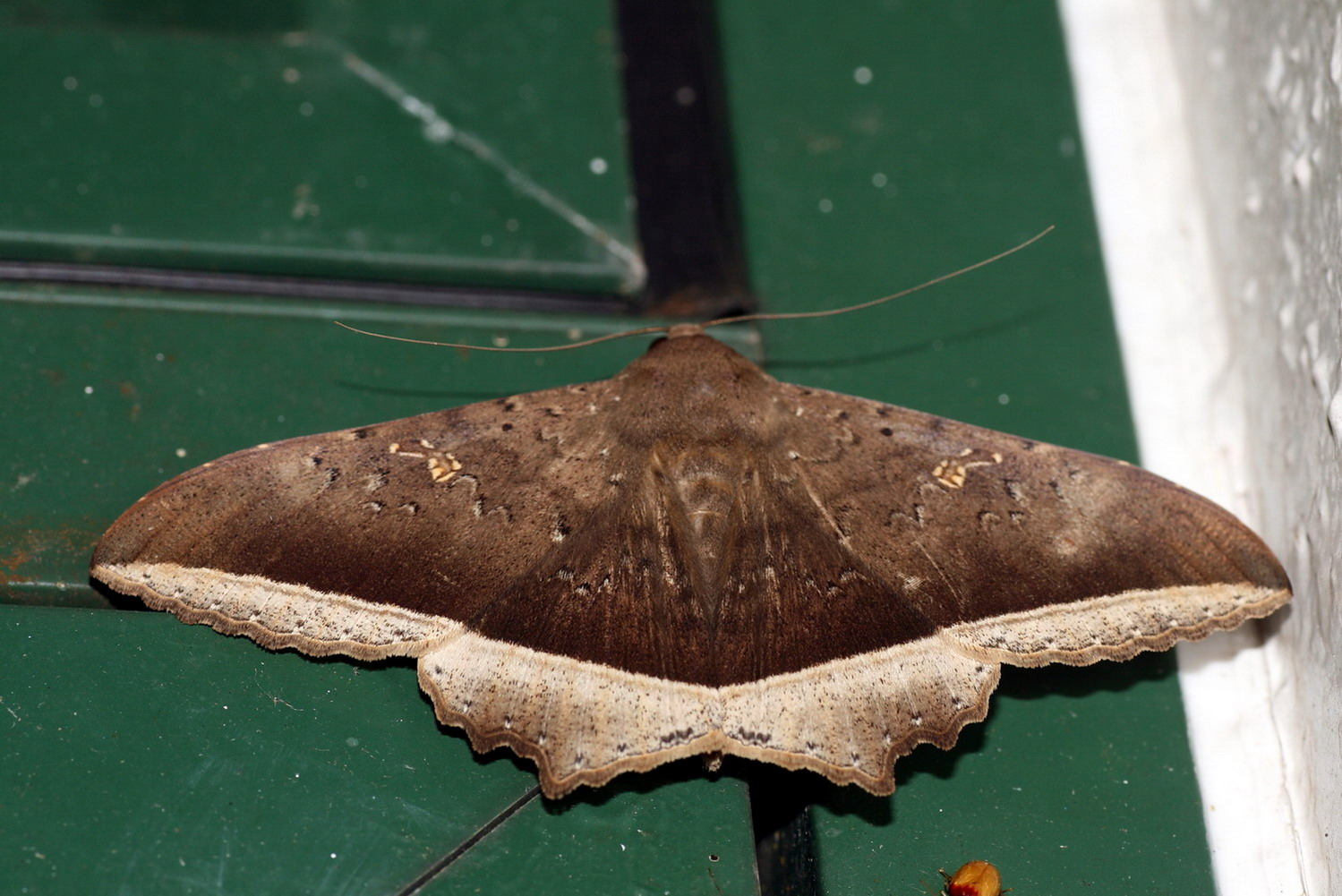
Hulodini: Hulodes caranea

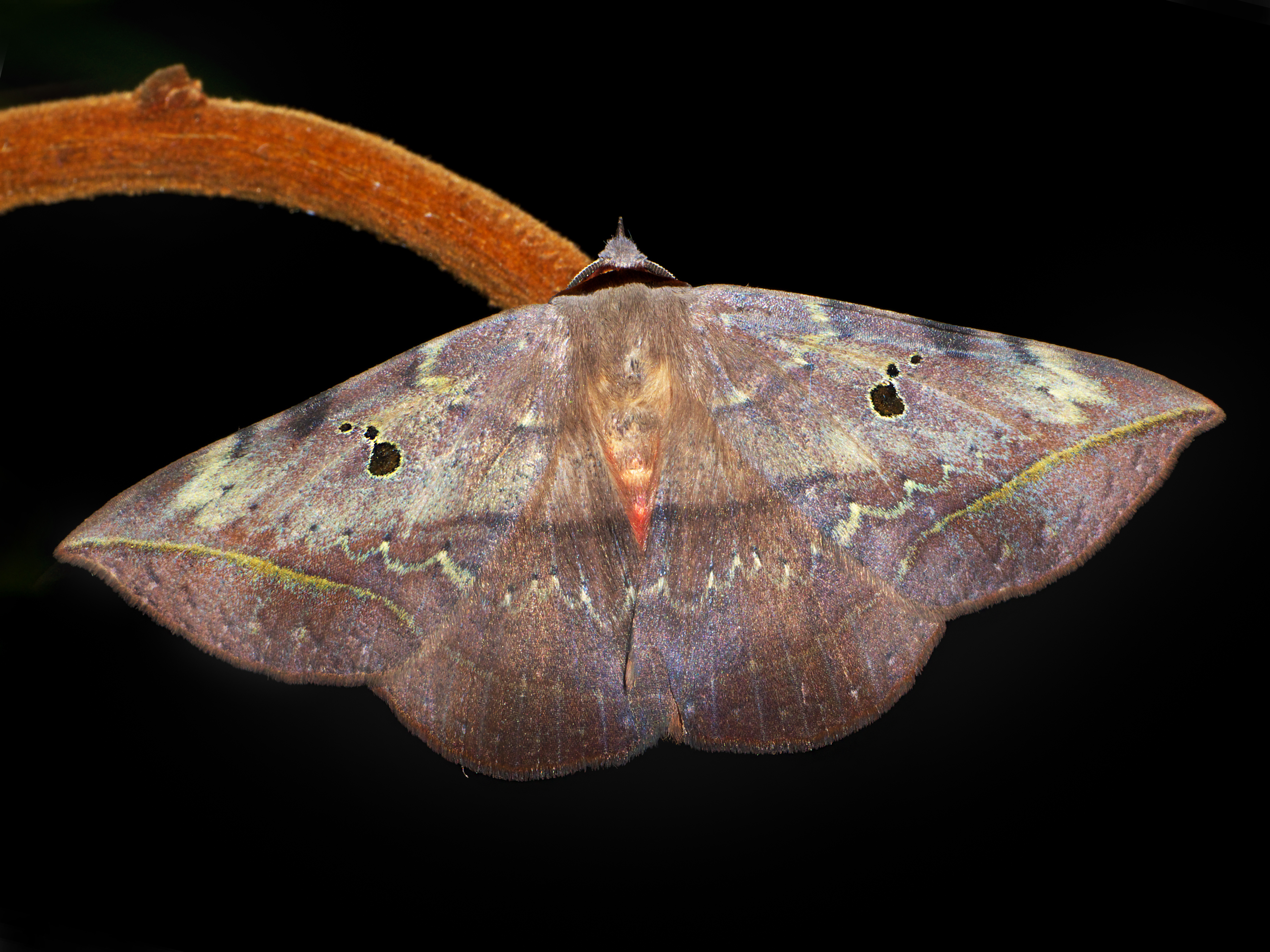
Hypopyrini: Hypopyra capensis

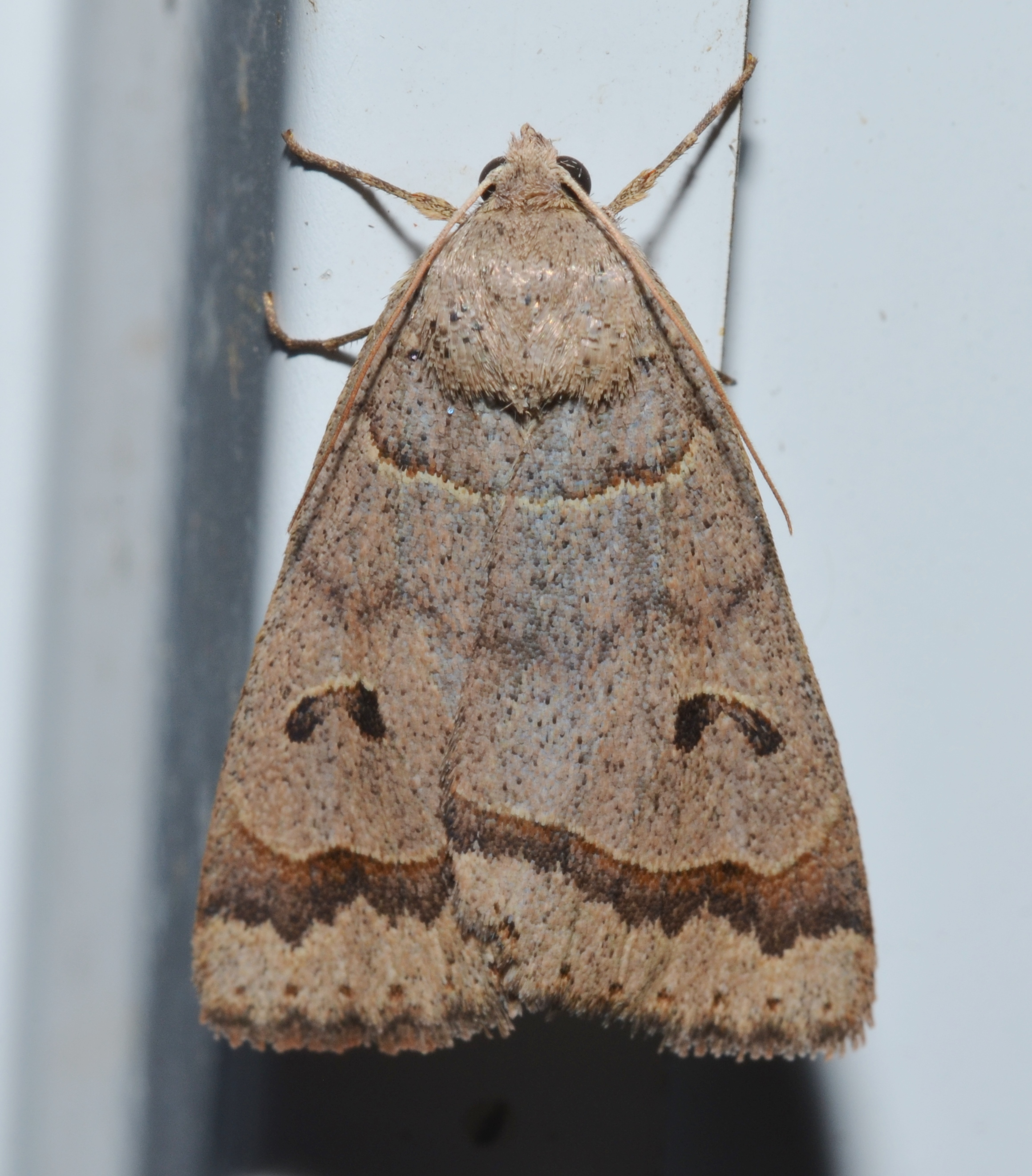
Melipotini: Phoberia atomaris

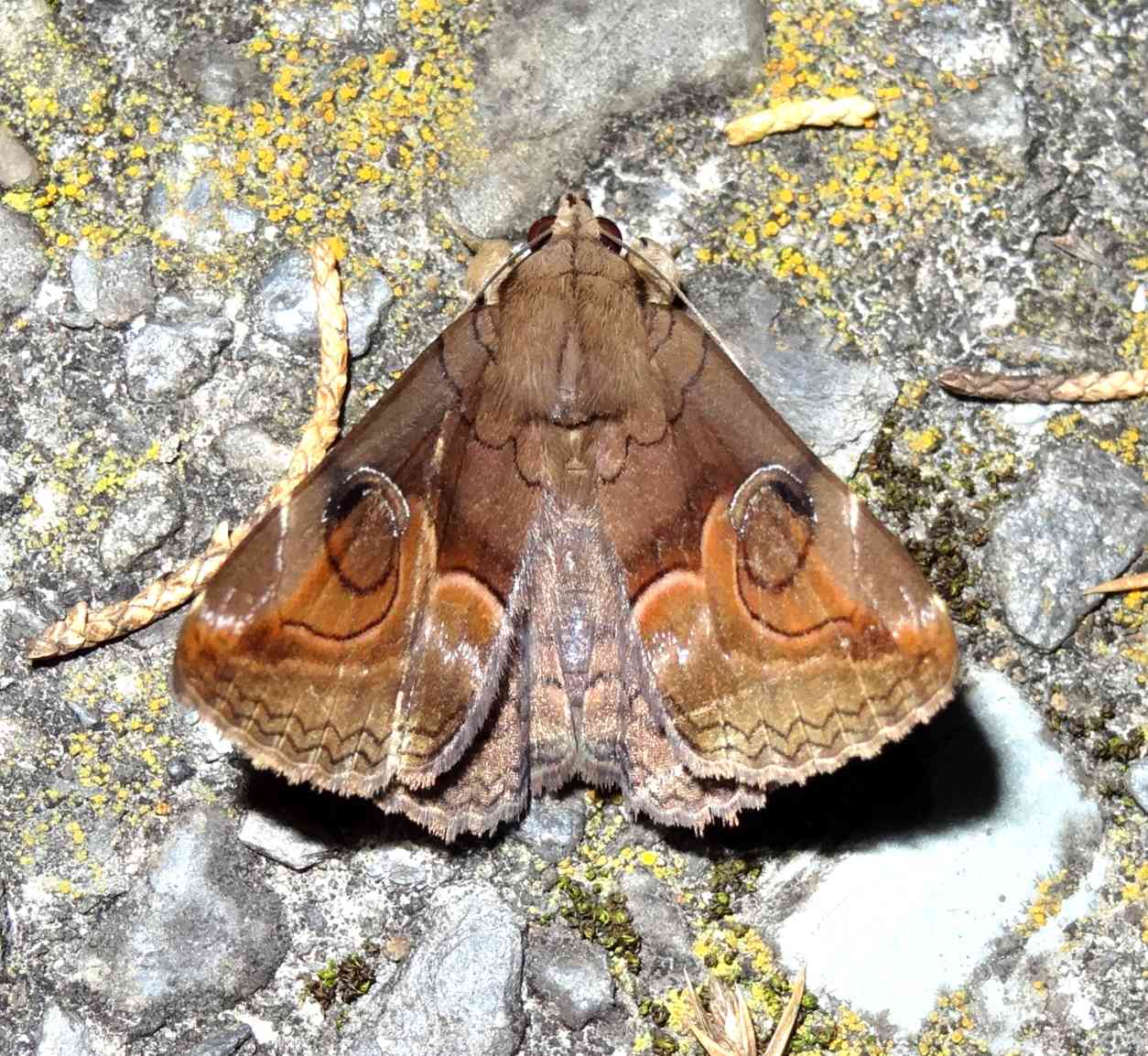
Ommatophorini: Ommatophora luminosa

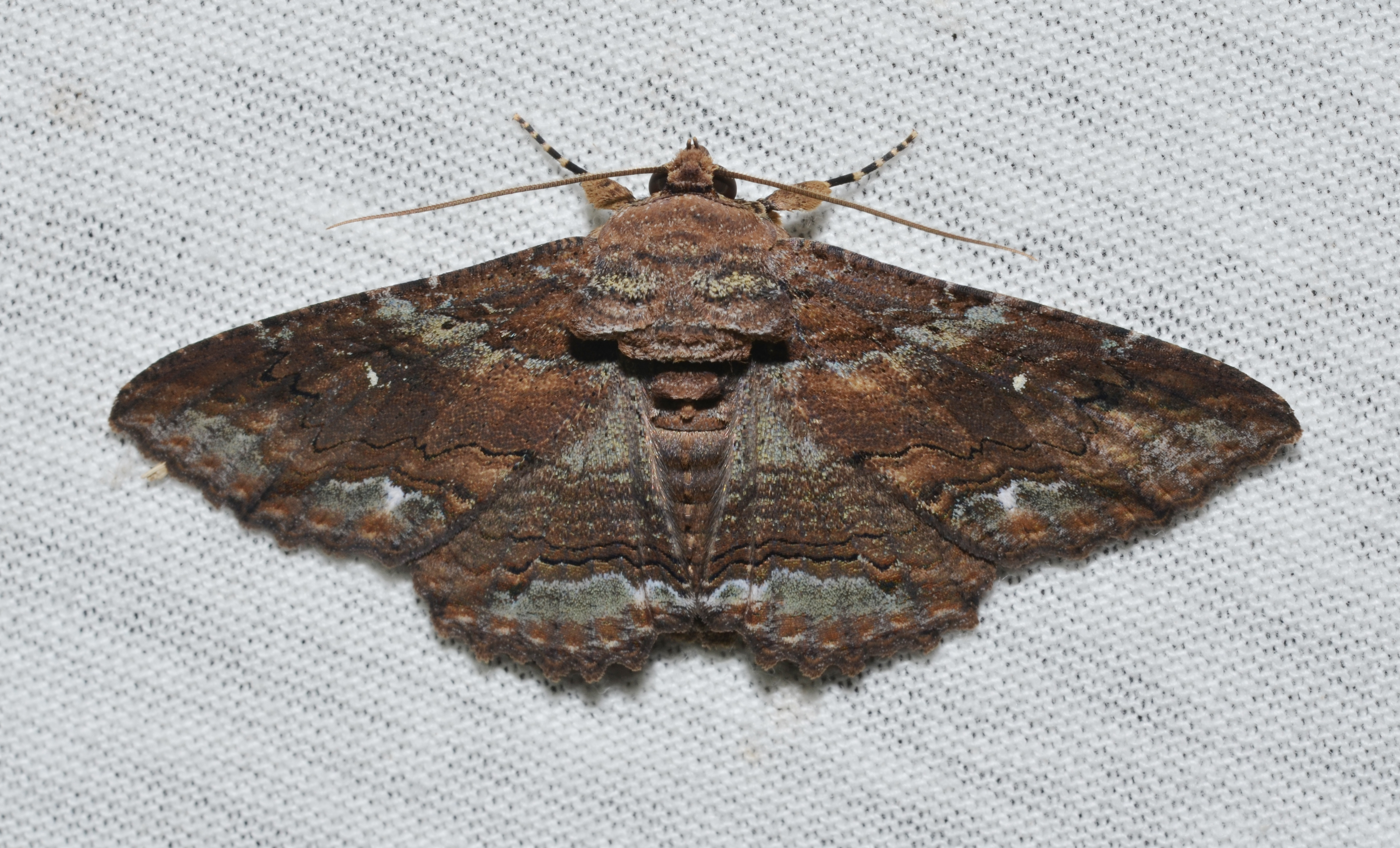
Omopterini: Zale lunata

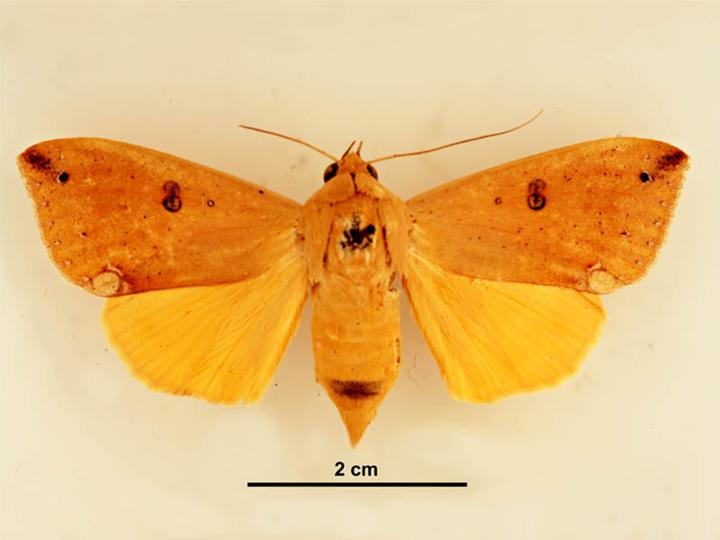
Ophiusini: Ophiusa discriminans

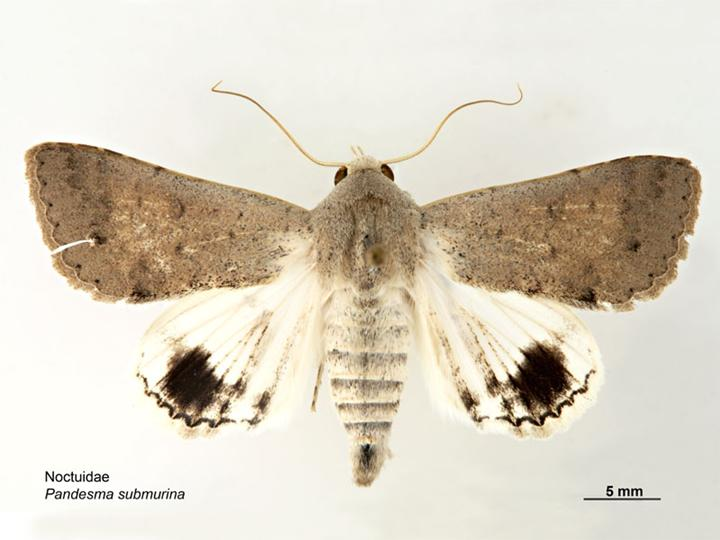
Pandesmini: Pandesma submurina

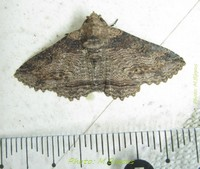
Pericymini: Pericyma mendax

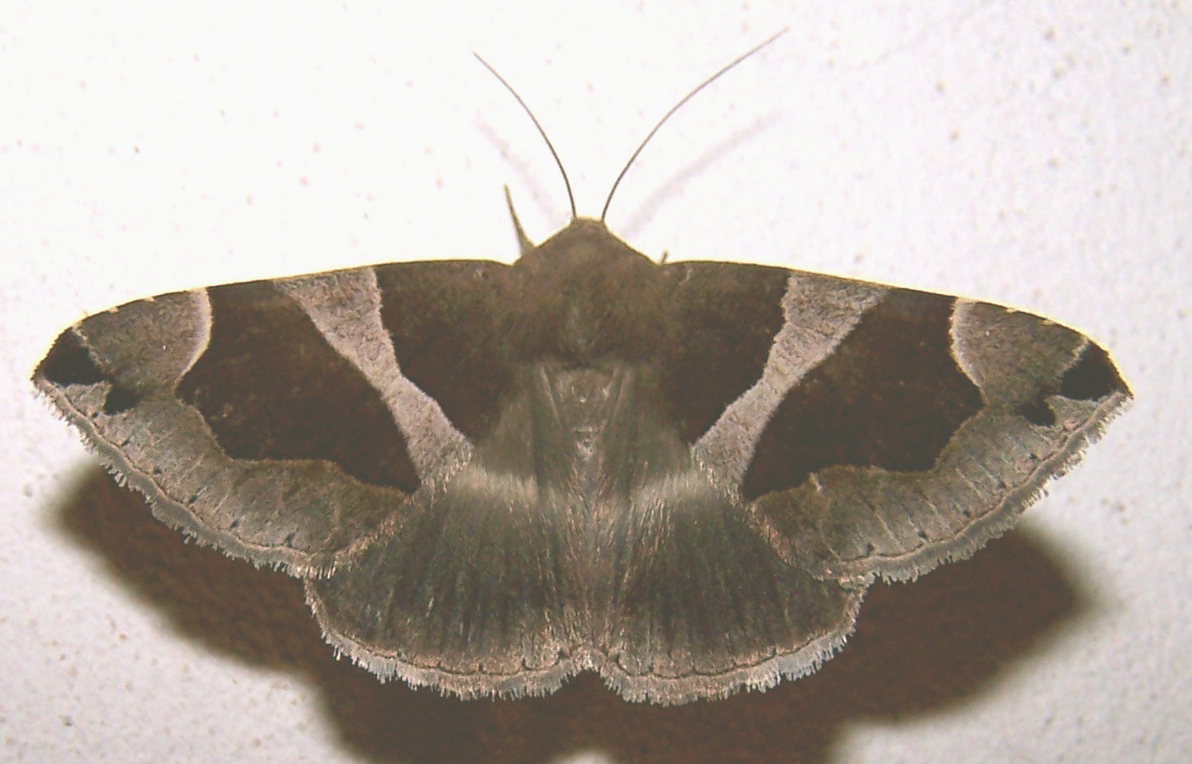
Poaphilini: Dysgonia algira

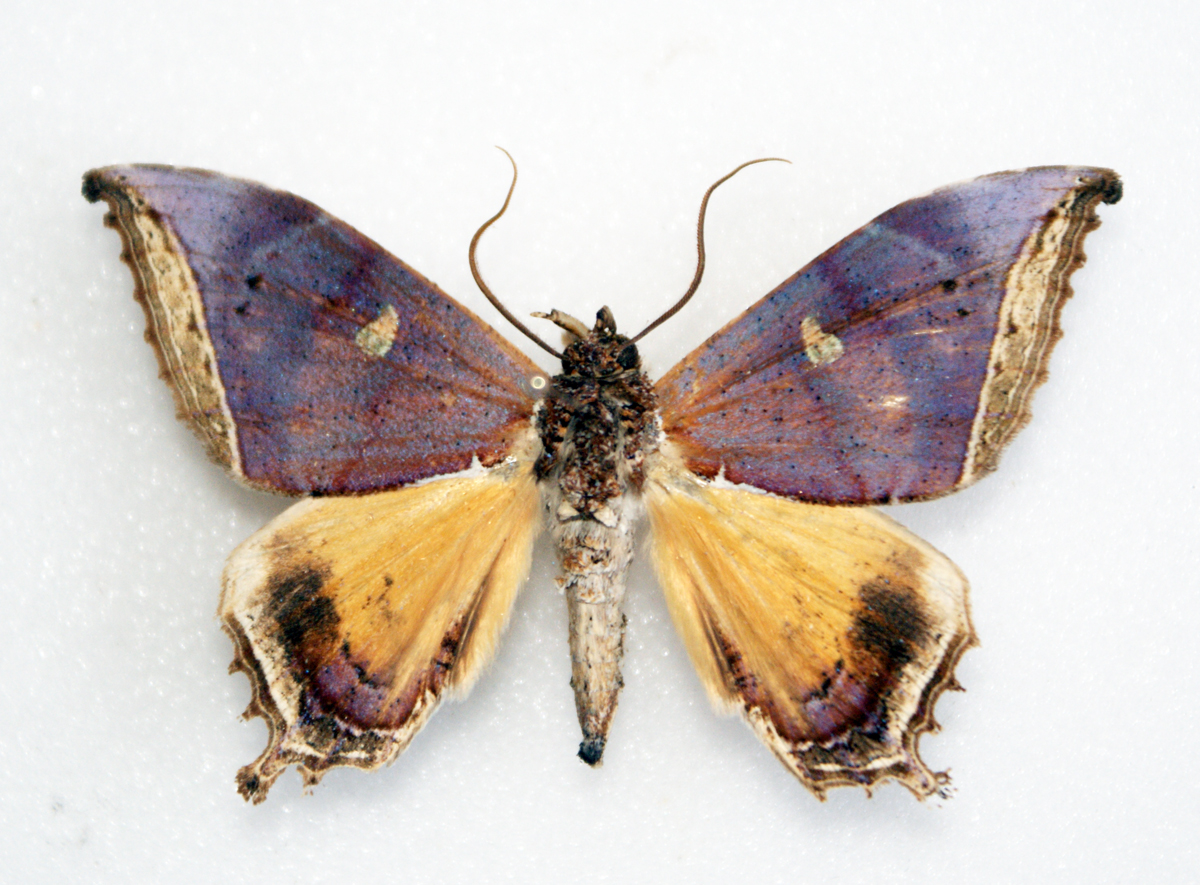
Sypnini: Pterocyclophora huntei

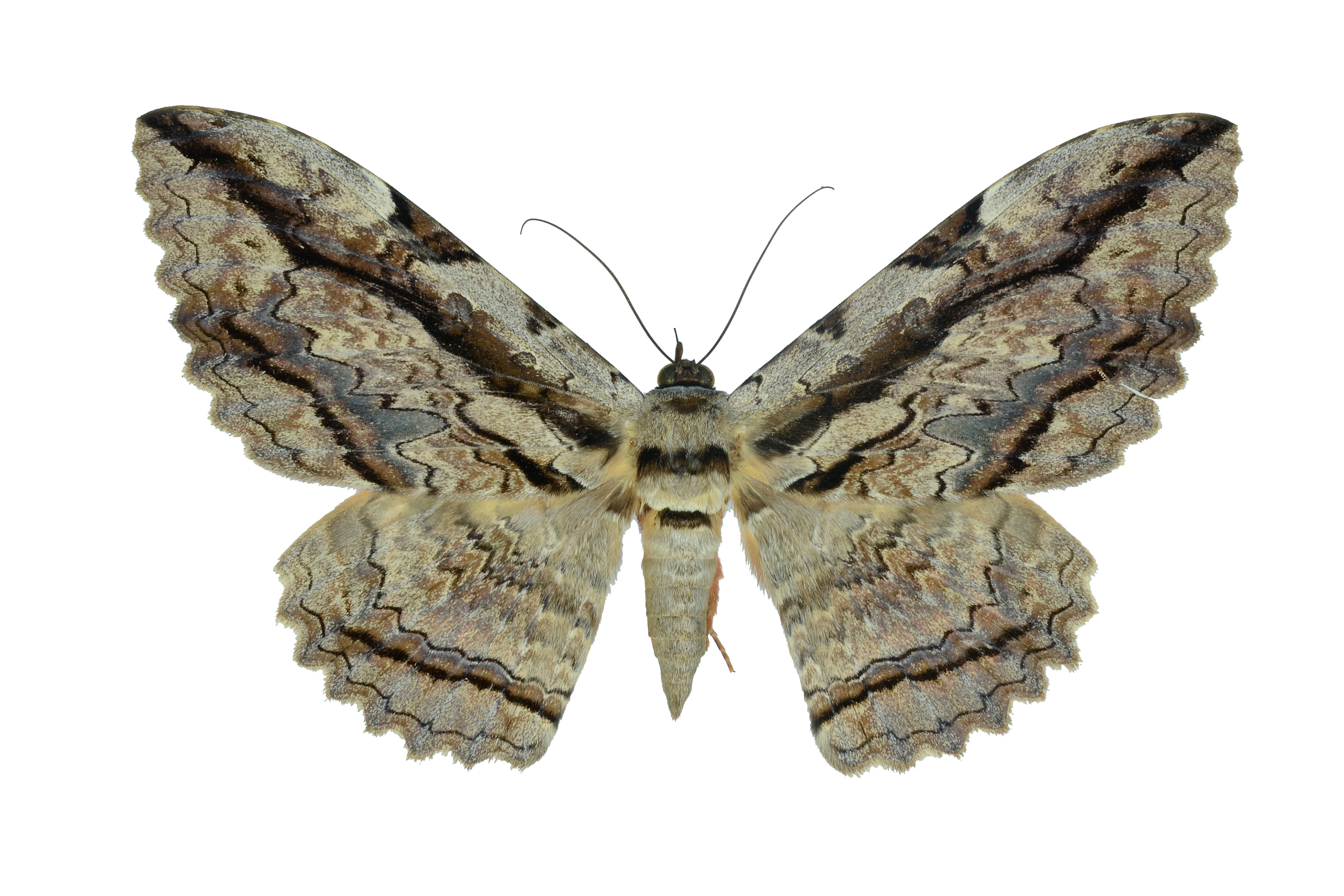
Thermesiini: Thysania zenobia

Genera with tribe not available:

- Honeyia
