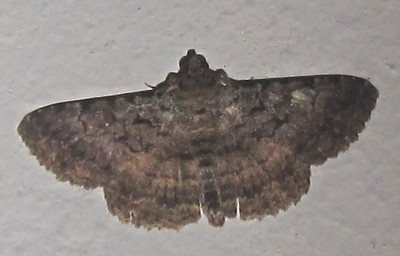

Scientific classification
- Domain: Eukaryota
- Kingdom: Animalia
- Phylum: Arthropoda
- Class: Insecta
- Order: Lepidoptera
- Superfamily: Noctuoidea
- Family: Erebidae
- Genus: Polydesma
- Species: P. umbricola

Binomial name
- Polydesma umbricola Boisduval, 1833

Synonyms
- Coenipeta collutrix Geyer, 1837; Polydesma landula Guenée, 1852; Polydesma determinata Wallengren, 1865

= Polydesma umbricola =

Monkeypod moth

Species of moth

Polydesma umbricola, the monkeypod moth or large tabby, is a species of moth in the family Erebidae. The species is found in southern Europe, Africa, Asia Minor to southern Asia, of India, Sri Lanka, Maldives, the Andaman Islands, including many Indian Ocean islands, like Coëtivy Island, Aldabra, Assumption Island, Madagascar and on Hawaii.

A similar species, Polydesma boarmoides, lives in South-East Asia.

== Description ==
Its wingspan is about 50 mm. Antennae of male minutely ciliated. Palpi with short third joint. Male with sub-basal area of hindwings clothed with long silky hair ventrally. Body brown suffused with fuscous color. Forewings with indistinct waved sub-basal, antemedial, medial, and post-medial lines, each arising from a black spot on the costa. A crenulate pale sub-marginal line with some fuscous suffusion inside it. A marginal series of lunulate spots present. Hindwings with indistinct antemedial and medial sinuous line. A crenulate sub-marginal pale line with fuscous suffusion inside it. A marginal series of lunulate spots present. Ventral side with the area inside the crenulate submarginal line of both wings broadly suffused with fuscous.

== Ecology ==
The caterpillar is a serious defoliator of many plants across the world. Adults lay eggs near the tips of the terminal twigs. Newly emerged larvae feed on the tender leaves of the twigs. Six larval instars until pupa. Young larvae secrete silk threads from spinnerets and suspended themselves from twigs by them. This habit, and the discharge of a fluid from a saclike, eversible gland are the only known defense strategies. Pupation usually found within bark cracks and crevices. Older larvae and adults are nocturnal.

Larvae are known to feed on plants like Albizia lebbeck, Pithecollobium dulce, Albizia saman, Acacia, Rosa and Salix.
