= Zethes (moth) =

Scientific classification
- Kingdom: Animalia
- Phylum: Arthropoda
- Class: Insecta
- Order: Lepidoptera
- Superfamily: Noctuoidea
- Family: Erebidae
- Tribe: Pericymini
- Genus: Zethes; Rambur, 1833

Genus of moths

Zethes is a genus of moths in the family Erebidae first described by Rambur in 1833.

== Description ==
Palpi thickly scaled, where the second joint obliquely upturned to above vertex of head. Third joint usually long. Thorax and abdomen usually smoothly scaled. Tibia moderately hairy. Forewings with acute apex. Outer margin more or less angled at middle. Hindwings with vein 5 from below middle of discocellulars.

== Species ==
- Zethes brandti Janzon, 1977
- Zethes humilis Mabille, 1900 (from Madagascar)
- Zethes insularis Rambur, 1833 (Mediterranean, Near East, Armenia)
- Zethes monotonus Wiltshire, 1938
- Zethes narghisa Brandt, 1938
- Zethes nemea Brandt, 1938
- Zethes pistazina Weisert, 2001
- Zethes propinquus Christoph, 1885
- Zethes sagittula (von Heyden, 1891) (from Madagascar)
