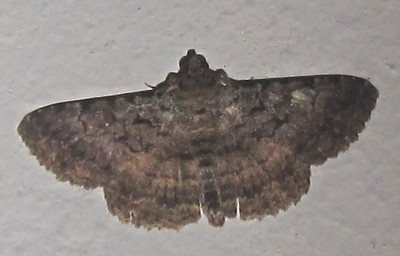

Scientific classification
- Domain: Eukaryota
- Kingdom: Animalia
- Phylum: Arthropoda
- Class: Insecta
- Order: Lepidoptera
- Superfamily: Noctuoidea
- Family: Erebidae
- Tribe: Pandesmini
- Genus: Polydesma; Boisduval, 1833

Synonyms
- Anthemoisia Blanchard, 1840; Anthemoessa Agassiz, [1847]; Anodapha Moore, [1885]; Trichopolydesma Berio, 1954

= Polydesma =

Genus of moths

Polydesma is a genus of moths in the family Erebidae erected by Jean Baptiste Boisduval in 1833.

== Description ==
Palpi upturned, where the second joint reaching vertex of head. Thorax smoothly scaled. Abdomen with slight basal ridges and tuft of hair. Tibia spineless and more or less hairy. Forewings with somewhat rounded apex. Hindwings with vein 5 arise from above angle of cell. Larva with four pairs of abdominal prolegs, where the first two pairs are rudimentary.

== Species ==
- Polydesma boarmoides Guenée, 1852 Uganda, South Africa, Indo-Australian Region, Fiji, New Caledonia, Hawaii
- Polydesma collusoria (Berio, 1954) Sierra Leone, Ivory Coast, Nigeria, Cameroon, Zaire, Uganda, Ethiopia, Kenya, Tanzania
- Polydesma erubescens Walker, 1865 Sri Lanka
- Polydesma hildebrandti Viette, 1967 Madagascar
- Polydesma scriptilis Guenée, 1852 Eritrea, Somalia, Namibia, Bangladesh, East Indies
- Polydesma umbricola Boisduval, 1833 Mauritania, Sierra Leone, the Gambia, Burkina Faso, Ivory Coast, Nigeria, Niger, Cameroon, Congo, Zaire, Angola, Arabia, Egypt, Sudan, Eritrea, Ethiopia, Somalia, Kenya, Malawi, Tanzania, Zambia, Zimbabwe, Mozambique, Eswatini, South Africa, Comoros, Madagascar, Mauritius, India, Sri Lanka, Myanmar, Vietnam, New Caledonia, Australia, Hawaii
