= Calyptis =

Scientific classification
- Kingdom: Animalia
- Phylum: Arthropoda
- Class: Insecta
- Order: Lepidoptera
- Superfamily: Noctuoidea
- Family: Erebidae
- Tribe: Ommatophorini
- Genus: Calyptis; Guenée, 1852

Genus of moths

Calyptis is a genus of moths in the family Erebidae.

== Species ==
- Calyptis idonea Stoll, 1780
- Calyptis iter Guenée, 1852
- Calyptis semicuprea Walker, 1857
