= Anophiodes =

Scientific classification
- Kingdom: Animalia
- Phylum: Arthropoda
- Class: Insecta
- Order: Lepidoptera
- Superfamily: Noctuoidea
- Family: Erebidae
- Tribe: Ercheiini
- Genus: Anophiodes; Hampson, 1913

Synonyms
- Catephiodes Bethune-Baker, 1908 (preocc. Hampson, 1905)

Genus of moths

Anophiodes is a genus of moths of the family Erebidae first described by George Hampson in 1913.

== Species ==
- Anophiodes concentratus Warren, 1914
- Anophiodes indistinctus Prout, 1922
- Anophiodes meeki (Bethune-Baker, 1908)
- Anophiodes pulchrilinea Wileman & West, 1929
