= Ugiodes =

Scientific classification
- Kingdom: Animalia
- Phylum: Arthropoda
- Class: Insecta
- Order: Lepidoptera
- Superfamily: Noctuoidea
- Family: Erebidae
- Tribe: Acantholipini
- Genus: Ugiodes; Hampson, 1926

Genus of moths

Ugiodes is a genus of moths in the family Erebidae.

== Species ==
- Ugiodes cinerea Hampson, 1926
- Ugiodes vagulalis Viette, 1956

== Former species ==
- Ugiodes geometriformis Strand, 1915
