= Ugiodes vagulalis =

Scientific classification
- Kingdom: Animalia
- Phylum: Arthropoda
- Class: Insecta
- Order: Lepidoptera
- Superfamily: Noctuoidea
- Family: Erebidae
- Genus: Ugiodes
- Species: U. vagulalis

Binomial name
- Ugiodes vagulalis Viette, 1956

Species of moth

Ugiodes vagulalis is a species of moth in the family Erebidae. It is found in Madagascar.
