= Anereuthina =

Scientific classification
- Kingdom: Animalia
- Phylum: Arthropoda
- Clade: Pancrustacea
- Class: Insecta
- Order: Lepidoptera
- Superfamily: Noctuoidea
- Family: Erebidae
- Tribe: Cocytiini
- Genus: Anereuthina; Hübner, 1823

Synonyms
- Hypaetra Guenée, 1852

Genus of moths

Anereuthina is a genus of moths in the family Erebidae.

== Description ==
Palpi upturned and met by a sharp frontal tuft, where the second joint reaching vertex of head and roughly scaled, and long and obliquely porrect (extending forward) third joint. Antennae usually minutely ciliated. Thorax and abdomen smoothly scaled. The fore tibia fringed with long hair in male. Mid tibia spined. Forewings with somewhat rounded apex.

== Species ==
- Anereuthina atriplaga (Walker, 1869)
- Anereuthina renosa Hübner, 1823

== Former species ==
- Anereuthina lilach (Guenée, 1852)
