= Anophiodes concentratus =

Scientific classification
- Domain: Eukaryota
- Kingdom: Animalia
- Phylum: Arthropoda
- Class: Insecta
- Order: Lepidoptera
- Superfamily: Noctuoidea
- Family: Erebidae
- Genus: Anophiodes
- Species: A. concentratus

Binomial name
- Anophiodes concentratus Warren, 1914

Synonyms
- Anophiodes concentrata

Species of moth

Anophiodes concentratus is a species of moth of the family Erebidae. It is found in Papua New Guinea.
