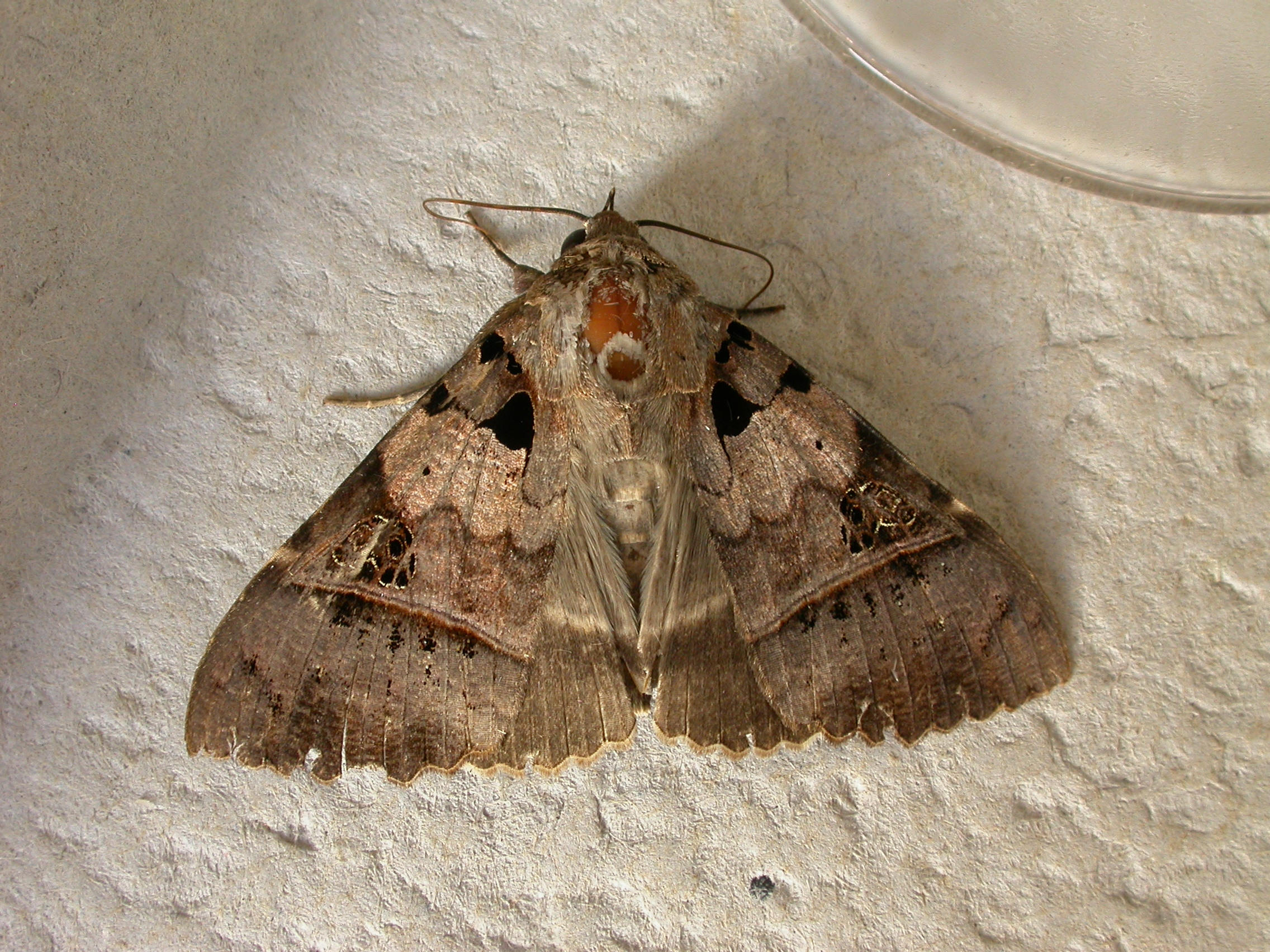

Scientific classification
- Kingdom: Animalia
- Phylum: Arthropoda
- Class: Insecta
- Order: Lepidoptera
- Superfamily: Noctuoidea
- Family: Erebidae
- Subfamily: Erebinae
- Tribe: Cocytiini; Boisduval, [1828]

= Cocytiini =

Tribe of moths

The Cocytiini are a tribe of moths in the family Erebidae. Adults of some members of the subfamily, especially in the genus Serrodes, have a proboscis capable of piercing fruit skins, allowing the moth to drink the fruit juice.

== Taxonomy ==
The tribe may be most closely related to the clade containing the tribes Poaphilini and Ophiusini, also within the Erebinae. Composition of the tribe Cocytiini was discussed in Homziak, Breinholt & Kawahara, 2016.

== Genera ==
- Anereuthina
- Avatha
- Cocytia
- Ophyx
- Serrodes
