= Catephiini =

Scientific classification
- Domain: Eukaryota
- Kingdom: Animalia
- Phylum: Arthropoda
- Class: Insecta
- Order: Lepidoptera
- Superfamily: Noctuoidea
- Family: Erebidae
- Subfamily: Erebinae
- Tribe: Catephiini; Guenée, 1854

Synonyms
- Catephidae Guenée, 1854

Tribe of moths

The Catephiini are a tribe of moths in the family Erebidae.

== Taxonomy ==
The tribe is most closely related to the tribe Omopterini, also within Erebinae, though the genera belonging to each tribe are not well determined.

== Genera ==
- Catephia
- Nagia
- Paranagia
