= Ugiodes cinerea =

Scientific classification
- Domain: Eukaryota
- Kingdom: Animalia
- Phylum: Arthropoda
- Class: Insecta
- Order: Lepidoptera
- Superfamily: Noctuoidea
- Family: Erebidae
- Genus: Ugiodes
- Species: U. cinerea

Binomial name
- Ugiodes cinerea Hampson, 1926

Ghanaian species of moth in the family Erebidae

Ugiodes cinerea is a species of moth in the family Erebidae. It is found in Ghana.
