= Anophiodes indistinctus =

Scientific classification
- Kingdom: Animalia
- Phylum: Arthropoda
- Clade: Pancrustacea
- Class: Insecta
- Order: Lepidoptera
- Superfamily: Noctuoidea
- Family: Erebidae
- Genus: Anophiodes
- Species: A. indistinctus

Binomial name
- Anophiodes indistinctus Prout, 1922

Synonyms
- Anophiodes indistincta

Species of moth

Anophiodes indistinctus is a species of moth of the family Erebidae. It is found in Indonesia on Seram.
