= Anophiodes pulchrilinea =

Scientific classification
- Domain: Eukaryota
- Kingdom: Animalia
- Phylum: Arthropoda
- Class: Insecta
- Order: Lepidoptera
- Superfamily: Noctuoidea
- Family: Erebidae
- Genus: Anophiodes
- Species: A. pulchrilinea

Binomial name
- Anophiodes pulchrilinea Wileman & West, 1929

Species of moth

Anophiodes pulchrilinea is a species of moth of the family Erebidae. It is found in the Philippines (Luzon).
