= Anereuthina renosa =

Scientific classification
- Kingdom: Animalia
- Phylum: Arthropoda
- Clade: Pancrustacea
- Class: Insecta
- Order: Lepidoptera
- Superfamily: Noctuoidea
- Family: Erebidae
- Genus: Anereuthina
- Species: A. renosa

Binomial name
- Anereuthina renosa Hübner, 1823

Synonyms
- Hypaetra lilach Guenée, 1852; Hypaetra occularia Swinhoe, 1890

Species of moth

Anereuthina renosa is a species of moth of the family Erebidae. It is found in Sundaland, the Philippines and Burma. The habitat consists of hill dipterocarp forests, lower montane forests and lowland forests.

The larvae feed on Elaeis species. Pupation takes place in a silken cocoon within a leaf.
