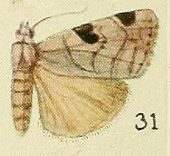
- Honeyia clearchus

Scientific classification
- Domain: Eukaryota
- Kingdom: Animalia
- Phylum: Arthropoda
- Class: Insecta
- Order: Lepidoptera
- Superfamily: Noctuoidea
- Family: Erebidae
- Subfamily: Erebinae
- Genus: Honeyia; Hacker & Fibiger, 2007

Type species
- Brevipecten clearchus Fawcett, 1916

= Honeyia =

Genus of moths

Honeyia is a genus of moths of the family Erebidae. The genus was erected by Hermann Heinrich Hacker and Michael Fibiger in 2007.

== Species ==
- Honeyia burmeisteri Hacker & Fibiger, 2007
- Honeyia clearchus (Fawcett, 1916)
- Honeyia dia (Viette, 1972)
- Honeyia quarta Hacker & Fibiger, 2007
- Honeyia secunda Hacker & Fibiger, 2007
- Honeyia tertia Hacker & Fibiger, 2007
