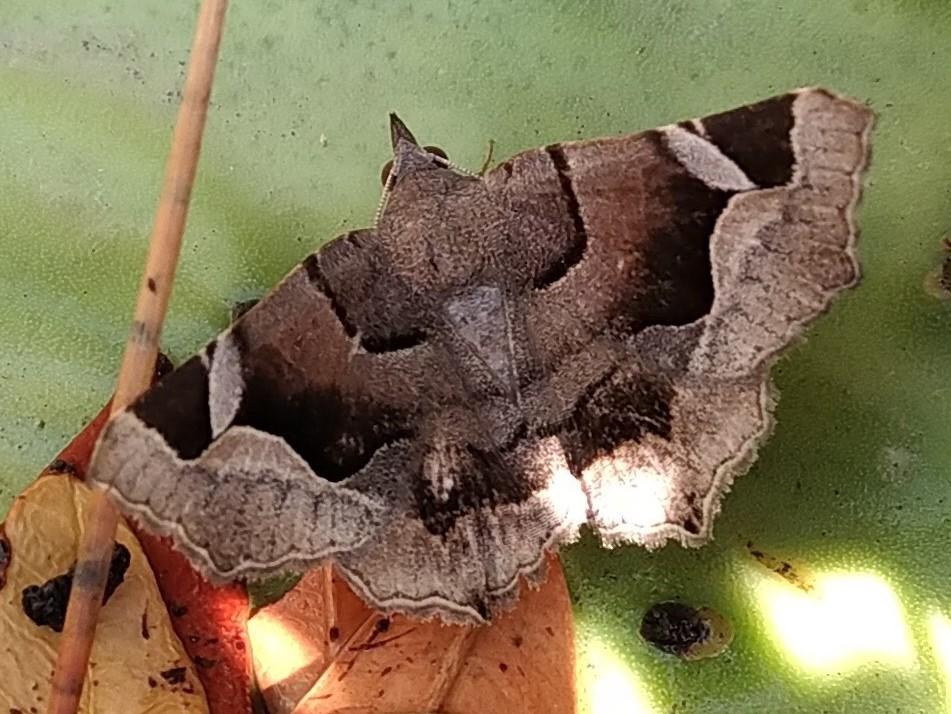

Scientific classification
- Kingdom: Animalia
- Phylum: Arthropoda
- Class: Insecta
- Order: Lepidoptera
- Superfamily: Noctuoidea
- Family: Erebidae
- Genus: Zethes
- Species: Z. insularis

Binomial name
- Zethes insularis Rambur, 1833

Synonyms
- Zethes natlyi; Zethes bruzzanaria

= Zethes insularis =

Species of moth

Zethes insularis is a species of moth in the family Erebidae first described by Jules Pierre Rambur in 1833. The species is found in the warmer parts of the Mediterranean area: Armenia and the Caucasus, Iraq, south-western Iran, Lebanon, Israel, Syria and Jordan.

Adults are on wing from March to October. There are several generations per year.
