= Anophiodes meeki =

Scientific classification
- Domain: Eukaryota
- Kingdom: Animalia
- Phylum: Arthropoda
- Class: Insecta
- Order: Lepidoptera
- Superfamily: Noctuoidea
- Family: Erebidae
- Genus: Anophiodes
- Species: A. meeki

Binomial name
- Anophiodes meeki (Bethune-Baker, 1908)

Synonyms
- Catephiodes meeki Bethune-Baker, 1908; Catephiodes meeci Hampson, 1913

Species of moth

Anophiodes meeki is a species of moth of the family Erebidae. It is found in Papua New Guinea.
