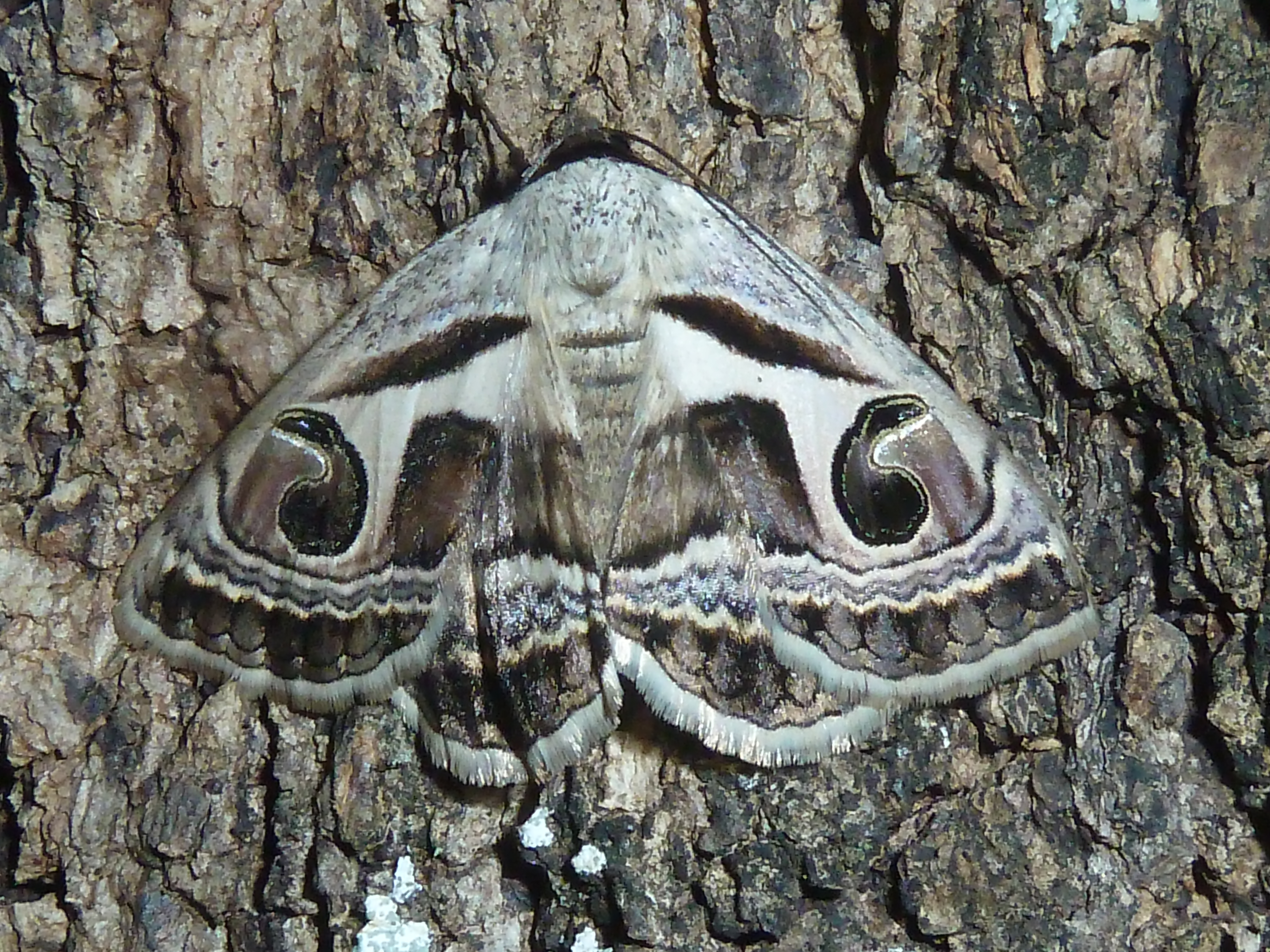

Scientific classification
- Kingdom: Animalia
- Phylum: Arthropoda
- Class: Insecta
- Order: Lepidoptera
- Superfamily: Noctuoidea
- Family: Erebidae
- Tribe: Hypopyrini
- Genus: Cometaster; Hampson, 1913
- Species: C. pyrula

Binomial name
- Cometaster pyrula (Hopffer, 1857)

Synonyms
- Generic: Spirama; Specific: Spirama pyrula Hopffer, 1858; Spirama lucidus Felder, 1874; Spirama lucida

= Cometaster =

Faint owl moth

Genus of moths

Cometaster is a monotypic moth genus of the family Erebidae erected by George Hampson in 1913. Its only species, Cometaster pyrula, the faint owl moth or ying-yang moth, was first described by Carl Heinrich Hopffer in 1857.

== Distribution ==
It is found in Eastern and Southern Africa, mainly in Botswana, the Democratic Republic of the Congo, Malawi, Mozambique, South Africa, Zambia and Zimbabwe.

== Biological control agent ==
In October 2004, as part of a biological control project, larvae of this moth from South Africa were released in Queensland, Australia, in order to keep under control the type of acacia Acacia nilotica subsp. indica, a major invasive species in the Mitchell Grass Downs.
