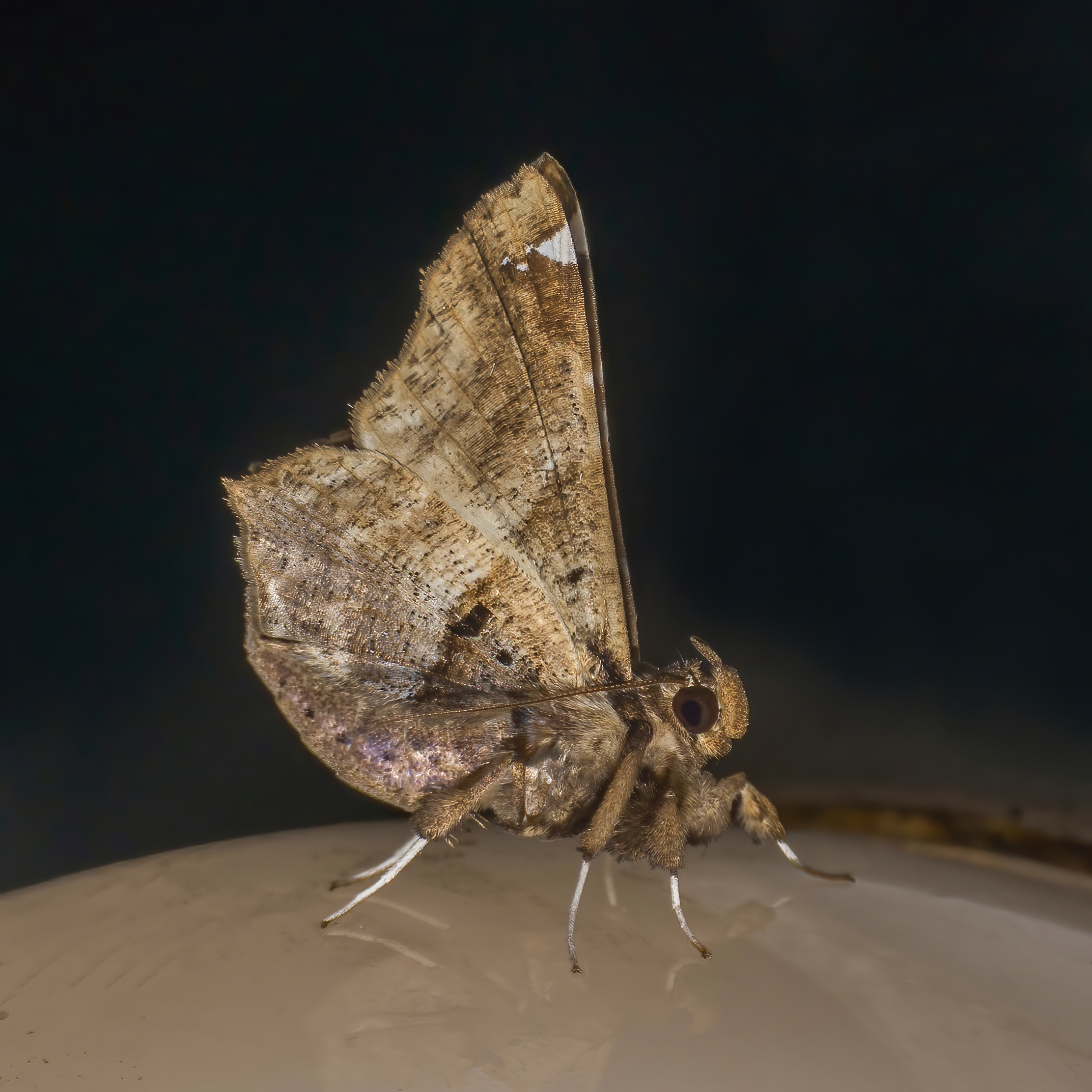
- Amphigonia cf. hepatizans Sinharaja Forest, Viharahena, Sri Lanka

Scientific classification
- Kingdom: Animalia
- Phylum: Arthropoda
- Class: Insecta
- Order: Lepidoptera
- Superfamily: Noctuoidea
- Family: Erebidae
- Genus: Amphigonia
- Species: A. hepatizans

Binomial name
- Amphigonia hepatizans Guenée, 1852

= Amphigonia hepatizans =

Species of moth

Amphigonia hepatizans is a moth of the family Noctuidae first described by Achille Guenée in 1852. It is found in the Indian subregion, Sri Lanka, Thailand, Andaman Islands, Sundaland and Sulawesi.

Adults have large forewings with acute margins which are distinctly angled centrally.
