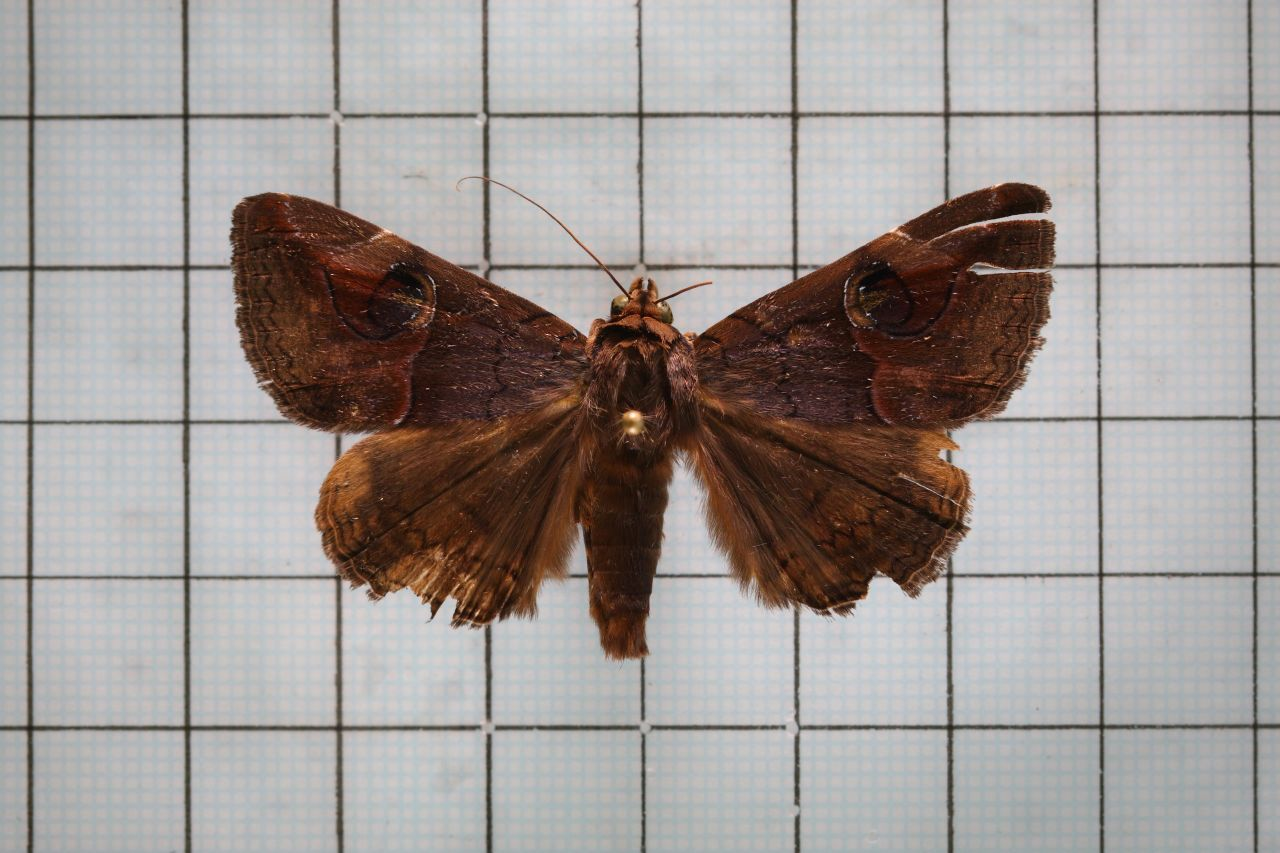
- Ommatophora luminosa

Scientific classification
- Domain: Eukaryota
- Kingdom: Animalia
- Phylum: Arthropoda
- Class: Insecta
- Order: Lepidoptera
- Superfamily: Noctuoidea
- Family: Erebidae
- Tribe: Ommatophorini
- Genus: Ommatophora; Guenee, 1852

= Ommatophora =

Genus of moths

Ommatophora is a genus of moths in the family Erebidae.

== Species ==
- Ommatophora burrowsi Prout, 1922
- Ommatophora fulvastra Guenee, 1852
- Ommatophora luminosa (Cramer, 1780)
