= Anereuthina atriplaga =

Scientific classification
- Kingdom: Animalia
- Phylum: Arthropoda
- Class: Insecta
- Order: Lepidoptera
- Superfamily: Noctuoidea
- Family: Erebidae
- Genus: Anereuthina
- Species: A. atriplaga

Binomial name
- Anereuthina atriplaga (Walker, 1869)

Synonyms
- Hypaetra atriplaga Walker, 1869

Species of moth

Anereuthina atriplaga is a species of moth of the family Erebidae. It is found in the Democratic Republic of the Congo.
