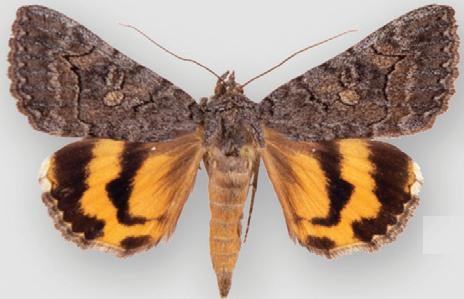
- Catocala chelidonia chelidonia

Scientific classification
- Kingdom: Animalia
- Phylum: Arthropoda
- Class: Insecta
- Order: Lepidoptera
- Superfamily: Noctuoidea
- Family: Erebidae
- Genus: Catocala
- Species: C. chelidonia

Binomial name
- Catocala chelidonia Grote, 1881

= Catocala chelidonia =

Species of moth

Catocala chelidonia is a moth of the family Erebidae. It is found from Arizona and Utah to California.

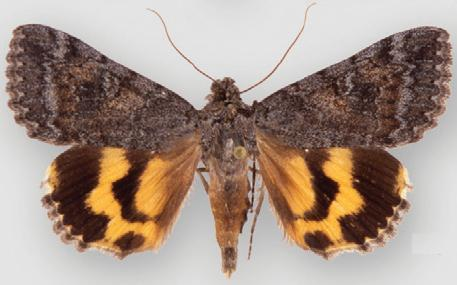
Catocala chelidonia occidentalis

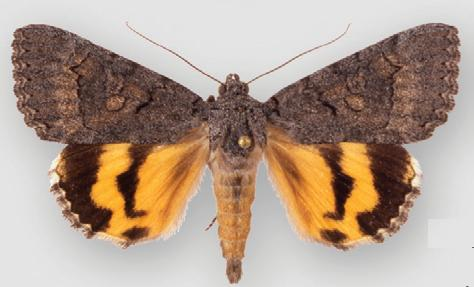
Catocala chelidonia uniforma

The wingspan is 45–50 mm. Adults are on wing from June to September depending on the location. There is probably one generation per year.

The larvae feed on Quercus species.

== Subspecies ==
- Catocala chelidonia chelidonia Grote, 1881 (from southern Nevada and south-central Utah southward and eastward through Arizona to New Mexico)
- Catocala chelidonia occidentalis Hawks, 2010 (along the western desert edge in southern California and northward to at least Trinity County)
- Catocala chelidonia uniforma Hawks, 2010 (mountains of south-eastern Arizona and southwestern New Mexico)
