= Hulodini =

Scientific classification
- Kingdom: Animalia
- Phylum: Arthropoda
- Class: Insecta
- Order: Lepidoptera
- Superfamily: Noctuoidea
- Family: Erebidae
- Subfamily: Erebinae
- Tribe: Hulodini; Guenée, 1852

Tribe of moths

The Hulodini are a tribe of moths in the family Erebidae.

== Taxonomy ==
The tribe may be most closely related to the tribe Ercheiini, also within the Erebinae.

== Genera ==
- Ericeia
- Hulodes
- Lacera
- Speiredonia
