= Pandesmini =

Scientific classification
- Kingdom: Animalia
- Phylum: Arthropoda
- Clade: Pancrustacea
- Class: Insecta
- Order: Lepidoptera
- Superfamily: Noctuoidea
- Family: Erebidae
- Subfamily: Erebinae
- Tribe: Pandesmini; Wiltshire, 1990

Tribe of moths

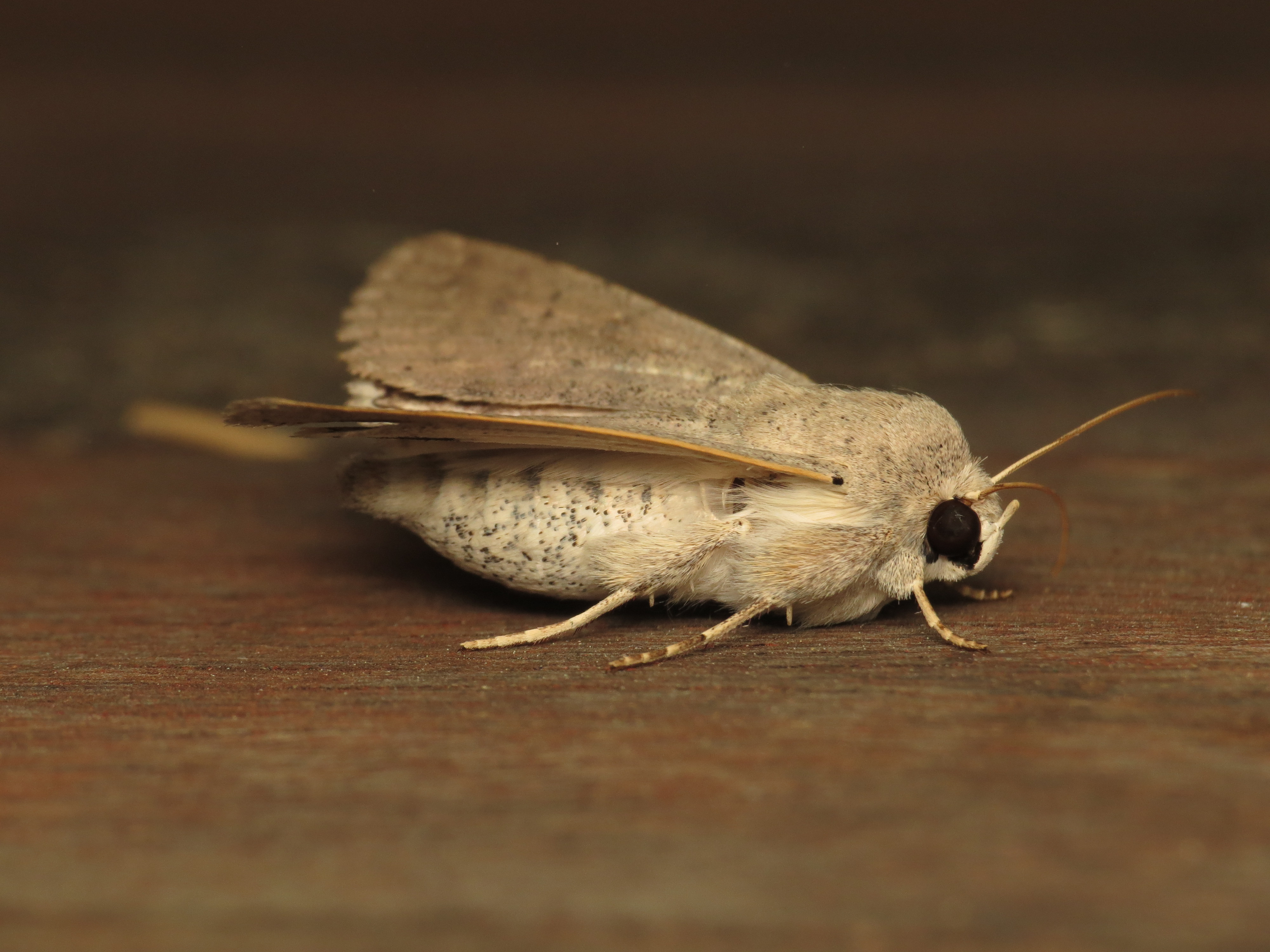
Pandesma submurina

The Pandesmini are a tribe of moths in the family Erebidae.

== Genera ==
- Pandesma
- Polydesma
