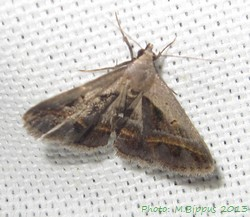
- Acantholipes trimeni

Scientific classification
- Kingdom: Animalia
- Phylum: Arthropoda
- Clade: Pancrustacea
- Class: Insecta
- Order: Lepidoptera
- Superfamily: Noctuoidea
- Family: Erebidae
- Subfamily: Erebinae
- Tribe: Acantholipini; Fibiger & Lafontaine, 2005

Synonyms
- Acantholipini Goater, Ronkay & Fibiger, 2003 (unavailable); Acantholipini Wiltshire, [1977] (nomen nudum)

= Acantholipini =

Tribe of moths

The Acantholipini are a tribe of moths in the family Erebidae.

== Genera ==
- Acantholipes
- Hypospila
- Tochara
- Ugia
- Ugiodes
