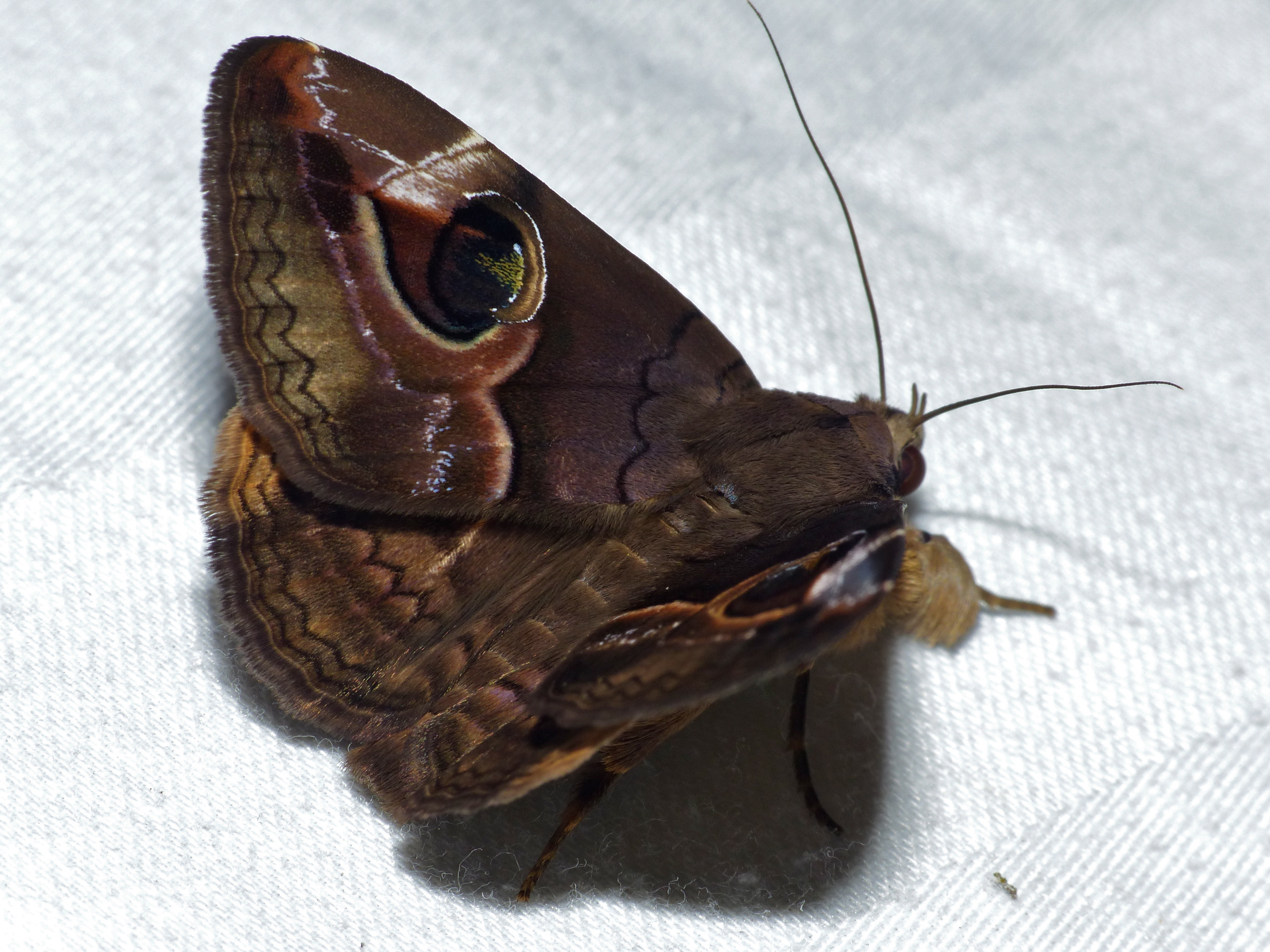
- Ommatophora luminosa

Scientific classification
- Kingdom: Animalia
- Phylum: Arthropoda
- Class: Insecta
- Order: Lepidoptera
- Superfamily: Noctuoidea
- Family: Erebidae
- Subfamily: Erebinae
- Tribe: Ommatophorini; Guenée, 1852

= Ommatophorini =

Tribe of moths

The Ommatophorini are a tribe of moths in the family Erebidae.

== Genera ==
- Calyptis
- Ommatophora
