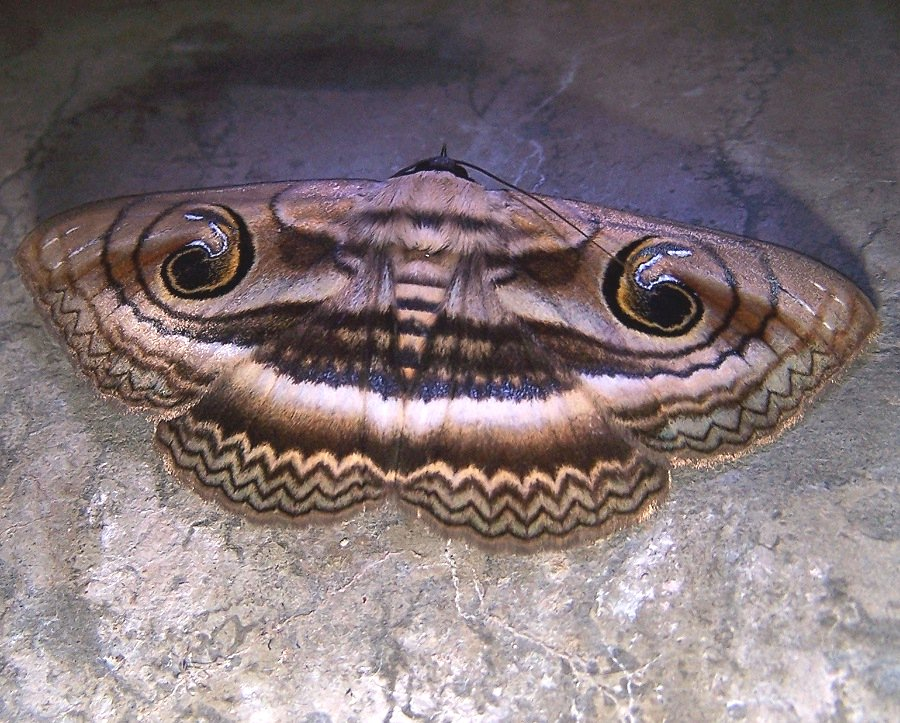

Scientific classification
- Kingdom: Animalia
- Phylum: Arthropoda
- Class: Insecta
- Order: Lepidoptera
- Superfamily: Noctuoidea
- Family: Erebidae
- Subfamily: Erebinae
- Tribe: Hypopyrini; Guenée, 1852

= Hypopyrini =

Tribe of moths

The Hypopyrini are a tribe of moths in the family Erebidae.

== Genera ==
- Cometaster
- Hexamitoptera
- Hypopyra
- Spirama
