= Erebini =

- Erebus macrops

Scientific classification
- Kingdom: Animalia
- Phylum: Arthropoda
- Class: Insecta
- Order: Lepidoptera
- Superfamily: Noctuoidea
- Family: Erebidae
- Subfamily: Erebinae
- Tribe: Erebini; Leach, [1815]

Tribe of moths

The Erebini are a tribe of moths in the family Erebidae.

== Genera ==
- Erebus
- Erygia
- Lygniodes
