= Pericymini =

Scientific classification
- Kingdom: Animalia
- Phylum: Arthropoda
- Class: Insecta
- Order: Lepidoptera
- Superfamily: Noctuoidea
- Family: Erebidae
- Subfamily: Erebinae
- Tribe: Pericymini; Wiltshire, 1976

Tribe of moths

The Pericymini are a tribe of moths in the family Erebidae.

== Genera ==
- Pericyma
- Zethes
