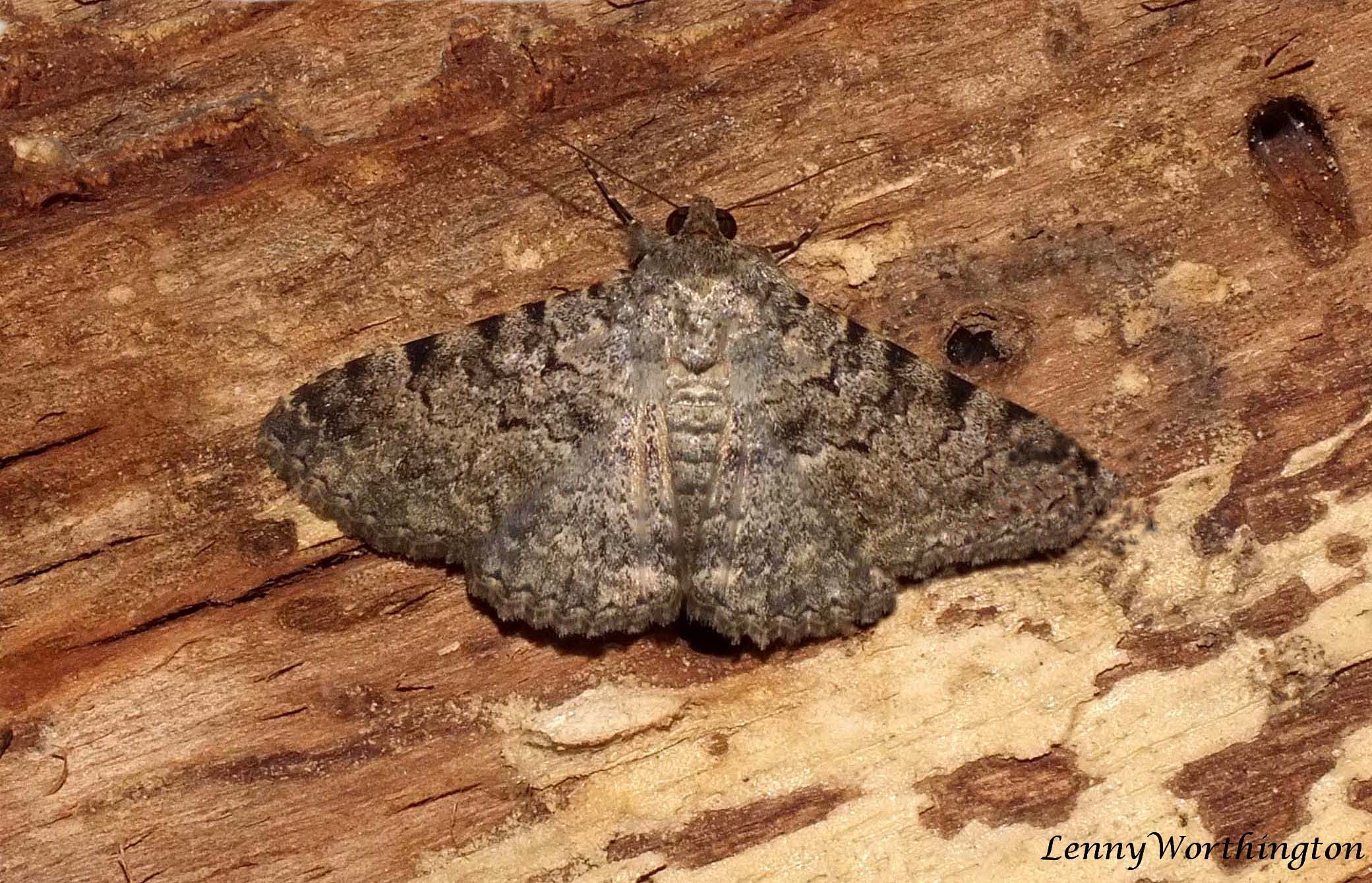

Scientific classification
- Kingdom: Animalia
- Phylum: Arthropoda
- Class: Insecta
- Order: Lepidoptera
- Superfamily: Noctuoidea
- Family: Erebidae
- Genus: Polydesma
- Species: P. boarmoides

Binomial name
- Polydesma boarmoides Guenée, 1852

Synonyms
- Polydesma mastrucata Felder & Rogenhofer, 1874

= Polydesma boarmoides =

Species of moth

Polydesma boarmoides is a species of moth in the family Erebidae. It was first described by Achille Guenée in 1852. The species is found from the Indo-Australian tropics east from Sri Lanka, to Australia, Myanmar, Fiji and New Caledonia. It has also been recorded from the Marianas, Carolines, Society Islands, and Hawaii.

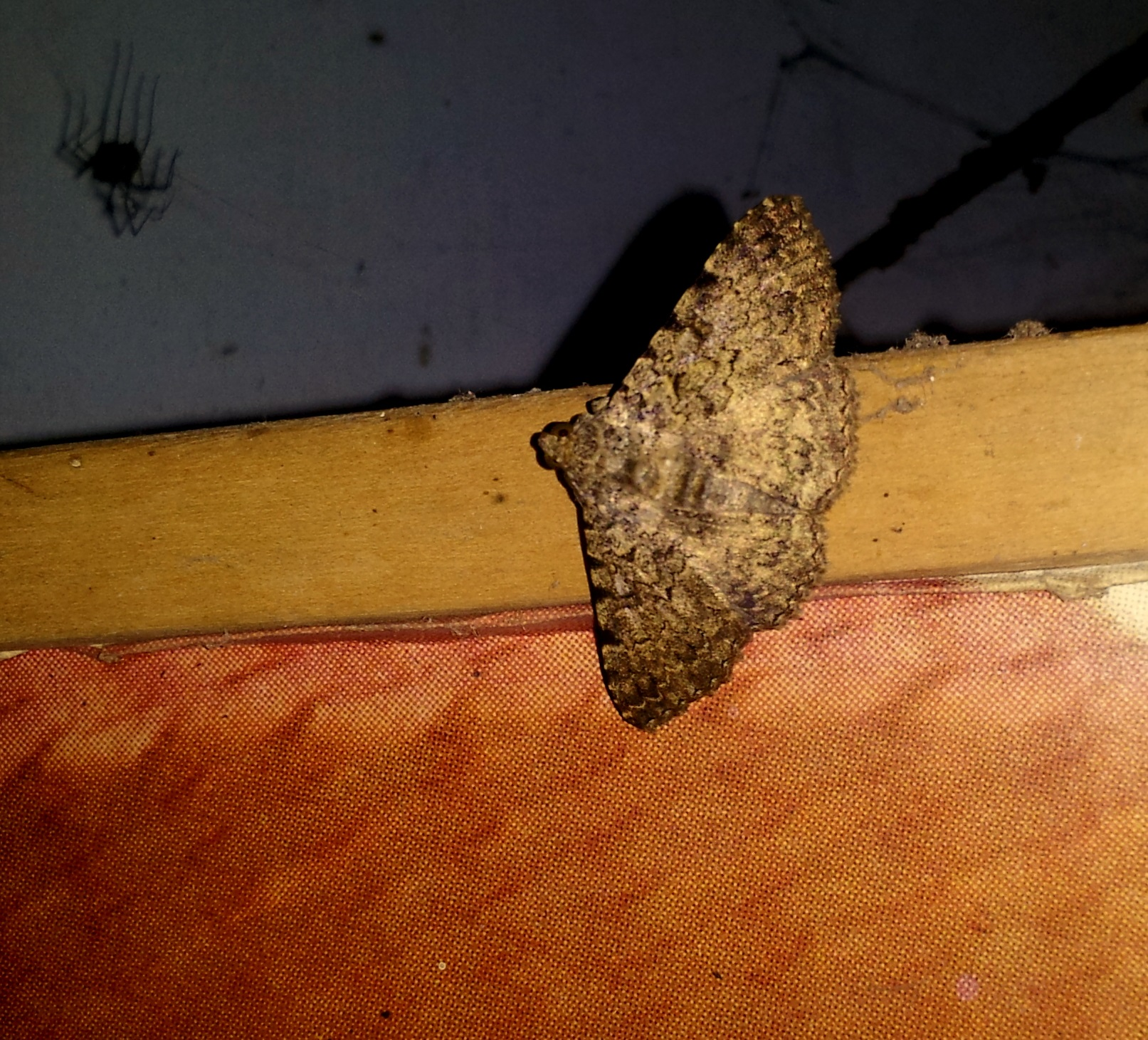
from Sri Lanka
