= Audeini =

Scientific classification
- Kingdom: Animalia
- Phylum: Arthropoda
- Class: Insecta
- Order: Lepidoptera
- Superfamily: Noctuoidea
- Family: Erebidae
- Subfamily: Erebinae
- Tribe: Audeini; Whitshire, 1990

Tribe of moths

The Audeini are a tribe of moths in the family Erebidae.

== Taxonomy ==
The tribe is most closely related to the tribe Catocalini, also within Erebinae.

== Genera ==
- Audea
- Crypsotidia
- Hypotacha
