= Paranagia =

Scientific classification
- Kingdom: Animalia
- Phylum: Arthropoda
- Class: Insecta
- Order: Lepidoptera
- Superfamily: Noctuoidea
- Family: Erebidae
- Genus: Paranagia; Hampson, 1926
- Species: P. rufostrigata

Binomial name
- Paranagia rufostrigata (Bethune-Baker, 1906)

Synonyms
- Catephia rufostrigata Bethune-Baker, 1906; Catephia alboplagiata Bethune-Baker, 1906; Catephia glabripars Prout, 1924; Catephia mediogriseata Bethune-Baker, 1906; Paranagia alboplagiata; Paranagia glabripars; Paranagia mediogriseata

Genus of moths

Paranagia is a monotypic moth genus in the family Erebidae erected by George Hampson in 1926. Its only species, Paranagia rufostrigata, was first described by George Thomas Bethune-Baker in 1906. It is found on New Guinea and on the southern Maluku Islands, Sulawesi and Borneo. The habitat consists of forests and areas with secondary vegetation.
