= Ercheiini =

Scientific classification
- Domain: Eukaryota
- Kingdom: Animalia
- Phylum: Arthropoda
- Class: Insecta
- Order: Lepidoptera
- Superfamily: Noctuoidea
- Family: Erebidae
- Subfamily: Erebinae
- Tribe: Ercheiini; Berio, 1992

Tribe of moths

The Ercheiini are a tribe of moths in the family Erebidae.

== Taxonomy ==
The tribe may be most closely related to the tribe Hulodini, also within the Erebinae.

== Genera ==
- Anophiodes
- Ercheia
