= Platychasmatinae =

Scientific classification
- Kingdom: Animalia
- Phylum: Arthropoda
- Clade: Pancrustacea
- Class: Insecta
- Order: Lepidoptera
- Superfamily: Noctuoidea
- Family: Notodontidae
- Subfamily: Platychasmatinae; Nakamura, 1956

Subfamily of moths

Platychasmatinae is a small East Asian subfamily of the moth family Notodontidae. Only two genera are placed here at present:

- Cyphanta Walker, 1865
- Platychasma Butler, 1881

Though not all Notodontidae have been assigned to subfamilies yet, it is unlikely that many of these genera incertae sedis will turn out to be Platychasmatinae, as thus family is a rather ancient and distinct group. In fact, a newly discovered species of Platychasma is somewhat intermediate between the two genera, suggesting that this subfamily might actually be monotypic.
