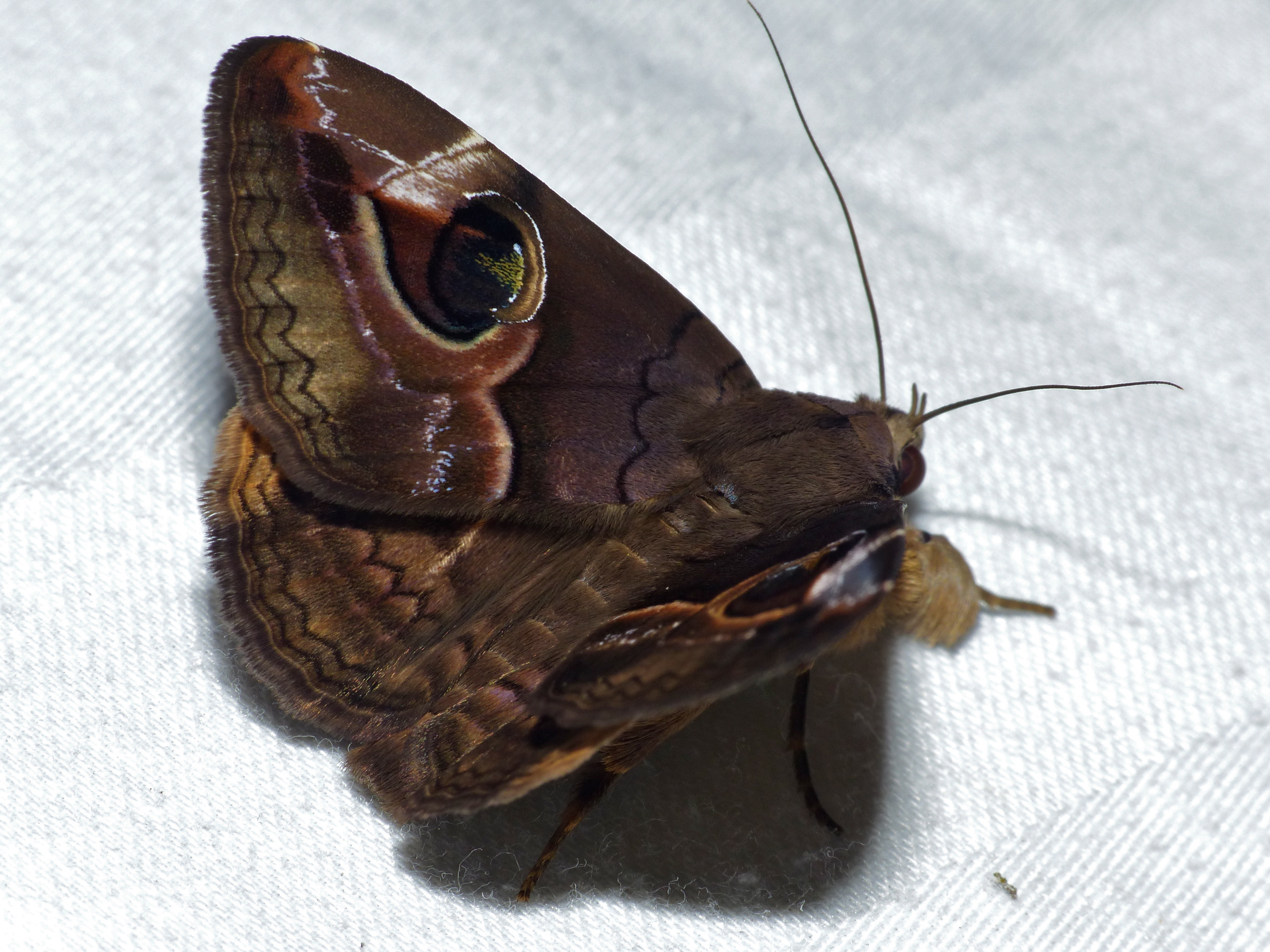

Scientific classification
- Domain: Eukaryota
- Kingdom: Animalia
- Phylum: Arthropoda
- Class: Insecta
- Order: Lepidoptera
- Superfamily: Noctuoidea
- Family: Erebidae
- Genus: Ommatophora
- Species: O. luminosa

Binomial name
- Ommatophora luminosa (Cramer, 1780)

Synonyms
- Phalaena luminosa Cramer, 1780

= Ommatophora luminosa =

Species of moth

Ommatophora luminosa is a species of moth in the family Erebidae. The species is found from the Himalayas and Taiwan to Sundaland.

The wingspan is 58–60 mm.
