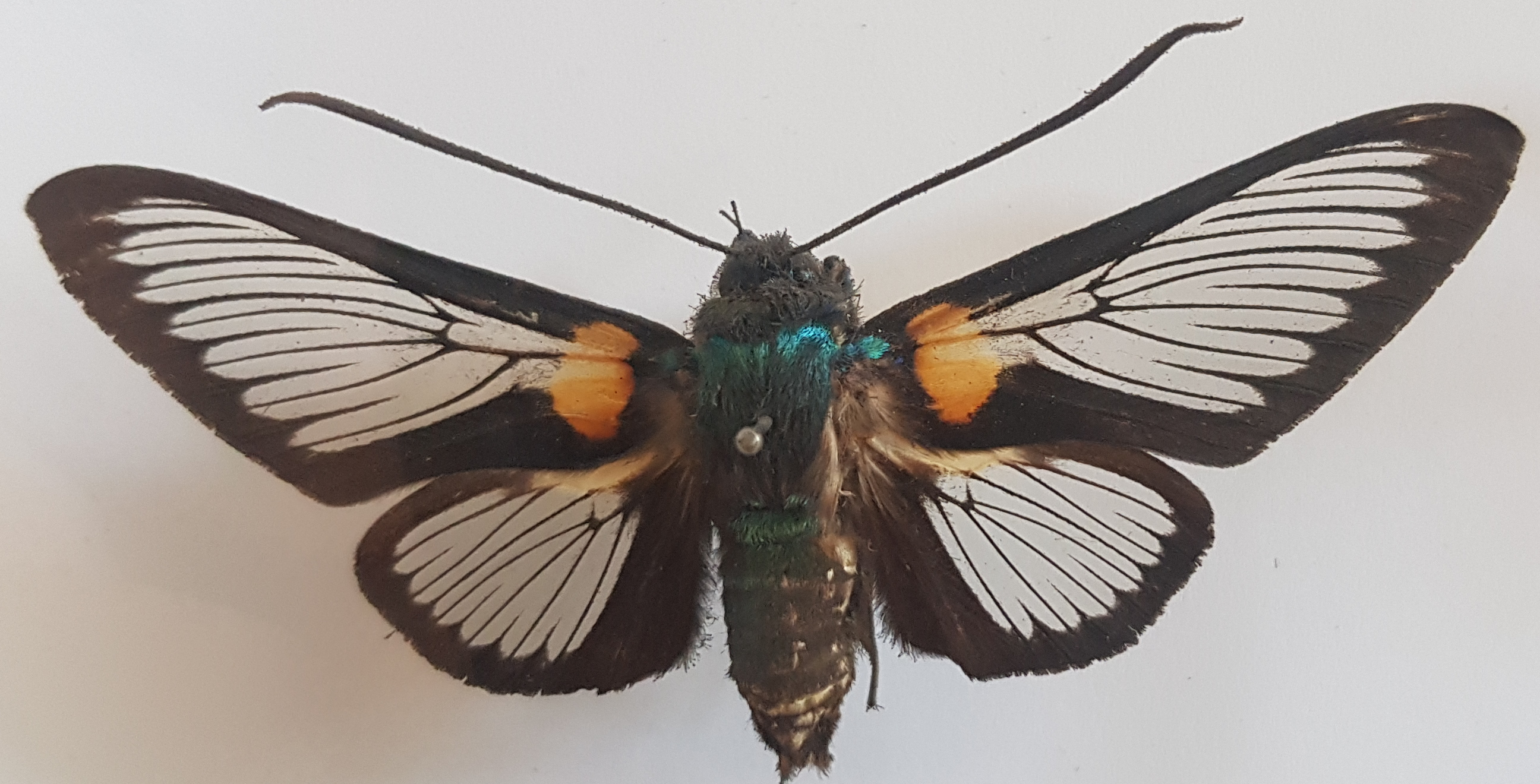

Scientific classification
- Kingdom: Animalia
- Phylum: Arthropoda
- Class: Insecta
- Order: Lepidoptera
- Superfamily: Noctuoidea
- Family: Erebidae
- Genus: Cocytia; Boisduval, 1828
- Species: C. durvillii

Binomial name
- Cocytia durvillii Boisduval, 1828

Synonyms
- (Genus): Rhoptrophalaena Hampson, 1918; (Species): Cocytia durvillii ab. moestifica Mabille & Vuillot, 1891

= Cocytia =

Cocytia durvillii

Genus and species of moth

Cocytia is a genus of moths in the family Erebidae. It is monotypic, being represented by the single species, Cocytia durvillii, an uncommon day-flying moth found in lowland areas of the Moluccas, Aru, and New Guinea. The species has clear wings bordered with black, with an orange patch at the base of each forewing and long antennae, thicker at the outer end. Both the genus and species were first described by Jean Baptiste Boisduval in 1828.

== Subspecies ==
- Cocytia durvillii aurantiaca Rothschild, 1897 (Tenimber)
- Cocytia durvillii chlorosoma Butler, 1875 (Aru)
- Cocytia durvillii durvillii Boisduval, 1828 (Papua New Guinea)
- Cocytia durvillii ribbei Druce, 1884 (Aru)
- Cocytia durvillii veitschi Butler, 1884 (Batchian)
