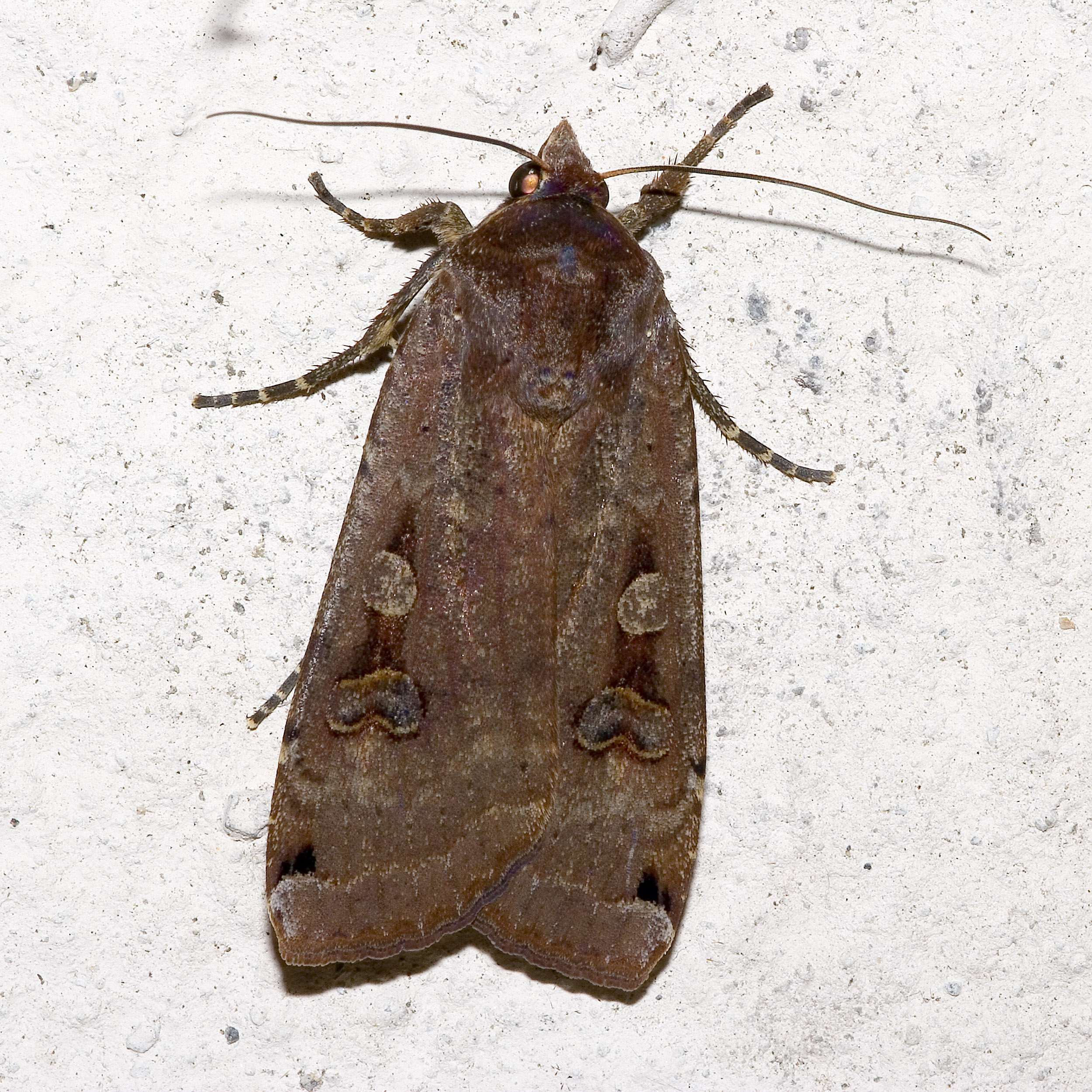
- Large yellow underwing, Noctua pronuba

Scientific classification
- Kingdom: Animalia
- Phylum: Arthropoda
- Clade: Pancrustacea
- Class: Insecta
- Order: Lepidoptera
- Clade: Eulepidoptera
- Clade: Ditrysia
- Clade: Apoditrysia
- Clade: Obtectomera
- Clade: Macroheterocera
- Superfamily: Noctuoidea

Families
- Erebidae; Euteliidae; Noctuidae; Nolidae; Notodontidae; Oenosandridae; Scranciidae

Diversity
- over 70,000 species

= Noctuoidea =

Superfamily of moths

Noctuoidea is the superfamily of noctuid (Latin "night owl") or "owlet" moths, and has more than 70,000 described species, the largest number of any Lepidopteran superfamily. Its classification has not yet reached a satisfactory or stable state. Since the end of the 20th century, increasing availability of molecular phylogenetic data for this hugely successful radiation has led to several competing proposals for a taxonomic arrangement that correctly represents the relationships between the major lineages.

The taxonomic disputes about the classification of the noctuoidea are related to the fact that in old classification attempts (just as unable to reach a general consensus) the distinctness of some groups (such as the Arctiinae or Lymantriidae) was based on an over-emphasis on their characteristic appearances, while some less-studied lineages conventionally held to be Noctuidae are in fact quite distinct. This requires a rearrangement of the classification structure of at least the latter family (by simply including anything disputed within it). This is quite difficult to do, and various other approaches have been proposed in response to it. While there is general agreement on what the basal families of Noctuoidea are, the more diverse advanced group may be treated as one all-encompassing Noctuidae, two huge and two smaller families, or even more than four families (if Arctiinae or Lymantriidae are kept distinct); even then, these taxonomic groups would be still quite sizeable and difficult to refine.

== Recent developments ==
There are several recent studies suggesting a radical change in the traditional family level classification. Recent works in redefining the families within the Noctuoidea has been carried out by Kitching (1984), Poole (1995), Kitching and Rawlins [1998], Speidel et al. (1996), Mitchell et al. (1997, 2000, 2006), Fibiger and Lafontaine (2005), Lafontaine and Fibiger (2006), Zahiri et al. (2010), Kobayashi & Nonaka (2016), and Zahiri et al. (2023).

The Noctuoidea can be divided into two broad groups, those with a trifid forewing venation (Oenosandridae, and Notodontidae), and those with a quadrifid forewing venation (e.g., Arctiinae, Lymantriidae, Nolidae, Noctuidae). What has emerged from these investigations is that the quadrifid Noctuoidea form a monophyletic group. In 2005, Fibiger and Lafontaine arranged the quadrifid (forewing) group into several families, including the quadrifine (hindwing) Erebidae and trifine (hindwing) Noctuidae, based on evidence that suggested that the trifine noctuid subfamilies were derived from within the quadrifine subfamilies, so the family Erebidae would not be strictly monophyletic.

Lafontaine and Fibiger in 2006 then redefined the Noctuidae to include the entire quadrifid group, believing the Arctiinae, Lymantriidae, and Nolidae to be derived from within this expanded concept of Noctuidae (and closely related to the subfamily Catocalinae). In essence, groups such as the Arctiinae, which had previously been treated as a separate family, were more closely related to groups within the Noctuidae than to non-noctuid families. In order to address this, a revised classification would have meant either recognizing over 20 (often weakly defined) families, or a single well-defined family with numerous subfamilies. The latter was adopted (Lafontaine and Fibiger 2006).

More recent evidence from nuclear genes (Zahiri et al. 2010) confirms that the quadrifid (forewing) noctuoids form a monophyletic group, but also that this group can be further arranged into four monophyletic subgroups: 1) the quadrifine subfamilies; 2) the trifine subfamilies; 3) the Nolinae; and 4) the Euteliinae. Considering the massive size of the family, and the large number of subfamilies, tribes, and subtribes to arrange into a classification, Zahiri et al. (2010) chose the option of recognizing these four groups as families, namely Erebidae, Noctuidae, Nolidae, and Euteliidae, in addition to the basal trifid families.

Subsequent research has largely followed suit, with refinements such as the exclusion of Doidae from the superfamily, and the addition of a new family, Scranciidae.

== Systematics ==
This largely follows the work of Zahiri and colleagues and references cited therein, plus Kobayashi & Nonaka (2016) for groupings within Notodontidae. Note that the placement of Arctiinae, Erebidae, Euteliidae, Lymantriinae, and Nolidae as groups within Noctuidae has been largely rejected by recent authors, and that former families such as Dilobidae, Micronoctuidae, and Thyretidae are no longer recognized at ranks above subfamily, while Doidae is placed in the superfamily Drepanoidea.

- Family Erebidae Leach, 1815
  - Subfamily Aganainae Boisduval, 1833
  - Subfamily Anobinae Holloway, 2005
  - Subfamily Arctiinae Leach, 1815)
    - Tribe Arctiini Leach, 1815
      - Subtribe Arctiina Leach, 1815
      - Subtribe Callimorphina Walker, 1865 (incl. Nyctemerina)
      - Subtribe Ctenuchina Kirby, 1837
      - Subtribe Euchromiina Butler, 1876
      - Subtribe Pericopina Walker, 1865
      - Subtribe Phaegopterina Kirby, 1892
    - Tribe Lithosiini Billberg, 1820
    - Tribe Syntomini Herrich-Schäffer, 1846 (inc. Thyretidae)
  - Subfamily Boletobiinae Grote, 1895 (incl. Araeopteroninae, Aventiinae, Eublemminae, Phytometrinae)
  - Subfamily Calpinae Boisduval, 1840
    - Tribe Calpini Boisduval, 1840
    - Tribe Phyllodini Guenée, 1852
  - Subfamily Erebinae Leach, 1815
    - Tribe Acantholipini Fibiger & Lafontaine, 2005
    - Tribe Anydrophilini Wiltshire, 1976
    - Tribe Arytrurini Fibiger & Lafontaine, 2005
    - Tribe Audeini Wiltshire, 1976
    - Tribe Catephiini Guenée, 1852
    - Tribe Catocalini Boisduval, 1828
    - Tribe Cocytiini Boisduval, 1874
    - Tribe Ctenusini Berio, 1992
    - Tribe Ercheiini Berio, 1992
    - Tribe Erebini Leach, 1815
    - Tribe Euclidiini Guenée, 1852
    - Tribe Hulodini Guenée, 1852 (= Speiredoniinae Swinhoe, 1900)
    - Tribe Hypopyrini Guenée, 1852
    - Tribe Melipotini Grote, 1895
    - Tribe Ommatophorini Guenée, 1852
    - Tribe Omopterini Boisduval, 1833
    - Tribe Ophiusini Guenée, 1837
    - Tribe Pandesmini Kühne & Speidel, 2004
    - Tribe Panopodini Forbes, 1954
    - Tribe Pericymini Wiltshire, 1976
    - Tribe Poaphilini Guenée, 1852
    - Tribe Scodionyxini Wiltshire, 1976
    - Tribe Sypnini Holloway, 2005
    - Tribe Thermesiini Guenée, 1852
  - Subfamily Eulepidotinae Grote, 1895
  - Subfamily Herminiinae Leach, 1815
  - Subfamily Hypeninae Herrich-Schäffer, 1851
  - Subfamily Hypenodinae Forbes, 1954 (incl. Micronoctuidae)
  - Subfamily Hypocalinae Guenée, 1852
  - Subfamily Lymantriinae Hampson, 1893
    - Tribe Arctornithini Holloway, 1999
    - Tribe Leucomini Grote, 1895
    - Tribe Lymantriini Hampson, 1893
    - Tribe Nygmiini Holloway, 1999
    - Tribe Orgyiini Wallengren, 1861
  - Subfamily Pangraptinae Grote, 1882
  - Subfamily Rivulinae Grote, 1895
  - Subfamily Scolecocampinae Grote, 1883
  - Subfamily Scoliopyteryginae Herrich-Schäffer, 1852
    - Tribe Anomini Grote, 1882
    - Tribe Scoliopyterygini Herrich-Schäffer, 1852
  - Subfamily Tinolinae Moore, 1885
  - Subfamily Toxocampinae Guenée, 1852
- Family Euteliidae Grote, 1882
  - Subfamily Euteliinae Grote, 1882
  - Subfamily Stictopterinae Hampson, 1894
- Family Noctuidae Latreille, 1809
  - Subfamily Acontiinae Guenée, 1841
    - Tribe Acontiini Guenée, 1841
    - Tribe Aediini Beck, 1960
    - Tribe Armadini Wiltshire, 1961
    - Tribe Hypercalymniini Fibiger & Lafontaine, 2005
  - Subfamily Acronictinae Heinemann, 1859 (incl. Lophonyctinae, Sinocharinae)
  - Subfamily Agaristinae Herrich-Schäffer, 1858
  - Subfamily Amphipyrinae Guenée, 1837
  - Subfamily Bagisarinae Crumb, 1956
    - Tribe Bagisarini Crumb, 1956
    - Tribe Cydosiini Kitching & Rawlins, 1998
  - Subfamily Balsinae Grote, 1896
  - Subfamily Bryophilinae Guenée, 1852
  - Subfamily Condicinae Poole, 1995
    - Tribe Condicini Poole, 1995
    - Tribe Leuconyctini Poole, 1995
  - Subfamily Cuculliinae Herrich-Schäffer, 1850
  - Subfamily Dilobinae Aurivillius, 1889
  - Subfamily Eriopinae Herrich-Schäffer, 1851
  - Subfamily Eucocytiinae Hampson, 1918
  - Subfamily Eustrotiinae Grote, 1882
  - Subfamily Hadeninae Guenée, 1837
    - Tribe Eriopygini Fibiger & Lafontaine, 2005
    - Tribe Glottulini Guenée, 1852
    - Tribe Hadenini Guenée, 1837
    - Tribe Leucaniini Guenée, 1837
    - Tribe Orthosiini Guenée, 1837
    - Tribe Tholerini Beck, 1996
  - Subfamily Heliothinae Boisduval, 1828
  - Subfamily Metoponiinae Herrich-Schäffer, 1851
  - Subfamily Noctuinae Latreille, 1809
    - Tribe Agrotini Rambur, 1848
    - Tribe Noctuini Latreille, 1809
  - Subfamily Oncocnemidinae Forbes & Franclemont, 1954
  - Subfamily Pantheinae Smith, 1898
  - Subfamily Plusiinae Boisduval, 1828
    - Tribe Abrostolini Eichlin & Cunningham, 1978
    - Tribe Argyrogrammatini Eichlin & Cunningham, 1978
    - Tribe Plusiini Boisduval, 1828
  - Subfamily Psaphidinae Grote, 1896
    - Tribe Feraliini Poole, 1995
    - Tribe Nocloini Poole, 1995
    - Tribe Psaphidini Grote, 1896
    - Tribe Triocnemidini Poole, 1995
  - Subfamily Raphiinae Beck, 1996
  - Subfamily Stiriinae Grote, 1882
    - Tribe Azenini Poole, 1995
    - Tribe Grotellini Poole, 1995
    - Tribe Stiriini Grote, 1882
  - Subfamily Strepsimaninae Meyrick, 1930
  - Subfamily Xyleninae Guenée, 1837
    - Tribe Actinotiini Beck, 1996
    - Tribe Apameini Guenée, 1841
    - Tribe Arzamini Grote, 1883
    - Tribe Caradrinini Boisduval, 1840
    - Tribe Dypterygiini Forbes, 1954
    - Tribe Eiaphriini Beck, 1996
    - Tribe Episemini Guenée, 1852
    - Tribe Phlogophorini Hampson, 1918
    - Tribe Phosphilini Poole, 1995
    - Tribe Prodenilni Forbes, 1954
    - Tribe Pseudeustrotiini Beck, 1996
    - Tribe Xylenini Guenée, 1837
- Family Nolidae Bruand, 1846
  - Subfamily Afridinae Kitching & Rawlins, 1998
  - Subfamily Bleninae Mell, 1943
  - Subfamily Chloephorinae Stainton, 1859
    - Tribe Ariolicini Mell, 1943
    - Tribe Camptolomini Mell, 1943
    - Tribe Careini Moore, 1883
    - Tribe Chloephorini Stainton, 1859
    - Tribe Eariadini Hampson, 1912
    - Tribe Gelastocerini Zahiri et al., 2013
    - Tribe Sarrothripini Hampson, 1894
  - Subfamily Collomeninae Kitching & Rawlins, 1998
  - Subfamily Diphtherinae Fibiger & Lafontaine, 2005
  - Subfamily Eligminae Mell, 1943
  - Subfamily Nolinae Bruand, 1846
  - Subfamily Risobinae Mell, 1943
  - Subfamily Westermanniinae Hampson, 1918
- Family Notodontidae Stephens, 1829
  - Subfamily Acrocteninae Kiriakof, 1970
  - Subfamily Anaphinae Sharpe, 1890
  - Subfamily Dioptinae Walker, 1862
  - Subfamily Dudusinae Matsumura, 1925
  - Subfamily Hemiceratinae Guenée, 1852
  - Subfamily Heterocampinae Neumogen & Dyar, 1894 (incl. Disphraginae, Fentoniinae, Rifarginae)
  - Subfamily Notodontinae Stephens, 1829
    - Tribe Dicranurini Duponchel, 1845 (incl. Cerurini)
    - Tribe Notodontini Stephens, 1829
    - Tribe Stauropini Matsumura, 1929
  - Subfamily Nystaleinae Forbes, 1948
  - Subfamily Periergosinae Kobayashi, 2016
  - Subfamily Phalerinae Butler, 1886
  - Subfamily Platychasmatinae Nakamura, 1956
  - Subfamily Pygaerinae Duponchel, 1845
  - Subfamily Roseminae Forbes, 1939
  - Subfamily Spataliinae Matsumura, 1929 (incl. Biretinae, Ceirinae)
  - Subfamily Thaumetopoeinae Aurivillius, 1889
- Family Oenosandridae Miller, 1991
- Family Scranciidae Miller, 1991

== Sources ==
- Fibiger, Michael (2007). "Revision of the Micronoctuidae (Lepidoptera: Noctuoidea). Part 1, Taxonomy of the Pollexinae" (PDF). Zootaxa. 1567: 1–116. doi:10.11646/zootaxa.1567.1.1.
- Fibiger, Michael (2008). "Revision of the Micronoctuidae (Lepidoptera: Noctuoidea). Part 2, Taxonomy of the Belluliinae, Magninae and Parachrostiinae" (PDF). Zootaxa. 1867: 1–136. doi:10.11646/zootaxa.1867.1.1.
- Hacker, Hermann H. & Zilli, Alberto (2007). Esperiana Buchreihe zur Entomologie Memoir 3: 179–246.
- Kitching, Ian J. & Rawlins, John E. (1999). "The Noctuoidea". In: Lepidoptera, Moths and Butterflies, Volume 1: Evolution, Systematics, and Biogeography, ed. N. P.Kristensen, pp. 355–401. Walter de Gruyter, Berlin.
- Lafontaine, J. Donald & Fibiger, Michael (2006). "Revised higher classification of the Noctuoidea (Lepidoptera)". Canadian Entomologist. 138 (5): 610–635 doi:10.4039/n06-012
- Lafontaine, J. Donald; Schmidt, B. Christian (2010). "Annotated check list of the Noctuoidea (Insecta, Lepidoptera) of North America north of Mexico". ZooKeys (40): 1–239. Bibcode:2010ZooK...40....1L. doi:10.3897/zookeys.40.414. ISBN 9789546425355.
- O'Toole, Christopher (ed.) (2002). Firefly Encyclopedia of Insects and Spiders. ISBN 1-55297-612-2.
