= Phyllodes =

Phyllodes may refer to:

- Phyllodes tumor, a type of abnormal growth found in breast tissue
- Phyllode, a flattened petiole or leaf rachis that resembles and functions as a leaf; part of a leaf and stalk of a plant
- a synonym for a genus of corals, Flabellum (coral)
- Phyllodes (moth), a genus of moths
