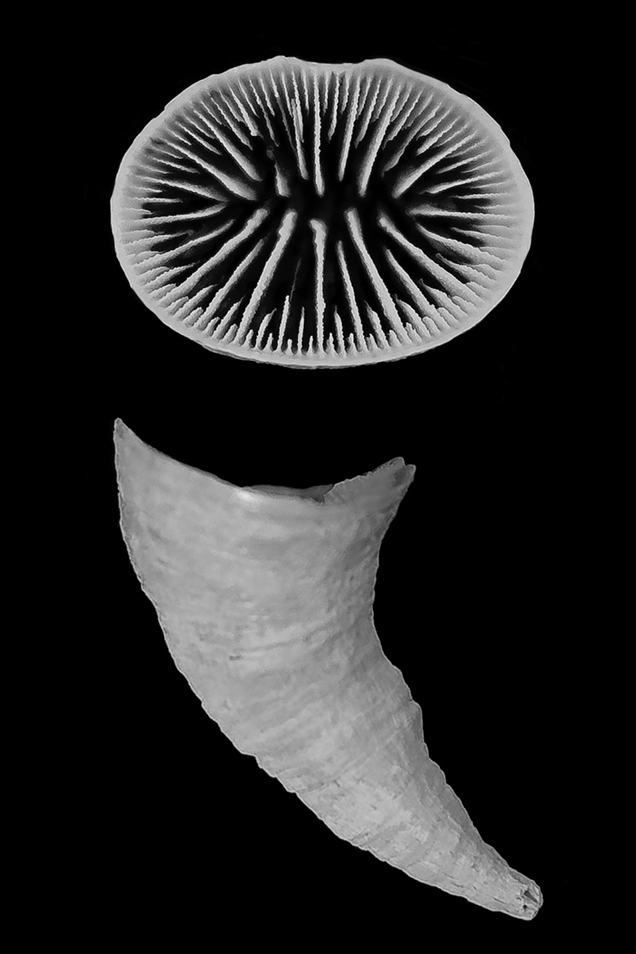

Scientific classification
- Kingdom: Animalia
- Phylum: Cnidaria
- Subphylum: Anthozoa
- Class: Hexacorallia
- Order: Scleractinia
- Family: Flabellidae
- Genus: Flabellum
- Species: F. curvatum

Binomial name
- Flabellum curvatum Moseley, 1881

= Flabellum curvatum =

Species of coral

Flabellum curvatum is a species of marine, cold water coral in the family Flabellidae. It is an azooxanthellate coral, that is to say without symbiotic zooxanthellae. The species is native to deep waters around Antarctica.

== Description ==
F. curvatum is a small, solitary coral growing to a height of some 3 to 4 cm (1.2 to 1.6 in). The slit-like mouth of the fleshy polyp is surrounded by a whorl of tentacles. The polyp secretes the corallum, the stony skeleton which supports it. In this species, the corallum is not attached to the seabed, but may be semi-immersed in soft sediment.

== Distribution ==
F. curvatum occurs in the Southern Ocean around Antarctica, but is also known from the southwestern Pacific Ocean and the southwestern Atlantic Ocean. It occurs on the continental slope, but it appears to have a disjunct distribution, with gaps between the various locations in which it has been found. It is a deep water coral, an azooxanthellate species, the tissues of which do not harbour symbiotic algae. Its depth range is 115 to 1,137 m (377 to 3,730 ft), with breeding corals off the west Antarctic Peninsula being at around 500 m (1,640 ft).

== Biology ==
The sexes are separate in F. curvatum, and like a number of other deep sea corals, the female broods its planular larvae. They are retained in the gastrovascular cavity where they are embedded in the mesenterial gastrodermis, with up to four per mesentery. Before they are released, the larvae have developed tentacle buds and an oral disc. In this and in other deep sea brooding corals, the oocytes are large (maximum diameter of 5120 μm in this species) and have large yolks to nourish the developing larvae. Fecundity is high, with a mean of 1618 oocytes per polyp. It is not clear why some scleractinian species brood their young, whereas others in similar habitats do not, but brooding does result in the ability of the larvae to settle almost immediately after liberation, and avoid a lengthy and risky planktonic stage.

In some corals that brood their young, the larvae are released in batches along with quantities of mucus and often seem to be forced out by an expulsive effort by the polyp. This is not the case with F. curvatum; the larvae are released singly, without mucus, and appear to be wafted out by cilia on the wall of the polyp's pharynx. The larvae soon sink to the sea floor nearby, and some are found to settle on the corallum of an adult. Within days of expulsion they are upright, each with twelve stumpy tentacles, twelve pairs of mesenteries, an oral disc and a mouth. Newly settled juveniles have been found at various times of year, so breeding appears to take place at any time of year.
