= Flabellum angulare =

Scientific classification
- Kingdom: Animalia
- Phylum: Cnidaria
- Subphylum: Anthozoa
- Class: Hexacorallia
- Order: Scleractinia
- Family: Flabellidae
- Genus: Flabellum
- Species: F. angulare

Binomial name
- Flabellum angulare Moseley, 1876

Species of coral

Flabellum angulare is a species of deep sea coral belonging to the family Flabellidae. It is found in the northern Atlantic Ocean at depths of between 2,000 and 3,186 m (6,600 and 10,500 ft).

== Description ==
Flabellum angulare is a solitary coral and does not form colonies. The type specimen was dredged from the seabed at 2,300 metres (7,500 ft) by the Challenger expedition off Nova Scotia, and described in 1876 by the British zoologist Henry Nottidge Moseley. It is a small species a few centimetres in diameter, with a regular pentagonal shape, and a regular arrangement of the septa (stony ridges), with ten septa in the first and second cycles, ten in the third and twenty in the fourth. The corallite is vase-shaped and has a short pedestal. The living coral is pearly white with a glistening surface.

== Biology ==
Flabellum angulare is an azooxanthellate species of coral; this means that its tissues do not contain photosynthetic algae and it gains its nutrition solely from what it can catch with its tentacles from the surrounding water. Despite living at bathyal depths to which no light penetrates, Flabellum angulare is one of a number of deep sea invertebrates that show synchronisation of their life cycles to the phases of the moon.
