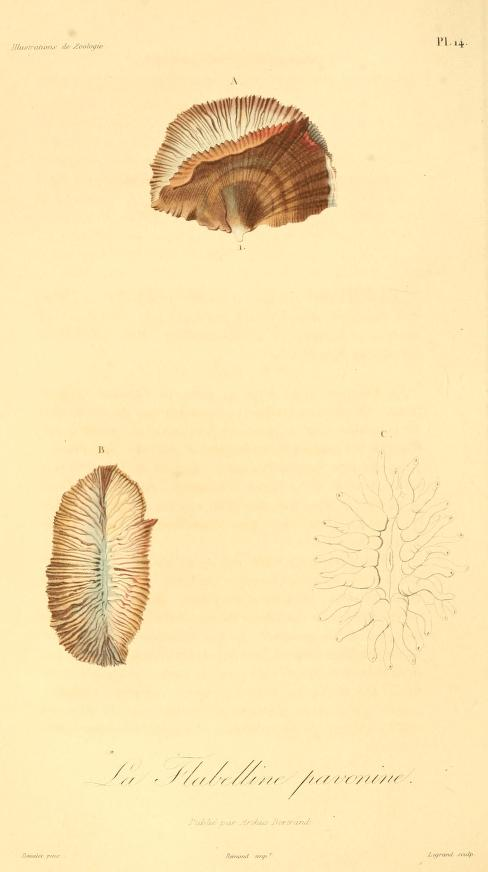

Scientific classification
- Kingdom: Animalia
- Phylum: Cnidaria
- Subphylum: Anthozoa
- Class: Hexacorallia
- Order: Scleractinia
- Family: Flabellidae
- Genus: Flabellum
- Species: F. pavoninum

Binomial name
- Flabellum pavoninum Lesson, 1831

Synonyms
- Flabellum distinctum Milne Edwards & Haime, 1848

= Flabellum pavoninum =

Species of coral

Flabellum pavoninum is a species of deep sea coral belonging to the family Flabellidae. It is found in the western Indo-Pacific Ocean at depths varying from 73 to 665 m (240 to 2,182 ft). They are sometimes known as dentures of the sea because of the perceived resemblance of the corallum (skeleton) to a set of dentures.

== Biology ==
Flabellum pavoninum is an azooxanthellate species of coral; this means that its tissues do not contain photosynthetic algae and it gains its nutrition solely from what it can catch with its tentacles from the surrounding water.
