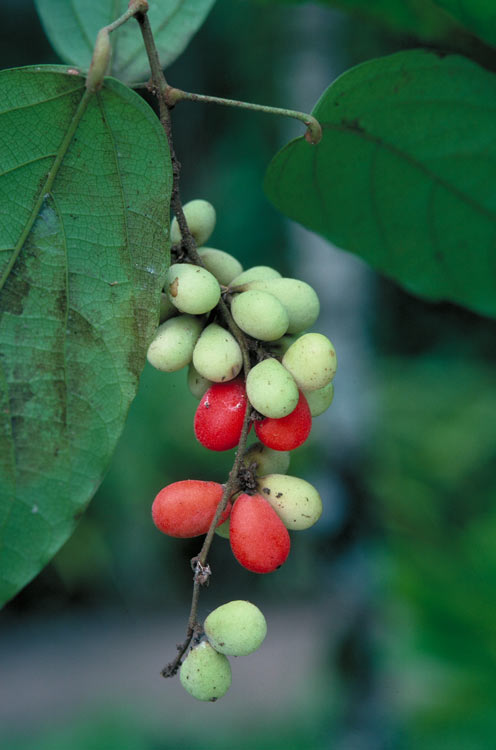
- Ripening fruit

Conservation status
- Least Concern (NCA)

Scientific classification
- Kingdom: Plantae
- Clade: Embryophytes
- Clade: Tracheophytes
- Clade: Spermatophytes
- Clade: Angiosperms
- Clade: Eudicots
- Order: Ranunculales
- Family: Menispermaceae
- Genus: Carronia
- Species: C. protensa

Binomial name
- Carronia protensa (F.Muell.) Diels

Synonyms
- Husemannia protensa F.Muell.; Aristega husemannii Fedde

= Carronia protensa =

Species of flowering plant

Carronia protensa is a species of plant in the moonseed family Menispermaceae. It is endemic to Queensland, Australia, and was first described in 1883.

== Description ==
Carronia protensa is a twining vine that may achieve a stem diameter of 8 cm (3 in). The leathery leaves can reach up to 25 cm (10 in) in length and 18 cm (7 in) in width, and are held on petioles (leaf stems) up to 8 cm (3 in) long.

Flowers are produced in clusters or panicles, emerging either from the leaf axils, terminally, or from the old wood of the branches. This species is dioecious, meaning that pistillate (functionally female) and staminate (functionally male) flowers are borne on separate plants. They are quite small—male flowers are about 4 mm (0.16 in) diameter while female flowers are about 2 mm (0.08 in) diameter. The fruit is a red, orange or yellow drupe up to 18 mm (0.7 in) long and 15 mm (0.6 in) wide, containing a single seed.

== Taxonomy ==
The plant was first described as Husemannia protensa by Australian botanist Ferdinand von Mueller in 1883, based on material collected from the Daintree and Endeavour Rivers. It was transferred to its current combination by German botanist Ludwig Diels, who undertook a review of the Menispermaceae in 1910.

=== Etymology ===
The genus was named after Australian botanist William Carron, and the species epithet protensa means 'extended'.

== Distribution and habitat ==
It grows in rainforest and gallery forest in northeastern Queensland, from the area near Lockhart River on Cape York Peninsula southwards along the coast to the vicinity of Tully. It also occurs on the subcoastal Atherton Tableland. The altitudinal range is from sea level to about 800 m (2,600 ft).

== Conservation ==
This species is listed as least concern under the Queensland Government's Nature Conservation Act. As of 30 May 2026, it has not been assessed by the International Union for Conservation of Nature (IUCN).

== Ecology ==
Carronia protensa, along with other Carronia species, is a host plant for larvae of the pink underwing moth (Phyllodes imperialis).

== Gallery ==
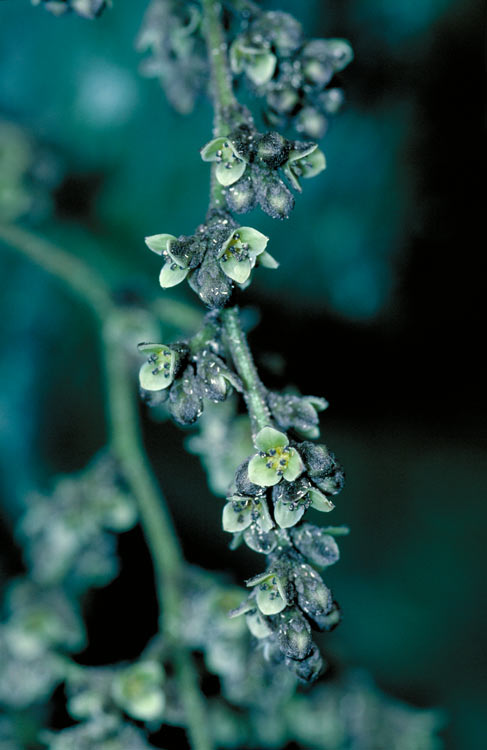
Male flowers

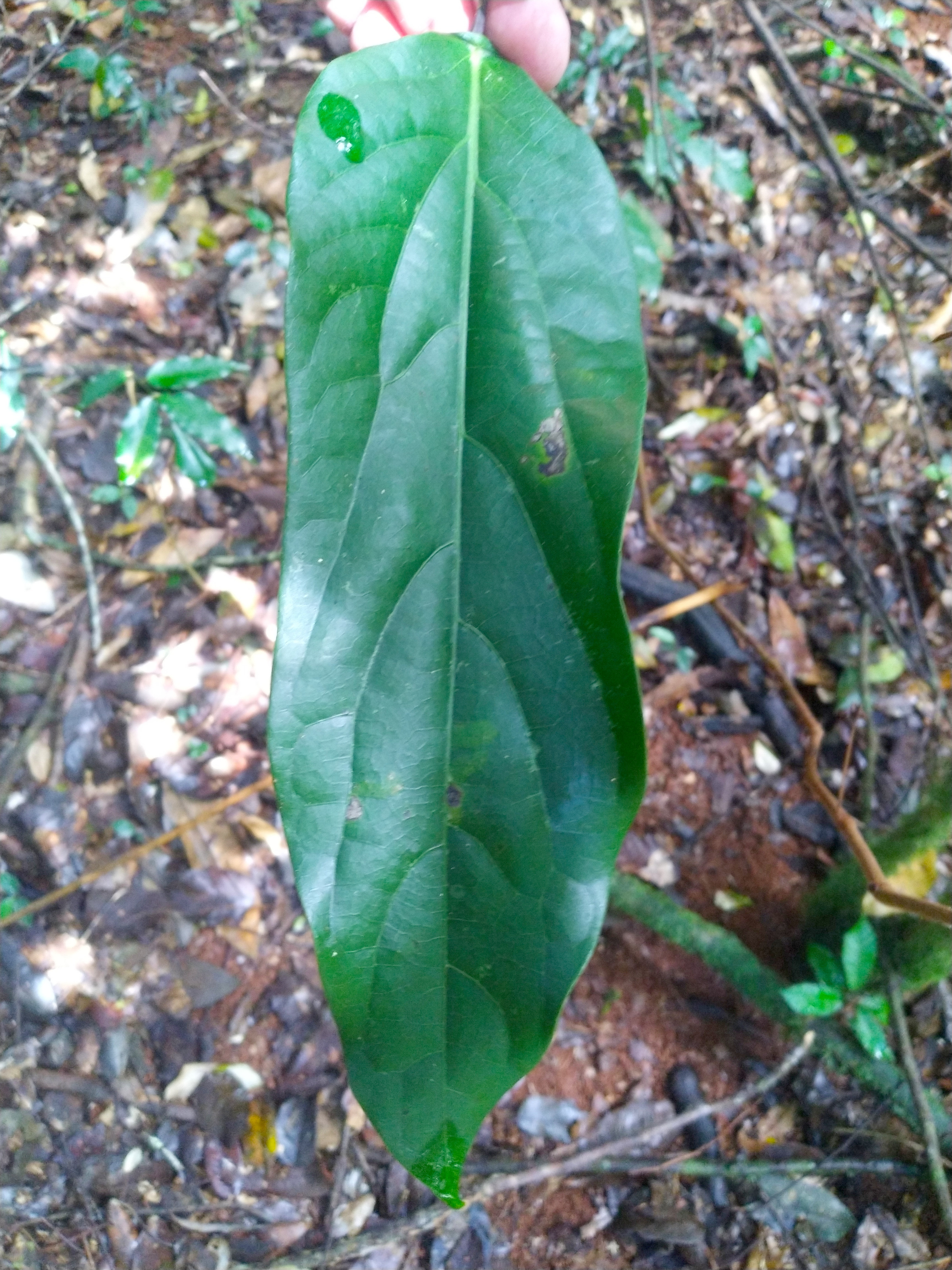
Leaf upper

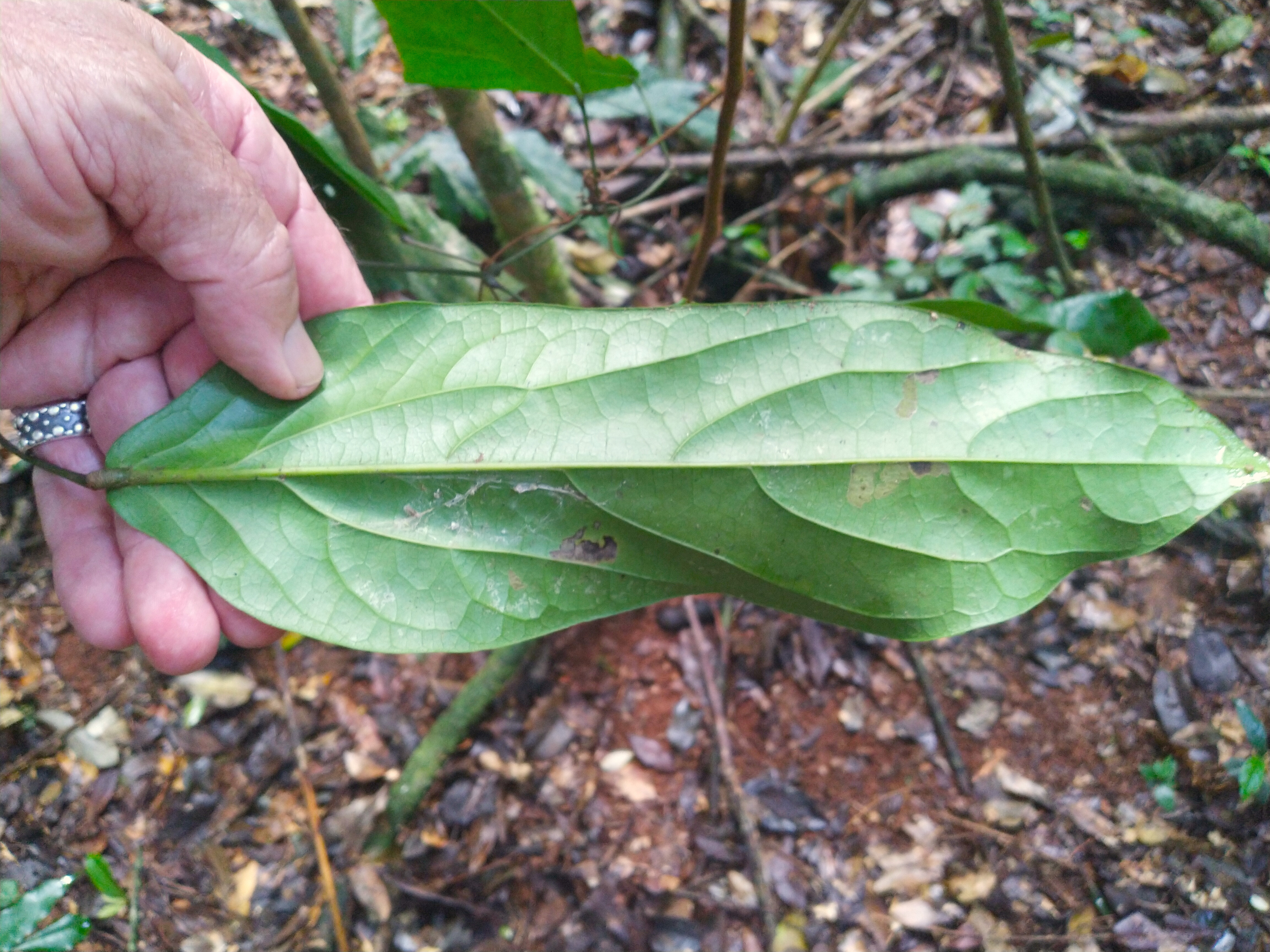
Leaf lower

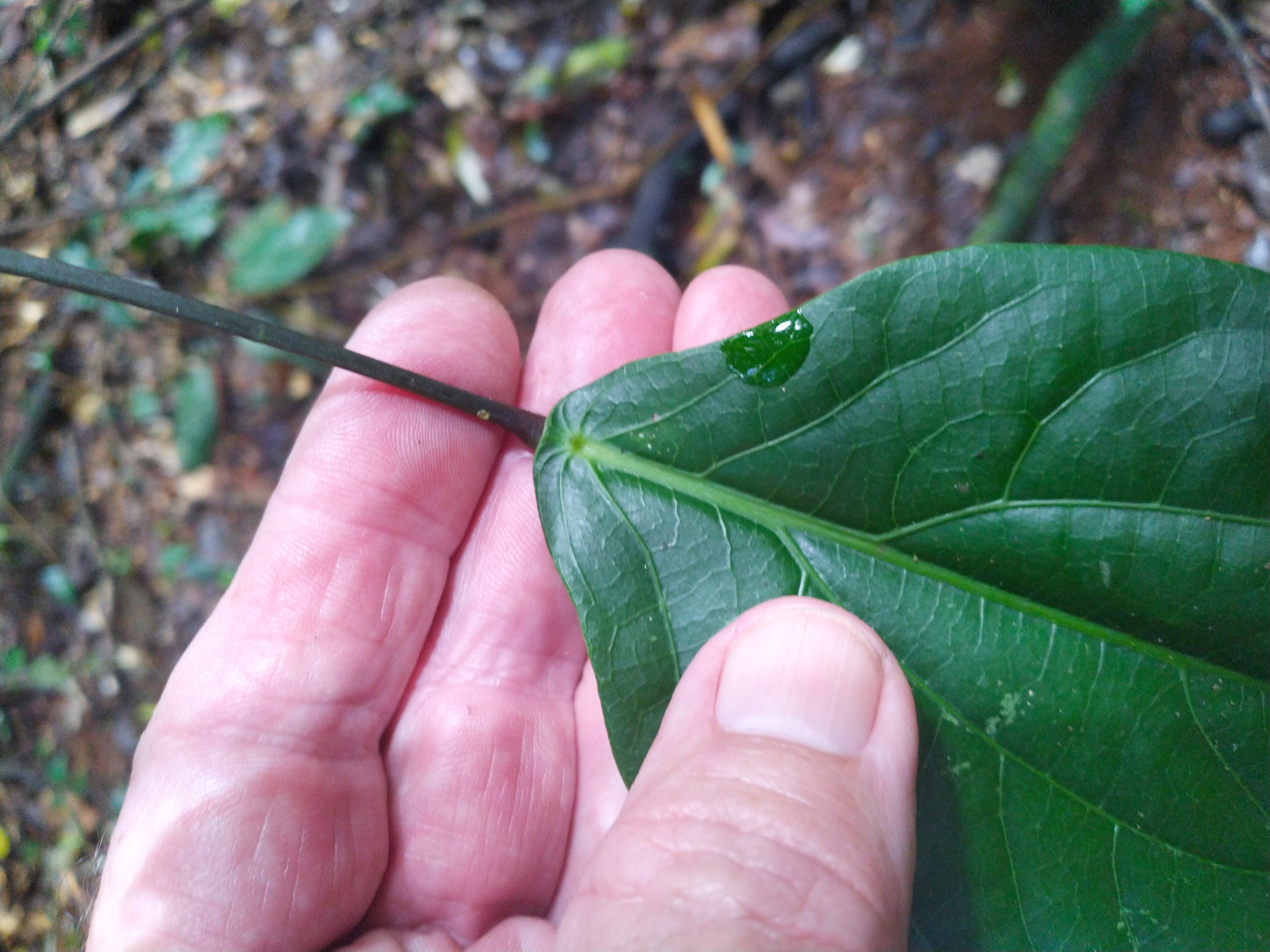
Detail
