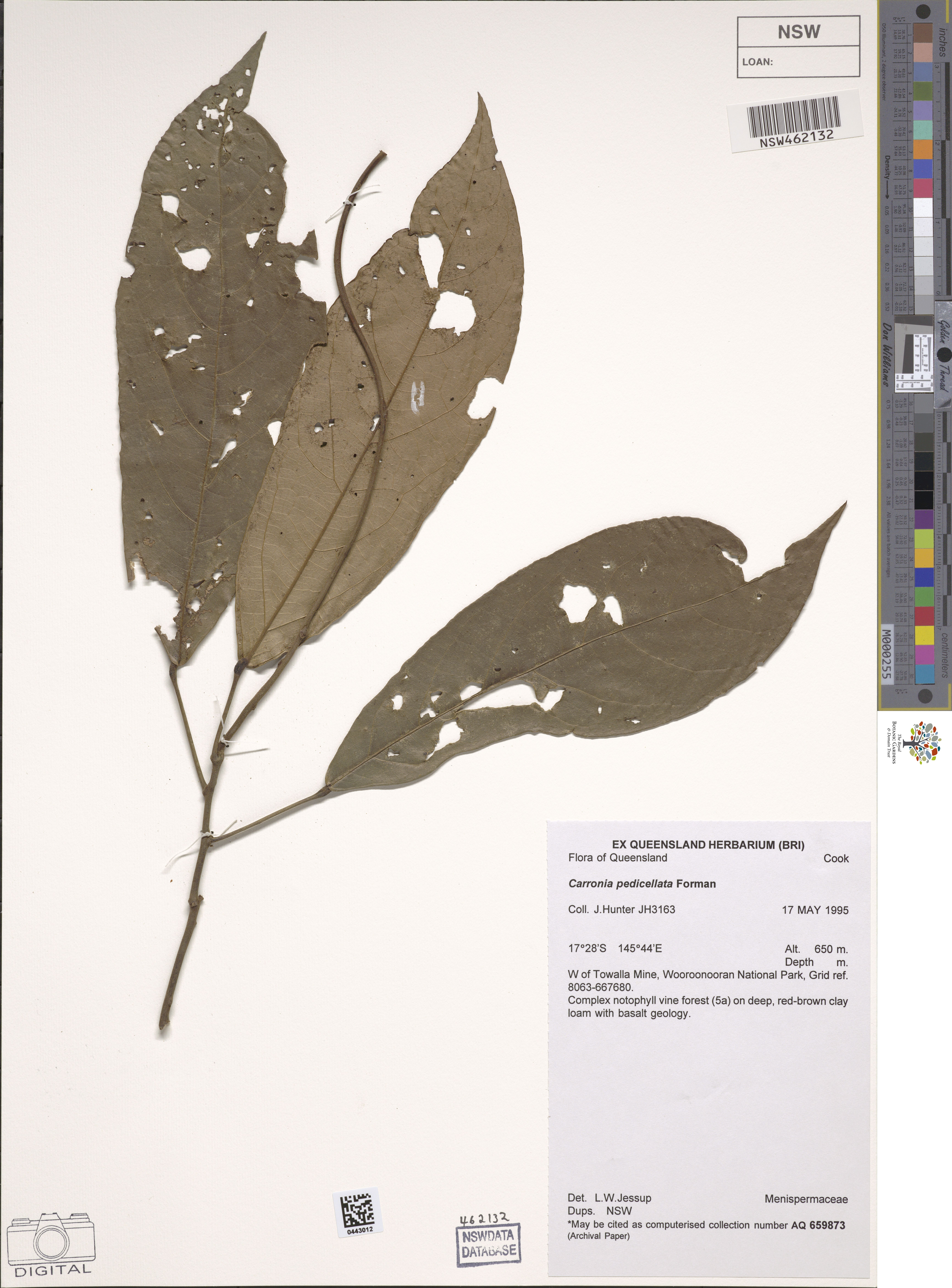

Conservation status
- Endangered (NCA)

Scientific classification
- Kingdom: Plantae
- Clade: Tracheophytes
- Clade: Angiosperms
- Clade: Eudicots
- Order: Ranunculales
- Family: Menispermaceae
- Genus: Carronia
- Species: C. pedicellata

Binomial name
- Carronia pedicellata Forman

= Carronia pedicellata =

Species of flowering plant

Carronia pedicellata is a species of plant in the family Menispermaceae. It is a vine that is native to the Wet Tropics bioregion of Queensland, Australia, first described in 1982. It has been assessed as being an endangered species under the Queensland Government's Nature Conservation Act.
