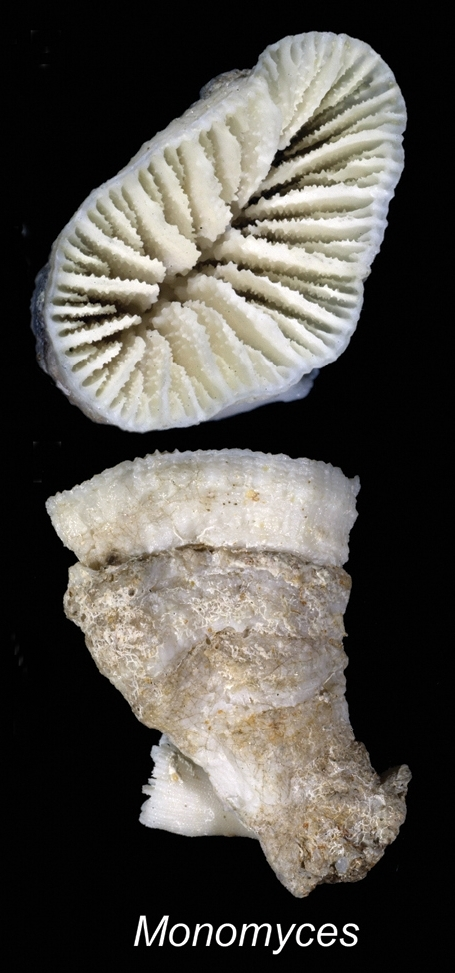
- Monomyces pygmaea

Scientific classification
- Domain: Eukaryota
- Kingdom: Animalia
- Phylum: Cnidaria
- Subphylum: Anthozoa
- Class: Hexacorallia
- Order: Scleractinia
- Family: Flabellidae
- Genus: Monomyces; Ehrenberg, 1834

= Monomyces =

Genus of corals

Monomyces is a genus of corals belonging to the family Flabellidae.

The genus has almost cosmopolitan distribution, except Arctic and Subarctic regions.

Species:

- Monomyces eburneus (Shaw, 1774)
- Monomyces pusillus Brünnich Nielsen, 1922
- Monomyces pygmaea (Risso, 1826)
- Monomyces rubrum (Quoy & Gaimard, 1833)
