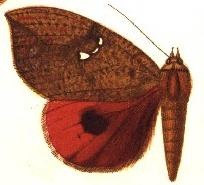
- Miniodes maculifera

Scientific classification
- Kingdom: Animalia
- Phylum: Arthropoda
- Class: Insecta
- Order: Lepidoptera
- Superfamily: Noctuoidea
- Family: Erebidae
- Tribe: Phyllodini
- Genus: Miniodes; Guenée in Boisduval & Guenée, 1852

= Miniodes =

Genus of moths

Miniodes is a genus of moths in the family Erebidae. The genus was erected by Achille Guenée in 1852.

== Species ==
- Miniodes discolor Guenée, 1852
- Miniodes maculifera Hampson, 1913
- Miniodes phaeosoma (Hampson, 1913)
