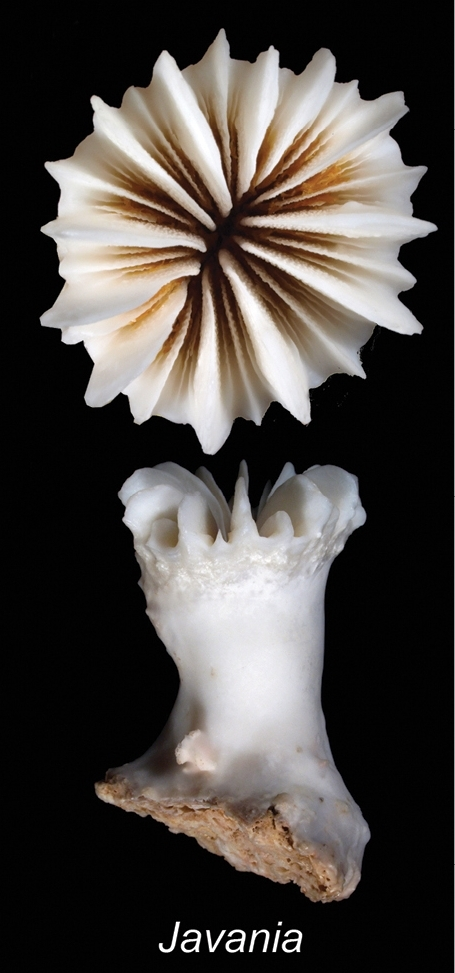
- Javania insignis

Scientific classification
- Kingdom: Animalia
- Phylum: Cnidaria
- Subphylum: Anthozoa
- Class: Hexacorallia
- Order: Scleractinia
- Family: Flabellidae
- Genus: Javania; Duncan, 1876

Type species
- Javania insignis Duncan, 1876

Synonyms
- Desmophyllum (Javania) Duncan, 1876

= Javania =

Genus of corals

Javania is a genus of marine corals belonging to the family Flabellidae, which was first described in 1876 by Peter Martin Duncan.

Species of this genus are found world-wide.

== Description ==
Duncan describes the genus as "a Desmophyllum with a remarkable epitheca", and more detailedly as:

JAVANIA, gen. nov.
The corallum is simple, tall, compressed at the calice, and adheres by a broad base. There is a complete epitheca, dense inferiorly, and pellicular superiorly. The larger septa are very exsert; and the tertiaries have costae much broader than they are. The costae of the primary and secondary orders project. There is no columella; and the calicular fossa is very deep. The genus is allied to Desmophyllum, Ehrenberg; but the absence of exsert higher orders of septa and the dense epitheca separate it from this form.

== Species ==
The following species are accepted by WoRMS as belonging to the genus Javania:

- Javania antarctica (Gravier, 1914)
- Javania borealis Cairns, 1994
- Javania cailleti (Duchassaing & Michelotti, 1864)
- Javania californica Cairns, 1994
- Javania clavata (Michelotti, 1871)
- Javania cristata Cairns & Polonio, 2013
- Javania deforgesi Kitahara & Cairns, 2021
- Javania duncani Wells, 1977 †
- Javania erhardti Cairns, 2004
- Javania exserta Cairns, 1999
- Javania fusca (Vaughan, 1907)
- Javania insignis Duncan, 1876
- Javania lamprotichum (Moseley, 1880)
- Javania pseudoalabastra Zibrowius, 1974
- Javania subturbinata (Michelotti, 1871) †
