= Conosmilia =

Conosmilia Temporal range: 37.2–5.33 Ma

Scientific classification
- Domain: Eukaryota
- Kingdom: Animalia
- Phylum: Cnidaria
- Subphylum: Anthozoa
- Class: Hexacorallia
- Order: Scleractinia
- Family: Flabellidae
- Genus: †Conosmilia; Duncan 1865

Species
- †Conosmilia elegans Duncan 1865; †Conosmilia granulata Dennant, 1904; †Conosmilia stylifera Dennant, 1904

Extinct genus of corals

Conosmilia is an extinct genus of corals in the family Flabellidae. C. elegans is from the Tertiary of South Australia (Geelong, Victoria, South Australia).

== See also ==
- List of prehistoric hexacoral genera
