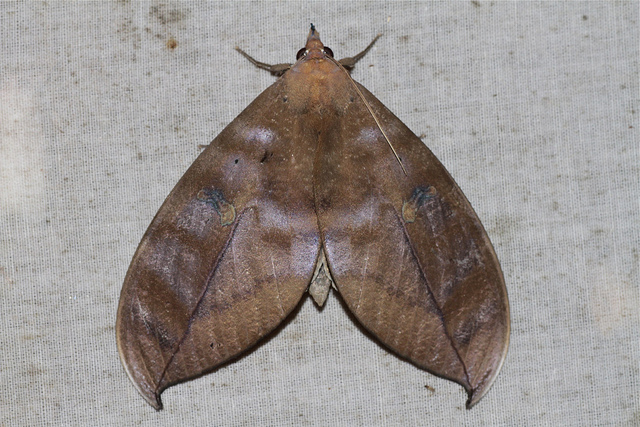
- In Borneo

Scientific classification
- Kingdom: Animalia
- Phylum: Arthropoda
- Clade: Pancrustacea
- Class: Insecta
- Order: Lepidoptera
- Superfamily: Noctuoidea
- Family: Erebidae
- Genus: Phyllodes
- Species: P. eyndhovii

Binomial name
- Phyllodes eyndhovii Vollenhoven, 1858

Synonyms
- Phyllodes semilinea Walker, 1864; Phyllodes fasciata Moore, 1867; Phyllodes eyndhovii formosana Okano, 1959

= Phyllodes eyndhovii =

Species of moth

Phyllodes eyndhovii is a noctuoid moth in the family Erebidae, subfamily Calpinae. The species was first described by Samuel Constantinus Snellen van Vollenhoven in 1858. It is found in the Himalayas, western China, Taiwan, Thailand, Sundaland and Palawan.

The larvae feed on Acacia species
