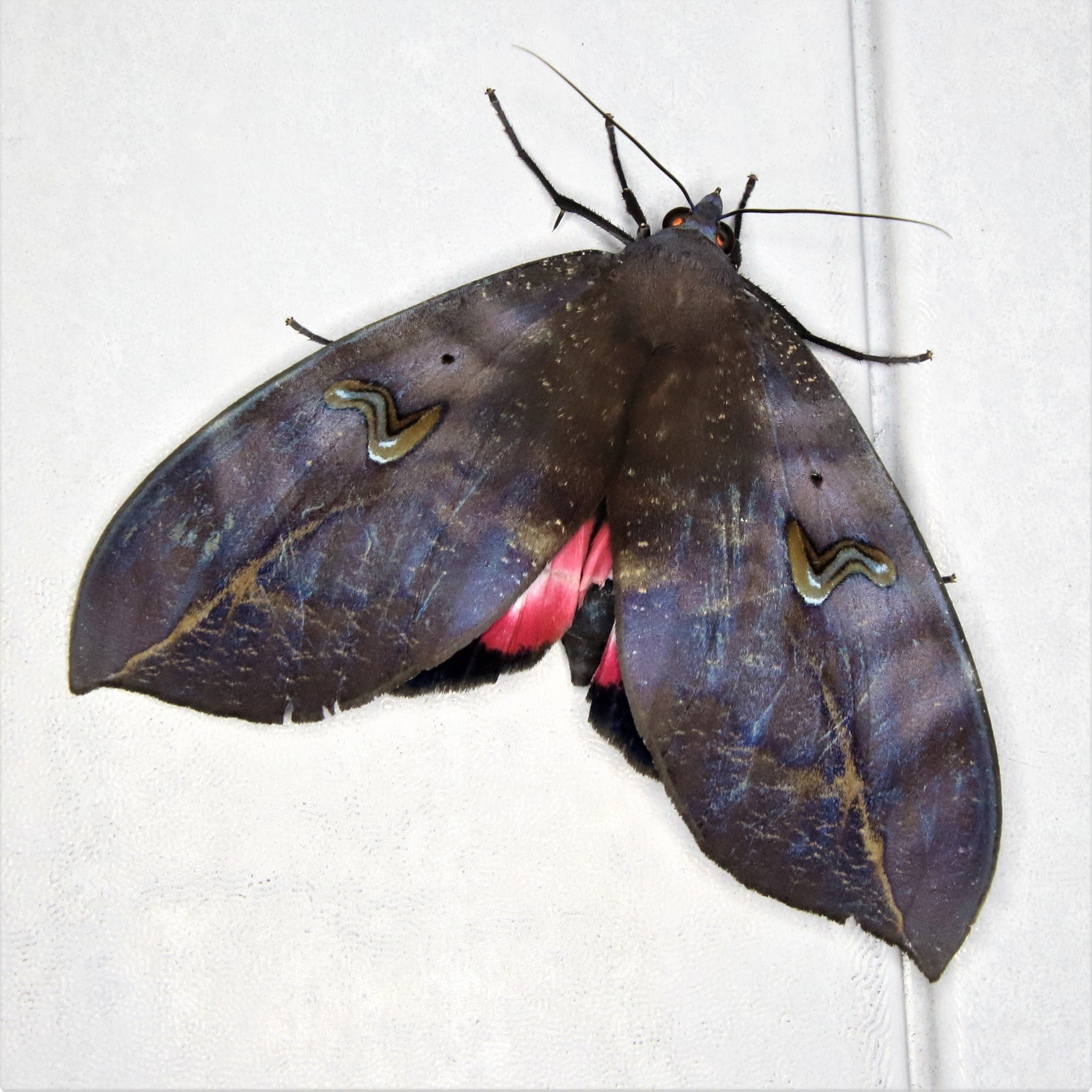

Scientific classification
- Kingdom: Animalia
- Phylum: Arthropoda
- Clade: Pancrustacea
- Class: Insecta
- Order: Lepidoptera
- Superfamily: Noctuoidea
- Family: Erebidae
- Genus: Phyllodes
- Species: P. consobrina

Binomial name
- Phyllodes consobrina Westwood, 1848

Synonyms
- Phyllodes roseigera Butler, 1883; Phyllodes perspicillator Guenée, 1852; Phyllodes maligera Butler, 1883

= Phyllodes consobrina =

Species of moth

Phyllodes consobrina is a noctuoid moth in the family Erebidae and subfamily Calpinae. It was first described by John O. Westwood in 1848. The species can be found in Asia, including Thailand, Sri Lanka, Bangladesh, the Andamans and India.

== Description ==
The wingspan is 124–142 mm. Palpi with second joint fringed with very long hair in front, producing a rounded form. Third joint long, oblique and knobbed at extremity. Forewings with produced apex to an acute point. Head and thorax fuscous, with a purple bloom. Abdomen bluish black. Forewings with fuscous brown with a purplish gloss and irrorated (sprinkled) with ochreous scales. Orbicular is a brown speck. There is an S-shaped brown mark found on the discocellulars, where its center is outlined with reddish brown. Its edges are brown, and two white marks can be seen on it near its lower angle. An oblique ochreous fascia runs from apex to below angle of cell, where it is bent down to inner margin. A large greyish-brown patch is usually present between the fascia and outer angle, with pale striae on it. Hindwings are bluish black. A large crimson patch is found with white center at anal angle. Ventral side is with white striations and whitish between the veins of the forewings.
