= Phyllodini =

Scientific classification
- Kingdom: Animalia
- Phylum: Arthropoda
- Class: Insecta
- Order: Lepidoptera
- Superfamily: Noctuoidea
- Family: Erebidae
- Subfamily: Calpinae
- Tribe: Phyllodini; Guenée, 1852

Tribe of moths

The Phyllodini are a tribe of moths in the family Erebidae.

== Taxonomy ==
The Phyllodini are thought to be one of the two clades comprising the Calpinae, with the other clade containing the tribes Calpini and Ophiderini.

== Genera ==
The following genera are included in the tribe.

- Miniodes
- Phyllodes
