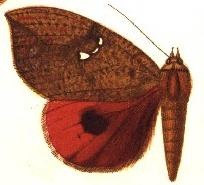

Scientific classification
- Kingdom: Animalia
- Phylum: Arthropoda
- Class: Insecta
- Order: Lepidoptera
- Superfamily: Noctuoidea
- Family: Erebidae
- Genus: Miniodes
- Species: M. maculifera

Binomial name
- Miniodes maculifera Hampson, 1913

= Miniodes maculifera =

Species of moth

Miniodes maculifera is a moth of the family Erebidae first described by George Hampson in 1913. It is found in Africa, including Gabon and Uganda.
