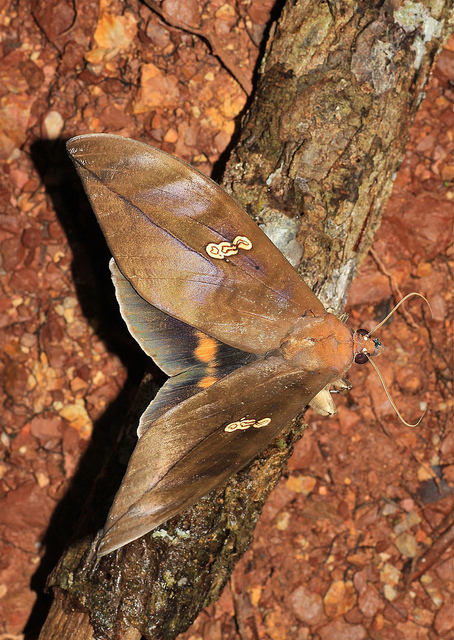
- Male from Mount Trusmadi in Malaysia

Scientific classification
- Domain: Eukaryota
- Kingdom: Animalia
- Phylum: Arthropoda
- Class: Insecta
- Order: Lepidoptera
- Superfamily: Noctuoidea
- Family: Erebidae
- Genus: Phyllodes
- Species: P. staudingeri

Binomial name
- Phyllodes staudingeri Semper, 1901

Synonyms
- Phyllodes eyndhovii staudingeri Semper, 1901; Phyllodes diversipalpus Prout, 1924

= Phyllodes staudingeri =

Species of moth

Phyllodes staudingeri is a moth in the family Erebidae first described by Georg Semper in 1901. It is found in Sumatra, Borneo, Java, the Philippines and New Guinea.
