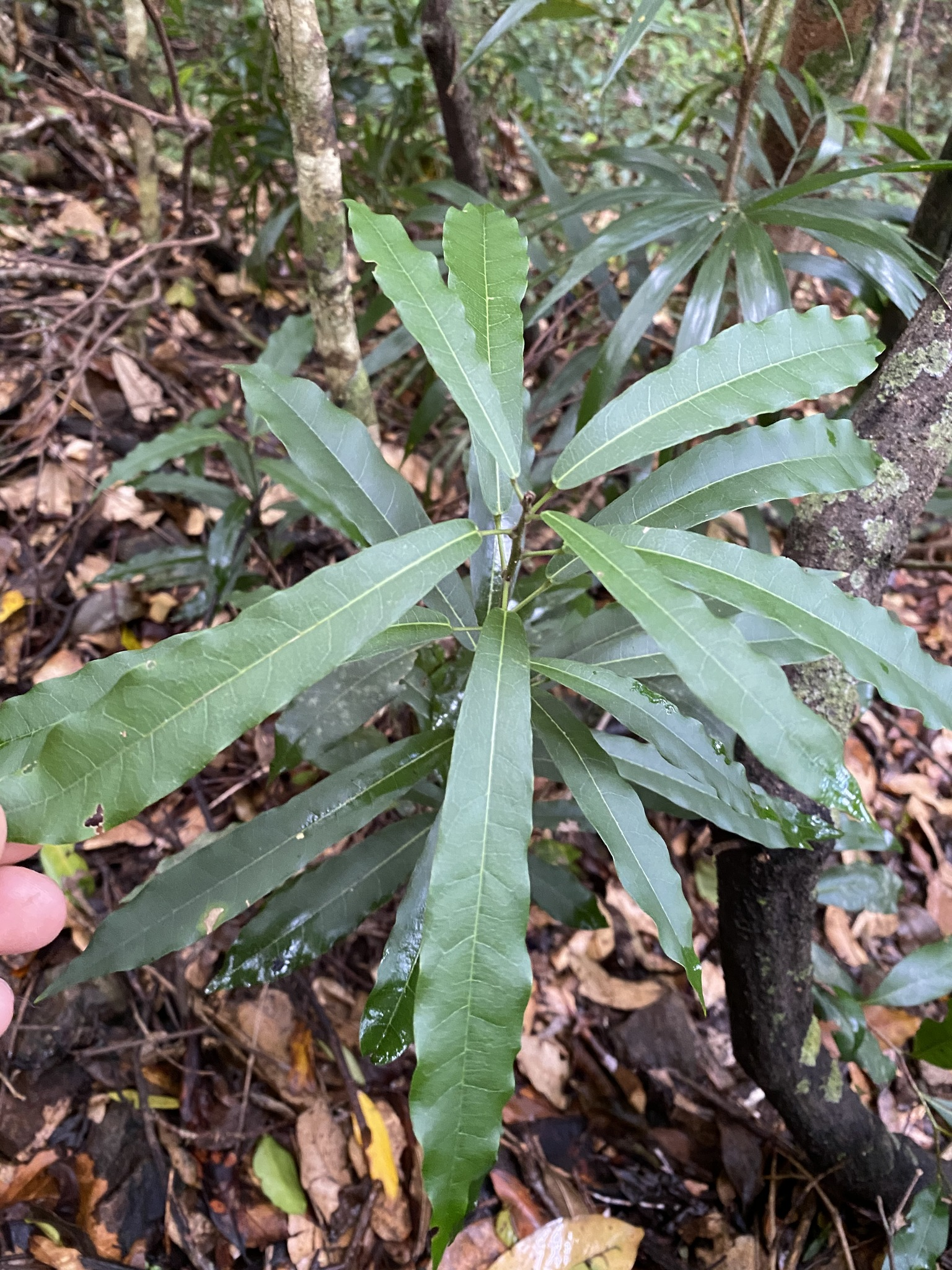
- Carronia multisepalea

Scientific classification
- Kingdom: Plantae
- Clade: Tracheophytes
- Clade: Angiosperms
- Clade: Eudicots
- Order: Ranunculales
- Family: Menispermaceae
- Genus: Carronia; F.Muell.

= Carronia =

Genus of flowering plants

Carronia is a genus of flowering plants belonging to the family Menispermaceae. Its native range is New Guinea, northern and eastern Australia.

== Species ==
The following species are recognised in the genus Carronia:

- Carronia multisepalea F.Muell.
- Carronia pedicellata Forman
- Carronia protensa (F.Muell.) Diels
- Carronia thyrsiflora (Becc.) Diels
