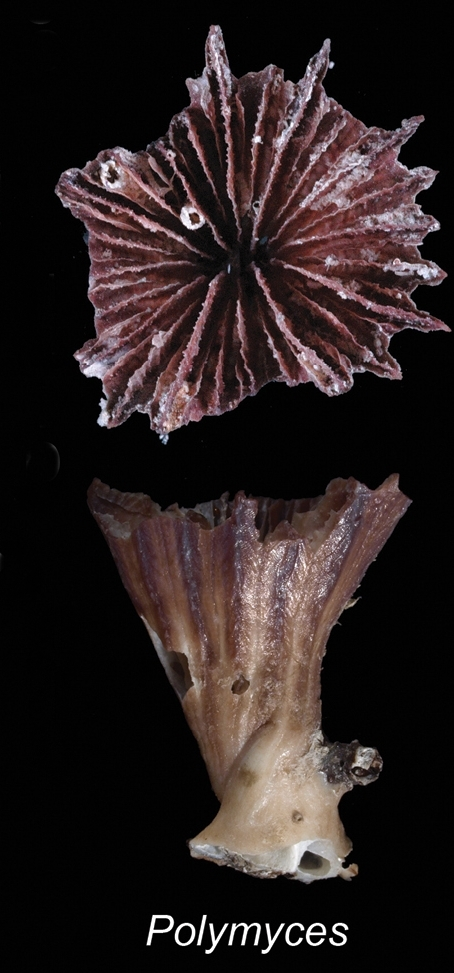
- Polymyces wellsi

Scientific classification
- Domain: Eukaryota
- Kingdom: Animalia
- Phylum: Cnidaria
- Subphylum: Anthozoa
- Class: Hexacorallia
- Order: Scleractinia
- Family: Flabellidae
- Genus: Polymyces; Cairns, 1979

= Polymyces =

Genus of corals

Polymyces is a genus of corals belonging to the family Flabellidae.

The species of this genus are found in Pacific Ocean and western Atlantic Ocean.

Species:

- Polymyces fragilis (Pourtalès, 1868)
- Polymyces montereyensis (Durham, 1947)
- Polymyces wellsi Cairns, 1991
