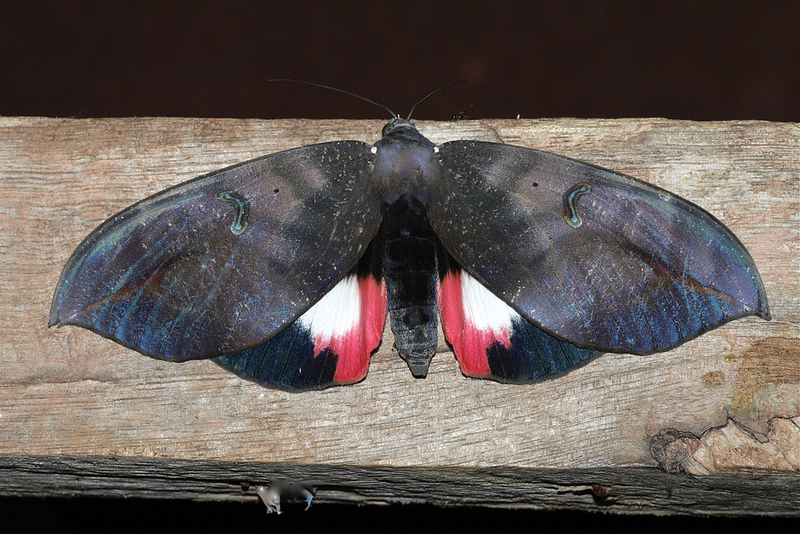
- Male from Borneo

Scientific classification
- Kingdom: Animalia
- Phylum: Arthropoda
- Clade: Pancrustacea
- Class: Insecta
- Order: Lepidoptera
- Superfamily: Noctuoidea
- Family: Erebidae
- Genus: Phyllodes
- Species: P. verhuelli

Binomial name
- Phyllodes verhuelli Vollenhoven, 1858

Synonyms
- Phyllodes cerasifera Butler, 1883; Phyllodes floralis Butler, 1883; Phyllodes enganensis Swinhoe, 1904

= Phyllodes verhuelli =

Species of moth

Phyllodes verhuelli is a noctuoid moth in the family Erebidae, subfamily Calpinae first described by Samuel Constantinus Snellen van Vollenhoven in 1858. The species can be found in lowland forests in Sundaland, southern Myanmar and the Philippines.
