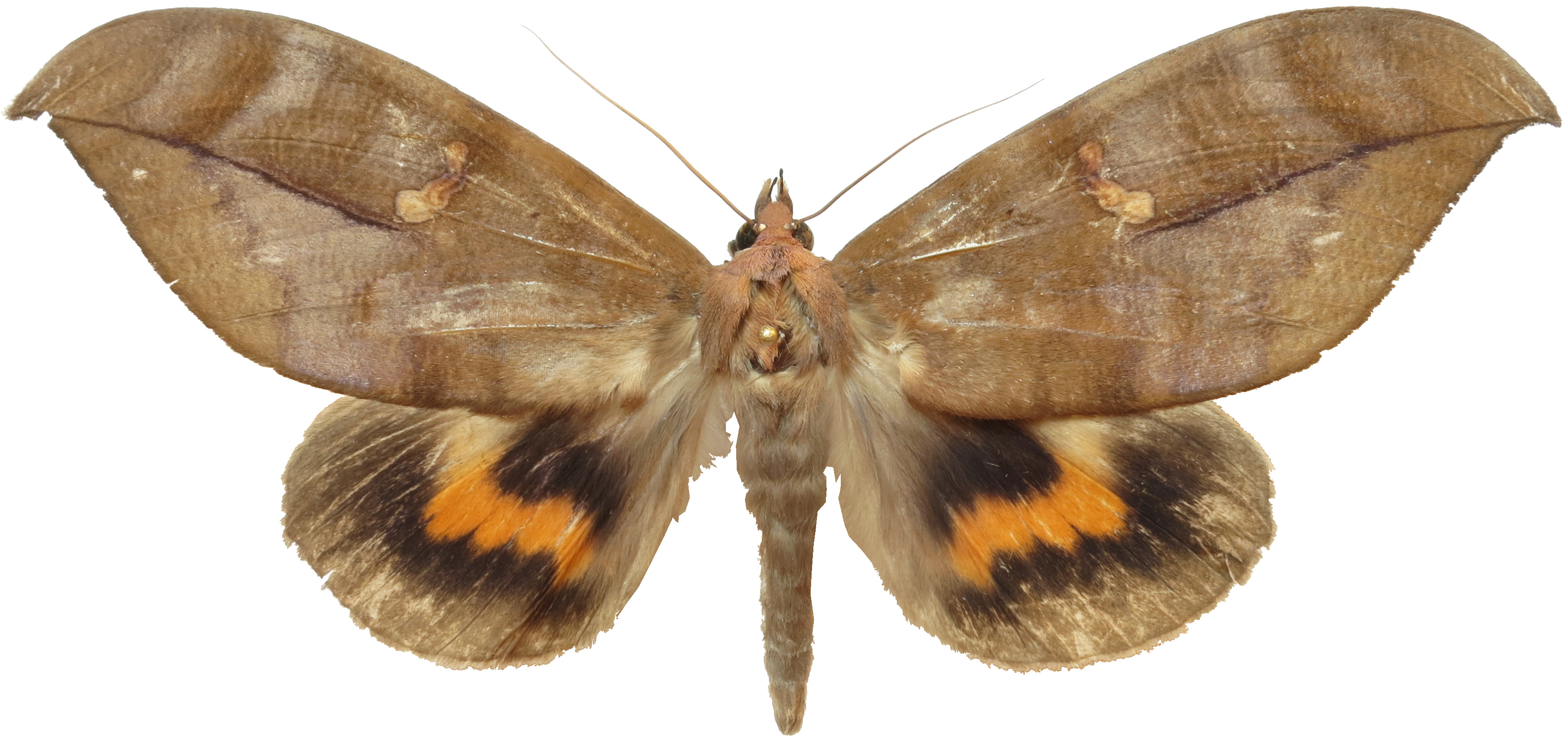
- Phyllodes eyndhovii

Scientific classification
- Kingdom: Animalia
- Phylum: Arthropoda
- Class: Insecta
- Order: Lepidoptera
- Superfamily: Noctuoidea
- Family: Erebidae
- Tribe: Phyllodini
- Genus: Phyllodes; Boisduval, 1832

Synonyms
- Xenodryas Gistl, 1848

= Phyllodes (moth) =

Genus of moths

Phyllodes is a genus of moths in the family Erebidae. The genus was erected by Jean Baptiste Boisduval in 1832

== Description ==
Tibia heavily spined. Antennae thickened and simple. Forewings narrower. Inner and outer margins quite evenly curved. Larva with four abdominal pairs.

== Species ==
- Phyllodes consobrina Westwood, 1848
- Phyllodes conspicillator Cramer, [1777]
- Phyllodes eyndhovii Vollenhoven, 1858
- Phyllodes imperialis Druce, 1888
- Phyllodes staudingeri Semper, 1901
- Phyllodes verhuelli Vollenhoven, 1858
