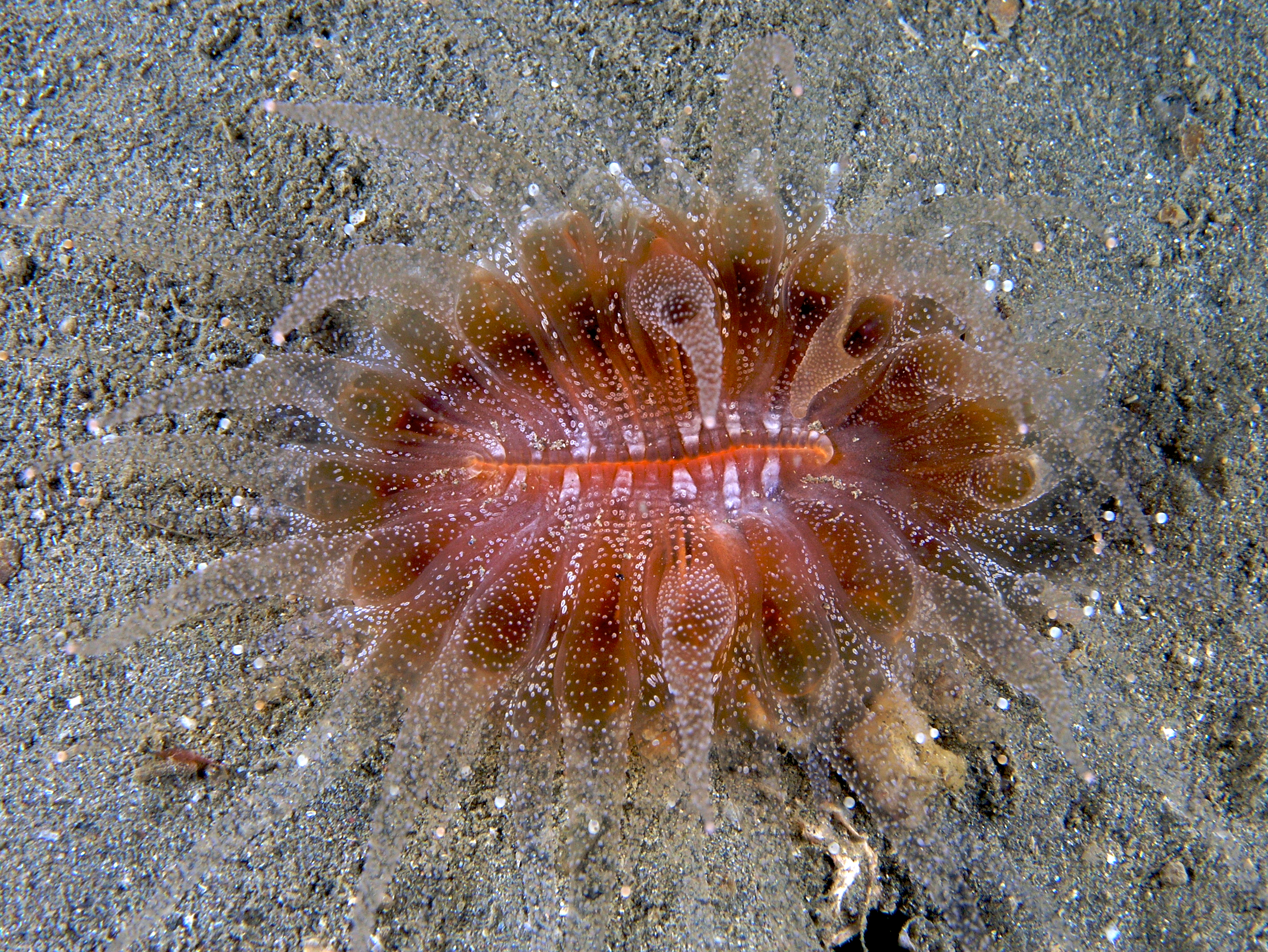

Scientific classification
- Domain: Eukaryota
- Kingdom: Animalia
- Phylum: Cnidaria
- Subphylum: Anthozoa
- Class: Hexacorallia
- Order: Scleractinia
- Family: Flabellidae
- Genus: Flabellum; Lesson, 1831

Species
- See text

Synonyms
- Phyllodes

= Flabellum (coral) =

Flabellum Temporal range: Cretaceous—Present

Genus of corals

Flabellum is a genus of marine corals belonging to the family Flabellidae. These are a diverse group of azooxanthellate corals with about 190 species, 47 of which are extant. They are exclusively solitary corals and many are deep water species.

== Description ==
Corals in this genus are solitary, erect and flattened, with a short, thick peduncle and a long elliptical, slightly curved calyx. The costae are indistinct, simple and flat. The septa are in five complete cycles and are narrow, closely packed, slightly sinuous, and covered with projecting granules.

== Fossil record ==
Fossils of Flabellum are found in marine strata from the Cretaceous until the Quaternary (age range: from 66.043 to 0.012 million years ago.). Fossils are known from various localities in Europe, North America and Australia.

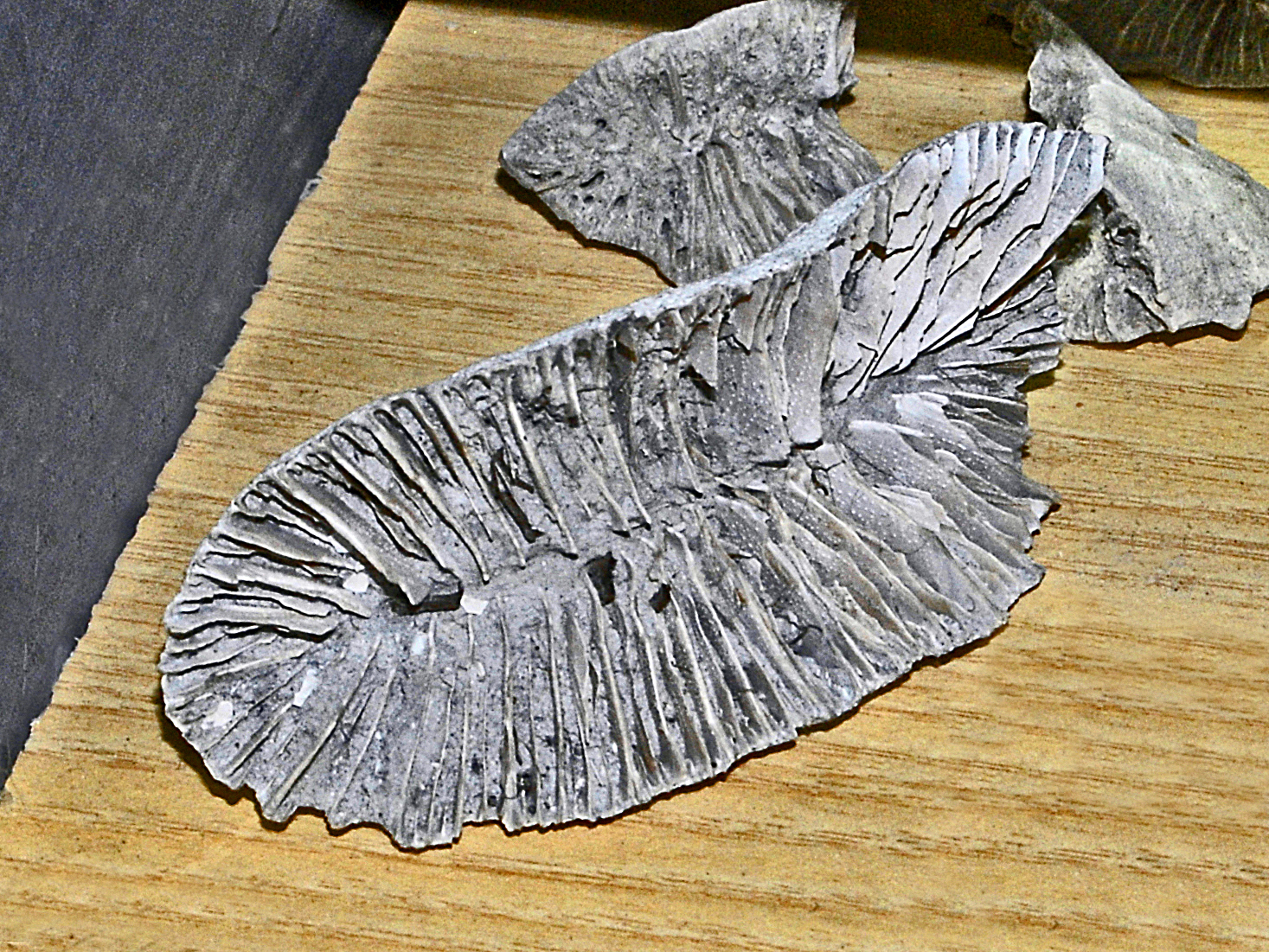
Fossil of Flabellum species

== Species ==
The following species are considered to belong to the genus Flabellum:

Subgenus Flabellum (Flabellum) Lesson, 1831

- Flabellum angustum Yabe & Eguchi, 1942
- Flabellum arcuatile Cairns, 1999
- Flabellum areum Cairns, 1982
- Flabellum atlanticum Cairns, 1979
- Flabellum australe Moseley, 1881
- Flabellum campanulatum Holdsworth, 1862
- Flabellum chunii Marenzeller, 1904
- Flabellum cinctutum Cairns & Polonio, 2013
- Flabellum curvatum Moseley, 1881
- Flabellum flexuosum Cairns, 1982
- Flabellum floridanum Cairns, 1991
- Flabellum folkesoni Cairns, 1998
- Flabellum gardineri Cairns, 1982
- Flabellum impensum Squires, 1962
- Flabellum knoxi Ralph & Squires, 1962
- Flabellum lamellulosum Alcock, 1902
- Flabellum magnificum Marenzeller, 1904
- Flabellum ongulense Eguchi, 1965
- Flabellum patens Moseley, 1881
- Flabellum pavoninum Lesson, 1831
- Flabellum politum Cairns, 1989
- Flabellum thouarsii Milne Edwards & Haime, 1848
- Flabellum transversale Moseley, 1881
- Flabellum vaughani Cairns, 1984

Subgenus Flabellum (Ulocyathus) M. Sars, 1851

- Flabellum alabastrum Moseley in Thomson, 1873
- Flabellum angulare Moseley, 1876
- Flabellum aotearoa Squires, 1964
- Flabellum apertum Moseley, 1876
- Flabellum conuis Moseley, 1881
- Flabellum daphnense Durham & Barnard, 1952
- Flabellum deludens Marenzeller, 1904
- Flabellum hoffmeisteri Cairns & Parker, 1992
- Flabellum japonicum Moseley, 1881
- Flabellum lowekeyesi Squires & Ralph, 1965
- Flabellum macandrewi Gray, 1849
- Flabellum marcus Keller, 1974
- Flabellum marenzelleri Cairns, 1989
- Flabellum messum Alcock, 1902
- Flabellum moseleyi Pourtalès, 1880
- Flabellum sexcostatum Cairns, 1989
- Flabellum tuthilli Hoffmeister, 1933
