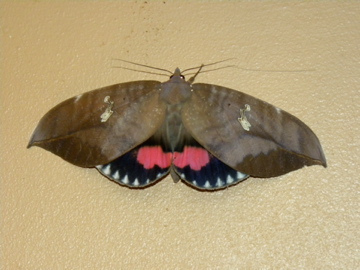

Scientific classification
- Domain: Eukaryota
- Kingdom: Animalia
- Phylum: Arthropoda
- Class: Insecta
- Order: Lepidoptera
- Superfamily: Noctuoidea
- Family: Erebidae
- Genus: Phyllodes
- Species: P. imperialis

Binomial name
- Phyllodes imperialis H. Druce, 1888

Synonyms
- Xenodryas meyricci; Phyllodes meyricki Olliff, 1889; Phyllodes meyricci Hampson, 1913; Phyllodes papuana Hampson, 1913; Phyllodes dealbata Holloway, 1979

= Phyllodes imperialis =

Species of moth

Phyllodes imperialis, the imperial fruit-sucking moth or pink underwing moth, is a noctuoid moth in the family Erebidae, subfamily Calpinae. It was first described by Herbert Druce in 1888. The species can be found in north-eastern Queensland to northern New South Wales, Papua New Guinea, Solomons, Vanuatu and New Caledonia.

== Description ==
The wingspan is 130–170 millimetres (5.1–6.7 in). The "leaf-shaped" forewings are grey-brown and show a distinctive white or yellow marking which varies somewhat among populations. The ventral side of the forewing has a discal, dark-brown patch containing three white spots. The hindwings are dark brown to black with a large central pink patch extending to the inner margin, to which the common name "pink underwing moth" refers.

Early instars of the caterpillar are dull brown, but green individuals are also observed. Mature caterpillars are dark brown to reddish brown and show large eyespots. These are composed of a black pupil surrounded by a blue, then yellow ring. Between and below the eyespots are white markings, often described as looking like teeth, and resemble the teeth from a cartoon skeleton.

== Subspecies ==
The following subspecies are known:

- Phyllodes imperialis imperialis from the Solomon Islands
- Phyllodes imperialis dealbata from New Caledonia and Vanuatu
- Phyllodes imperialis meyricki from the north of Australia and Papua New Guinea
- Phyllodes imperialis smithersi from the southeast of Queensland and the northeast of New South Wales

== Food plants ==
The larvae feed on Menispermaceae species, including Carronia multisepala and Pycnarrhena australiana.

== Gallery ==
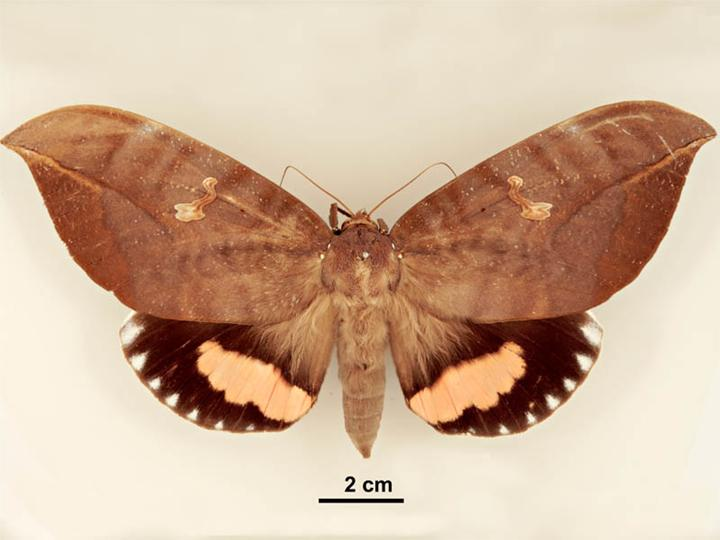
Female, dorsal view

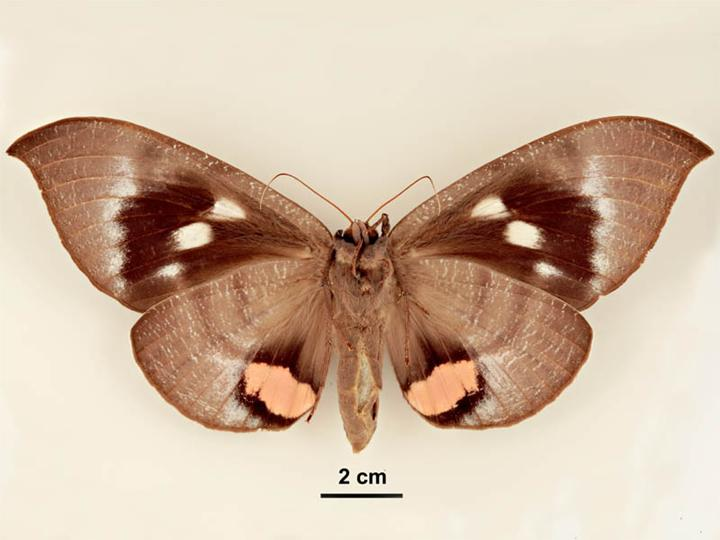
Female, ventral view

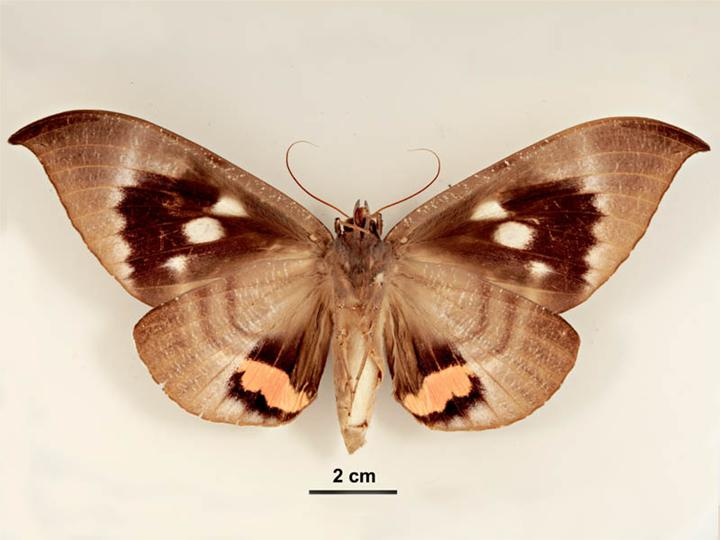
Male, ventral view

== Literature ==
- Druce, H. (1888). "Descriptions of new species of Lepidoptera". Annals and Magazine of Natural History. (6): 234–242.
