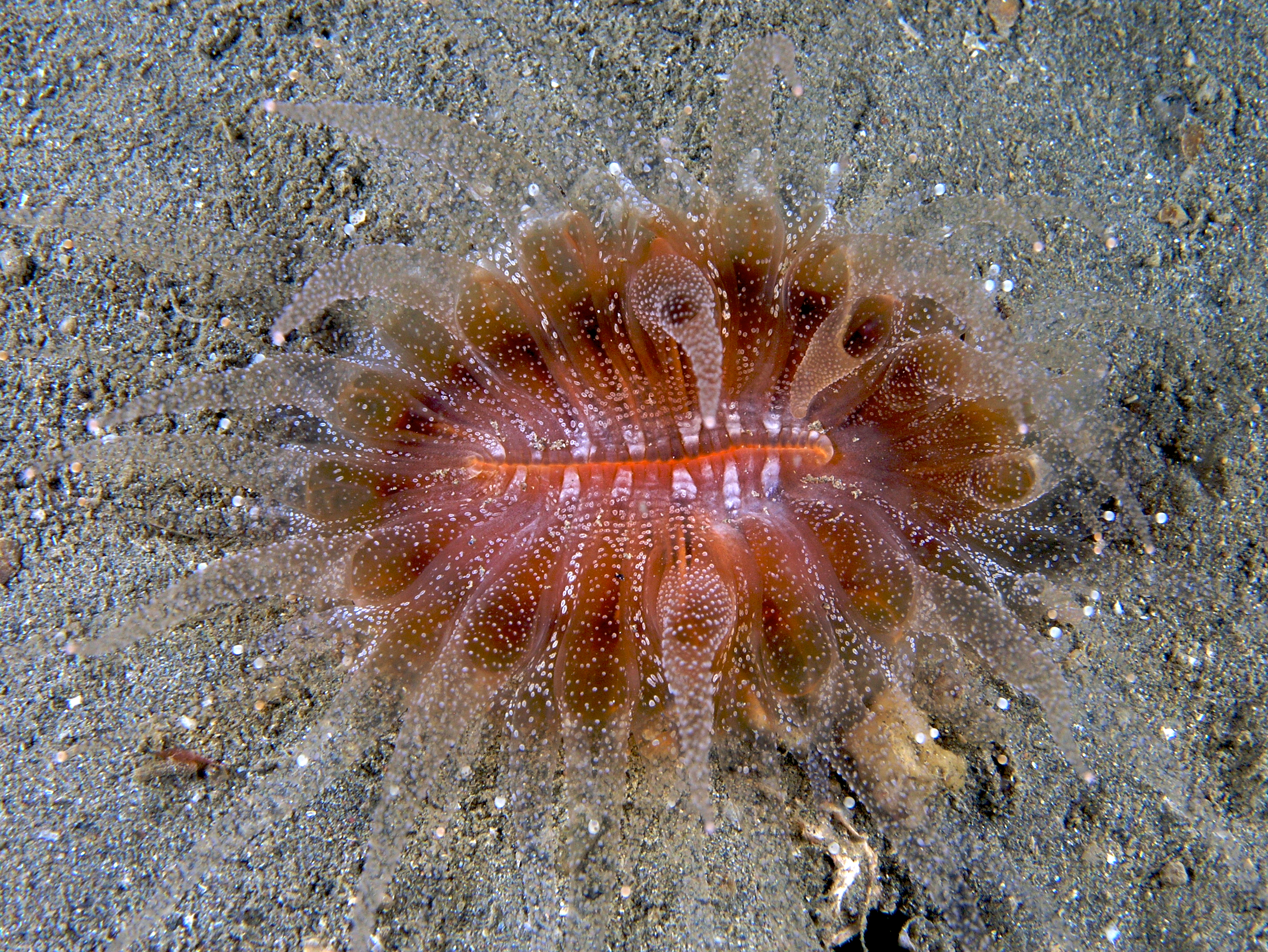
- Flabellum sp. with extended polyps at night

Scientific classification
- Kingdom: Animalia
- Phylum: Cnidaria
- Subphylum: Anthozoa
- Class: Hexacorallia
- Order: Scleractinia
- Family: Flabellidae; Bourne, 1905

Genera
- See text

= Flabellidae =

Family of corals

Flabellidae is a family of marine corals. It consists of the following genera:

- Blastotrochus Milne Edwards & Haime, 1848
- †Conosmilia Duncan 1865
- Falcatoflabellum Cairns, 1995
- Flabellum Lesson, 1831
- Javania Duncan, 1876
- Monomyces Ehrenberg, 1834
- Placotrochides Alcock, 1902
- Placotrochus Milne Edwards & Haime, 1848
- Polymyces Cairns, 1979
- Rhizotrochus Milne Edwards & Haime, 1848
- †Tortoflabellum Squires, 1958
- Truncatoflabellum Cairns, 1989
